= Blagrave =

Blagrave is a surname, and may refer to:

- Daniel Blagrave (1603–1668), English politician
- Herbert Blagrave (1899–1981), English cricketer
- John Blagrave (c. 1561 – 1611), English mathematician
- John Blagrave (major) (1630–1704), English politician
- Joseph Blagrave (1610–1682), English astrologer
- Mark Blagrave (born 1956), Canadian writer
- Thomas Blagrave (died 1590), English official
