= Aldworth (disambiguation) =

Aldworth is a village in Berkshire, England.

Aldworth may also refer to:

- Aldworth Manor, summer estate house in Harrisville, New Hampshire
- Aldworth (Blackdown), a house in Blackdown in the English county of Sussex built by Alfred Tennyson

== People with the surname ==
- Hannah Aldworth (died 1778), English philanthropist
- Richard Aldworth (disambiguation) (several people)
- Robert Aldworth (died 1634), English merchant and philanthropist
- Robert Aldworth (MP) (c. 1624–1676), member of Parliament for Bristol and Devizes, England
- Thomas Aldworth (fl. 1520–1577), mayor and member of parliament for Reading, England

== See also ==
- Alworth (disambiguation)
