= Watlington =

Watlington may refer to:

== Places ==
- Watlington, Norfolk, England
- Watlington, Oxfordshire, England
- Whatlington, Sussex, England
- Watlington, New Zealand

== People with the surname ==
- John Perry-Watlington (1823–1882), British politician
- Neal Watlington (1922–2019), American baseball player
- Samuel Watlington (fl. 1688–1711), British cloth merchant
