= Allworth =

Allworth may refer to:

- Allworth, New South Wales, small village in Australia
- Allworth Press, publisher acquired by Skyhorse Publishing

== People with the surname ==
- Edward Allworth (1895–1966), American army officer
- Edward A. Allworth (1920–2016), American historian
- Robert Allworth (1943–2017), Australian composer

== See also ==
- Alworth (disambiguation)
- Aldworth (disambiguation)
