= John Bourne =

John Bourne may refer to:

- John Cooke Bourne (1814–1896), English artist and engraver
- John Bourne (artist) (born 1943), British artist and painter
- John Bourne (cricketer) (1872–1952), English cricketer
- Sir John Bourne (died 1575), MP for Guildford, Midhurst, Worcester, Worcestershire and Preston
- John Bourne (died 1558), MP for Reading

== See also ==
- Jonathan Bourne Jr. (merchant) (1811–1889), American whaling agent and merchant
- Jonathan Bourne Jr. (politician) (1855–1940), U.S. senator
- Sir John Bourn (1934–2022), British former civil servant
