= Sir Thomas Rich, 1st Baronet =

Member of the Parliament of England

Sir Thomas Rich MP Bt
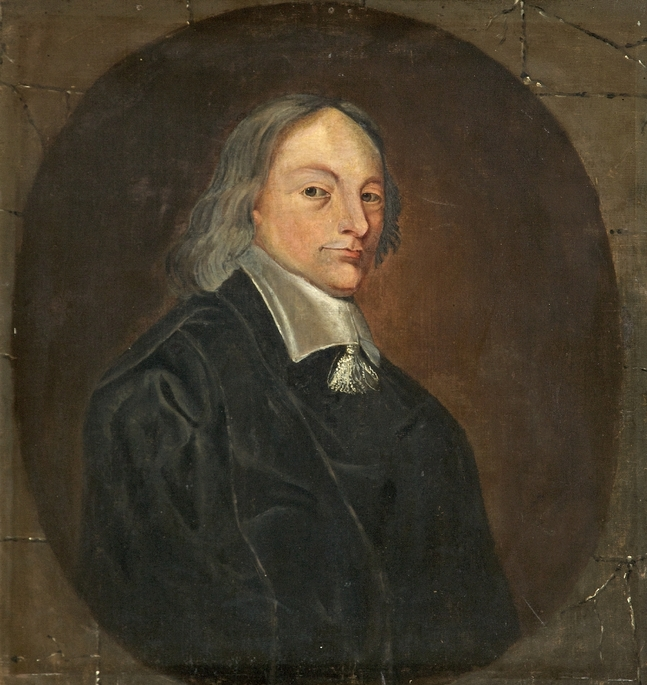

Member of Parliament for Reading
- In office 1660–1660
- Preceded by: Daniel Blagrave
- Succeeded by: Sir Thomas Dolman; Richard Aldworth

High Sheriff of Berkshire
- In office 1657–1658
- Preceded by: William Bigg
- Succeeded by: Oliver Pleydell

Personal details
- Born: 1601 Gloucester, Gloucestershire, England
- Died: 15 October 1667 (aged 65–66)
- Resting place: Sonning, Berkshire, England
- Children: Sir William Rich, 2nd Baronet, 2 others
- Relatives: Richard Rich (Sheriff of London) (great-grandfather); Richard Rich, 1st Baron Rich (2nd cousin)
- Education: Wadham College, Oxford
- Occupation: merchant, politician

Sir Thomas Rich, 1st Baronet (c. 1601 – 15 October 1667) was an English merchant and politician who sat in the House of Commons in 1660. He established Sir Thomas Rich's School, a grammar school.

Rich was born in Gloucester, son of Thomas Rich, an alderman of the city, and Anne, daughter of Thomas Machin, in 1601. He was sent to school in London and went on to study at the newly founded Wadham College, Oxford. Afterwards, he worked in the city of London in the wine importing trade. Rich later purchased the manor of Sonning, near Reading.

Rich died in 1667 and was buried in the Rich Chapel in the parish church at Sonning – his monument has been moved to under the church tower.

== Career ==
In 1657 Rich was appointed High Sheriff of Berkshire and in 1660 elected Member of Parliament (MP) for Reading in the Convention Parliament. In 1661, Charles II created him Baronet of Sunning, Berkshire.

== Personal life ==
He married firstly Barbara Morewood, daughter of Gilbert Morewood and Martha Saunderson, by whom he had one daughter Mary, who married Sir Robert Gayer. He married, secondly, Elizabeth Cockayne (or Cokayne), by whom he had several children, including William, his son and heir.

== Legacy ==
In his will, Rich left £6000 and his house in Gloucester to establish a school for poor boys. The money was invested in local farmland, and the rent generated by the house was used to pay for the upkeep and operation of the school. Sir Thomas Rich's School opened in 1668, one year after Rich's death, and is currently a grammar school for boys, and operates a 6th form for both genders. The school celebrates the founding with Founders' Fortnight.

Parliament of England
Preceded by Daniel Blagrave	Member of Parliament for Reading; 1660; With: John Blagrave	Succeeded by Sir Thomas Dolman; Richard Aldworth
Baronetage of England
New creation	Baronet (of Sunning, Berkshire); 1661–1667	Succeeded by William Rich
