= Richard Justice =

Richard Justice may refer to:

- Richard Justice (MP) (died 1548/9), MP for Reading
- Richard Justice (composer) (died 1757), English harpsichordist and composer
- Richard Justice (sports journalist), American sports journalist

== See also ==
- Dick Justice (1906–1962), American folk singer
