= Nicholas Hyde (disambiguation) =

Nicholas Hyde (died 1631) was Lord Chief Justice of England and MP for several constituencies.

Nicholas Hyde may also refer to:

- Sir Nicholas Hyde, 1st Baronet (1561–1625)
- Nicholas Hyde (died 1528), MP for Reading
- Nick Hyde, New Zealand footballer
