= Reading Blue Coat School =

Coordinates: 51°28′12″N 0°55′1″W

Reading Blue Coat School, Sonning-on-Thames
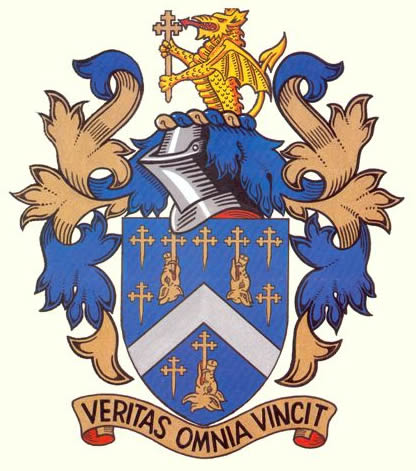
- Reading, Berkshire, RG4 6SU; England

Information
- Type: Private day school
- Motto: Latin: Veritas Omnia Vincit ('Truth Conquers All)
- Religious affiliation: Church of England
- Established: 1646; 380 years ago
- Founder: Richard Aldworth
- Ex-officio, Chairman of Trustees of The Blue Coat Foundation: B Shenton
- Headmaster: P Thomas
- Gender: Co-educational
- Age: 11 to 18
- Enrolment: 775 (approx.)
- Houses: Aldworth, Hall, Malthus, Norwood, Rich, West
- Colours: Blue and Yellow
- Publication: The Aldworthian (Annual), OldBlues News (Annual)
- Former pupils: Old Blues
- Affiliations: HMC
- Website: https://www.rbcs.org.uk/

Reading Blue Coat School is a co-educational private day school in Holme Park, Sonning, Berkshire. It is situated beside the River Thames, and was established in 1646 by Richard Aldworth, who named it "Aldworth's Hospital". Aldworth founded a near-identical school in Basingstoke in the same year.

== History ==
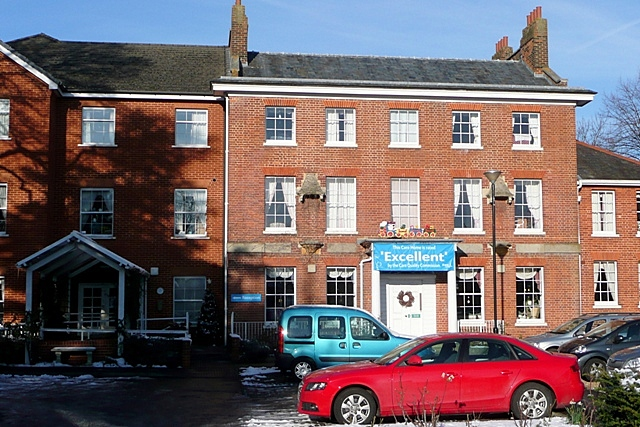
Brunswick House, the home of the Reading Blue Coat School from 1852 to 1947, now expanded and used as a nursing home

The school was established in 1646 at the height of the English Civil War, when a wealthy London merchant, Richard Aldworth of Stanlake Park, left the Corporation of Reading the sum of £4,000, the proceeds of which were to be devoted to "the education and upbringing of twenty poor male children, being the children of honest, religious poor men in the town of Reading." From this bequest, which in 17th century terms was quite substantial, originated the Aldworth's Hospital charity school now better known as the Reading Blue Coat School.

Aldworth, who had been a governor of Christ's Hospital in London, modelled the new foundation on his former school, the boys being required to wear the Bluecoat attire of gown, yellow stockings, and buckled shoes. Aldworth's will further stipulated that the Master of the new school should be "an honest, Godly and learned man" who for his "paines" would receive a stipend of £30 a year. His duties were to include the instruction of reading, writing and ciphering and to "teach the Catechism in the points of Christian Religion."

== The Talbot ==
The School was originally accommodated in an old building situated at the corner of Silver Street and London Street known as 'The Talbot' in one of the oldest parts of Reading. The house, once an old inn, was in a dilapidated condition. Owing to litigation in connection with Aldworth's will, it was not until 1660, the year of Charles II's restoration, that the first boys entered the School to be taught. Despite many difficulties at the outset, the School flourished and even received generous subventions from local benefactors such as William Malthus and John West. Malthus also left a certain sum for an annual sermon to be preached to the boys, a tradition still maintained in Reading at the end of each summer term.

In 1666, Sir Thomas Rich of Holme Park, Sonning, gave the Corporation the sum of £1,000 to "maintain six poor boys in Aldworth's Hospital, three of whom to be chosen from the parish of Sonning". In 1947, the new School moved to its current home on Rich's estate. The existing Holme Park mansion is situated within a few hundred yards of Rich's own manor house, an old residence which in turn had been built near an ancient ruined palace that had belonged to the Bishops of Salisbury long before the Norman Conquest in 1066.

The 'Talbot' was not at all suited to the needs of a growing school, and soon the Corporation, as Trustees, decided to replace it with a more modern structure in 1723. That the School's reputation and circumstances stood at a low ebb is further confirmed by an order of the Trustees that "the Master of the Blue Coat School do not suffer the boys to play about the streets but that they be kept within the limits of the said School between and after School times, and that the Master go with the said children to the Parish Church of St Laurence every Sunday". This they unfailingly did, every Sunday until 1946. In these premises the School was to remain until 1852 when it removed to the more commodious Brunswick House on the Bath Road in Reading. For nearly 90 years, generations of Blue Coat boys were to be educated there in 'the three Rs', many proceeding to a variety of local apprenticeships, trades and professions.

== Changing times ==
The impact of the Second World War, combined with rising educational expectations, posed challenges to the School which was faced with the fate of eventual closure unless it removed to more extensive premises outside Reading and met the terms of the Education Act 1944. Described by the Headmaster, Bernard Inge, as "an act of faith", and following a local fundraising appeal sponsored by the Bishop of Reading, the Mayor, and Corporation, the Trustees acquired the Holme Park estate. 150 boys, of whom a hundred were boarders, with nine teachers eventually made the move to Sonning on 21 January 1947, the headmaster's 44th birthday.

Buildings and facilities had to be updated in haste if the Ministry of Education's stringent regulations were to be met and its 'recognition of efficiency' accorded. New classrooms were opened in 1955 and named after the Dunster brothers. In 1961, the School's first Sixth Form was opened. A major new science centre was opened in 1973, closely followed by a brand new Sixth Form Centre and enlarged library. Further classrooms including modern facilities for technology and computing were added in the 1980s in response to rising educational expectations and growing pupil numbers.

In 2001, the new Allan Sanders Science Centre was completed and a brand new Sports Hall opened in 2004. In 2006, the School celebrated its 360th anniversary. In 2008, the school opened their brand new cricket pavilion which overlooked the cricket field adjacent to the car park. 2009 was a year of change in the school, the new Boat House was opened on the banks of the river below the school and the sixth form centre was expanded and altered with the knocking through of many interior walls. The connecting (and little used) squash court was incorporated into the centre. The newly completed 'James McArthur Sixth Form Center' (named after a previous headmaster) was opened in the autumn of 2010 by Old Blue and MP for Reading West Alok Sharma.

April 2011 saw the demolition of the Dunster, Gaines Cooper and Lesser buildings and the start of construction of a new classroom block, the Richard Aldworth Building, which now provides teaching facilities for English, Maths, Modern Languages, Classics and Geography. It also houses the Art department, with views over the School's pitches and the River Thames. The RAB also contains a Common Room for Middle School pupils (aged 13–16). The building has a number of environmental features, such as a ground-source heat pump and the recycling of rainwater. The new building was opened in time for the start of the 2012/13 academic year. It was opened officially on 28 September 2012 by the Home Secretary Theresa May.

On Remembrance Day 2014, 100 years after the outbreak of the First World War, a 13-year-old pupil, Harry Hayes, who is a member of the School's Combined Cadet Force (CCF), planted the last poppy of the Blood Swept Lands and Seas of Red, a 2014 work of installation art placed in the moat of the Tower of London, England on 11 November 2014, specifically commemorating the centenary of the outbreak of World War I (28 July 1914).

Jack Imeson, a former member of staff who left the School in 2006, was convicted of the sexual abuse of two former Blue Coat pupils in the early 1980s.

Harvey McGough a former head of design and Technology who left the school in 2021 pleaded guilty of making indecent photographs of children and possession of prohibited images at Reading Crown Court (though there was no evidence of anyone being affected or involved from the school). He was employed at the school from 2008 until his resignation in March 2021.

Fiona Carrier, a former private piano teacher, pleaded guilty at Oxford Magistrates Court to indecent Assault at her own house in the 1990s. She and a then-pupil of the school who was below the age of consent had touched each other’s private parts on a sofa at her home.

== Extracurricular activities ==
=== Sport ===
- The school opened a new sports centre which is also available for members of the surrounding village of Sonning to use. The Sports Hall includes a gym, changing rooms and a multi-purpose hall. The School has a very successful rowing club called the Reading Blue Coat School Boat Club.

=== Music ===
- The school has its own resident orchestra, the Aldworth Philharmonic Orchestra (APO). APO was formed in 2002 by an Old Blue, Andrew Taylor.

=== Other activities ===
- The school was a founding member of the World Individual Debating and Public Speaking Championships, and hosted the tournament from 1988 to 1995. The tournament returned to the School in 2009.
- Combined Cadet Force, with an Army, Navy and RAF section.
- Duke of Edinburgh award, members of the Sixth Form are able to undertake the Gold Award.

== Notable former pupils ==
- Lily-Mae Fisher, Royal Navy commando
- Jeremy Kyle, broadcaster
- Alok Sharma – Member of Parliament for Reading West and COP 26 Climate Summit President
