= Bedull =

Bedull may refer to:

- Bedollo or Bedull
- Richard Bedull, MP
