= John Blagrave (major) =

English politician

John Blagrave (1630 – March 1704) was an English politician who sat in the House of Commons at various times between 1660 and 1685.

Blagrave was the son of Anthony Blagrave of Bulmershe Court at Earley in Berkshire and his wife Dorothy, daughter of Thomas Dolman of Shaw House in the same county. The Blagraves were a branch of that family of Calcot Park, Berkshire. He was baptised in the parish church at Sonning on 12 August 1630. He was educated at St John's College, Oxford being awarded BA in 1651 and MA in 1653. He was a Fellow of St John's and was later at Middle Temple in 1655.

In 1660, Blagrave was returned unopposed as Member of Parliament for Reading in the Convention Parliament, but did not stand in 1661. He was re-elected MP for Reading in 1679 and sat until 1685. He was a major in the Royal Berkshire Militia and was arrested at the time of Monmouth's invasion in 1685.

Blagrave married Hester, daughter of merchant William Gore, of Barrow Gurney in Somerset and Morden in Surrey. They had seven children, including Anthony Blagrave who was also MP for Reading. Blagrave died at the age of 73 and was buried in the family vault in Sonning Church on 9 March 1704.

Parliament of England
Preceded by Daniel Blagrave; Henry Neville	Member of Parliament for Reading; 1660 – 1661; With: Thomas Rich	Succeeded by Sir Thomas Dolman; Richard Aldworth
Preceded by Sir Thomas Dolman; Richard Aldworth	Member of Parliament for Reading; 1679 – 1685; With: Nathan Knight	Succeeded by Thomas Coates; John Breedon
