= Richard Aldworth =

Richard Aldworth may refer to:

- Richard Aldworth (Parliamentarian), English politician, MP for Bristol 1646–1653
- Richard Aldworth (MP for Dublin University) (died 1707), MP for Dublin University (Irish House of Commons) 1695–1703
- Richard Aldworth (Reading MP) (c. 1614–1680), English politician, MP for Reading 1661–1679, and founder of the Blue Coat Schools in Reading and Basingstoke
- Richard Griffin, 2nd Baron Braybrooke (1750–1825), an English politician and MP for Reading, known as Richard Aldworth-Neville until he succeeded to the baronetcy in 1797
- Richard Neville Aldworth Neville (1717–1793), an English politician, MP for Reading, and diplomat

== See also ==
- Aldworth School in Basingstoke, formerly Richard Aldworth School
