= William Gifford (disambiguation) =

William Gifford (1756–1826) was an English writer.

William Gifford may also refer to:

- William Gifford (MP for Reading)
- William Gifford (Royal Navy officer) (c. 1649–1724), Royal Navy officer and Member of Parliament for Portsmouth
- Will Gifford (born 1985), English first-class cricketer
- Gabriel Gifford, name in religion of William Gifford (1554–1629), English Roman Catholic churchman, Benedictine and Archbishop of Reims

== See also ==
- William Giffard (died 1129), Lord Chancellor
