= Persia Beal House =

Historic house in New Hampshire, United States

- U.S. National Register of Historic Places
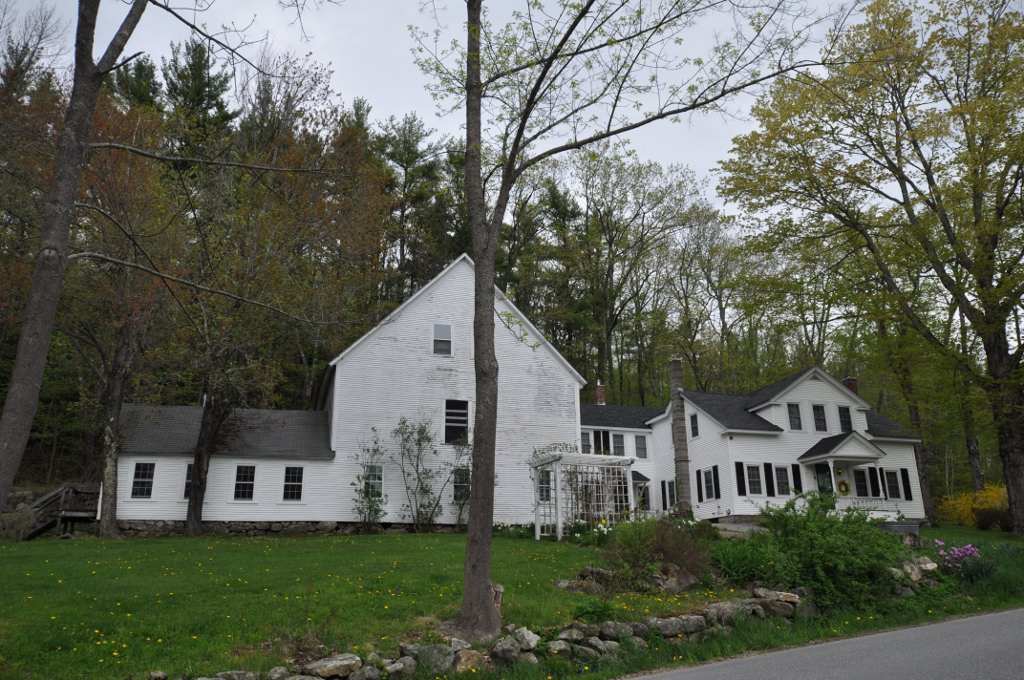

- Location within New Hampshire Location within the United States
- Location: 797 Chesham Rd., Harrisville, New Hampshire
- Coordinates: 42°56′40″N 72°6′20″W
- Area: 1.7 acres (0.69 ha)
- Built: 1842
- MPS: Harrisville MRA
- NRHP reference No.: 86003243
- Added to NRHP: January 14, 1988

The Persia Beal House is a historic house at 797 Chesham Road in Harrisville, New Hampshire. It is now the Harrisville Inn. Built about 1842, it is one of the best-preserved 19th century connected farmsteads in the town. The property is also notable for its association with Arthur E. Childs, who purchased the property to serve as the estate farm for his nearby Aldworth Manor summer estate. The house was listed on the National Register of Historic Places in 1988.

== Description and history ==
The Persia Beal House stands in a rural setting west of the center of Harrisville, on the north side of Chesham Road between Nelson and Aldworth Manor roads. It is a connected farmstead, with a 1½-story Cape on the right end, a two-story ell joining it to a three-story barn, and a single-story ell extending further to the left from the rear of the barn. The Cape section has a gabled wall dormer with three sash windows above a five-bay facade. The main entrance is at the center of that facade, sheltered by a gabled Victorian-era porch. There are secondary entrances in the ell and the barn, which have been adapted to serve hospitality functions. The barn is one of the largest 19th-century barns in the town.

The house was built about 1842 by Persia Beal, a farmer. In 1905 his farm was purchased by Arthur E. Childs, a businessman from Worcester, Massachusetts. Childs used the house as quarters for the caretaker of his summer estate, Aldworth Manor, which occupied the lands north and west of this property, and used its farmland as the estate farm. The property was sold by Childs in the 1930s.

== See also ==
- National Register of Historic Places listings in Cheshire County, New Hampshire
