= John Hunt (MP for Reading) =

Member of the Parliament of England

John Hunt (fl. 1383–1421) was a tailor and citizen of the town of Reading in the English county of Berkshire. He held the office of Mayor of Reading in 1404–5, 1407–8, 1418–19 and 1422–3. He was a Member (MP) of the Parliament of England for Reading in 1383, 1399, 1406 and 1421, although it is possible that it was his brother, a butcher also known as John Hunt, who had sat in the Parliaments of 1383 and 1399.
