= Richard Cleche =

Member of the Parliament of England

Richard Cleche (fl. 1476–1519) was a draper and leading citizen of the town of Reading in the English county of Berkshire. He held the office of Mayor of Reading in 1487–8, 1498-9 and 1505–6. He was a member (MP) of the parliament of England for Reading in 1510. The first reference to him, as Guardian of the High Ward, was in 1476, and he was last listed as a freeman in 1519.
