= Stanlake Park Wine Estate =

Vineyard in Berkshire, England

Coordinates: 51°28′15″N 0°50′54″W

Stanlake Park Wine Estate is the largest vineyard in the English county of Berkshire. It is situated near to Twyford, in the parishes of Hurst and Ruscombe.

== Vineyard and winery ==
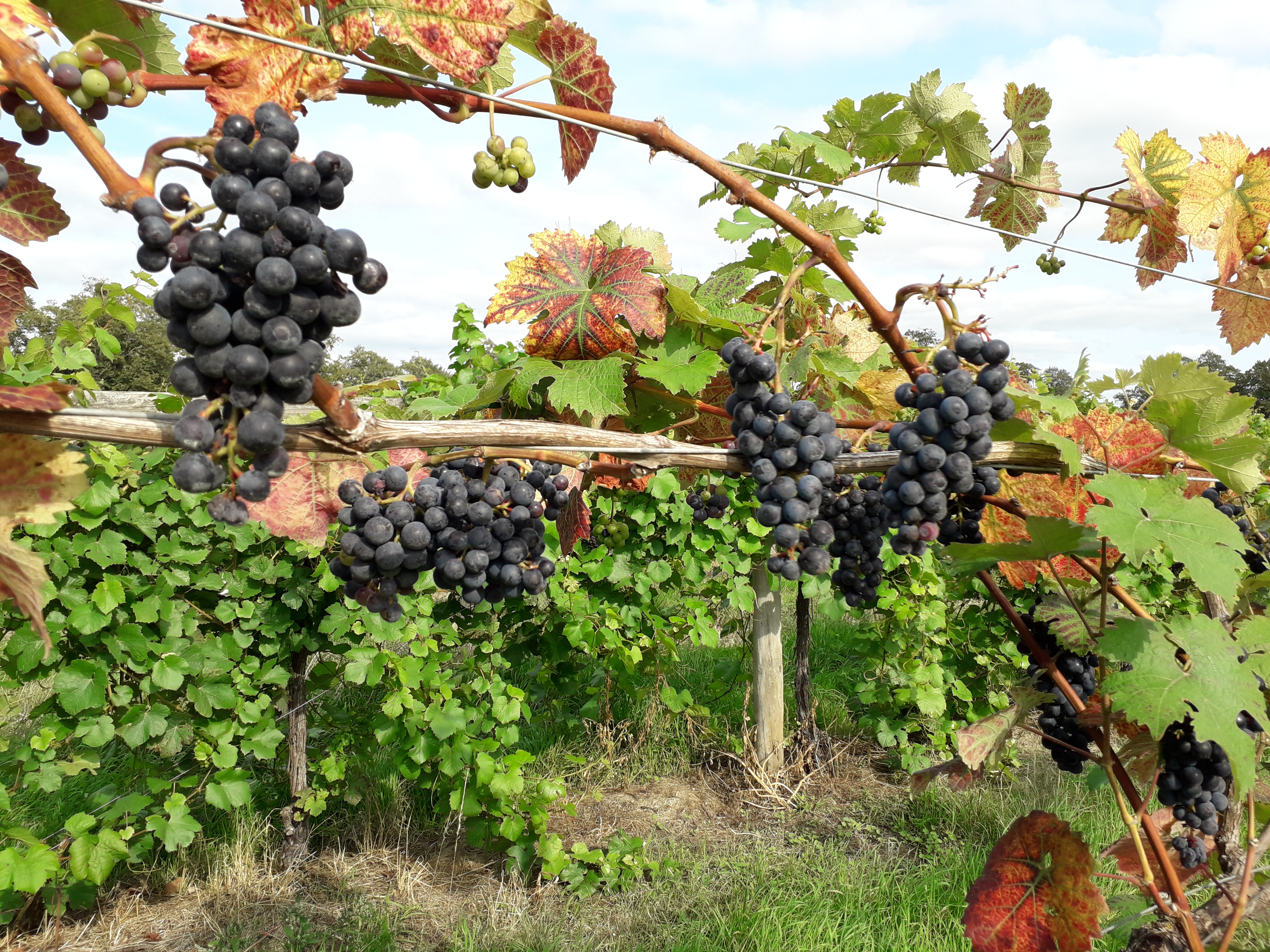

The estate dates back to 1166 and is located in Berkshire with four vineyards covering 10 acres (4.0 ha) of the 130-acre (53 ha) estate. It was originally known as Thames Valley Vineyards and was first planted in 1979 by Jon S. E. Leighton. The estate produces 14 different wines as well as a small number of wines from Italy courtesy of winemaker Nico Centonze from his family vineyard in Puglia, Italy. The winery also makes wine for other smaller vineyards in the locality.

== Manor house ==
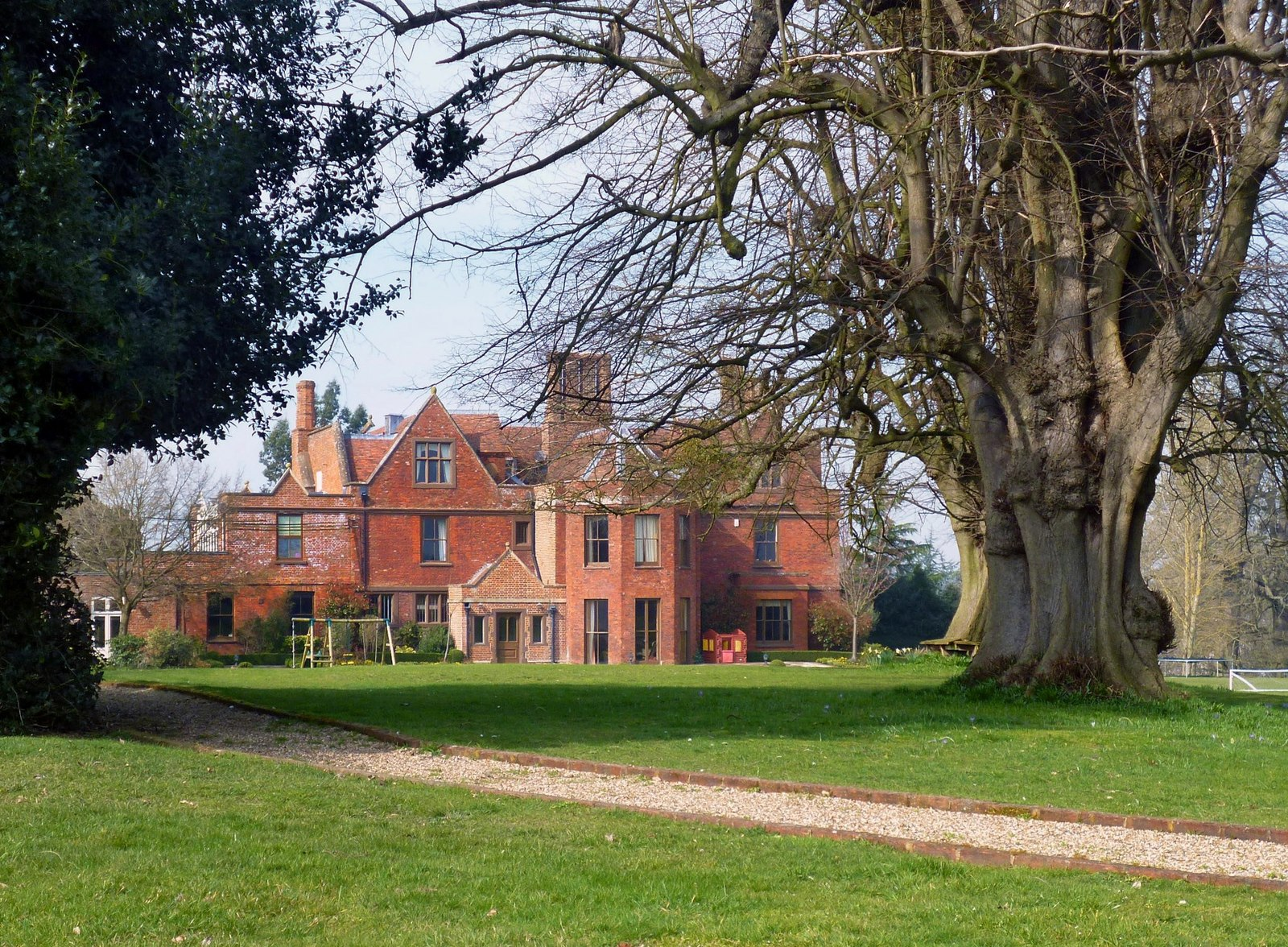
Stanlake Park manor house

Stanlake Park has a 17th-century country house at the centre of the estate. It was the manor house of Hinton Pipard and was built by the Aldworth family, who lived there before becoming Barons Braybrooke and moving to Billingbear House. They fought for Charles I during the English Civil War and, in 1646, Richard Aldworth founded Reading Blue Coat School. There is a stained glass window in the house showing the date of 1626 and was presented to the owner by Charles I.

== Visitors ==
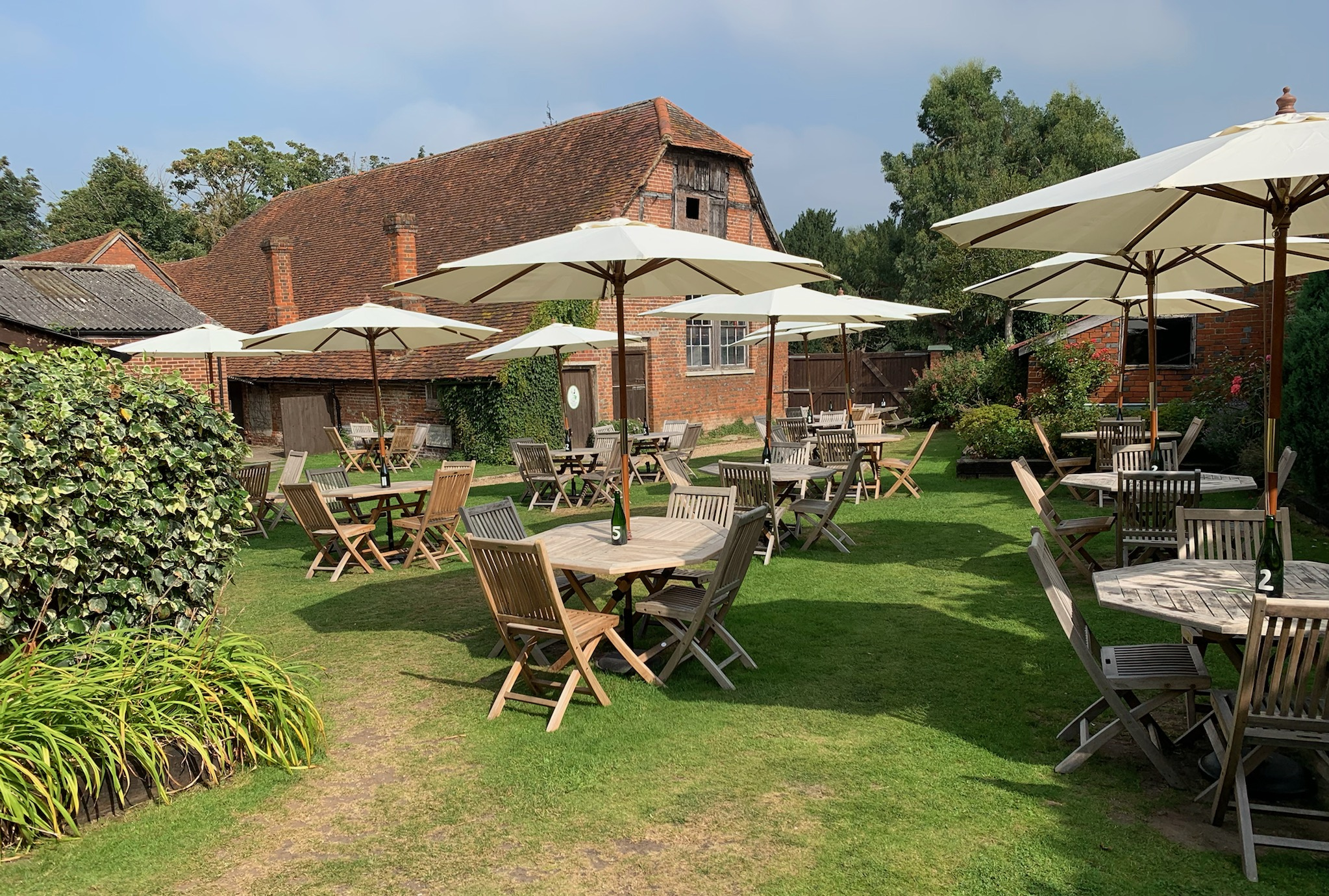

The Estate has a shop and bar and is open to the public 6 days per week as well as conducting wine tours and tastings. Weddings and private events are hosted at the estate, and accommodation is also available.
