= John Kent (died 1413) =

Member of the Parliament of England

John Kent (died 1413) was a politician from Reading in the English county of Berkshire.

John Kent was a mercer in the town of Reading and was elected Mayor there for the periods 1391–1392, 1393–1394, 1401–1402, 1405–1406 and 1409–1410. He was also elected a member (MP) of the parliament of England for Reading in October 1383, January 1390 and January 1404.

He is best remembered as a benefactor of St Laurence's Church where his memorial brass may still be seen.
