= World Individual Debating and Public Speaking Championships =

Annual debate and public speaking tournament

Tournament information
- Game: Debating and Public Speaking
- Established: 1988
- Number of events: 5 + 1 Overall Winner

Current champion
- (Canada) Flora Pan (Overall)

Individual Events
- Champion: (South Africa) Jemma Tresling; (Parliamentary Debate); (China) Madelyn Li; (Impromptu Speaking); (United States) Siddharth Chopra; (Interpretive Reading); (South Africa) Samuel Clarke; (Persuasive Speaking); (United States) Salar Sekhavat; (After-dinner Speaking)

The World Individual Debating and Public Speaking Championships (WIDPSC) is an annual English language debating and public speaking tournament for individual high school-level students representing different countries. It is the public speaking equivalent of the World Schools Debating Championships.

The most recent event was hosted in April 2026 in Bristol, United Kingdom and crowned Canada's Flora Pan as the overall world champion.

== History ==
The tournament was founded in 1988 by Reading Blue Coat School, St. John's-Ravenscourt School, the Debating Association of New England Independent Schools, Taunton School, Queen Anne's School, and The English School, Nicosia. It was one of the first international competitions to individually rank high school-level students in debating and public speaking. The tournament was founded the same year as the World Schools Debating Championships to respond to the desire for an equivalent competition for public speaking at the international level.

The first Worlds was hosted by Reading Blue Coat School in Reading, England and continued to be hosted in England until 1995. The late 1990s saw the tournament's hosts began to cycle through different countries, with Argentina hosting in 1998, Botswana hosting in 1999, and Cyprus hosting in 2000.

== Format ==
=== Organization ===
The tournament usually takes five to six days, with two to three rounds of events daily. The opening day of the tournament involves opening ceremonies and a guest speaker. The last two days do not involve any regular competition, except for those advancing to the final rounds. These days are occupied by a full day excursion or activity, and a formal closing banquet that involves the grand finals and awards ceremony. The grand finals of the tournament are considered to be a display of the tournament's best competitors. Some notable past locations of the grand finals have included the Utah State Capitol, Seimas of Lithuania and Kirstenbosch National Botanical Garden. Competitors also partake in other activities and outings organized by the host school during the week. These often involve exploring the city of the tournament.

Competitors must compete in four out of five events: parliamentary debate, impromptu speaking, interpretive reading, and either persuasive speaking or after-dinner speaking. Students compete in two preliminary rounds for each event. This is followed by a round of finals with approximately the top 10% of competitors competing. This is followed by a Grand Final show round, with the top two or three speakers in each character (the top 4 for debating).

=== Adjudication and Ranking ===
Adjudication for the tournament consists of members of the general public invited as judges, as well as one coach judge per room. Prior to the tournament, the host school will publicize the tournament and individuals locally associated with public speaking and debating and the host school will volunteer to judge. These individuals then participate in one or more training workshops. Scores are reviewed by a committee of coaches and experienced officials to discern for bias. The rationale behind this selection method stems from the founders' intent to assess ability on the basis of speaking to the 'common man or woman', not a specialized individual. Each competitor is judged by 40 to 50 judges by the end of the competition.

The top seven to twelve competitors in each event advance to final rounds, and the top two (or four for debate) competitors in the finals advance to the grand finals. Categorical rankings are decided on performance in the grand finals and finals. The final rounds are judged by coaches whose students are not in the category they are adjudicating. The overall ranking is based solely on the combined results of the preliminary rounds.

In 2023, it was decided that the overall champion of the World Individual Debating and Public Speaking Championships would receive the John Robinson Award – an award commemorating the founder of this international competition, John Robinson.

A notable difference between the WIDPSC and the World Schools Debating Championships – the parallel major international competition which specializes in debating rather than public speaking – is that WSDC's primary focus is on the ranking of each country's team as opposed to each individual participant's ranking. Accordingly, students at the WIDPSC often compete against fellow members of their country's team. WSDC is a different format of debate with three per side. WIDPSC debate format is two per side.

== Participants ==
Students from numerous countries have participated in the tournament, including: Australia, Hong Kong, Canada, the United States, England, South Africa, Lithuania, Pakistan, Cyprus, Argentina, Eswatini, Botswana, Israel, India, South Korea, Zimbabwe, Germany, Morocco and United Arab Emirates . Additionally, foreign nationals enrolled at schools abroad often compete, but are not officially recognized as representing an additional country. Usually participants are in their last two years of high school.

Competitors can qualify in several ways. These are: through direct application to their national debating and/or public speaking organization, through a national tournament, or if they belong to one of the founding schools, by their decision. Countries that have a more established debating and public speaking program often use qualifying competitions, which are extremely competitive. This is the method currently used by South Korea, Canada, the United States, Australia, Hong Kong, and South Africa. Alternatively, those with nascent or smaller programs rely on a handful of schools to select and send members; this includes Cyprus, Germany, and Pakistan.

Additionally, half of the team from the United States and Canada qualify through the International Independent Schools Public Speaking Championships. This competition is restricted to independent schools, and is of a similar format but of lesser significance and does not have competitor qualification requirements.

== Governance ==
The championships is managed by The Independent Public Speaking Association, or IPSA. The IPSA is composed of schools and leagues that participate in the tournament on a regular basis. The organization's predominant responsibility is to oversee the tournament, and decisions about Worlds are made by general consensus at an annual general meeting. IPSA is not involved in the particulars of each tournament, and aside from a basic rubric, host schools have considerable freedom in the tournament's execution.

IPSA also contains an Executive Council composed of the founding schools and schools that have attended three out of five years and hosted the competition. The Executive Council acts in an advisory capacity to host schools and when IPSA is unable to convene. It is responsible for the tournament's long-term sustainability.

== Past Championships ==
Year	Host School	Venue	Overall winner	English-as-Second-Language winner
1988	Reading Blue Coat School	Reading, England	(Canada) Joel Hechter	
1989	Reading Blue Coat School and Queen Anne's School	Reading, England	(Canada) Rob Goffin	
1990	Reading Blue Coat School and Queen Anne's School	Reading, England	(Canada) Atul Verma	
1991	Taunton School	Somerset, England	(United States) James Priory	
1992	Aylesbury Grammar School	Aylesbury, England	(Canada) David Gratzer	
1993	Reading Blue Coat School and Queen Anne's School	Reading, England	(Canada) Gary Harding	
1994	Taunton School	Somerset, England	(Canada) Jessica Riley	
1995	The English School, Nicosia	Nicosia, Cyprus	(Cyprus) Alex Michaelides	
1996	Reading Blue Coat School	Reading, England	(United States) Luke Jones	
1997	Taunton School	Somerset, England	(United States) Joanne McNally	
1998	Northlands School	Buenos Aires, Argentina	(Canada) Michael Kives	
1999	Maru a Pula School	Gaborone, Botswana	(Canada) Michael Kives	
2000	The English School, Nicosia	Nicosia, Cyprus	(Canada) Kristopher Ade	
2001	Queen Anne's School	Reading, England	(Canada) Elliot Tapper	
2002	Michaelhouse	Balgowan, South Africa	(United States) Daniel Wilner	
2003	Queen Anne's School	Reading, England	(Canada) Rowan Dorin	
2004	Wasatch Academy	Salt Lake City, United States	(Canada) Sarah Mortazavi	
2005	The English School, Nicosia	Nicosia, Cyprus	(United States) Zahid Sunderani	
2006	The Hotchkiss School	Lakeville, United States	(Canada) Shakir Rahim	
2007	Diocesan College (Bishops)	Cape Town, South Africa	(Canada) Shakir Rahim	
2008	Max-Born-Gymnasium and Lessing-Gymnasium	Backnang / Winnenden, Germany	(Canada) Seth Rosenberg	
2009	Reading Blue Coat School	Reading, England	(United Kingdom) Edward Hicks	
2010	Educational Debate Centre Lithuania	Druskininkai, Lithuania	(Canada) Zeenia Framroze	
2011	Moreton Bay Boys' College	Brisbane, Australia	(Canada) Nic Martin	
2012	Moreton Bay Boys' College	Brisbane, Australia	(Canada) Ryan Pistorius	
2013	Clifton School	Durban, South Africa	(Canada) Connor Campbell	
2014	Educational Debate Centre Lithuania	Druskininkai, Lithuania	(Canada) Daniel Huang	
2015	Hong Kong Schools’ Debating and Public Speaking Community	Hong Kong, China	(Canada) Samantha Starkey	
2016	Shady Side Academy	Pittsburgh, United States	(Canada) Natalie Ganzhorn	
2017	Ravenswood School for Girls	Sydney, Australia	(Canada) Olivia Railton	
2018	Diocesan College (Bishops)	Cape Town, South Africa	(Australia) Eleanor Lawton-Wade and (Canada) Megan Campbell (tie)	
2019	Branksome Hall	Toronto, Canada	(Canada) Anna Croxon	
2020	N/A	Online	(South Africa) Rohan Naidoo	
2021	Leaders Academy	Online	(Canada) Ruby Grinberg	(Lithuania) Milda Gadliauskaitė
2022	The Country Day School	Online	(Canada) Maria Ivoditova	(South Africa) Nimba Mahlati
2023	Clifton School	Durban, South Africa	(Canada) Erick Yang	(China) Pei Jin Zhou
2024	Canberra Girls Grammar School	Canberra, Australia	(Canada) Anna Gage	(Hong Kong) Erica Li
2025	Sunway Resort Hotel	Kuala Lumpur, Malaysia	(Canada) Helen Ziomecki	(South Korea) Seunghun Lee
2026	Clifton College	Bristol, United Kingdom	(Canada) Flora Pan	(China) Emma Lin

== Past Individual Event Winners ==
Year	Categories				
Year	Parliamentary Debate	Impromptu Speaking	Interpretive Reading	Persuasive Speaking	After-dinner Speaking
2010	(South Africa) Jessica Hichens	(United Kingdom) Thomas Diment	(Canada) Adam Litman	(Pakistan) Saad Sohail	(Cyprus) George Alexander Charalambous
2011	(United Kingdom) Tom Diment	(United States) Cameron Ewing	(Canada) Kristine Ramsbottom	(Hong Kong) Heather Pickerell	(United Kingdom) Oliver Kelham
2012	(Canada) Connor Campbell	(United States) Priyanka Sekhar	(Hong Kong) Lucien Wang	(South Africa) Natasha Dusabe	(Australia) Neil Kemister
2013	(South Africa) Joseph Kahn	(United States) Nicolo Marzaro	(Canada) Ryan Sherbo	(Lithuania) Eleonora Lekaviciute	(Australia) Emily Leijer
2014	(Australia) Christopher Skriols	(South Africa) Emma Buckland	(Canada) Stephanie Fennell	(South Africa) Lulutho Ngcongolo	(South Africa) Brendan Allan
2015	(Canada) Olivia Railton	(Australia) Anant Butala	(Canada) Imaan Kherani	(South Africa) Desmond Fairall	(Hong Kong) Shimali De Silva
2016	(United States) Eric Tang	(Canada) Elizabeth Roberts	(Australia) Nicole Sung	(South Africa) Rowan Mockler	(United States) Angela Xiao
2017	(Canada) Olivia Railton	(Canada) Liam Brown	(Cyprus) Lucas Irwin	(Australia) Jacqueline Farrel	(Cyprus) James Morphakis
2018	(Australia) Thomas Willingham	(United States) Auran Vatan	(Canada) Zaki Lakhani	(Australia) Samuel Roach	(South Africa) John van Niekerk
2019	(Canada) Andrei Comloson	(Canada) Lilian Borger	(South Africa) Julia Nhawu	(Canada) Anna Croxon	(Hong Kong) Markandeya Karthik
2020	(South Africa) Rohan Naidoo	(Australia) Thomas Fernando	(United States) Flo Auerbach	(Canada) Maylee Mann	(United States) Flo Auerbach
2021	(Canada) Angela Lu	(South Africa) Eugene Cloete	(Canada) Saara Chaudry	(Canada) Maria Ivoditova	(United States) McKenna Goodson
2022	(China) Caridee Chau	(United States) Emma Jean Hermacinski	(Australia) Kayleigh Lei	(Hong Kong) Nicholas Chung	(United States) Julia Shephard
2023	(South Africa) Ben Anderson	(United States) Thomas Harrick	(Canada) Edward Gao	(Canada) Evan Peters	(United States) Graham Bateman
2024	(Canada) Michelle Liu	(United States) Justin Ahn	(United States) Ethan Wahba	(Canada) Millie Steinman	(South Africa) Richard Leschner
2025	(China) Caridee Chau	(Canada) Sania Grewal	(Canada) Sania Grewal	(South Africa) Azwile Ngubo	(Australia) Jio Yim
2026	(South Africa) Jemma Tresling	(China) Madelyn Li	(United States) Siddharth Chopra	(South Africa) Samuel Clarke	(United States) Salar Sekhavat
