= Thomas Dolman =

English landowner and politician

Sir Thomas Dolman (13 January 1622 – 18 July 1697) was an English landowner and politician who sat in the House of Commons from 1661 to 1679.

Dolman was the son of Humphrey Dolman of Shaw House, Berkshire and his wife Anne Quarles, daughter of John Quarles, merchant of London. He matriculated at Lincoln College, Oxford on 26 October 1638, aged 16 and was a student of Lincoln's Inn in 1641. He was commissioner for assessment for Berkshire from January 1660 to 1680, commissioner for militia for Berkshire in March 1660, J.P. for Berkshire from July 1660 and Deputy Lieutenant for Berkshire from August 1660.

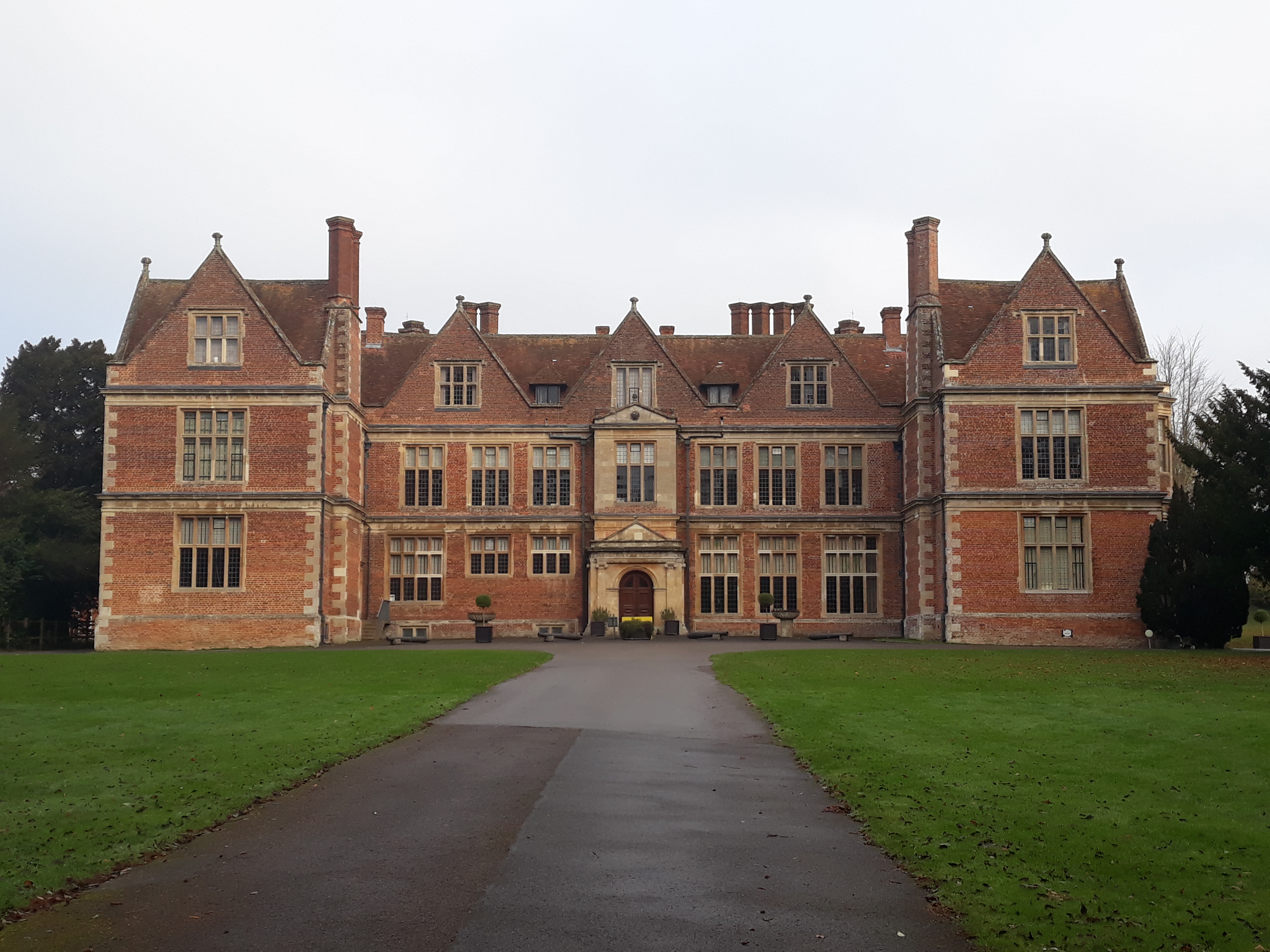
View of Shaw House

Dolman was knighted on 2 February 1661 and made freeman of Reading before being elected as Member of Parliament for Reading in the Cavalier Parliament of 1661. In 1664 he was a J.P. for Newbury 1664. He succeeded to his father's estate at Shaw in 1666. From 1669 to 1687 he was J.P. for Leicestershire and in 1671 he was J.P. for Newbury. He was a gentleman of the privy chamber from 1672 to 1685. From 1673 to 1680, he was commissioner for assessment for Leicestershire and in 1675 commissioner for recusants for Berkshire. He became clerk to the Privy Council extraordinary in 1676, and clerk to the Privy Council ordinary from 1677 to 1685. He was commissioner for assessment for Warwickshire from 1677 to 1680. In 1685 he was J.P. for Newbury 1685 again. In 1687 he was relieved of his lieutenancy and commissions of the peace. He was commissioner for assessment for Berkshire again from 1689 to 1690,

Dolman died at the age of 75 and was buried at Shaw.

Dolman married Margery Hobday, daughter of John Hobday of Thornton, Warwickshire in 1651 (she died on 21 January 1687). They had five sons and three daughters. The eldest daughter, Anne, married Sir Roger L'Estrange.

Parliament of England
Preceded by Thomas Rich; John Blagrave	Member of Parliament for Reading; 1661; With: Richard Aldworth	Succeeded by Nathan Knight; John Blagrave
