= Joseph Blagrave =

English author and astrologer (1610-1682)

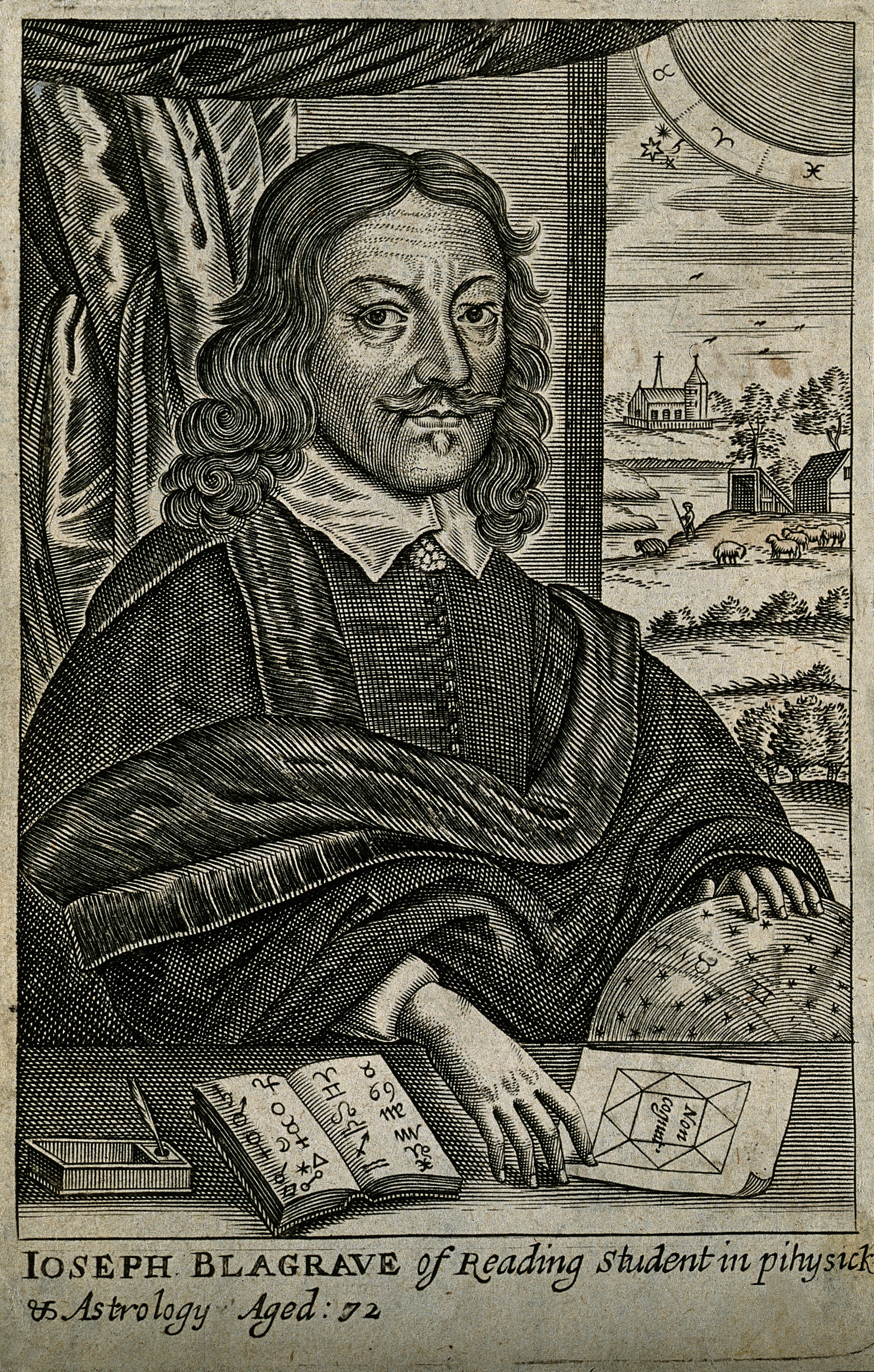
Joseph Blagrave, aged 72

Joseph Blagrave (1610–1682) was an English astrologer.

== Life ==
Little is known of Blagrave's life. He was born in Reading, Berkshire in 1610, the youngest of four sons of Alexander and Margaret Blagrave, of a branch of that family of Calcot Park near Reading; he was a nephew of the mathematician John Blagrave, from whom he is thought to have inherited a small estate in nearby Swallowfield.

He and his wife Susan had a son Joseph in May 1640; Susan died shortly afterwards, on 2 June.

In the article in the Dictionary of National Biography, Charles Henry Coote wrote "His character appears to have been a curious mixture of earnest piety with a profound belief in the virtues of astrology".

== Publications ==
- His first publications were a series of Ephemerides, with Rules for Husbandry for the years 1658, 1659, 1660, and 1665.
- He is thought to have written The Epitome of the Art of Husbandry, by J. B., gent. (London, 1669); it was edited by his nephew Obadiah Blagrave, a bookseller in St Paul's Churchyard, who published this and subsequent works of Joseph Blagrave.
- Blagrave’s Astrological Practice of Physick, (London, 1671, reprinted 1689). In the preface he wrote "Without some knowledge in astronomy one can be no astrologer, and without knowledge in astrology one can be no philosopher and without knowledge both in astrology and philosophy one can be no good physician, the practice of which must be laid upon the five substantial pillars of time, virtue, number, sympathy, and antipathy."

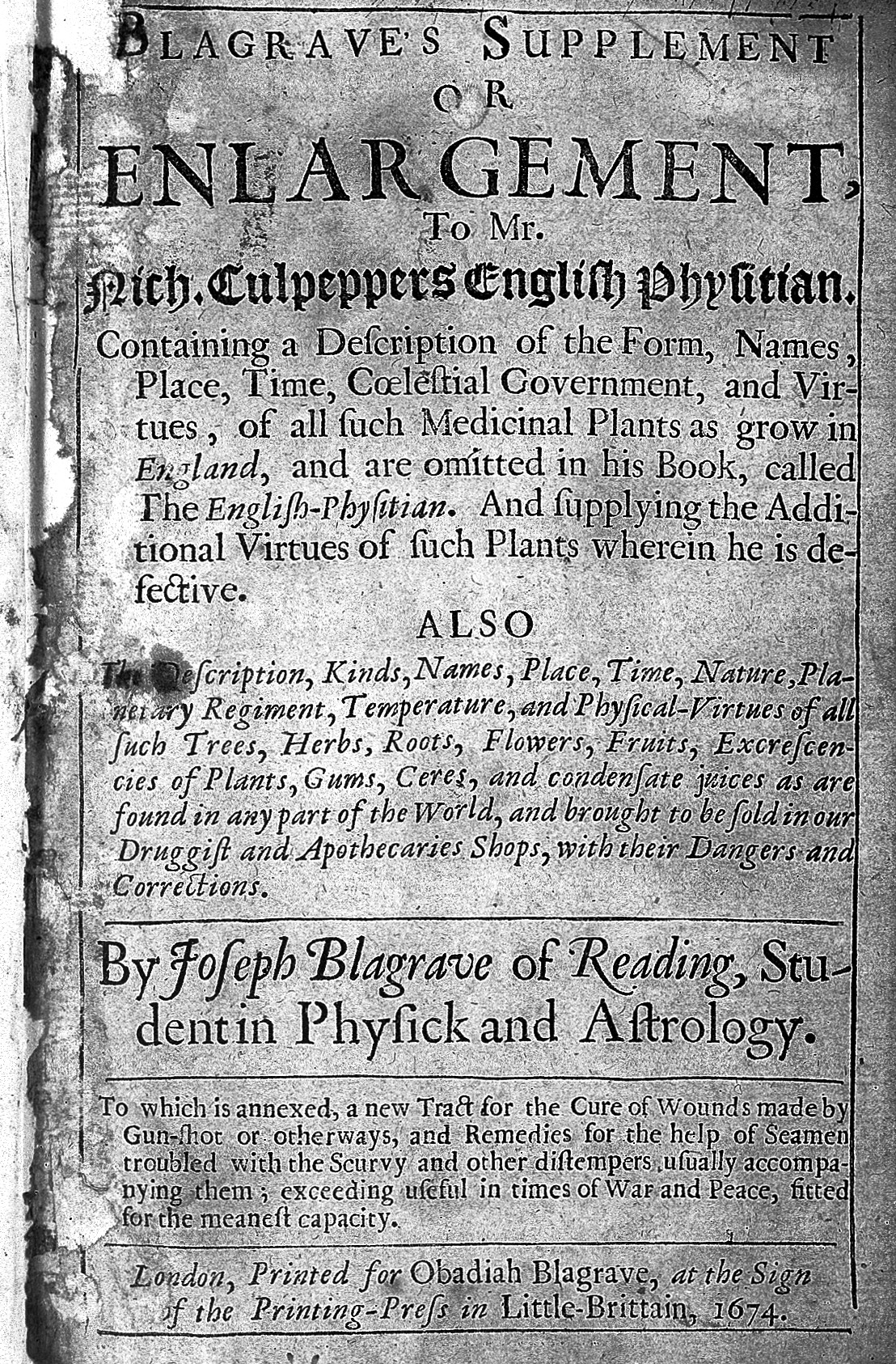
Title page

- Supplement or Enlargement to Mr. Nich. Culpepper's English Physitian (London, 1674). The preface to this work is dated "From my house called Copt Hall, upon the seven bridges in Reading".
- Blagrave's last and posthumously published work is Introduction to Astrology, in three parts (London, 1682). It contains an engraved portrait of Blagrave aged 72, and is dedicated to his friend Elias Ashmole.
