= List of mayors of Reading =

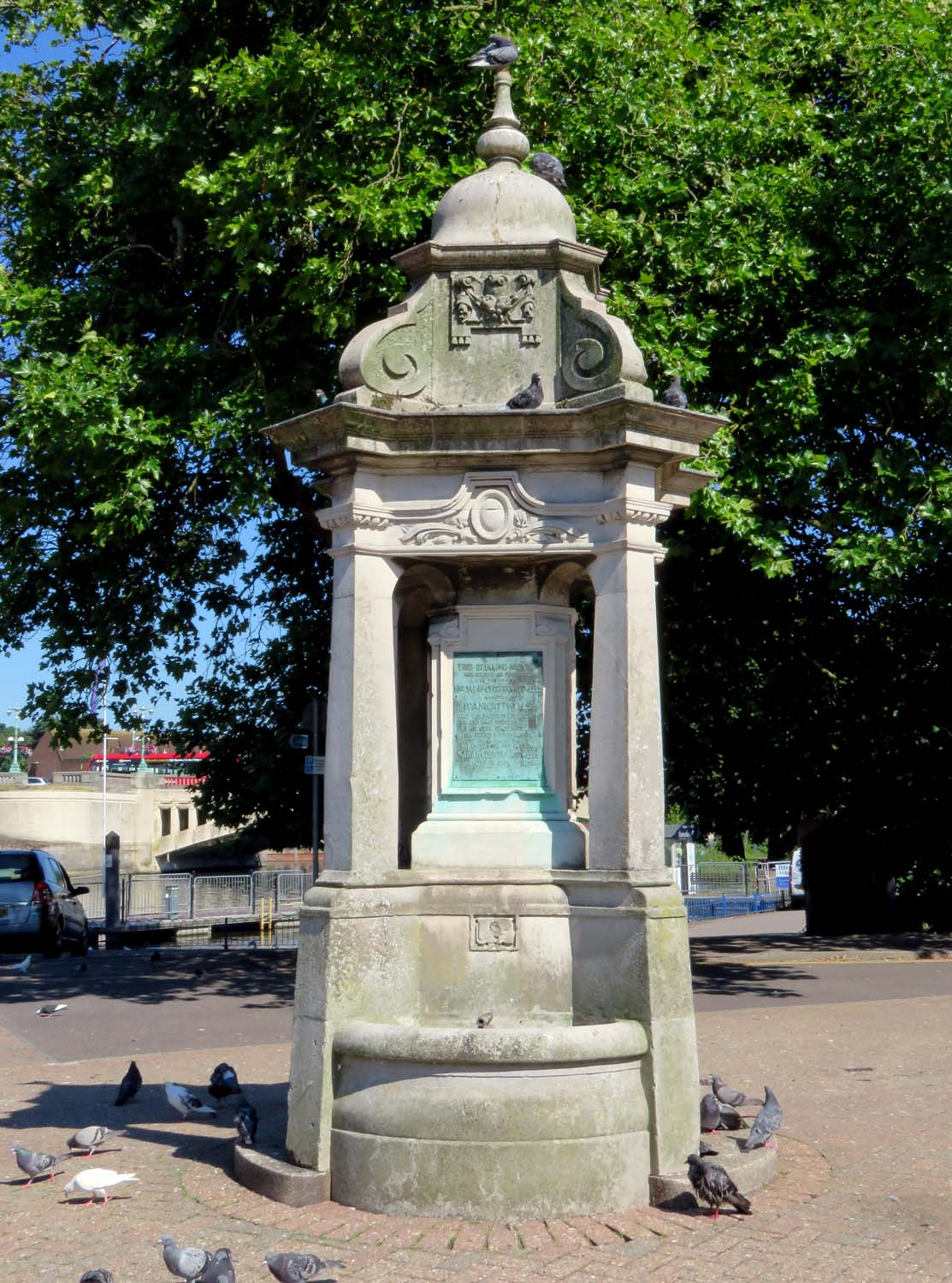
Memorial to Frank Atwells, who died in office in 1892

The Borough of Reading, in the English county of Berkshire, currently has a largely ceremonial mayor. The mayor is responsible for chairing full council meetings as well as representing the council at events, welcoming guests and visiting local organisations. However the role is an ancient one, being first recorded in the 14th century, and has many guises over the years. Former mayors include the following.

== Fourteenth century ==
- 1379 Richard Bedull
- 1382 David atte Hacche
- 1391 John Kent
- 1393 John Kent
- 1399 Robert Hay
- 1400 Robert Hay

== Fifteenth century ==
- 1401 John Huntingford or John Kent
- 1402 Robert Markham
- 1403 William Kennet
- 1404 John Hunt
- 1405 John Hunt or John Kent
- 1406 John Hunt (dubious)
- 1407 Robert Markham
- 1408 John Hunt (dubious)
- 1409 William Winton or John Kent
- 1410 Robert Levington
- 1411 John Huntingford
- 1412 Robert Hay
- 1413 William Huntingford
- 1414 John Clarke
- 1415 William Kennet
- 1416 John White
- 1417 John Hunt (dubious)
- 1418 Robert Morris
- 1419 William Winton
- 1420 William Winton
- 1421 William Huntingford
- 1422 Robert Morris Junior or John Hunt
- 1423 Thomas Levington
- 1424 Simon Porter
- 1425 John Burton
- 1426 Thomas Levington
- 1427 John Kirkby
- 1428 Simon Porter
- 1429 John Kirkby
- 1430 Simon Kent
- 1431 Simon Ladbrook
- 1432 John Kirkby
- 1433 Robert Morris
- 1434 John Kirkby
- 1435 Thomas Swayne
- 1436 William Hunt
- 1437 William Hunt
- 1438 William Bryssely
- 1439 William Selham
- 1440 John Vere
- 1441 Robert Morris
- 1442 Simon Porter
- 1443 William Selham
- 1444 Edward Lynacre
- 1445 William Bryssely
- 1446 William Hunt
- 1447 John West
- 1448 John Sayer
- 1449 Thomas Clarke
- 1450 John Chamberlain
- 1451 Simon Porter
- 1452 Edward Lynacre
- 1453 William Reade
- 1454 William Reade
- 1455 William Reade
- 1456 William Reade
- 1457 John Chamberlain
- 1458 Thomas Beke
- 1459 Thomas Beke
- 1460 Thomas Clarke
- 1461 Thomas Clarke
- 1462 Thomas Beke
- 1463 William Lynacre
- 1464 William Reade
- 1465 Thomas Clarke
- 1466 John Buck
- 1467 William Reade
- 1468 William Lynacre
- 1469 William Reade
- 1470 John Upston
- 1471 Robert Quedhampton
- 1472 William Lynacre
- 1473 John Upston
- 1474 William Pernecote
- 1475 William Pernecote
- 1476 Stephen Dunster
- 1477 William Lynacre
- 1478 John Baxter
- 1479 John Baxter
- 1480 William Lynacre
- 1481 Thomas Mill
- 1482 Stephen Dunster
- 1483 John Baxter
- 1484 John Langham
- 1485 John Langham
- 1486 John Langham
- 1487 John Langham or Richard Cleche
- 1488 John Langham
- 1489 John Langham
- 1490 John Baxter
- 1491 Christian Nicholas
- 1492 Christian Nicholas
- 1493 Christian Nicholas
- 1494 Christian Nicholas
- 1495 John Baxter
- 1496 John Baxter
- 1497 Christian Nicholas
- 1498 Richard Cleche
- 1499 Christian Nicholas
- 1500 John Wilcox

== Sixteenth century ==
- 1501 Thomas Buckeridge
- 1502 Richard Cleche (dubious)
- 1503 John Turner
- 1504 Thomas Carpenter
- 1505 Richard Cleche
- 1506 Thomas Carpenter
- 1507 Christian Nicholas
- 1508 Thomas Carpenter
- 1509 Thomas Carpenter
- 1510 William White
- 1511 William Gifford, (or Giffard, Jeffard)
- 1512 William Watts
- 1513 William Justice
- 1514 John Pownsar
- 1515 John Hopton
- 1516 Thomas Bye
- 1516 William Justice
- 1517 William Watts
- 1518 William Watts
- 1519 John Hopton
- 1520 William Gifford
- 1521 Thomas Everard
- 1522 Nicholas Hyde, MP for Reading, 1523
- 1523 Richard Turner
- 1524 William Gifford
- 1525 Thomas Everard
- 1526 Richard Aman
- 1527 Richard Turner
- 1528 John Vansby
- 1529 Thomas Everard
- 1530 Richard Aman
- 1531 Richard Turner
- 1532 William Style
- 1533 John Reade
- 1534 Thomas Everard
- 1534 Richard Turner
- 1535 Richard Aman
- 1536 John White
- 1537 Richard Turner
- 1538 Thomas Mirth
- 1539 Richard Justice
- 1540 William Edmunds
- 1541 Richard Turner
- 1542 John White
- 1543 Richard Turner
- 1544 John White or John Bourne
- 1545 Richard Justice
- 1546 John Bourne (dubious)
- 1547 John Bourne (dubious)
- 1548 John Bell
- 1549 John Buckland
- 1550 William Edmunds
- 1551 Thomas Aldworth
- 1552 John Bourne
- 1553 Robert Bowyer
- 1554 Edward Butler
- 1555 John Bell
- 1556 Thomas Turner
- 1557 Thomas Aldworth
- 1558 Robert Bowyer or John Bourne
- 1559 Edward Butler
- 1560 Thomas Turner
- 1561 Thomas Conyers or Thomas Aldworth
- 1562 John Bell
- 1563 John Buckland
- 1564 John Phipps
- 1565 John Kendrick
- 1566 Richard Watlington
- 1567 Thomas Turner
- 1568 Humphrey Jackson
- 1569 Richard Johnson
- 1570 Robert Bowyer
- 1571 Thomas Aldworth
- 1572 John Ockham
- 1573 William Lendall
- 1574 Richard Watlington
- 1575 Edward Butler
- 1576 Richard Aldworth
- 1577 William Fynnemore
- 1578 Richard Johnson
- 1579 John Webb
- 1580 Thomas Kendrick
- 1581 Edward Butler
- 1584 Richard Watlington
- 1583 Elizeus Burges
- 1584 Richard Aldworth
- 1585 Richard Turner
- 1586 William Fynnemore
- 1587 Richard Johnson
- 1588 Thomas Lydall
- 1539 Richard Watlington
- 1590 Robert Harris
- 1591 Thomas Deane
- 1592 Elizeus Burges
- 1593 Richard Aldworth
- 1593 Richard Watlington
- 1594 Richard Turner
- 1595 Robert Reave
- 1596 Barnard Harrison
- 1597 Thomas Lydall
- 1598 Robert Harris
- 1599 Thomas Deane
- 1600 John Blagg

== Seventeenth century ==
- 1601 Edward Burningham
- 1602 John Webb
- 1603 John Ball
- 1604 John Thorne
- 1605 Bernard Harrison
- 1606 Thomas Lydall
- 1607 Nicholas Gunter
- 1608 Thomas Deane
- 1609 John Blagg
- 1610 Edward Burningham
- 1611 Thomas Turner
- 1612 Richard Turner
- 1613 Robert Reeve
- 1614 William Malthus
- 1615 Robert Knight
- 1616 Christopher Turner
- 1617 William Iremonger
- 1618 Nicholas Gunter
- 1619 Walter Bateman
- 1620 Thomas Turner
- 1621 Anthony Knight
- 1622 Robert Malthus
- 1623 Robert Knight
- 1624 Christopher Turner
- 1625 William Iremonger
- 1626 Nicholas Gunter
- 1627 Nicholas Gunter
- 1628 Nicholas Gunter
- 1629 Walter Bateman
- 1630 Thomas Turner
- 1631 John Newman
- 1632 William Kendrick
- 1633 Roberl Malthus
- 1634 Robert Kent
- 1635 John Dewell
- 1636 George Thorne
- 1637 Anthony Brackstone
- 1638 Richard Burren
- 1639 John Jennings
- 1640 Thomas Harrison
- 1641 Peter Burningham
- 1642 Thomas Thackham
- 1643 William Brackstone
- 1644 Simon Dee
- 1645 George Wooldridge
- 1646 Richard Holloway
- 1647 John Harrison
- 1648 Thomas Bateman
- 1649 Peter Thorne
- 1650 James Arnold
- 1651 William Wilder
- 1652 John Webb
- 1653 Henry Frewin
- 1654 William Mills
- 1655 Thomas Cope
- 1656 Richard Alwright
- 1657 Richard Holloway
- 1658 Joel Stephens
- 1659 Joel Stephens
- 1660 Robert James
- 1661 Samuel Jemmet
- 1662 George Thorne
- 1663 Thomas Sickes
- 1664 Thomas Clenton
- 1665 Robert Creed
- 1666 Thomas Coates
- 1667 William Brackstone Junior
- 1668 Robert Tirrel
- 1669 Michael Reading
- 1670 Thomas Tilleard
- 1671 John Blake
- 1672 Richard Johnson
- 1673 Giles Pocock
- 1674 Samuel House
- 1675 George Goswell
- 1676 Reginald Thornborough
- 1677 Henry Stead
- 1678 Thomas Harrison
- 1679 David Webb
- 1680 Francis Tirrel
- 1681 Michael Reading
- 1682 John Thorne
- 1683 John Blake
- 1684 William Lambden
- 1685 Richard Johnson
- 1686 Giles Pocock
- 1687 Thomas Goswell
- 1688 Hugh Champion
- 1688 Charles Calverley
- 1689 Francis Tirrel
- 1690 John Thorne
- 1691 Richard Lambden
- 1692 John Saunders
- 1693 John Thorne Junior
- 1694 James Quarrington
- 1695 Samuel Watlington
- 1696 William Moore
- 1697 Thomas Oates
- 1698 Francis Browne
- 1699 Thomas Tirrel
- 1700 Francis Morgan

== Eighteenth century ==
- 1701 Robert Noake
- 1702 John Merrick MD
- 1703 William Wilder
- 1704 Moses Gill
- 1705 Luke Wise
- 1706 John Abery
- 1707 Francis Bristow
- 1708 Thomas Piercy
- 1709 Robert Parran
- 1710 Robert Blake
- 1711 Samuel Watlington
- 1712 Thomas Tirrel
- 1713 John Merrick MD
- 1714 William Wilder
- 1715 Moses Gill
- 1716 Luke Wise
- 1717 John Abery
- 1718 Thomas Piercy
- 1719 Robert Parran
- 1720 Robert Blake
- 1721 Richard Richards
- 1722 John Watts
- 1723 William Everett
- 1724 Luke Wise
- 1725 John Abery
- 1726 Thomas Piercy
- 1727 Richard Richards
- 1728 John Watts
- 1729 William Everett
- 1730 Jeriah Iremonger
- 1731 John Thorne
- 1732 Thomas Noake
- 1733 John Abery
- 1734 Abraham Watlington
- 1735 Edward Lambden
- 1736 John Spicer
- 1737 Thomas Piercy
- 1738 Richard Richards
- 1739 William Everett
- 1740 Jeria Iremonger
- 1741 John Thorp
- 1742 John Abery
- 1743 Abraham Watlington
- 1744 John Spicer
- 1745 Richard Tilleard
- 1746 William Armstrong
- 1747 John Dredge
- 1748 John Harrison
- 1749 Thomas Fiery
- 1750 John Richards
- 1751 John Hocker
- 1752 Harry Austin Deane
- 1753 Benjamin Armstrong
- 1754 Richard Fisher
- 1755 Abraham Watlington
- 1756 John Spicer
- 1757 Richard Tilleard
- 1758 John Hocker
- 1759 John Dredge
- 1760 John Richards
- 1761 Harry Auftin Deane
- 1762 Richard Fisher
- 1763 Richard Westbrook
- 1764 Francis Whitchurch
- 1765 Richard Tilleard
- 1766 John Coates
- 1767 Adam Smith
- 1768 William Blandy Senior
- 1769 John Dredge
- 1770 John Richards
- 1771 Richard Fisher
- 1772 Richard Westbrook
- 1773 Francis Whitchurch
- 1774 William Blandy Senior
- 1775 John Deane Senior
- 1776 John Everett
- 1777 Edward Skeate White
- 1778 William Knapp
- 1779 Thomas Deane
- 1780 Robert Micklem
- 1781 Edward Micklern
- 1782 Henry Deane
- 1783 Martin Annesley
- 1784 John Deane Junior
- 1785 John Taylor MD
- 1786 Thomas Hanson
- 1787 John Bulley
- 1788 Richard Maul
- 1789 Thomas Gleed
- 1790 William Knapp
- 1791 Thomas Deane
- 1792 Robert Micklem
- 1793 Henry Deane
- 1794 Martin Annesley
- 1795 John Bulley
- 1796 Richard Maul
- 1797 Thomas Gleed
- 1798 Charles Poulton
- 1799 Thomas West
- 1800 William Blandy

== Nineteenth century ==
- 1801 Richard Westbrook
- 1802 Richard Richards
- 1803 Lancelot Austwick
- 1804 George Gilbertson
- 1805 John Stevens
- 1806 Martin Annesley
- 1807 Richard Maul
- 1808 Thomas Gleed
- 1809 Charles Poulton
- 1810 William Blandy
- 1811 Richard Westbrook
- 1812 Lancelot Austwick
- 1813 George Gilbertson
- 1814 William Andrews Senior
- 1815 John Blandy
- 1816 William Blackall Simonds
- 1817 Thomas Sowdon
- 1818 Robert Harris
- 1819 Thomas Ward
- 1820 William Stephens
- 1821 Henry Deane
- 1822 Thomas Garrard
- 1823 William Andrews Senior
- 1824 Henry Simonds
- 1825 Herbert Lewis
- 1826 George Higgs
- 1827 William Quelch
- 1828 Musgrave Lamb
- 1829 Thomas Grint Curties
- 1830 John Jackson Blandy
- 1831 William Blandy
- 1832 John Lamball Dewe
- 1833 Thomas Lawrence
- 1834 John Neale
- 1835 Henry Hawkes
- 1836 William Tuppen
- 1837 Richard Billing
- 1838-39 Edward Hodge
- 1839-40 William Tiley, junior
- 1840-41 Thomas Rickford
- 1841-42 Samuel Chase
- 1842-43 William Blandy
- 1843-44 John Richard, junior
- 1844-45 John Yard Willats
- 1845-46 James Allaway
- 1846-47 Thomas Morris
- 1847-48 John Weedon
- 1848-49 Thomas Harris
- 1849-50 Henry Adams
- 1850-52 William Silver Darter
- 1852-53 John Demezy Goodchild
- 1853-54 William Brown
- 1854-55 William Exall
- 1855-56 Timothy Lorkin Walford
- 1856-57 Thomas harris
- 1857-58 George Palmer
- 1858-59 Charles James Andrewes
- 1859-60 Henry Adolphus Simonds
- 1860-61 James Boorne
- 1861-62 Robert Hewett
- 1862-63 John Okey Taylor
- 1863-64 Lewis Cooper
- 1864-65 Charles James Butler
- 1865-66 Edward Blackwell
- 1866-67 Henry John Simonds
- 1867-68 John Talwin Morris
- 1868-69 John Wells Hounslow
- 1869-71 Sir Peter Spokes
- 1871-73 Henry Bilson Blandy
- 1873-74 Alexander Beale
- 1874-76 Charles Smith
- 1876-77 William Hood
- 1877-78 James Silver
- 1878-80 Henry Bilson Blandy
- 1880-81 George William Colebrook
- 1881-82 John Messer
- 1882-83 Blackall Simonds
- 1883-87 Arthur Hill
- 1887-88 William Berkley Monck
- 1888-89 George William Palmer
- 1889-90 John Thomas Dodd
- 1890-91 Daniel Heelas
- 1891-92 Frank Attwells (died in office on 25 August 1892)
- 1891-92 Daniel Heelas, former deputy mayor.
- 1892-93 John Wessley Martin
- 1893-94 Charles Gyningham Field
- 1894-96 Owen Ridley
- 1896-97 William Ferguson
- 1897-98 William Berkeley Monck
- 1898-99 William George Wellma
- 1899–1900 W. Poulton

== Twentieth century ==
- 1900-1903: A. Holland Bull, JP (Liberal Unionist) (three terms)
- 1904-1905: Martin John Sutton
- 1905-1907: Edward Jackson
- 1919: Sir George Stewart Abram
- 1931: Edward Oliver Farrer
- 1933: Edith Sutton
- 1934: Frederick William Allwright (died in office on 13 November 1934)
- 1946: Phoebe Cusden
- 1951-1952: Thomas William Knight
- 1956: Arthur Lockwood
- 1969-1970: Edith Ella Lovett
- 1970-1971: Herbert (Bert) Williams
- 1971-1972: William Wykeham Edward Badnall
- 1972-1973: Ivy Sylvia (Silvia) Blagrove
- 1973-1974: John Rees (Jack) Price
- 1974-1975: Reginald Harry (Joe) Bristow
- 1975-1976: Geoffrey David Salisbury
- 1976-1977: Kathleen Lucy Sage
- 1977-1978: William George (Bill) Mander
- 1978-1979: Ronald James (Jim) Day
- 1979-1980: Charles Frederick Sage
- 1980-1981: Marian Jeanne Absolom
- 1981-1982: Leslie Basil Dunning
- 1982-1983: George Frank Robinson
- 1983-1984: Doris Ellen Lawrence
- 1984-1985: Ronald William Jewitt
- 1985-1986: Brian Anthony Fowles
- 1986-1987: Janet Brenda Bond
- 1987-1988: Doris Ellen Lawrence
- 1988-1989: Kathleen Margaret (Kay) Everett
- 1989-1990: Maureen Lockey
- 1990-1991: Geoffrey Walter Canning
- 1991-1992: Robert Stephen Dimmick
- 1992-1993: Adel Hamza Fuad (Former Conservative, but expelled from party in 1991.)
- 1993-1994: Rajinder Sohpal
- 1994: George Henry Ford (Died after 22 days in post.)
- 1994-1995: John Michael Oliver
- 1995-1996: David Llewellyn Geary
- 1996-1997: Ronald James (Jim) Day
- 1997-1998: Rosemary Phyllis (Rose) Williams
- 1998-1999: David Llewellyn Geary
- 1999-2000: Stephen Peter (Steve) Waite
- 2000-2001: Robert James (Bob) Green

== Twenty-first century ==
- 2001: Tony Jones
- 2002: Liz Winfield-Chislett
- 2003: Jeanette Skeats
- 2004: Richard Stainthorp
- 2005: Riaz Chaudhri
- 2006: Bet Tickner
- 2007: (Note: Cllr Maskell would quit the Labour Party in 2022, remaining as an independent for the rest of his time on the council.) Chris Maskell
- 2008: Peter Beard
- 2009: Fred Pugh
- 2010: Gul Khan
- 2011: Deborah Edwards
- 2012: Jenny Rynn
- 2013: Marion Livingston
- 2014: Tony Jones
- 2015: (Note: Cllr Hacker would be expelled from the Labour Party in 2023, and sat as an independent for the remainder of her term.) Sarah Hacker
- 2016: Mohammed Ayub
- 2017: Rose Williams
- 2018: Deborah Edwards
- 2019: Paul Woodward
- 2020: (Note: Cllr Stevens switched to the Labour Party in 2022) David Stevens
- 2021: Rachel Eden
- 2023: Tony Page
- 2024: Glenn Dennis
- 2025: Dr Alice Mpofu-Coles
