= Watlington House =

Listed building in Reading, England

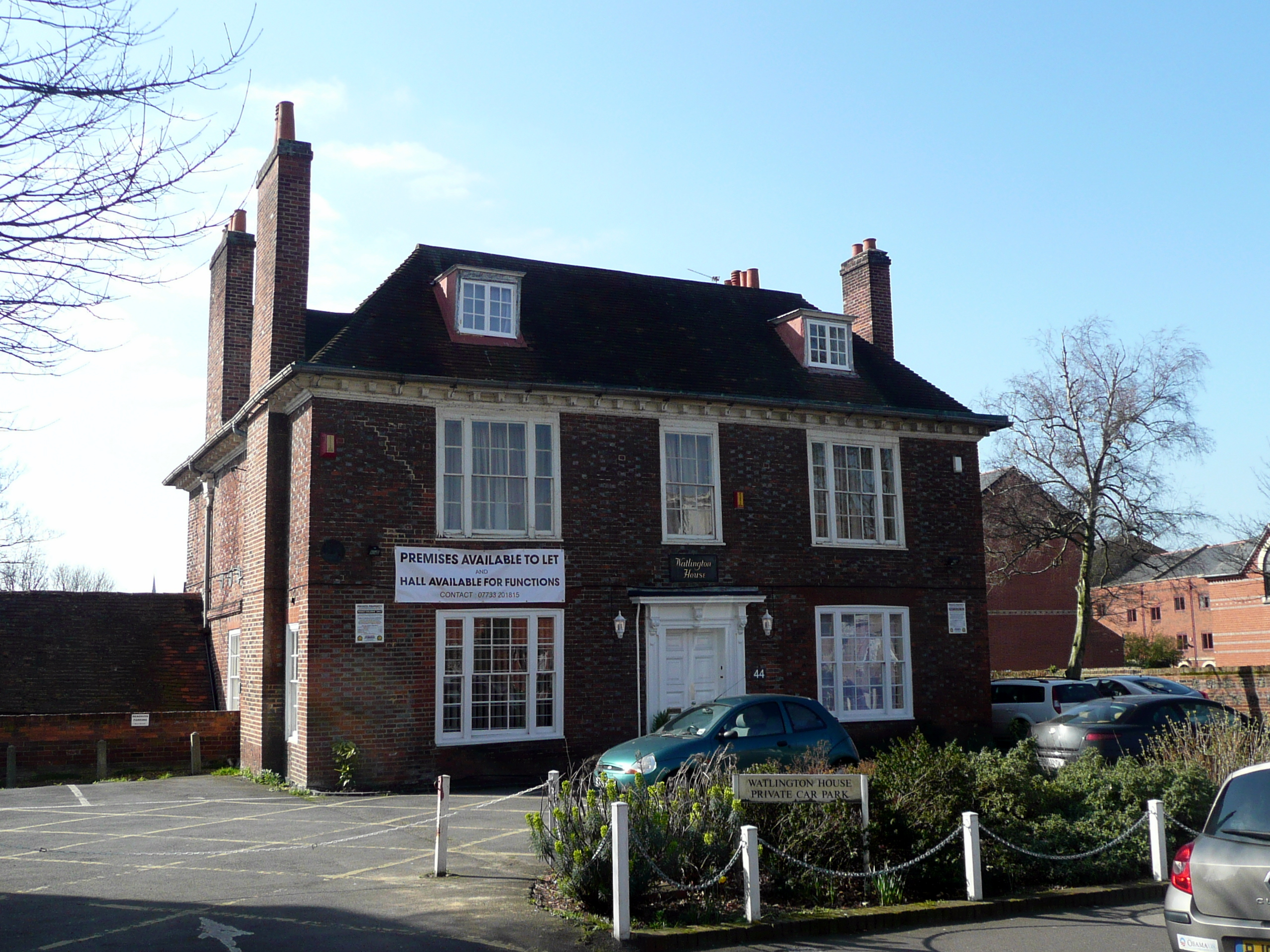
- Watlington House frontage

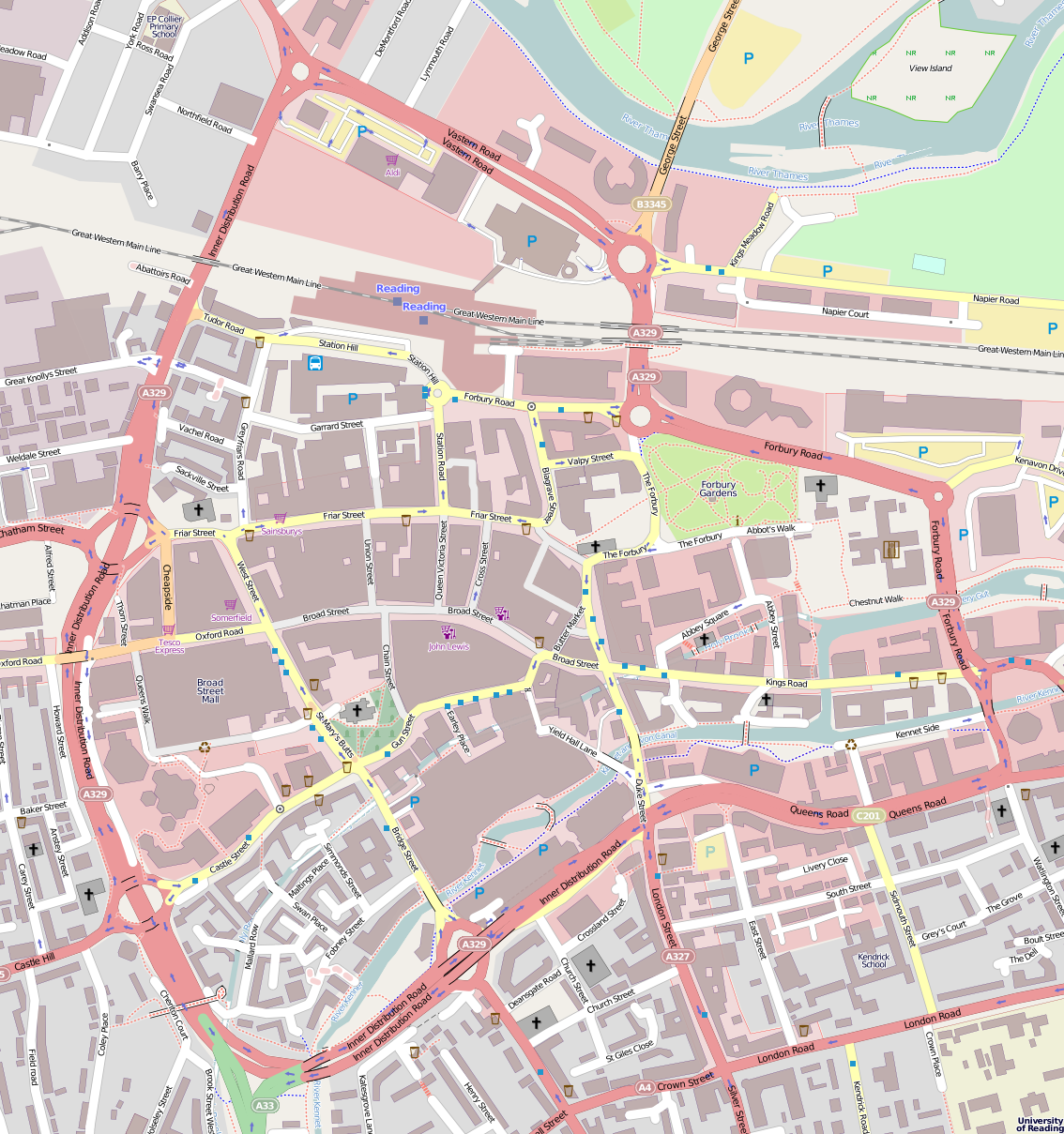
- Location within Reading Central

General information
- Location: Reading, Berkshire, England
- Coordinates: 51.452874°N 0.961642°W
- Construction started: 1688
- Completed: 1711

Website
- www.watlingtonhouse.org.uk

Listed Building – Grade II*
- Official name: Watlington House
- Designated: 22 March 1957
- Reference no.: 1321898

Watlington House is a 17th-century building, with a large walled garden, in the town of Reading in the English county of Berkshire. The building is brick built and is reputed to be the oldest surviving secular building in the town. It is a Grade II* listed building.

The western or rear part of the building was built in 1688 for Samuel and Anne Watlington, whilst the eastern part, fronting onto Watlington Street, is said to date from 1763. Samuel Watlington served as Mayor of Reading in 1695 and again in 1711.

Trustees do not know the date of the low timber-framed "farm house" which is attached to the south side of the 1680s house; it appears to be older. It does not feature on the English Heritage listing details.

The first recorded occupant of the house was Captain Edward Purvis in 1794, renting the house for £25 annually. He fought at the Battle of Corunna in the Peninsular War with the 4th Regiment of Foot and trained the Berkshire Militia in Orts meadow near his home. The house is rumoured to be haunted by his ghost. After Captain Purvis, the house was variously occupied by a Mrs Stevens and then used as an office by the town clerk of Reading.

In 1877 the house became the first home of the newly founded Kendrick Girls School. The school remained on the site until 1927, when they moved to their current location on the corner of Sidmouth Street and London Road. During their stay they erected a corrugated iron hall in the garden, which is used by various groups to this day.

Since 1931 the building has been owned by local trustees. They provide accommodation for social and educational organisations (e.g. Guide & Scouts Associations, the Berkshire Association of WIs), using the rents for the upkeep of Watlington House.

In 1957 it was designated a Grade II* listed building.

During 2012–2014, the rear garden was re-imagined from a grass car park to a garden which reflected a physic garden of a house from the 1680s. The design layout draws on evidence found on the grounds. Before this work was done in the west of the garden, next to the Grade II walls, some air raid shelters were removed and Thames Water excavated to establish effluent balancing tanks to service the growing local community.

Since 2003 the house has been the home of the Mills Archive, the national repository for documents, images and other records on mills, milling and the historical uses of traditional power sources along with other tenants. As at early 2025 there are five groups occupying the house; The Mills Archive, Weston & Co Architects, Berkshire Youth, the Forces Charity, Whitley Arts Community Group and St Mungo's.

The Garden Hall is used by local groups such as yoga, dance, and keep fit. Parties and wedding celebrations have also been held. There is now also a separate small meeting room available to hire.

In May 2020, the trustees agreed to improve the presence of the building as it faces Watlington Street by erecting a perimeter wall and railings and a central gate. This reflects, but not copy, the wall and central gate which is known to have been in situ in the 1920s. The opening ceremony for the new gate and walls was undertaken on 8 November 2021 by the High Sheriff of Berkshire (Willie Hartley Russell MVO DL) and the then Mayor of Reading (Cllr David Stevens).

In January 2021, the Garden Hall started to be used for the Coronavirus Vaccination Programme by two Primary Care Networks (Reading Central and Whitley). COVID booster and flu jabs continued through to 2022.

Trustees continue to invest in the maintenance of the house, the Grade II walls and the garden.

== See also ==
- Grade II* listed buildings in Berkshire
