= Michael Kives =

Canadian investor and facilitator (born 1981)

- Born: February 1, 1981 (age 45)
- Education: Stanford University
- Occupations: Investor, talent agent
- Employer: K5 Global
- Spouse: Lydia Gray (m. 2018)
- Relatives: Philip Kives (uncle)

Michael Kives (born February 1, 1981) is a Canadian investor and former talent agent; he is known for his extensive network and influential connections.

== Early life and education ==
Kives grew up in Winnipeg, Manitoba. He went to St. John's-Ravenscourt School in Winnipeg. He was active on the debating team, and won the World Individual Debating and Public Speaking Championships in 1998 and 1999. After reading books about entertainment players David Geffen, Michael Ovitz and Barry Diller, he decided from an early age he wanted to be a talent agent. He went to Stanford, where he met the Clintons. President Bill and Hillary Clinton came in for daughter Chelsea's 2001 graduation. He found a way to cover the story for the college newspaper, and this led to a longstanding relationship with the Clintons.

== Career ==
After graduating Phi Beta Kappa from Stanford, his first job was as an interim spokesperson for former President Clinton at his Harlem, New York office. This was followed by working as an aide for Senator Hillary Clinton at her D.C. office. His first media break was getting a job in the Creative Artists Agency (CAA) mailroom. Being Canadian he needed a work visa, and CAA made an exception to their standard practice to sponsor him for one. He spent 15 years there, working his way up to agent, representing Katy Perry, Arnold Schwarzenegger, Jesse Eisenberg and Bruce Willis, among others. He left in 2018 to co-found a media and financial investment-advisory firm, K5 Global. In June, 2023, K5 reported over $1 billion in managed assets and investments in 148 companies apart from funds linked to FTX.

He has been described as a super connector. He introduces clients to "a who's who of business and social leaders, from Leonardo DiCaprio to the governor of the Saudi Arabia Public Investment Fund."

A beneficiary of Kives' network was Sam Bankman-Fried, the former FTX CEO. Bankman-Fried was connected to MasterClass, President Clinton, Orlando Bloom, Nelson Peltz, Bobby Kotick, Larry Fink, and Katy Perry, among others. The relationship between Kives and Bankman-Fried has been noted to be mutually beneficial. Bankman-Fried invested $700 million in K5 Global, with Kives receiving $125 million as part of the deal. Bankman-Fried was alleged to have said Kives was “something of a one-stop shop for relationships that we should utilize.” On June 22, 2023, FTX bankruptcy lawyers sued to claw back the $700 million, claiming that the investment was made to burnish his own political and social influence. In January 2025 FTX reached a settlement with K5 resolving the lawsuit. FTX CEO John Ray called K5 a bright spot in the FTX portfolio and stated that the investment in K5 will play a large role in the recovery of FTX.

== Personal life ==
Kives married Lydia Gray in 2018. Gray is a civil rights lawyer with a focus on criminal justice and First Amendment issues, and a graduate of Stanford Law. Guests at the wedding included the Clintons, who gave a speech together.

Kives was a major fund-raiser for Hillary Clinton in the 2016 campaign, bundling more than $5 million.

Kives has two homes in Southern California; a $12.7 million house in Beverly Hills and a $9.1 million historic Tudor-style home in Montecito, known as the Porter House.

He is the nephew of the founder of K-Tel Records, Philip Kives.
