= Thomas Aldworth =

16th-century English politician

Thomas Aldworth (fl. 1520–1577) was a clothier and leading citizen of the town of Reading in the English county of Berkshire. He held the office of Mayor of Reading in 1551–52, 1557–58, 1561–62 and 1571–72. He was a member (MP) of the parliament of England for Reading in 1558 and 1559. In his role as Mayor, Aldworth received Edward VI when he visited the town on 12 September 1552.

Thomas Aldworth is likely to be the son of Robert Aldworth, a tanner of Wantage, then also in Berkshire. Thomas had houses and property in Reading, a house in Wantage that he inherited from his father, and property elsewhere in Berkshire, together with a house on Watling Street in London. Other members of the Aldworth family continued to represent Reading in parliament, including Richard Aldworth in 1661, Richard Neville Aldworth Neville in 1747, and Richard Aldworth-Neville in 1782. In 1797, Richard Aldworth-Neville succeeded to the Barony of Braybrooke.
