= Alworth =

Alworth may refer to:

- Alworth, Illinois, unincorporated community in the United States
- Lance Alworth (born 1940), American former football player

== See also ==
- Alworths, former UK retail store chain
- Allworth (disambiguation)
- Aldworth (disambiguation)
