= Richard Justice (MP) =

16th-century English politician

Richard Justice (by 1488 – 1548/49), of Reading, Berkshire, was an English politician. He was Mayor of Reading in 1539-40 and 1543–4. He was a Member (MP) of the Parliament of England for Reading in 1542.

Parliament of England
Preceded by Thomas Vachell; John Raymond	Member of Parliament for Reading; 1542; With: Thomas Vachell	Succeeded by Thomas Vachell; Roger Amyce
