= Richard Bedull =

English politician

Richard Bedull (fl. 1388), of Reading, Berkshire, was an English politician.

== Career ==
Bedull was Mayor of Reading in 1379–80. He was a member (MP) of the parliament of England for Reading in February 1388.
