= John Bourne (died 1558) =

English politician, MP for Reading

John Bourne (c. 1508 – 1558) was an English politician.

He lived in Reading, Berkshire where he was constable in 1530, alderman in 1542 and mayor for 1544–45, 1552–53 and 1558–59. He was elected a member (MP) of the parliament of England for Reading in March 1553 and November 1554.
