= Ali ibn Khalaf =

Andalusian astronomer

Alī ibn Khalaf (Arabic: علي بن خلف الأندلسي) was an Andalusian astronomer who belonged to the scientific circle of Ṣāʿid al- Andalusī.

He devised, with help from al-Zarqali, the universal astrolabe. Both Khalaf and al-Zarqali's design were included in the Libros del Saber (1227) of Alfonso X of Castile.
