= William Gifford (MP for Reading) =

16th-century English politician

William Gifford or Jeffard (by 1489 – 1538 or later) was an English politician.

He was Mayor of Reading for 1511–12, 1520–21 and 1524–25, and elected a member (MP) of the parliament of England for Reading in 1512.
