= Samuel Watlington =

Samuel Watlington (fl. 1688–1711) was a cloth merchant and leading citizen of the town of Reading in the English county of Berkshire. He held the office of Mayor of Reading in 1695 and 1711. In 1688, he and his wife Anne had Watlington House, reputed to be the oldest surviving secular building in Reading, built.
