= Nicholas Hyde (died 1528) =

Member of the Parliament of England

Nicholas Hyde (c.1489 – 1528), of Reading, Berkshire was an English Member of Parliament.

Hyde represented Reading in 1523 and was Mayor of Reading in 1522–23.
