= John Blagrave =

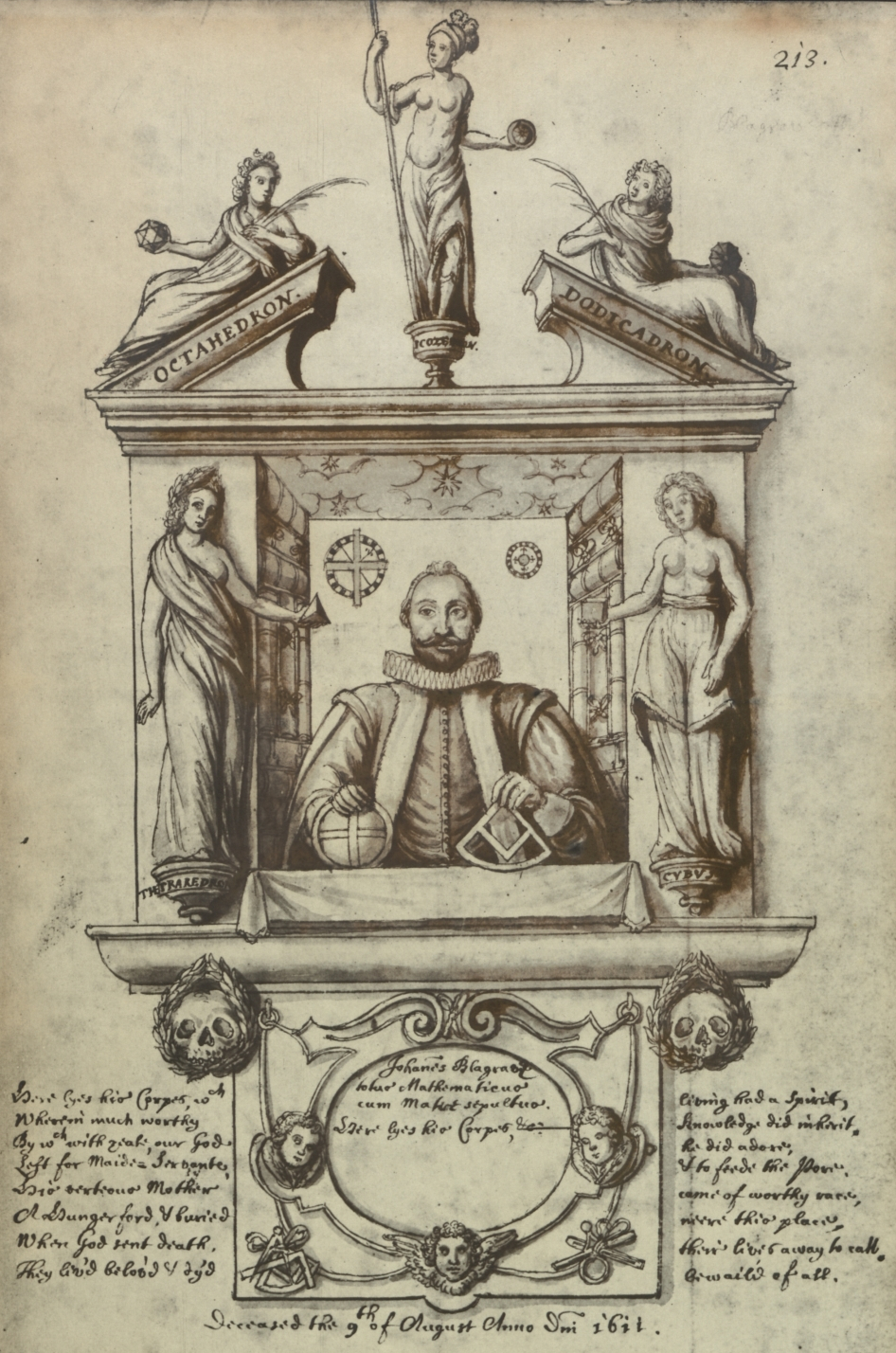
- Drawing of the funerary monument to John Blagrave in St Laurence's Church, Reading. Commissioned by Blagrave, the monument shows him surrounded by five female statuettes holding the five platonic solids.
- Born: Sometime in the 1560s Reading, Berkshire
- Died: 9 August 1611; Reading, Berkshire
- Resting place: St Laurence's Church in Reading, Berkshire
- Citizenship: English
- Education: Reading School, St John's College
- Known for: The Mathematical Jewel
- Spouse: Dorothy Blagrave (née Gunter)
- Scientific career
- Fields: Mathematics, astronomy, design of instruments
- Notable students: William Backhouse

John Blagrave of Reading (d. 1611) was an English Tudor mathematician, astronomer and designer of astronomical and mathematical instruments. His astrolabe designs, which he described in his writings, were advanced for Britain. He devoted himself to mathematical study and was called, by Anthony à Wood, "the flower of mathematicians of his age"

== Biography ==
John Blagrave was born as the second son to John Blagrave of Bullmarsh and Anne (daughter of Sir Anthony Hungerford of Down Ampney) in Berkshire at an unknown date sometime in the 1560s. The Blagraves were a branch of that landed gentry family of Calcot Park, Berkshire. He was educated in Reading School and went to St John's College, Oxford for an education in mathematics, though he never received a degree.

Blagrave married the widow Dorothy Gunter (daughter of Simon Gunter of Milton Lilbourne in Wiltshire). He had no issue himself but had a step-daughter, Jane, from his wife. In 1591, his father gave him a lease on some Southcote lands for ninety nine years.

Blagrave died on 9 August 1611 at Southcot Lodge. He was buried next to his mother at the Church of St. Lawrence in Reading, lying under a large monument to himself with a bust and several mathematically allegorical figures surrounding him (see portrait above). This monument was commissioned in his will and carried out by Gerard Christmas. Engraved under his bust is the inscription "Johannes Blagravius, totus mathematicus, cum matre sepultus".^{:309}

In his will, Blagrave left his lease on lands at Southcot to his nephew, the regicide Daniel Blagrave. He left money to more than eighty of his relatives. He also left much to charity and commissioned the monument to himself. A piazza was also built in 1619, outside of the Church of St. Lawrence, upon Blagrave's will, though it was destroyed in 1868.

== Work ==
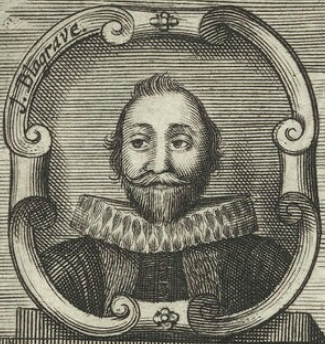
Engraving of John Blagrave by D. Loggan, 1658. From the frontispiece of John Palmer's reprint of The Mathematical Jewel as Planispherium Catholicum. Likely based on his funerary monument.

Five works of Blagrave survive (see below) along with a sheet map of the Northern Hemisphere.

The earliest of Blagrave's works, The Mathematical Jewel, is his most famous. Describing, in detail, an advanced universal astrolabe of Blagrave's design - incorporating the designs of earlier astrolabists. The 'jewel' consisted of four movable parts - Mater, Rete, Label, and Rule - which were lavishly illustrated in the book's frontispiece and engraved plates. The 'jewel's' uses were described in the third book as being used for anything from trigonometry, to navigation, to astrology; in Blagrave's words from the 'jewel' one could draw "so infinite a number of conclusions, more than I thinke I shall ever have time to write". The astrolabe contains some significant similarities to the universal astrolabe of Andalusian astrolabist Ali ibn Khalaf and David A. King has suggested that Blagrave copied his design for the 'Jewel' from ibn Khalaf.

Another of Blagrave's works, The art of dyalling, is notable as it contains one of the earliest descriptions of the construction of a sundial.

Aside from his mathematical work, Blagrave was also a prominent student of astrology - as evidenced in his book's advertisements of the astrological capabilities of his astronomical instruments. Genealogist Lady Russell reports that Blagrave influenced the prominent hermeticist William Backhouse (who he taught mathematics) towards the study of astrology in a manuscript he wrote to him^{:124} but future scholars, such as J. H. Costen, have been unable to locate this manuscript.

== Charity ==
Blagrave gave much to charity in his will, leaving a large sum of money to his servants and the local poor of Reading. He also left a large sum to his local church, St. Laurence's.

One of Blagrave's more eccentric charitable contributions was his lottery that awarded a sum of money to an unmarried Reading maidservant annually. This lottery was set up with funds from Blagrave's will and it continued up until the 19th century upon Balgrave's contribution. Three maidservants of good character and five year's service to one master were selected by the three parishes of Reading. The lot was held on Good Friday in the town hall, where one of the women would be selected by luck - with the two other women being able to participate the next year.

== Bibliography ==
- The mathematical ievvel, shewing the making, and most excellent vse of a singuler instrument so called (London, 1585)
- Baculum Familliare, Catholicon sive Generale. A Booke of the making and use of a Staffe, newly invented by the Author, called the Familiar Staffe (London, 1590)
- Astrolabium Uranicum generale: a necessary and pleasant solace and recreation for navigators in their long jorneying (London, 1596)
- Nova Orbis Terrarium Descriptio (London, 1596) (Map)
- An apollogie confirmation explanation and addition to the Vranicall astrolabe (London, 1597)
- The art of dyalling in two parts (London, 1609)
