= Daniel Blagrave =

- Born: 1603; Berkshire, England
- Died: 1668 (aged 65); Aachen, Germany

Daniel Blagrave (1603–1668) was a prominent resident of the town of Reading, in the English county of Berkshire. He was Member of Parliament for the Parliamentary Borough of Reading over several periods between 1640 and 1660, and was also one of the signatories of King Charles I's death warrant.

He was the son of fourth Alexander Blagrave of Reading and is wife Margaret. Joseph Blagrave, the astrologer, was his younger brother. Daniel Blagrave was educated at Reading School and trained to be a lawyer. The mathematician John Blagrave of Southcote Lodge, was his uncle and Daniel succeeded his uncle and father in the lease of the property.

He married Elizabeth, daughter of Alexander Hull, a London merchant with whom he had several children. Their son, also Daniel, matriculated at St John's College, Oxford in 1650 and became a Middle Temple barrister in 1656.

On the outbreak of the English Civil War his family were on the side of Parliament. During the siege of Reading, he permitted Robert Devereux, 3rd Earl of Essex to make his headquarters at Southcote Manor, the home of Daniel's elder brother John. He was Recorder of Reading from 1645 to 1656 and again from 1658. In 1654 he, his wife and his son Daniel were all summoned to appear as witnesses before the commission examining the alleged heterodoxy of John Pordage, towards whom Blagrave was apparently sympathetic.

During the Commonwealth, Daniel Blagrave held various commissions and posts, and is said to have become a very wealthy man as a consequence. His acquisitions included Cardiff Hall, an estate in the parish of St Ann Jamaica.

On the restoration of King Charles II, Daniel Blagrave fled the country and settled at Aachen, in what is now Germany, where he died in 1668. His estate having been forfeited on his attainder, his wife Elizabeth petitioned the House of Commons for support in June 1660. His descendants retained his Jamaican estate.
