= The Blue Coat School (Basingstoke) =

Coordinates: 51°15′14″N 01°06′54″W

The Blue Coat School Basingstoke

Location
- Western Way; Basingstoke, RG22 6HA

Information
- Type: Academy
- Motto: "Respect, Endeavor, Achieve"
- Established: September 1963
- Founder: Richard Aldworth
- Trust: South Farnham Educational Trust
- Department for Education URN: 150839 Tables
- Ofsted: Reports
- Head teacher: Jane Halsey
- Staff: 117
- Gender: Mixed
- Age: 11 to 16
- Enrolment: 925
- Colours: Navy and white
- Website: https://www.tbcsbasingstoke.org

The Blue Coat School is a secondary school in Basingstoke, Hampshire, England. It was formerly known as Aldworth School, Aldworth Science College and Richard Aldworth Community School.

== History ==
The history of The Blue Coat School Basingstoke can be traced back to 1646, when the Blue Coat School was opened in Cross Street (originally Cow Cross Lane). It was due to an Alderman of the City of London named Richard Aldworth (whose mother, Jane South, was from Basingstoke) that the school was able to open, when he left £2000 in his will. The school provided education for ten boys from underprivileged backgrounds. The boys were educated, clothed and fed from the age of 7 until they 16, when they would be found jobs or enrolled in apprenticeship schemes. The school got its name from the distinctive uniforms the boys wore.

In 1811, the Blue Coat School was incorporated into the National Schools system and forced to share its building with National boys. The master at the time, William Brown, (1801–1814) complained that it was not cost efficient to continue to educate the Blue Coat boys. In 1862, the school was rebuilt to accommodate 292 children, including girls who transferred from the National School in Church Square. However, standards in the school continued to decline and in 1876 the decision was taken to close the Blue Coat School after the remaining six pupils were placed in 1879. The building continued to be used as a school until 1896, when it closed due to bankruptcy. The building was leased to a shoemaker and eventually sold to the Aldworth Printing Works in 1926. The building was demolished during the town development in 1966. In 1994, on the site of the old school, a statue of a 'Blue Coat Boy' was unveiled. This was cast from a mould of another statue at the larger Blue Coat School in Reading, also founded by Richard Aldworth.

A new school was built in 1963 on Western Way called Richard Aldworth School and a stone plaque from the Old Blue Coat School building was incorporated in the main entrance. However, this is the only historical connection the Western Way school has with the old Blue Coat School. This later became Richard Aldworth Community School. In 2005, the school gained status as a Specialist Science College and changed its name to Aldworth Science College. In 2013, the government Specialist School scheme ended and the school's name became Aldworth School.

Due to funding from earning the science status, certain areas of the school have been redeveloped. Major work was carried out over the summer of 2008, including the renovation of the three-storey Dartmouth Block to make it easily accessible for disabled students. An extension was added to the building during the academic year 2011–12 to house a new drama studio.

== Curriculum ==
Students in the school are placed in classes determined by their ability within the subject area. In Year 7, this is determined by Key Stage 2 SATS results. The sets are flexible and students are periodically moved in line with their progress.

At Key Stage 4, students can select subjects to study alongside the compulsory subjects of English, Mathematics, Science, ICT, PSHVE and Physical Education.

== Headteachers ==
Ifor David Trevor-Jones (1963–1977)

Trevor-Jones was the first headteacher at Richard Aldworth. Students on roll went from 210 to 1700 in his time as headteacher. He retired at the end of the 1977/78 autumn term.

Peter Sayer (1978–1989)

Sayer moved to Basingstoke from the Cotswolds in 1978 to take up the headship at Richard Aldworth. During his time there, the school grew to become the largest secondary school in Basingstoke.

Michael Ward (1990–2000)

Ward became the headteacher after moving from the headship of a smaller school in Southampton. During his time the community provision grew substantially and the school grew to just short of 1000 pupils. He retired at the end of the 1999–2000 academic year.

Julie Churcher (2000–2012)

Churcher retired at the end of the 2011–12 school year after 12 years of being headteacher at the Basingstoke school. During her time at the school, it gained Science College status and was granted funding from Hampshire County Council to build new facilities.

Denis McCabe (2012–2019)

McCabe became the headteacher of the college at the start of the 2012–13 academic year. He was formerly Deputy Headteacher at St Peter's Catholic Comprehensive School and St Katherine's Secondary School.

Paul Jenkins (2019–c. 2022)

Jenkins was appointed as temporary headteacher after McCabe left at the end of 2019. He also is the permanent headteacher of Court Moor School in Fleet.

Chris Rice (c. 2022 – 2024)

Rice's first academic year was 2022–23.

Jane Halsey (2024–present)

Halsey was appointed in June 2024 to take up the post of Headteacher as the school joined the South Farnham Educational Trust.

== Student leadership ==
Aldworth Science College has a third specialism as a 'Leadership Partner School'. Students are encouraged to take leadership roles and responsibilities such as Student Council Representative, Sports Captain, Department Assistants, Prefect and Senior Prefect, Head Boy/Girl and Peer Mentoring.

== Notable former pupils ==
- Sima Kotecha, journalist
- Robert Steadman, composer
