= Richard Aldworth (Reading MP) =

English Member of Parliament

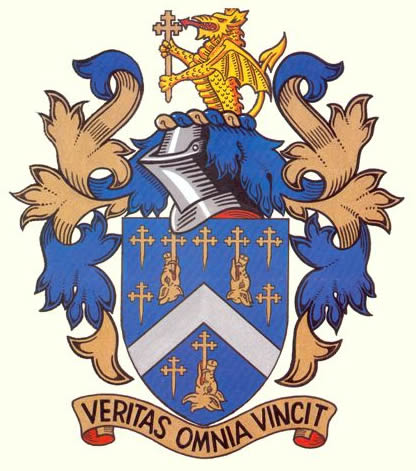
The crest of Reading Blue Coat School. The arms of the Aldworth family have an extra dagger in the empty space of the shield.

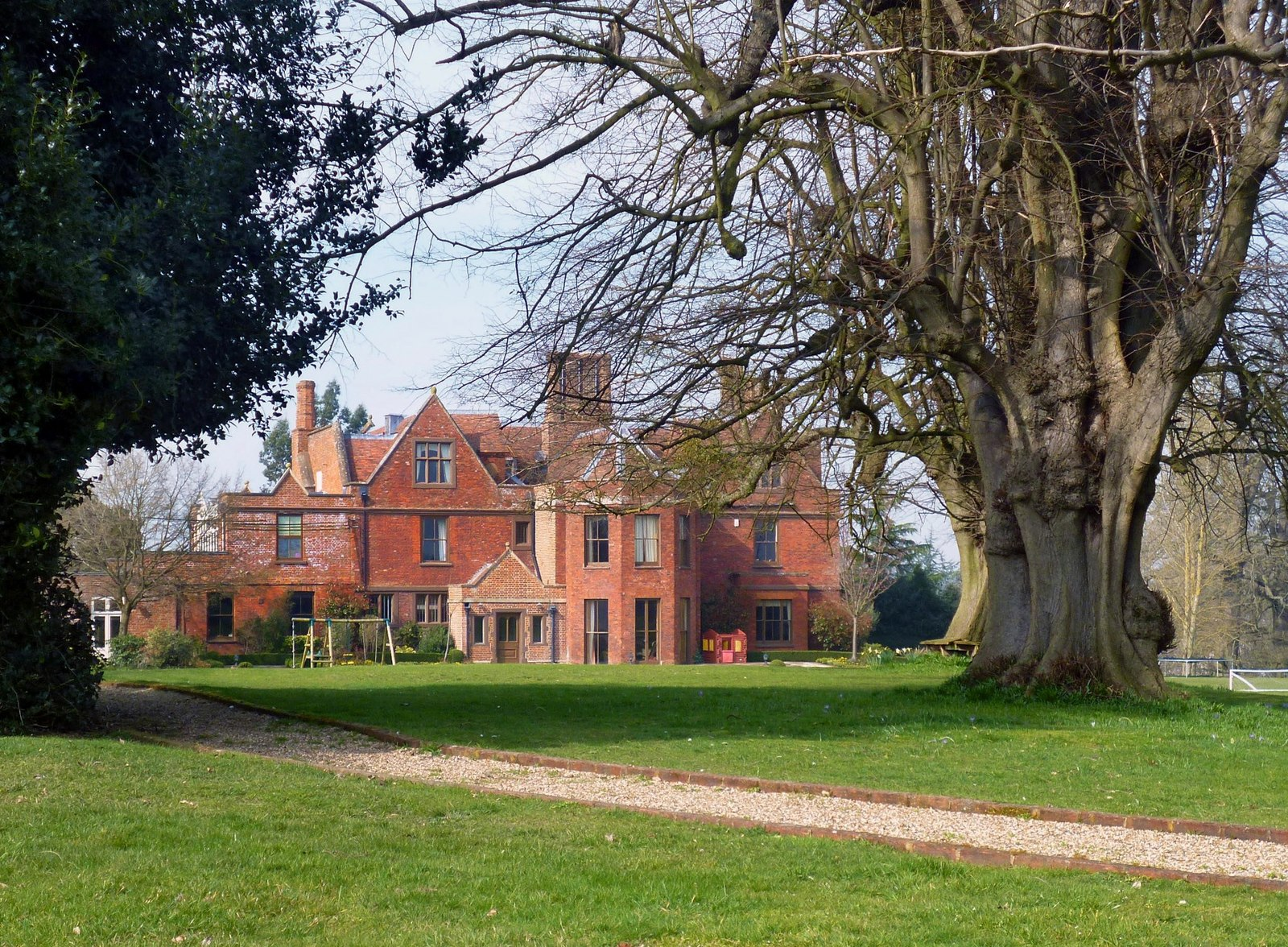
Stanlake Manor, Berkshire

Richard Aldworth (c. 1614 – 5 October 1680) of Stanlakes, Hurst St Nicholas, Berkshire, was an English politician who sat in the House of Commons from 1661 to 1679. He was also founder of the Blue Coat schools in Reading and Basingstoke, and fought in the Royalist army in the English Civil War.

Aldworth was the son of Richard Aldworth of Wargrave, Berkshire and his wife Amy Persons, daughter of Thomas Persons of Great Milton, Oxfordshire. He was a student at Middle Temple in 1637. He succeeded his father in 1638.

In the Civil War he became Royalist captain of horse in 1642. He was auditor of the army by 1643 and became a major in the Royalist army by 1644. He fought at the Second Battle of Newbury and at Bristol. he petitioned to compound on the Oxford articles and later escaped to the Netherlands. In 1650 he returned to England and compounded for £200.

After the Restoration Aldworth became J.P. for Berkshire in July 1660, Commissioner for assessment for Berkshire in August 1660, and Secretary to Archbishop William Juxon in September 1660. He was auditor of land revenues for Yorkshire, Northumberland and county Durham from 1661. In 1661 he was elected Member of Parliament for Reading in the Cavalier Parliament. He also became freeman of Canterbury and Reading. He became J.P. for Wiltshire in 1662 and was commissioner for loyal and indigent officers for Berkshire. In 1663 he became commissioner for assessment for Wiltshire and in 1665 for Westminster and also for Kent. In 1668 he became additional auditor of imprests. He was a Deputy Lieutenant after 1670. In 1672 he became chief auditor and sub-commissioner for prizes. He was commissioner for recusants in 1675. Aldworth lived at Stanlake Park at Ruscombe in Berkshire and, dying at the age of 66, was commemorated by a memorial in the parish church. Aldworth married Anne Gwynn, daughter of William Gwynn of Frogmore House, Windsor, Berkshire by 1646 and had six sons and six daughters.

The Richard Aldworth who was the Reading M.P. was not the man who founded the Reading and Basingstoke Blue Coat schools. A kinsman, also named Richard Aldworth (1576-1648), by his will dated 1646 founded both the Reading Blue Coat School for 24 boys, and the Basingstoke Blue Coat School for 8 boys, the boys to be dressed in blue coats (just like those of Christ's Hospital in Newgate, London, of which Aldworth was a governor). Richard Aldworth's mother, Jane South, came from Basingstoke. Richard Aldworth's charity survives as Aldworth's Educational Trust, granting small amounts to local young people in the Borough of Basingstoke and Deane. Richard Aldworth died in London on 5 March 1648 and was buried in St Mary Magdalene, Milk Street, which was destroyed in the Great Fire of London, 1666. This Richard Aldworth was apprenticed to The Skinners’ Company from a young age, living and dying in London.

Parliament of England
Preceded by Thomas Rich; John Blagrave	Member of Parliament for Reading; 1661–1679; With: Sir Thomas Dolman	Succeeded by Nathan Knight; John Blagrave
