= Aldworth Manor =

Historic house in New Hampshire, United States

- U.S. National Register of Historic Places
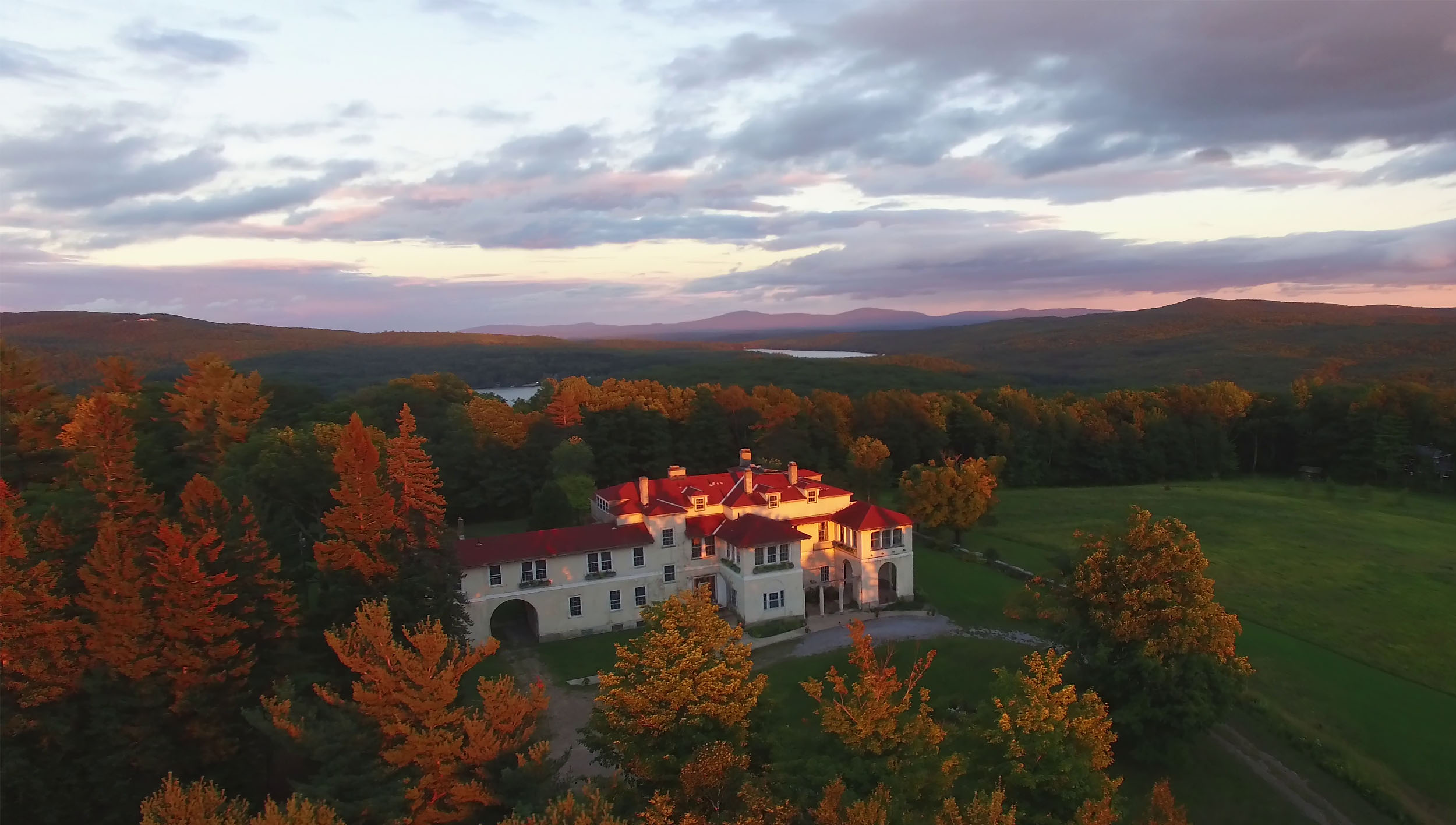
- Aerial view, 2015.

- Location within New Hampshire Location within the United States
- Location: Aldworth Road, on a hill above the north side of the Chesham-Harrisville Rd., Harrisville, New Hampshire
- Coordinates: 42°57′00″N 72°06′55″W
- Area: 4 acres (1.6 ha)
- Built: c.1850; 1905; 1915
- Architects: Fuller & Delano Company (1905); Kilham & Hopkins (1915)
- Architectural style: Late 19th And 20th Century Revivals, American Neo-Renaissance
- MPS: Harrisville MRA
- NRHP reference No.: 86003244
- Added to NRHP: January 14, 1988

Aldworth Manor, also known as the Arthur E. Childs House, is a historic summer estate house in rural Harrisville, New Hampshire. The house is located at the top of a hill at the end of Aldworth Road, formerly the estate's access drive, and was one of the premiere estate houses of the early 20th century in the town. The house was originally built c.1850 in Worcester, Massachusetts. It was inherited by Arthur E. Childs, a Worcester native from a wealthy family, in the early 20th century.

== Early history ==
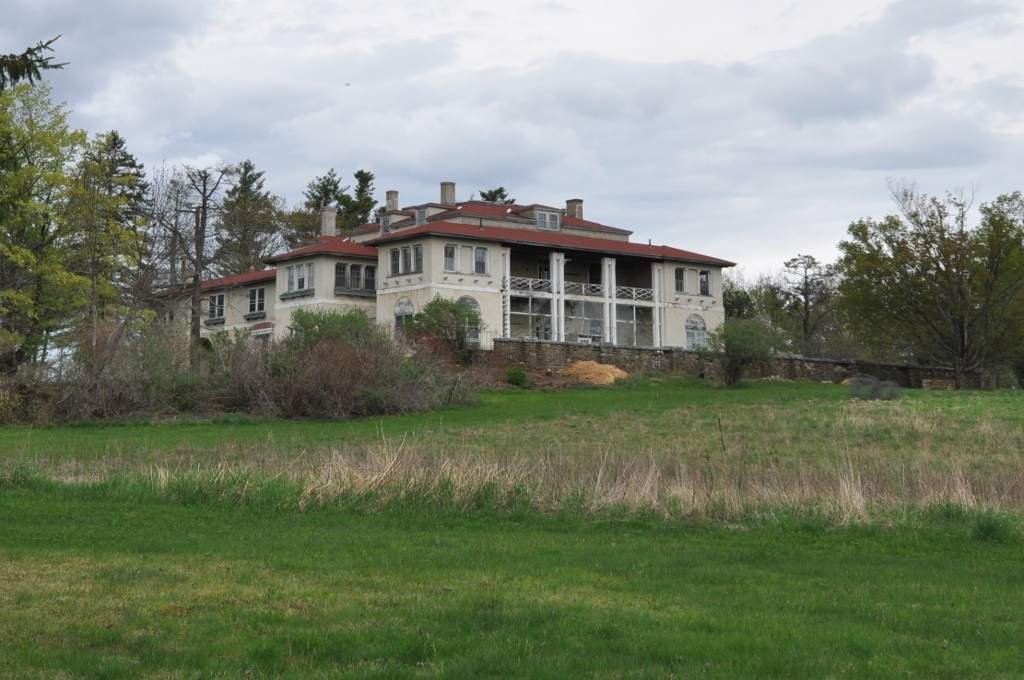
Another view of the main house, 2013.

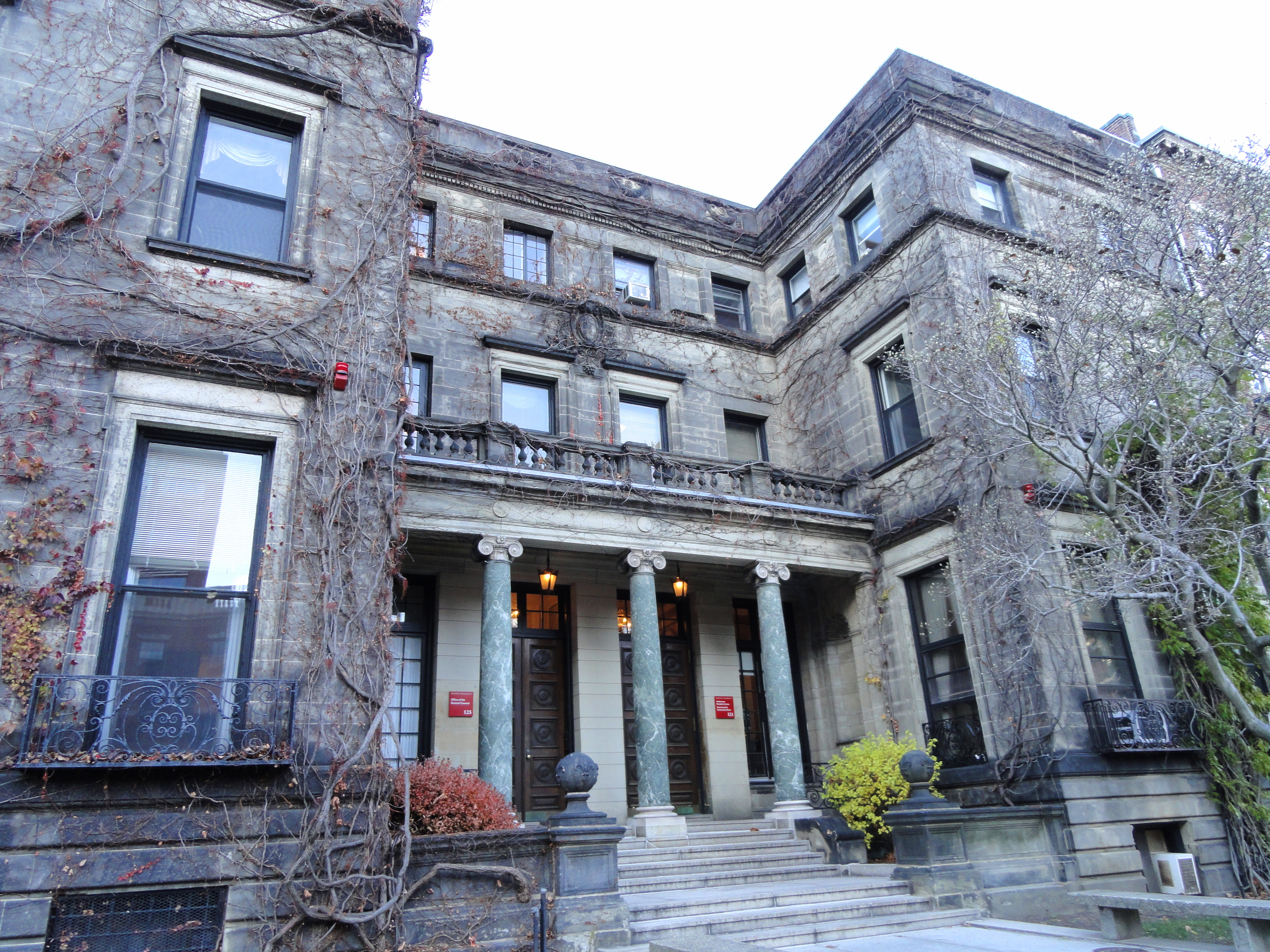
The houses of Arthur E. and Alice Childs and Sophie Moen in Boston, 2012.

The house that would become Aldworth Manor was originally built by the iron founder William W. Wheeler by 1851 on land in Worcester, Massachusetts that he had acquired in 1848. (Note: This property formed part of the estate owned successively by Thomas Hancock, John Hancock, Levi Lincoln Sr., Levi Lincoln Jr. and William Lincoln.) The house was first located at 104 (originally numbered 30) Lincoln Street, a few blocks from Lincoln Square. In 1867 the house was purchased by Philip L. Moen, president of the Washburn & Moen Manufacturing Company. Upon his death in 1891, the house was willed to Philip W. Moen, his eldest son. When he in turn died in 1904, it was willed to his sister, Alice, wife of Arthur E. Childs of Boston. (Note: Arthur E. and Alice Childs lived in a large townhouse at 121 Bay State Road. It was one of a pair built in 1899 by themselves and Alice Childs' sister, Sophie Moen, in 1899 to designs by Winslow, Wetherell & Bigelow.) This came with the stipulation that she must live in the house to receive the property. As residents of Boston, Mr. and Mrs. Childs apparently had no interest in living in Worcester, but they were in possession of a farm in Harrisville, New Hampshire on which Childs had proposed to build a hunting lodge. As Alice Childs had also been willed $1,000,000 along with the house, they decided to find a workaround that allowed them to keep the money but not have to reside in Worcester.

Beginning in 1905 the Childs had the house transported in pieces to Harrisville by train on seventeen railroad cars, and then hauled to what was then called Chesham Hill Farm, where it was reassembled and restyled in the Colonial Revival style. The architect for the relocation and initial remodeling was the Fuller & Delano Company of Worcester. This first phase of development was complete by 1908. In 1915 the Childs had the house renovated again, this time into a Renaissance villa. The architects this time were Kilham & Hopkins of Boston.

In addition to moving the house, Childs extensively landscaped the farm property, which was 500 acres (200 ha) at its greatest extent. The entry drive is flanked by rhododendrons Childs had imported, and built an elaborate terraced garden east of the house. Beyond the terraced garden is a reflecting pool and pergola supported by Tuscan columns. South of the pergola is a garden house with tile roof and brick flooring. A carriage house from 1915 stands to the northwest of the main house.

== Later history ==
The property has seen a variety of uses in the years since Childs owned it. The property has been reduced in size, and the main house has had mainly institutional owners. It has been used as a sanatorium, served as campus for several educational institutions, including Thomas More School, a boys' boarding school, in the 1960s, Antioch University New England, and as a missionary publishing house. These uses, necessitating alterations of the main house's interior, have to some extent compromised its integrity. The Mountain Missionary Society undertook some restorative work in the 1980s.

After being in danger of demolition, a new owner purchased the manor in 2014 and began restoring it in 2015. It now serves as a venue for weddings and other events.

A 4-acre (1.6 ha) parcel including the main house and a number of outbuildings was listed on the National Register of Historic Places in 1988.

== See also ==
- National Register of Historic Places listings in Cheshire County, New Hampshire
