= Calcot Park =

Country house and golf club in Berkshire, England

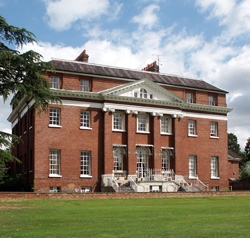
- The building in 2007

- Location within Reading, Berkshire
- Alternative names: Calcot Court

General information
- Type: Stately home
- Location: Calcot, Berkshire, England
- Coordinates: 51°26′41.11″N 1°1′56″W
- Construction started: 1759

Listed Building – Grade II*
- Official name: Calcot Court
- Designated: 25 October 1951
- Reference no.: 1215858

Calcot Park is a country house, estate, and golf club in the English county of Berkshire. It is situated between Calcot and Tilehurst, suburbs of the town of Reading, and within the civil parish of Tilehurst. It is north of the Bath Road (now part of the A4).

== History ==
Calcot Park was originally the manor house of Tilehurst manor, and the estate was significantly larger than at present. A fore-runner of the present house is thought to have been built by the merchant and moneylender, Sir Peter Vanlore (1547–1627). Later, it was the home of the famous "Berkshire Lady," Frances Kendrick, who married her husband, Benjamin Child, after challenging him to a duel. It is said that when, as a widower, Child sold up to John Blagrave, he changed his mind and the lead from the roof had to be removed to force him to leave. The resulting damage to the house forced Blagrave to build the present house in 1759. The house is a Grade II* listed building.

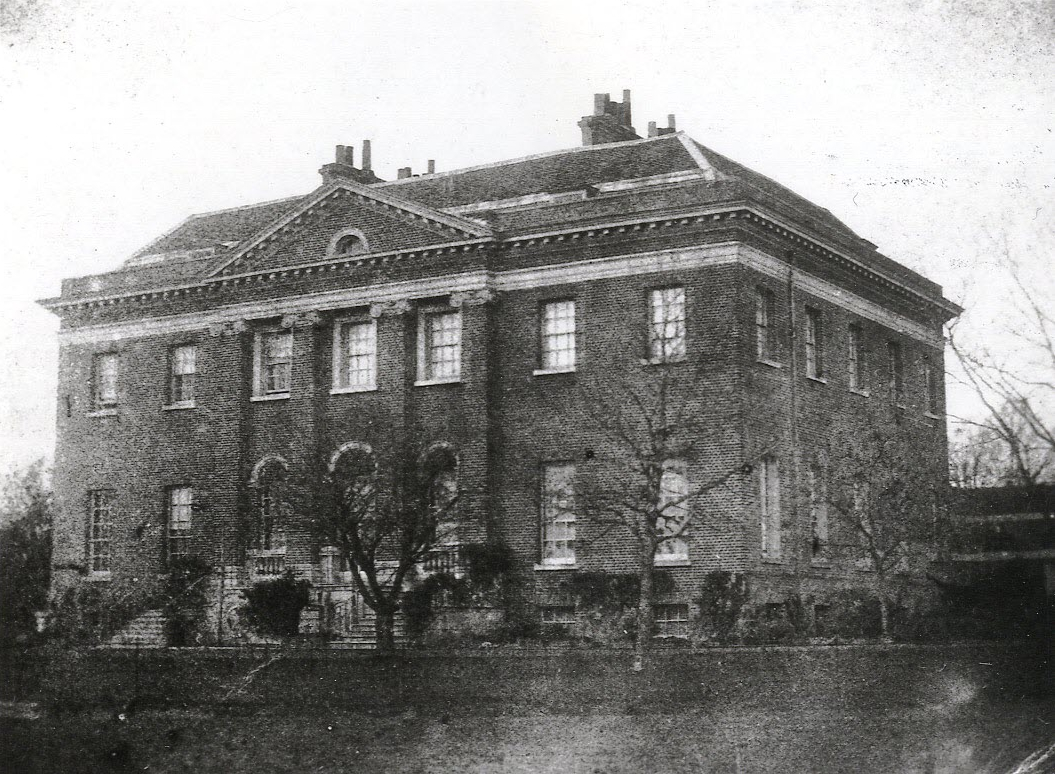
Calcot Park c. 1845 by William Fox Talbot

In fact, Child did not sell the whole of the Calcot Park estate, but retained the easternmost section, where the duel was said to have been held. Here he built himself a new mansion, the centre-piece of what is now Prospect Park.

The western part of the estate remained in the ownership of the Blagrave family for many years. The idea of a new golf course on this part of the estate was initially tested at a public meeting held in Reading on 24 April 1929. A favourable response resulted in a group of Reading businessmen meeting one week later to discuss the purchase of the estate and its conversion into a golf course. It was anticipated that a figure of £19,500 would be necessary to acquire the estate and another £5,000 to lay out the golf-course to the design of the famous golf-course architect Harry Colt. The main feature of this design is the picturesque lake spanned by the seventh hole.

Initially the house was used as the clubhouse for the new golf club. However, in 1960, it was sold and converted into apartments. The golf club had a new clubhouse built within the grounds with the proceeds of the sale.

== See also ==
- Grade II* listed buildings in Berkshire
- List of parks and open spaces in Reading, Berkshire
