= Vachell =

Vachell is a surname. Notable people with the surname include:

- Ada Vachell (1866–1923), English disabilities advocate
- Arthur H. Vachell (1864–1933), English watercolorist
- Charles Vachell, (c. 1783–1859), Welsh businessman and local politician
- Eleanor Vachell (1879–1948), Welsh botanist
- Horace Annesley Vachell (1861–1955), English writer
- Oliver Vachell, (c. 1518–1564), English politician
- Thomas Vachell (disambiguation)
- Tanfield Vachell (1602–1658), English member of parliament
