= Francis Knollys (admiral) =

English privateer and politician

Sir Francis Knollys (c. 1552 – 1648) of Reading Abbey, Berkshire was an English privateer and politician who sat in the House of Commons at various times between 1575 and 1648.

== Life ==
Knollys was the 6th son of Sir Francis Knollys, of Greys Court in Oxfordshire and Reading Abbey, Reading, in Berkshire, and his wife, Catherine Carey and was generally known as Francis Knollys the younger. He attended Magdalen College, Oxford in and around 1564. He was a student of Gray's Inn in 1565.

In December 1575 Knollys was elected Member of Parliament for Oxford following the death of Edward Knollys, and held the seat unit 1589. In those early years he was involved in piracy with Sir Francis Drake, serving as a rear-admiral on privateering activities in the Caribbean, returning in 1586 with considerable booty. He soon after served with his brother-in-law, the Earl of Leicester, in the Netherlands campaign and was knighted by him at Flushing on 7 December 1587.

Knollys was once again elected MP in 1597, this time for Berkshire. He was awarded MA at Oxford on 10 July 1598. In 1604 he was re-elected MP for Berkshire and sat until 1611. He was elected MP for Berkshire again in 1625. In April 1640, Knollys was re-elected MP for Reading in the Short Parliament with his son, and was re-elected for the Long Parliament in November 1640. He sat until his death in 1648.

Knollys died before May 1648 at the age of about 95, described by his colleagues as "the ancientest Parliament man in England". He was one of the oldest ever members of parliament and has the record for the longest span of service as an MP, 73 years between first being elected and his death. He was buried at St Laurence's Church, Reading. He had married in 1588 Lettice Barrett, daughter of John Barrett, of Hanham in Gloucestershire.

Knollys had three sons and six daughters, amongst them Robert, MP, who predeceased him in 1626, Francis, who predeceased him in 1643 Richard and Lettice, who married the parliamentarian, John Hampden.

== Ancestry ==
Ancestors of Francis Knollys (admiral)

Sir Richard Knollys
Robert Knollys
Margaret D'Oyley
Sir Robert Knollys
Sir John Troutbeck
Elizabeth Troutbeck
Margaret Hulse
Sir Francis Knollys
Sir Richard Penystone
Sir Thomas Penystone
Margaret Herris
Lettice Penystone
Richard Bulstrode
Alice Bulstrode
Alice Knyffe
Sir Francis Knollys
Sir William Carey
Sir Thomas Carey
Alice Furford
Sir William Carey
Sir Robert Spencer
Margaret Spencer
Eleanor Beaufort
Catherine Carey
William Boleyn
Thomas Boleyn, 1st Earl of Wiltshire
Lady Margaret Butler
Mary Boleyn
Thomas Howard, 2nd Duke of Norfolk
Lady Elizabeth Howard
Elizabeth Tilney

Parliament of England
Preceded by Edward Knollys; William Owen	Member of Parliament for Oxford; 1575–1589; With: William Owen 1575–1580; Edward Norreys 1580–1584; William Noble 1584–1586; George Calfield 1584–1589	Succeeded by Sir Edmund Carey; George Calfield
Preceded by Sir Henry Unton; Sir Humphrey Forster	Member of Parliament for Berkshire; 1597–1598; With: Sir Henry Norreys	Succeeded by Sir Richard Lovelace; George Hyde
Preceded by Sir Richard Lovelace; George Hyde	Member of Parliament for Berkshire; 1604–1614; With: Sir Henry Neville	Succeeded by Edmund Dunch; Sir Richard Harrison
Preceded by Edmund Dunch; Sir Richard Harrison	Member of Parliament for Berkshire; 1625; With: Edmund Dunch	Succeeded by Edmund Dunch; John Fettiplace
Vacant Parliament suspended since 1629	Member of Parliament for Reading; 1640–1648; With: Sir Francis Knollys jun. 1640–1643; Daniel Blagrave 1645–1648	Succeeded by Tanfield Vachell; Daniel Blagrave
