= 1913 Reading by-election =

UK parliamentary by-election

The 1913 Reading by-election was a Parliamentary by-election held on 8 November 1913. The constituency returned one Member of Parliament (MP) to the House of Commons of the United Kingdom, elected by the first past the post voting system.

== Vacancy ==
Sir Rufus Isaacs was appointed Lord Chief Justice of England and Wales created Baron Reading and given a seat in the House of Lords. He had been Liberal MP for Reading since 1903.

== Electoral history ==
Isaacs had won the last four parliamentary elections in Reading, but at the last General Election he only just managed to hold off the Conservative challenge;

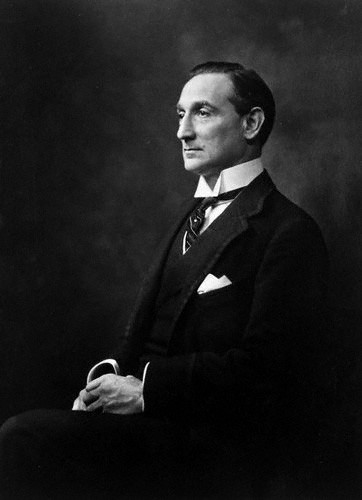
Sir Rufus Isaacs

General election December 1910 Electorate 11,016
Party	Candidate	Votes	%	±%
Liberal	Rufus Isaacs	5,094	50.5	−0.5
Conservative	Leslie Orme Wilson	4,995	49.5	+0.5
Majority		99	1.0	−1.0
Turnout		10,089	91.6	−2.1
Liberal hold		Swing	-0.5	

This made Reading one of the most marginal seats in the country.

== Candidates ==
The local Liberal Association were unable to find a local candidate, and after some difficulties, settled on the wealthy and radical outsider George Peabody Gooch to defend the seat. He was elected at the 1906 general election as Member of Parliament (MP) for Bath, but lost the seat at the January 1910 general election. He stood again in Bath at the December 1910 general election, but did not regain the seat, Gooch's candidacy provoked the threat of an anti-vaccinationist candidate from within the local party.

The local Unionists re-selected Leslie Orme Wilson. In January 1910, at the General Election, he unsuccessfully stood as the Conservative candidate for Poplar. In December 1910, he was Unionist candidate for Reading, but was defeated by the sitting Liberal candidate, Sir Isaac Rufus, the Attorney-General.

A third candidate entered the contest in the figure of J. G. Butler, who was a member of the British Socialist Party. Butler was from London and in March 1913 he had contested the 1913 London County Council election at Stepney, where he had polled poorly. He secured the backing of the Reading Trades Council and the Reading branch of the Independent Labour Party.

== Background ==
If the Unionists were to hope to win a majority at the next General Election expected to take place in 1914/15, they would need to win Reading as it was statistically No17 on their target list. The intervention of a Socialist candidate at the by-election, thus gave them a good opportunity to gain the seat and establish their candidate as the incumbent.

== Campaign ==
In the last week of the campaign, following on from an announcement made by Chancellor of the Exchequer, David Lloyd George, of a new rural land policy, the Liberal campaign circulated a leaflet proclaiming Vote for Gooch and the new Liberal land policy – the wage raising policy for Reading. It argued that higher agricultural wages would lead to higher wages in towns. It also argued that a revival in the rural economy would stop labourers migrating to towns and causing unemployment and that a more prosperous countryside would buy more of Reading's products.

== Result ==
Reading by-election, 8th November 1913 Electorate 11,088
Party	Candidate	Votes	%	±%
Unionist	Leslie Orme Wilson	5,144	50.3	+0.8
Liberal	George Peabody Gooch	4,013	39.3	−11.2
British Socialist Party	Joseph George Butler	1,063	10.4	New
Majority		1,131	11.0	N/A
Turnout		10,220	92.2	+0.6
Unionist gain from Liberal		Swing	+6.0	

Although the Unionists gained the seat, the fact that the Unionist share of the vote only increased by 0.8% indicated that they would struggle to hold the seat at a General Election when no Socialist would be standing.

== Aftermath ==
A General Election was due to take place by the end of 1915. By the summer of 1914, the following candidates had been adopted to contest that election. Due to the outbreak of war, the election never took place.

General Election 1914/15: Reading Electorate 11,016
Party	Candidate	Votes	%	±%
Unionist	Leslie Orme Wilson			
Liberal	Henry Norman Spalding			

General election 14 December 1918: Reading Electorate
Party	Candidate	Votes	%	±%
Unionist	Leslie Orme Wilson	15,204	53.9	+4.4
Labour	Thomas Charles Morris	8,410	29.8	New
Liberal	Frederick Thoresby	3,143	11.1	−39.4
NSP	Lorenzo Quelch	1,462	5.2	New
Majority		6,794	24.1	N/A
Turnout		28,219	62.2	−29.4
Unionist gain from Liberal		Swing	+21.9	

- Wilson was the endorsed candidate of the Coalition Government.
