= William Tho... =

14th-century English politician

William Tho... (fl. 1394) was an English politician.

This politician remains obscure, and even his full surname is unknown. His name does not match that of a burgess of Reading, Berkshire, so he has not been clearly identified.

He was a member (MP) of the parliament of England for Reading in 1394.

Parliament of England
Preceded by William Catour with David atte Hacche	Member of Parliament for Reading; 1394; With: William Saville	Succeeded by William Shortwade with John Ede
