= Henry Singer Keating =

British lawyer and politician

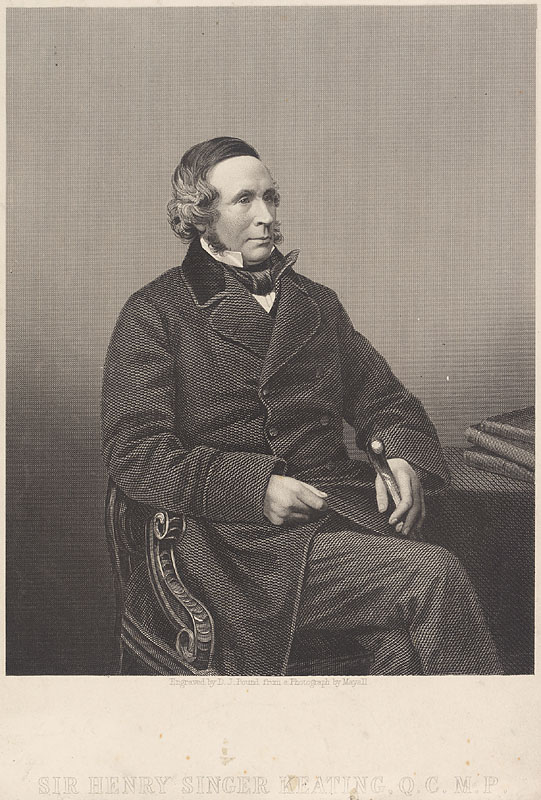
Sir Henry Singer Keating.

Sir Henry Singer Keating (13 January 1804 – 1 October 1888) was a British lawyer and politician.

The son of Lieutenant General Sir Henry Sheehy Keating, he attended Trinity College Dublin and became a barrister at the Inner Temple in 1832, and a Queen's Counsel in 1849. He was Member of Parliament for Reading from 1852 until 1860 and as Solicitor General for England and Wales from 1857 to 1858 and in 1859. He was knighted in 1857.

He sat as a Judge of Common Pleas from 1859 to 1875. He became a member of the Privy Council in 1875, entitling him to sit on the Judicial Committee of the Privy Council, the court of last resort for the Empire.

== Arms ==
Coat of arms of Henry Singer Keating

Crest
On a mural coronet Or a boar statant Gules in the mouth a laurel leaf Vert.
Escutcheon
Arms a saltire Gules between four laurel leaves Vert on a chief embattled Azure two French flags in saltire surmounted by a sword erect all Proper over the sword "Bourbon" in gold letters.

Parliament of the United Kingdom
Preceded by John Frederick Stanford; Francis Piggott	Member of Parliament for Reading; 1852 – 1860; With: Francis Piggott	Succeeded by Francis Goldsmid; Francis Piggott
Legal offices
Preceded by James Stuart-Wortley	Solicitor General for England and Wales; 1857 – 1858	Succeeded by Sir Hugh Cairns
Preceded by Sir Hugh Cairns	Solicitor General for England and Wales; 1859	Succeeded by Sir William Atherton
