= KYNG =

KYNG may refer to:

- Kyng (name)
- Kyng (band), a hard rock band formed in 2008 in Los Angeles
- KYNG (AM), a radio station (1590 AM) licensed to Springdale, Arkansas
- KRLD-FM, a radio station (105.3 FM) licensed to Dallas, Texas, United States, which used the call sign KYNG from March 1992 to March 2003
- the ICAO code for Youngstown–Warren Regional Airport
