= Stapfer =

Stapfer is a surname. Notable people with the surname include:

- Paul Stapfer (1840–1917), French writer
- Philipp Albert Stapfer (1766–1840), Swiss politician, diplomat, and philosopher who settled in France

== See also ==
- Stapper
