= Lybbe =

Lybbe is a surname. Notable people with the surname include:

- Richard Lybbe (1479–1527/28), English politician
- Philip Lybbe Powys Lybbe (1818–1897), English rower, barrister, and politician
