= Francis Pigott Stainsby Conant =

19th-century British politician and Member of Parliament

8th Lieutenant Governor of the Isle of Man
- In office 1860–1863
- Monarch: Victoria
- Preceded by: Mark Hildesley Quayle (acting)
- Succeeded by: Mark Hildesley Quayle (acting)

Personal details
- Born: 1809
- Died: 21 January 1863
- Spouse: Frances Phillips Wilder
- Relations: Eight children

Francis Pigott Stainsby Conant (1809 – 21 January 1863) was a British Whig politician who became the Lieutenant Governor of the Isle of Man from 22 October 1860 until his sudden death in 1863.

== Biography ==
Francis Pigott was born at Trunkwell House, Berkshire, in 1809, the eldest of seven sons (there were also five daughters) of Paynton Pigott Stainsby Conant (d. 1862), of Archer Lodge, Hampshire, and of Banbury, Oxfordshire (of which he was lay impropriator), and Lucy Maria, daughter of Richard Drope Gough, of Souldern, Oxfordshire. Paynton Pigott had adopted the additional names and arms of "Stainsby" and "Conant" by royal licence in 1836, as a condition of claiming inheritances according to the wills of individuals who were close to the Pigott family and had no descendants. These inheritances included 38 acres (150,000 m^{2}) of land in Limehouse and Poplar, London; the family's names are commemorated in property names in that area including Pigott Street, Stainsby Road and Conant House.

He was educated at Eton, and at Lincoln College, Oxford. In 1833 he married Frances Phillips Wilder, the second daughter of Lieutenant General Sir Francis John Connor Wilder, a former Member of Parliament for Arundel. They had eight children. Frances's younger sister Emma married Francis Pigott's brother, Rev. Richard Paynton Pigott, rector of Ellisfield, Hampshire.

== Career ==
=== Parliamentary member ===
Pigott was Member of Parliament (MP) for Reading for thirteen years having won the seat from the Conservatives at the 1847 general election, being re-elected three times before resigning his seat. In addition Pigott was a Magistrate and a Lieutenant in the Hampshire Yeomanry.

=== Lieutenant Governor of the Isle of Man ===
On 18 September 1860 Pigott received a letter from the Secretary of State for the Home Department, Sir George Cornewall Lewis, offering him the position of Lieutenant Governor of the Isle of Man which he duly accepted. As a requirement of his appointment he was obliged to resign his parliamentary seat. This was undertaken and Pigott was succeeded by Sir Francis Goldsmid.

Francis Pigott succeeded Charles Hope to the governorship of the Isle of Man, being formally appointed on 22 October 1860.

Following his appointment as Lieutenant Governor Francis Pigott arrived at Douglas, accompanied by his wife and eldest son, on board the steamer Tynwald on Saturday 10 November 1860. Upon disembarkation, Governor Pigott was greeted by various local dignitaries, and taken by carriage to his temporary residence at the Castle Mona.

The official Swearing-In Ceremony took place at Castle Rushen, performed by the Deputy Governor on Monday 12 November.

Governor Pigott's duties included presiding over the Isle of Man's Court of General Gaol as well as the Chancery Court. In December 1860 Governor Pigott became patron of the Isle of Man Agricultural Society.

In the spring of 1861 the Island's principal courts transferred from Castletown to Douglas making Governor Pigott the last Lieutenant Governor to preside over the principal courts in Castletown.

In the early 1860s various attempts were being made to source land around Castletown on which a new residence for the Island's Lieutenant Governor could be built. However a strong consensus favoured moving the Island's political home from Castletown to Douglas, and this was shared by Governor Pigott. Tynwald, the Manx Parliament, allowed Governor Pigott to select his own residence, and he chose the Villa Marina, the former estate of Colonel Robert Steuart and which had until recently been the venue of a seminary boarding school. A lease was negotiated on the premises for seven years, at a rent of £250 annually, with Governor Pigott taking residence in May 1861.

Foundation stones

During his governorship Francis Pigott performed various civic roles which included the laying of numerous foundation stones.

On 8 July 1861 Governor Pigott laid the foundation stone of Saint Olave's Church, Ramsey, an occasion which saw him presented with a silver trowel. Another foundation stone was laid on 25 September for a new Wesleyan day school in Peel. A further occasion saw Governor Pigott laying the foundation stone at the Wesleyan Methodist Chapel at Sandy Gate, Jurby.

== Death ==
Governor Pigott left the Isle of Man on 9 December 1862, in order to spend Christmas with his family. Suffering the effects of ill-health, he was advised by his physician not to undertake any public business and died at his home, Heckfield Lodge, Winchfield, Hampshire on 21 January 1863. The cause of death was given as an internal abscess.

The funeral of Francis Pigott took place in the village of Sherfield, Hampshire on Friday 31 January 1863.

== Sources ==
Bibliography

- A Genealogical and Heraldic History of The Landed Gentry; or, Commoners of Great Britain & Ireland. John Burke - 1838.

Parliament of the United Kingdom
Preceded by Charles Russell; Viscount Chelsea	Member of Parliament for Reading; 1847–1860; With: Thomas Noon Talfourd 1847–1849; John Frederick Stanford 1849–1852; Sir Henry Singer Keating 1852–1860; Sir Francis Goldsmid, Bt 1860	Succeeded by Sir Francis Goldsmid, Bt; Gillery Pigott
Government offices
Preceded by Mark Hildesley Quayle (acting)	Lieutenant Governor of the Isle of Man; 1860–1863	Succeeded by Mark Hildesley Quayle (acting)
