= William Derby (disambiguation) =

William Derby was an artist.

William Derby may also refer to:

- William Derby (fl. 1397), MP for Southwark
- William Derby (fl. 1404), MP for Reading

== See also ==
- William Bourne de Derby, MP
- William Darby (disambiguation)
