= 1910 Reading by-election =

UK parliamentary by-election

The 1910 Reading by-election was a parliamentary by-election held for the UK House of Commons constituency of Reading in Berkshire on 12 March 1910.

== Vacancy ==
The by-election was caused by the appointment of the sitting Liberal MP, Rufus Isaacs KC as Solicitor General for England and Wales. Under the Parliamentary rules applicable at the time if Isaacs wished to remain an MP he had to resign and fight a by-election.

== Candidates ==
The Reading Liberals re-selected Isaacs to try to retain his seat which he had held since winning it in a by-election on 6 August 1904. At the previous general election held in January 1910 he had retained the seat but with a majority of just 207 votes.

A meeting of Conservative leaders in the constituency met hurriedly on 7 March 1910 to consider their position. It was reported that there was a majority in favour of contesting the by-election, especially if their general election candidate Major A L Renton, could be persuaded to stand again. Renton had formerly been Liberal MP for Gainsborough but had defected to the Tories. Isaacs did his best to put pressure on Renton and the Unionists not to contest the election announcing that the borough of Reading should not have to be subjected to the disruption of trade that a by-election would produce. He later also suggested that the honour of his appointment was being bestowed not just upon him but upon the citizens of Reading as a whole. Members of the Reading Conservative Association met on 8 March to discuss the by-election and decided not to put up a candidate. The fact that there would very likely be another general election within a few months encouraged the Conservatives to save their fire and wait for that contest rather than fight an expensive by-election.

There was no tradition of Parliamentary elections in Reading being contested by the Labour Party and they also chose not to oppose Isaacs.

== The result ==
There being no other candidates putting themselves forward therefore, Isaacs was returned unopposed.

Reading by-election, 1910
Party	Candidate	Votes	%	±%
Liberal	Rufus Isaacs	Unopposed	N/A	N/A
Liberal hold				

== See also ==
- List of United Kingdom by-elections
- United Kingdom by-election records
