= 1878 Reading by-election =

UK Parliamentary by-election

The 1878 Reading by-election was fought on 17 May 1878. The by-election was fought due to the death of the incumbent Liberal MP, Sir Francis Goldsmid. It was won by the Liberal candidate George Palmer.
