= William Justice =

William Justice may refer to:

- William Wayne Justice (1920–2009), American jurist
- William J. Justice (born 1942), American Roman Catholic bishop
- William Justice (MP) (died 1521), English politician
- Richard Travis (actor), (1913-1989) American actor, born William Justice
- Bill Justice (1914–2011), animator and engineer

== See also ==
- Bill Justis (1926–1982), American rock and roll musician and composer
