= Stapper =

Stapper is a surname. Notable people with the name include:

- William Stapper, English politician
- Stephen Stapper, English politician
