= John Saunders (MP) =

English lawyer and politician

John Saunders (c. 1590 – 29 April 1638) was an English lawyer and politician who sat in the House of Commons between 1621 and 1629.

Saunders was the son of Thomas Saunders of Woolstone in Berkshire (now Oxfordshire) and his wife, Jane daughter of Thomas Cordery of Chute in Wiltshire. He matriculated at University College, Oxford on 22 May 1601 aged 11 and was awarded BA on 28 January 1608. He was called to the bar at Middle Temple in 1616 and became Recorder of Reading, Berkshire. In 1621, he was elected Member of Parliament for Reading. He was re-elected MP for Reading in 1624, 1625, 1626 and 1628 and sat until 1629 when King Charles decided to rule without parliament for eleven years.

Saunders died in 1638 at the age of about 48.

Saunders married Margaret Evelyn, daughter of John Evelyn of Godstone, Surrey. They had five daughters and one son, Thomas, who was later MP for Wallingford.

Parliament of England
Preceded by Francis Moore; Robert Knollys	Member of Parliament for Reading; 1621–1629; With: Anthony Barker 1621–1622; Francis Knollys 1624–1629	Parliament suspended until 1640
