= Robert atte Lee =

Member of the Parliament of England

Robert atte Lee (fl. 1379–1386), of Reading, Berkshire, was an English politician and brazier.

== Family ==
The poll tax information from 1379 shows him to have been married to a woman named Alice.

== Career ==
He was a member (MP) of the parliament of England for Reading in 1386.
