= Richard Smith (died 1516) =

English merchant, politician and courtier

Richard Smith (by 1453–1516) was an English politician and courtier.

Richard was a cloth merchant with premises in both the City of London and Reading in Berkshire. He obtained a number of minor royal appointments before becoming a Yeoman of the Robes to Queen Elizabeth of York in the late 1480s. He was also the Royal bailiff at Swallowfield Park and held the same position under Sir Francis Knollys at Caversham. He was elected a member (MP) of the parliament of England for Reading in 1497, 1504 and 1512.
