= Simon Porter (MP) =

15th-century English politician

Simon Porter also known as Simon Kent (fl. 1421–1451) of Reading, Berkshire, was an English Member of Parliament for Reading May 1421, 1422, 1425, 1432, 1433, 1435, 1437, 1447, February 1449, November 1449 and Mayor of Reading 1427–8, 1429–30, 1441–2 and 1450–1.
