= Alfred Howitt (politician) =

Sir Alfred Bakewell Howitt CVO (11 February 1879 – 8 December 1954) was an English medical doctor who became a Conservative Party politician.

== Early life and medical career ==
Howitt was born in Nottingham, the youngest son of Dr Francis Howitt, a doctor from an old Quaker family whose relatives included the anthropologist Alfred William Howitt. He was schooled at Epsom College and then graduated in natural sciences from Clare College, Cambridge, before training as a doctor at St Thomas' Hospital in London. After several years as a hospital doctor in London, he served during the First World War in France as a captain in the Royal Army Medical Corps, before returning to London in 1919 and practising as a physician in Berkeley Square.

== Political career ==
Howitt first stood for Parliament at the 1929 general election in Preston, where he failed to win either of the two seats. He was unsuccessful again at the Preston by-election in July 1929.

Howitt entered the House of Commons on his third attempt, when he was elected at the 1931 general election as Member of Parliament (MP) for Reading in Berkshire. He was re-elected in 1935 and held the seat until he stood down at the 1945 general election.

In Parliament, Howitt worked with doctors in other political parties, and was chairman of the Parliamentary Medical Committee in 1943.

== Honours ==
He was made a Commander of the Royal Victorian Order in the 1928 Birthday Honours, and knighted in the 1945 New Years Honours List, for political and public services.

Parliament of the United Kingdom
Preceded by Somerville Hastings	Member of Parliament for Reading; 1931–1945	Succeeded by Ian Mikardo
