= Thomas Vachell (died 1553) =

16th-century English politician

Thomas Vachell (by 1500 – 1553), of Coley, Berkshire was an English landowner and politician.

== Family ==
He was the eldest son of Thomas Vachell of Coley by his first wife Elizabeth, daughter and co-heiress of William Cockworthy of Yarnscombe, Devon and half-brother of Oliver. His family had been settled in Coley, a hamlet on the outskirts of Reading, Berkshire, since the 13th century. He was admitted to the Middle Temple in 1518. By 1521 he had married Agnes, daughter of William Justice (MP), a former mayor of Reading.

== Career ==
Despite his comparative youth and not being a burgess, he was elected to represent Reading in 1529. He was to sit for Reading for all succeeding parliaments in Henry VIII's reign (with the possible exception of 1539, for which no return survives). He was active local administration and closely associated with Thomas Cromwell, being made his deputy as high steward of Reading. In 1540 he was appointed as overseer of the lands formerly belonging to Reading Abbey and Leominster priory and bailiff of Reading. Although described as a 'zealous Protestant', his comparative obscurity during Edward VI's reign suggests a more conservative religious outlook. It was probably him (rather than his son Thomas) who was elected to parliament for Reading once more in October 1553, as he died in London days after the parliament ended that December.

== Children ==
He and his wife Agnes (d. 1544?) he had a number of children, including:

- Thomas Vachell (1537–1610)
- Walter married Elizabeth, daughter of Sir Robert Lee of Quarrendon, Buckinghamshire and widow of William Tresham
- Francis married Ann, daughter of Robert Tanfield of Gayton, Northamptonshire
- John married Maria, daughter of Clement Vincent of Peckleton, Leicestershire
- Elizabeth married to Robert Watman, a London haberdasher
- Bridget married Richard Rowlte of Reading
- Margaret married Richard Erley of Mygham, Berkshire
