= Henry Barbour (MP for Reading) =

14th-century English politician

Henry Barbour (fl. 1384–1391), of Reading, Berkshire, was an English politician.

He was a member (MP) of the parliament of England for Reading in November 1384 and 1391.
