= John Balet =

English politician

John Balet (fl. 1380s), of Reading, Berkshire, was an English politician and brewer. He was a member (MP) of the parliament of England for Reading in April 1384 and September 1388.
