= Charles Townshend Murdoch =

Murdoch in 1895.

Charles Townshend Murdoch (27 May 1837 – 8 July 1898) was a banker and Conservative politician who sat in the House of Commons between 1885 and 1898.

Murdoch was the son of James Gordon Murdoch, of Ashfold, Sussex and his wife Caroline Penelope Gambier daughter of Samuel Gambier and sister of Edward John Gambier. He was educated at Eton College and became a lieutenant in the Rifle Brigade. Later he was a captain in the South Middlesex Volunteers and adjutant of the Hertfordshire Yeoman Cavalry. He became a banker and was a partner in the firm of Ransom, Bouverie & Co and a director of Imperial Fire Insurance Co and London Life Association. He was also chairman of the Llanelly Railway and a J.P. for Berkshire living at Wokingham.

At the 1885 general election, Murdoch was elected as the Member of Parliament (MP) for Reading, holding the seat until his defeat in 1892. He regained the seat in 1895, and held it until his death aged 61 in 1898. His opponents in the elections were members of the Palmer family of Huntley & Palmers biscuits.

Murdoch married Sophia Speke, daughter of W Speke of Ilminster, in 1862 and had several daughters and one son Charles Edward Gambier (1865-1894) who died of typhus unmarried.

Parliament of the United Kingdom
Preceded by George Shaw-Lefevre; George Palmer	Member of Parliament for Reading; 1885–1892	Succeeded by George William Palmer
Preceded by George William Palmer	Member of Parliament for Reading; 1895–1898	Succeeded by George William Palmer
