= Kyng (name) =

Kyng may refer to the following notable people:

Given name

- Kyng Rhodes, American painter, graphic designer and muralist

Surname

- Morten Kyng (born 1950), Danish computer science researcher
- William Kyng, 15th century English politician
