= William Darby =

William Darby may refer to:

- William Darby (priest) (died 1791), Anglican archdeacon in Ireland
- William J. Darby (1913–2001), American physician and nutrition scientist
- William Orlando Darby, US Army officer
  - USAT General William O. Darby, a ship named for the officer
- Pablo Fanque (born William Darby), British equestrian performer and circus proprietor

== See also ==
- William Derby (disambiguation)
