= Thomas Lavyngton =

English politician

Thomas Lavyngton (fl. 1416–1453) was an English politician. He sat as MP for Reading in March 1416, 1417, 1420, May 1421, 1422, 1423, 1425, 1427, 1429, 1431, 1435, and 1442.

He also served as justice of the peace for Berkshire from 13 November 1448 till June 1449, and 22 March 1452 till January 1454; commissioner of oyer an terminer in Oxfordshire, and Berkshire in January 1450; commissioner to impound goods of the Bishop of Salisbury in July 1450; and tax collector of Berkshire in August 1450. He also possibly served as Mayor of Reading from Michaelmas 1421 till 1422, and 1426 till 1427.

Before 1426, he married Denise.
