= Francis Knollys (MP, died 1643) =

English politician

- Born: 1592
- Died: 1643 (aged 50–51)

Sir Francis Knollys (1592–1643) was an English politician who sat in the House of Commons variously between 1624 and 1643.

Knollys was the son of Sir Francis Knollys of Battle Manor at Reading in Berkshire and his wife, Lettice, daughter of John Barrett of Hanham in Gloucestershire. He matriculated at Queen's College, Oxford in 1604 aged 12. He was awarded BA on 23 January 1607, and was a student of Middle Temple in 1610.

In 1624 Knollys was elected Member of Parliament for Reading and was re-elected in 1625, 1626 and 1628. He sat until 1629 when King Charles decided to rule without parliament.

In April 1640, Knollys was re-elected MP for Reading in the Short Parliament with his father. He was re-elected for the Long Parliament in November 1640 and sat until his death in 1643.

Knollys was Deputy Lieutenant of Berkshire. He married twice and had three sons and two daughters by his first wife. He predeceased his father, dying at the age of 51, and was buried in the family vault in St Laurence's Church, Reading on 17 May 1643.

Parliament of England
Preceded by Anthony Barker; John Saunders	Member of Parliament for Reading; 1624–1629; With: John Saunders	Parliament suspended until 1640
Vacant Parliament suspended since 1629	Member of Parliament for Reading; 1640–1643; With: Sir Francis Knollys sen.	Succeeded by Sir Francis Knollys sen. Tanfield Vachell
