= 1904 Reading by-election =

United Kingdom parliamentary election

← 1900	6 August 1904	1906 →

Candidate	Isaacs	Keyser
Party	Liberal	Conservative
Popular vote	4,770	4,540
Percentage	51.2%	48.8%
MP before election
George Palmer
Liberal
Subsequent MP
Rufus Isaacs
Liberal

The 1904 Reading by-election was a Parliamentary by-election held on 6 August 1904. The constituency returned one Member of Parliament (MP) to the House of Commons of the United Kingdom, elected by the first past the post voting system.

== Vacancy ==
George Palmer had been Liberal MP for the seat of Reading since the 1898 Reading by-election. He resigned from Parliament in 1904, due to advancing deafness.

== Electoral history ==
Since the Reading constituency was created in 1885 it had been closely contested between Liberal and Conservative; The Conservatives winning in 1885, 1886 and 1895 and the Liberals in 1892, 1898 and 1900. The Liberal victor on each occasion was Palmer, who was a very well known biscuit manufacturer in the town. At the last election he had won narrowly;

General Election 1900: Reading
Party	Candidate	Votes	%	±%
Liberal	George William Palmer	4,592	51.3	−1.1
Conservative	Charles Edward Keyser	4,353	48.7	+4.2
Majority		239	2.6	−5.3
Turnout		8,945	88.1	−3.6
Liberal hold		Swing	-2.6	

== Candidates ==
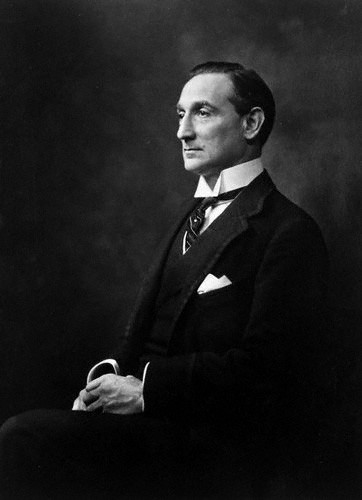
Isaacs (Lib)

- The local Liberal Association selected 44 year-old Rufus Isaacs as their candidate to hold the seat. Isaacs was a London barrister who had been made a QC in 1898. He was standing as a candidate for the first time. In such a marginal seat, the Liberals were taking a risk by choosing an outsider to replace a well-known local man.

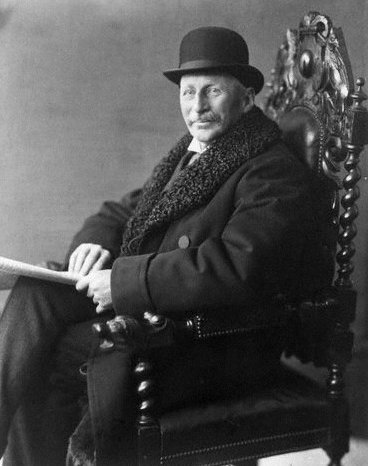
Keyser (Con)

- The local Conservative Association selected 57 year-old stockbroker Charles Keyser as their candidate. He was contesting Reading for the third time, having lost to Palmer in 1898 and 1900.
- There was some expectation of a socialist candidate making it a three-way contest, as had been the case in the 1898 by-election.

== Campaign ==
Polling day was fixed for the 6 August 1904.

== Result ==
The Liberals held the seat with an almost identical result to the previous election;

Reading by-election, 1904
Party	Candidate	Votes	%	±%
Liberal	Rufus Daniel Isaacs	4,770	51.2	−0.1
Conservative	Charles Edward Keyser	4,540	48.8	+0.1
Majority		230	2.4	−0.2
Turnout		9,310	83.5	−4.6
Liberal hold		Swing	-0.1	

== Aftermath ==
Keyser did not stand for parliament again. At the following General Election, Isaacs was re-elected;

General Election 1906: Reading
Party	Candidate	Votes	%	±%
Liberal	Rufus Daniel Isaacs	5,407	53.4	+2.2
Conservative	George Horace Johnstone	4,710	46.6	−2.2
Majority		697	6.8	+4.4
Turnout		10,117	91.6	+8.1
Liberal hold		Swing	+2.2	
