= Somerville Hastings =

British surgeon and Labour Party politician (1878–1967)

Somerville Hastings, FRCS (4 March 1878 – 7 July 1967) was a British surgeon and Labour Party politician.

== Early life and career ==
The son of the Reverend H G Hastings, he was born in Warminster, Wiltshire. He was educated at Wycliffe College (Gloucestershire), University College London (receiving the gold and silver medals for botany) and the Middlesex Hospital, London. He qualified as MRCS LRCP in 1902, FRCS in 1904 and MB (London) in 1908.

On 19 October 1911 Hastings married Bessie Tuke (1882–1958), the daughter of the architect William Tuke. They had two children.

== Working life ==
Hastings was Member of Parliament (MP) for Reading, in Berkshire, from 1923 to 1924, and from 1929 to 1931. He returned to the House of Commons at the 1945 general election as MP for Barking, holding the seat until his retirement at the 1959 general election.

Thora Silverthorne worked for Hastings as a nanny and went on to be secretary of the Socialist Medical Association.

Hastings was founder President of the Socialist Medical Association (SMA) 1930–51. He served in the Royal Army Medical Corps during the First World War, followed by work as an aural surgeon at the Middlesex Hospital. He was a Member of the London County Council (LCC) for fourteen years. Edith Summerskill felt that the "idea of a National Health Service germinated in the hospitable atmosphere" of Hastings’ home. He successfully proposed a resolution at the 1934 Labour Party Conference that the party should be committed to the establishment of a State Health Service. He was a member of the Party's Medical Services sub-committee which produced the report A State Health Service which was accepted as the basis for the Party's policy. He represented the LCC on the Nurses Salaries Committee which published two reports in 1943

== Death ==
Somerville Hastings died at the Royal Berkshire Hospital, Reading, on 7 July 1967, aged 89.

== Publications ==
Hastings was the author of:

- Toadstools at Home (1906)
- Wild Flowers at Home (1906)
- Alpine Plants At Home (1908)
- Summer Flowers Of The High Alps (1910)
- First Aid for the Trenches (1917)
- The Future of Medical Practice in England The Lancet (1928)
- Fabian Tracts no. 241 A National Physiological Minimum (January 1934)
- The Future of Medical Practice: A Personal View (1942)
- The Development of the Health Services (February 1943) (and many other leaflets and tracts for the Socialist Medical Association)
- The Family And The Social Services with Peggy Jay (February 1965)

Parliament of the United Kingdom
Preceded by Edward Cadogan	Member of Parliament for Reading; 1923–1924	Succeeded by Herbert Williams
Preceded by Herbert Williams	Member of Parliament for Reading; 1929–1931	Succeeded by Alfred Howitt
New constituency	Member of Parliament for Barking; 1945–1959	Succeeded by Tom Driberg
Civic offices
Preceded by Richard Coppock	Chairman of the London County Council; 1944–1945	Succeeded by Charles Robertson
