= Reading (constituency) =

Parliamentary constituency in the United Kingdom 1801-1950 and 1955-1974

- Former borough constituency for the House of Commons
- County: Berkshire

1295–1950
- Seats: Two until 1885, then one until 1950
- Replaced by: Reading North and Reading South

1955–1974
- Seats: One
- Type of constituency: Borough constituency
- Created from: Reading North and Reading South
- Replaced by: Reading North and Reading South

Reading was a parliamentary borough, and later a borough constituency in England, represented in the House of Commons of the Parliament of England until 1707, the Parliament of Great Britain from 1707 to 1800, and of the Parliament of the United Kingdom from 1801 to 1950 and 1955 to 1974. Until 1885, the constituency comprised the town of Reading in the county of Berkshire; after 1885, it was centred on the town but the exact boundaries differed.

From 1295, as a parliamentary borough, Reading elected two members of parliament (MPs). Under the Redistribution of Seats Act 1885, this representation was reduced to a single MP.

== History ==
Reading was one of the boroughs summoned to send members to the Model Parliament. The boundaries (encompassing the whole of one parish and parts of two others) were effectively unchanged from 1295 to 1918. In 1831, the population of the borough was 15,935, and contained 3,307 houses.

The right to vote was exercised by all inhabitants paying scot and lot, a relatively wide franchise for the period, and almost 2,000 votes were cast at the general election of 1826. Despite this high electorate, the corporation of the town was generally considered in practice to control elections to a large extent. In the second half of the 18th century, Reading was notoriously one of the most corrupt constituencies in England, bribery being both routine and expensive: Namier quotes the accounts kept for Prime Minister Newcastle of the 1754 election, which note that John Dodd, the government's candidate there, had already received £1000 and was promised £500 or £600 more to help him win the seat. (Dodd lost by one vote, but had the result overturned on petition by a partisan vote in the House of Commons, and Newcastle's accounts show a continuing trickle of funds to him to nurse the constituency over the next few years.) A few years later, the nomination to one of Reading's seats was advertised for sale in a London newspaper, though Reading was not mentioned by name and no price was specified; the newspaper's printers were charged by the Commons with a breach of privilege, but the sale of seats remained legal if frowned-upon until 1809.

The Great Reform Act left Reading's representation and boundaries unchanged, and the reformed franchise far from increasing its electorate seems to have reduced it: it was estimated that there were 1,250 voters in 1831, but only 1,001 were registered for the first post-Reform election, that of 1832.

Context of 1923. Larger as town had grown, one of Labour's 191 of 615 seats: a supply and confidence government lasted for 10 months with Liberal support. 1929 was similar but better for Labour.
Context of 1906. The Liberal Landslide victory.

The Redistribution of Seats Act 1885, coming into effect at the 1885 general election, reduced the representation of the parliamentary borough to a single MP. The single-member Reading constituency continued to exist until it was split in 1950 into the separate constituencies of Reading North and Reading South. These two constituencies were merged back into a single Reading constituency in 1955, but again split apart in 1974; despite its name, the 1955 constituency did not contain the whole of the County Borough of Reading, with one ward being included in both of the Newbury and Wokingham seats.

After 1885, the constituency was marginal, regularly changing hands between the Conservative Party and the Liberal Party up to 1918, then between the Conservatives and Labour.

Today the area formerly covered by the Reading constituency is within the constituencies of Reading Central, Reading West and Mid Berkshire, and Earley and Woodley.

== Boundaries and boundary changes ==
=== 1885–1918 ===
- The existing Parliamentary borough; and
- The area between the boundary of the Parliamentary borough and a boundary line drawn from the point at which the Reading and Reigate Railway crossed the boundary of the Parliamentary borough at the River Kennet, eastward along the Railway until it crossed Culver Lane, then westward along the centre of Culver Lane as far as the centre of Wokingham Road, then southward along the centre of Wokingham Road as far as the centre of Crescent Road, then westward along the centre of Crescent Road as far as the centre of Eastern Avenue, then southward along the centre of Eastern Avenue as far as the centre of Upper Redlands Road, then westward along the centre of Upper Redlands Road as far as the centre of Alexandra Road, then south and west along the centre of Junction Road to the centre of Christchurch Road, then along the centre of Christchurch Road until the line reached the boundary of the existing Parliamentary borough.

Minor expansion - see map on Vision of Britain website.

=== 1918–1950 ===
- The County Borough of Reading.

Boundaries extended to the south and west (gained from the Newbury and Wokingham Divisions), and to the north of the River Thames with the annexation of the Urban District of Caversham (part of the Henley Division of Oxfordshire) by Reading County Borough.

For the 1950 general election, Reading was abolished as a single-member Parliamentary borough and split between the two new borough constituencies of Reading North and Reading South.

=== 1955–1974 ===
For the 1955 general election, Reading was re-established, replacing Reading North and Reading South and comprising:

- The County Borough of Reading wards of Abbey, Battle, Castle, Caversham East, Caversham West, Church, Katesgrove, Minster, Redlands, Victoria, West.

The East and Tilehurst wards were included in the Wokingham and Newbury constituencies respectively.

From the 1964 general election, a revision to the County Borough wards resulted in minor changes. The constituency now comprised:

- The County Borough of Reading wards of Abbey, Battle, Castle, Caversham, Christchurch, Katesgrove, Minster, Redlands, Thames, and Whitley.

The constituency was abolished once again for the 1974 general election. The Christchurch, Redlands and Whitley wards were included in the re-established constituency of Reading South, with remaining wards being included in Reading North.

== Members of Parliament ==
=== 1295–1640 ===
- Constituency created 1295

Parliament	First member	Second member
1369	William Catour	
1371	William Catour	
1378	David atte Hacche	
1385	John Doublet	
1386	William Stapper	Robert atte Lee
1388 (Feb)	David atte Hacche	Richard Bedull
1388 (Sep)	John Balet	Nicholas Vachell
1390 (Jan)	John Kent	Robert Capellade
1390 (Nov)		
1391	Henry Barbour	John Doublet
1393	William Catour	David atte Hacche
1394	William Saville	William Tho...
1395	William Shortwade	John Ede
1397 (Jan)	John White	Richard Pernecote
1397 (Sep)	Thomas Selham	Robert Godewyn
1399	Roger Hay	John Hunt
1401		
1402		
1404 (Jan)	John Kent	William Derby
1404 (Oct)		
1406	John Hunt	Philip Richard
1407	John Merehan	William Kenelme
1410	John White	Alexander Colshull
1411		
1413 (Feb)		
1413 (May)	William Wilton	Richard Farle
1414 (Apr)	John Hastyng	John Clerk
1414 (Nov)	Stephen Stapper	John Pernecote
1415		
1416 (Mar)	Walter Mustard	Thomas Lavyngton 1
1416 (Oct)		
1417	Alexander Colshull	Thomas Lavyngton
1419	Robert Morys	Richard Cross
1420	Thomas Lavyngton	John Veyr
1421 (May)	Thomas Lavyngton	Simon Porter alias Kent
1421 (Dec)	John Hunt	William Kyng
1422	Simon Porter alias Kent	
1425	Simon Porter alias Kent	
1432	Simon Porter alias Kent	
1433	Simon Porter alias Kent	
1435	Simon Porter alias Kent	
1437	Simon Porter alias Kent	
1447	Simon Porter alias Kent	
1449 (Feb)	Simon Porter alias Kent	
1449 (Nov)	Simon Porter alias Kent	
1510	Richard Cleche	William Justice
1512	William Gifford	Richard Smith
1515	Edmund Knightley	John Pownsar
1523	Nicholas Hyde	William Edmonds
1529	Thomas Vachell I	John Raymond
1536	Thomas Vachell I	John Raymond
1539	?Thomas Vachell I	?John Raymond
1542	Thomas Vachell I	Richard Justice
1545	Thomas Vachell I	Roger Amyce
1547	William Grey, died May 1551 repl. 1552 by Sir John Mason	John Marshe
1553 (Mar)	John Bourne	John Winchcombe
1553 (Oct)	Thomas Vachell I	John Bell
1554 (Apr)	Robert Bowyer III	John Lovelace
1554 (Nov)	John Bourne	Edmund Plowden
1555	Thomas Vachell II	John Bell
1558	Thomas Aldworth	John Bell
1558–9	Thomas Aldworth	Thomas Turner
1562–3	Henry Knollys	Robert Rowbotham
1571	Henry Knollys	John Hastings
1572	Robert Knollys	Francis Alford
1584	Robert Knollys	Robert Harris
1586	Robert Knollys	Robert Harris
1588	Robert Knollys, sat for Breconshire, repl. Feb 1589 by Thomas Egerton	Robert Harris
1593	Humphrey Donatt	Charles Wednester
1597	Sir Humphrey Forster	Francis Moore
1601	Francis Moore	Anthony Blagrave
1604	Francis Moore	Jerome Bowes
1614	Francis Moore	Robert Knollys
1621–1622	Anthony Barker	John Saunders
1624	Francis Knollys III	John Saunders
1625	Francis Knollys III	John Saunders
1626	Francis Knollys III	John Saunders
1628	Francis Knollys III	John Saunders
1629–1640	No Parliaments summoned	

=== 1640–1885 ===
Year	First member	First party	Second member	Second party
April 1640	Francis Knollys III		Adm. Francis Knollys	
November 1640	Francis Knollys III (died 1643)		Adm. Francis Knollys (died 1648)	
1645	Daniel Blagrave			
1648	Tanfield Vachell			
1653	Not represented in Barebones Parliament			
1654	Robert Hammond			
1656	Daniel Blagrave			
1659	Henry Neville		Daniel Blagrave	
1660	Thomas Rich		John Blagrave	
1661	Sir Thomas Dolman		Richard Aldworth	
1679	Nathan Knight		John Blagrave	
March 1685	Thomas Coates		John Breedon	
November 1685	Thomas Coates		William Aldworth	
1689	Sir Henry Fane	Whig	Sir William Rich	
1698	Sir Owen Buckingham		John Dalby	
January 1701	Sir Owen Buckingham		Francis Knollys	
November 1701	Anthony Blagrave		Tanfield Vachell	
1702	Sir Owen Buckingham		Tanfield Vachell	
1705	Sir Owen Buckingham		Sir William Rich	
1708	Owen Buckingham		Anthony Blagrave	
1710	Owen Buckingham		John Dalby	
1713	Robert Clarges		Felix Calvert	
1716	Charles Cadogan		Owen Buckingham	
1720	Charles Cadogan		Richard Thompson	Whig
1722	Anthony Blagrave		Clement Kent	
1727	Richard Potenger		Richard Thompson	Whig
1734	Richard Potenger		Henry Grey	Whig
1739	John Blagrave		Henry Grey	Whig
1740	John Blagrave		William Strode	
February 1741	John Blagrave		John Dodd	Whig
May 1741	John Blagrave		William Strode	
1747	John Conyers		Richard Neville Aldworth Neville	
1754	William Strode		Charles Fane	Opposition Whig
1755	John Dodd	Whig	Charles Fane	Opposition Whig
1761	John Dodd	Whig	Sir Francis Knollys	
1768	John Dodd	Whig	Henry Vansittart	
1774	John Dodd	Whig	Francis Annesley	Tory
1782	Richard Aldworth-Neville	Whig	Francis Annesley	Tory
1797	John Simeon	Tory	Francis Annesley	Tory
1802	Charles Shaw-Lefevre	Whig	Francis Annesley	Tory
1806	Charles Shaw-Lefevre	Whig	John Simeon	Tory
1818	Charles Shaw-Lefevre	Whig	Charles Fyshe Palmer	Whig
1820	John Monck	Whig	Charles Fyshe Palmer	Whig
1826	John Monck	Whig	George Spence	Tory
1827	John Monck	Whig	Charles Fyshe Palmer	Whig
1830	Charles Russell	Tory	Charles Fyshe Palmer	Whig
1834	Charles Russell	Conservative	Charles Fyshe Palmer	Whig
1835	Charles Russell	Conservative	Thomas Talfourd	Radical
1837	Charles Fyshe Palmer	Whig	Thomas Talfourd	Radical
1841	Charles Russell	Conservative	Henry Cadogan	Conservative
1847	Francis Pigott	Whig	Thomas Talfourd	Radical
1849	Francis Pigott	Whig	John Frederick Stanford	Conservative
1852	Francis Pigott	Whig	Sir Henry Singer Keating	Whig
1859	Francis Pigott	Liberal	Sir Henry Singer Keating	Liberal
January 1860	Francis Pigott	Liberal	Sir Francis Goldsmid	Liberal
November 1860	Gillery Pigott	Liberal	Sir Francis Goldsmid	Liberal
1863	George Shaw-Lefevre	Liberal	Sir Francis Goldsmid	Liberal
1878	George Shaw-Lefevre	Liberal	George Palmer	Liberal
1885	Representation reduced to one member			

=== 1885–1950 ===
Election	Member	Party
1885	Charles Townshend Murdoch	Conservative
1892	George William Palmer	Liberal
1895	Charles Townshend Murdoch	Conservative
1898 by-election	George William Palmer	Liberal
1904 by-election	Rufus Isaacs	Liberal
1913 by-election	Leslie Orme Wilson	Conservative
1922	Edward Cadogan	Conservative
1923	Somerville Hastings	Labour
1924	Herbert Williams	Conservative
1929	Somerville Hastings	Labour
1931	Alfred Howitt	Conservative
1945	Ian Mikardo	Labour
1950	Constituency divided into Reading North and Reading South	

=== 1955–1974 ===
Election	Member	Party
1955	Constituency recreated	
1955	Ian Mikardo	Labour
1959	Peter Emery	Conservative
1966	John Lee	Labour
1970	Gerard Vaughan	Conservative
Feb 1974	Constituency redivided into Reading North and Reading South	

== Elections ==
=== Elections in the 1830s ===
General election 1830: Reading (2 seats)
Party	Candidate	Votes	%	±%
Whig	Charles Fyshe Palmer	522	36.1	
Tory	Charles Russell	471	32.6	
Whig	Stephen Lushington	452	31.3	
Turnout		907	c. 72.6	
Registered electors		c. 1,250		
Majority		51	3.5	
Whig hold		Swing		
Majority		19	1.3	
Tory hold		Swing		

General election 1831: Reading (2 seats)
Party	Candidate	Votes	%
Whig	Charles Fyshe Palmer	Unopposed	
Tory	Charles Russell	Unopposed	
Registered electors		c. 1,250	
Whig hold			
Tory hold			

General election 1832: Reading (2 seats)
Party	Candidate	Votes	%
Whig	Charles Fyshe Palmer	Unopposed	
Tory	Charles Russell	Unopposed	
Registered electors		1,001	
Whig hold			
Tory hold			

General election 1835: Reading (2 seats)
Party	Candidate	Votes	%
Radical	Thomas Talfourd	643	43.8
Conservative	Charles Russell	441	30.0
Whig	Benjamin Oliveira	384	26.2
Turnout		960	95.8
Registered electors		1,002	
Majority		202	13.8
Radical gain from Whig			
Majority		57	3.8
Conservative hold			

General election 1837: Reading (2 seats)
Party	Candidate	Votes	%	±%
Radical	Thomas Talfourd	468	34.1	−9.7
Whig	Charles Fyshe Palmer	457	33.3	+7.1
Conservative	Charles Russell	448	32.6	+2.6
Turnout		875	84.5	−11.3
Registered electors		1,035		
Majority		11	0.8	−13.0
Radical hold		Swing	−5.5	
Majority		9	0.7	N/A
Whig gain from Conservative		Swing	+2.9	

=== Elections in the 1840s ===
General election 1841: Reading (2 seats)
Party	Candidate	Votes	%	±%
Conservative	Charles Russell	570	29.4	+13.1
Conservative	Henry Cadogan, Viscount Chelsea	564	29.1	+12.8
Whig	Thomas Mills	410	21.1	+4.5
Whig	William Tooke	397	20.5	+3.9
Majority		154	8.0	N/A
Turnout		984	82.4	−2.1
Registered electors		1,194		
Conservative gain from Whig		Swing	+4.5	
Conservative gain from Radical		Swing	+4.3	

Mills lodged an election petition alleging bribery and corruption by Russell and Chelsea, who lodged a counter-petition against Mills. The three signed an agreement that the petitions would be dropped and one of the Conservatives would resign to allow Mills to fill the vacancy unopposed. However, when Chelsea applied for the Stewardship of the Chiltern Hundreds in August, Chancellor Henry Goulburn refused to grant it on the ground that it would condone electoral malpractice.

General election 1847: Reading (2 seats)
Party	Candidate	Votes	%	±%
Whig	Francis Pigott	614	29.1	+8.0
Radical	Thomas Talfourd	596	28.3	+7.8
Conservative	Charles Russell	521	24.7	−4.7
Conservative	Henry Cadogan, Viscount Chelsea	376	17.8	−11.3
Turnout		1,054 (est)	84.2 (est)	+1.8
Registered electors		1,251		
Majority		238	11.3	N/A
Whig gain from Conservative		Swing	+8.0	
Majority		75	3.6	N/A
Radical gain from Conservative		Swing	+7.9	

Talfourd resigned after being appointed a judge of the Court of Common Pleas, causing a by-election.

By-election, 8 August 1849: Reading
Party	Candidate	Votes	%	±%
Conservative	John Frederick Stanford	507	51.8	+9.3
Whig	George Bowyer	364	37.2	+8.1
Radical	Thomas Norton	107	10.9	−17.4
Majority		143	14.6	N/A
Turnout		978	74.7	−9.5
Registered electors		1,309		
Conservative gain from Radical		Swing	+13.4	

=== Elections in the 1850s ===
General election 1852: Reading (2 seats)
Party	Candidate	Votes	%	±%
Whig	Francis Pigott	753	39.6	+10.5
Whig	Henry Singer Keating	631	33.2	+4.9
Conservative	Samuel Auchmuty Dickson	518	27.2	−15.3
Majority		113	6.0	N/A
Turnout		951 (est)	68.0 (est)	−16.2
Registered electors		1,399		
Whig hold		Swing	+9.1	
Whig gain from Radical		Swing	+6.3	

General election 1857: Reading (2 seats)
Party	Candidate	Votes	%	±%
Whig	Francis Pigott	Unopposed		
Whig	Henry Singer Keating	Unopposed		
Registered electors		1,431		
Whig hold				
Whig hold				

Keating was appointed Solicitor General for England and Wales, requiring a by-election.

By-election, 2 June 1857: Reading
Party	Candidate	Votes	%	±%
Whig	Henry Singer Keating	Unopposed		
Whig hold				

General election 1859: Reading (2 seats)
Party	Candidate	Votes	%
Liberal	Francis Pigott	761	38.6
Liberal	Henry Singer Keating	666	33.8
Conservative	Ralph Augustus Benson	544	27.6
Majority		122	6.2
Turnout		986 (est)	67.9 (est)
Registered electors		1,451	
Liberal hold			
Liberal hold			

Keating was appointed Solicitor General for England and Wales, requiring a by-election.

By-election, 27 June 1859: Reading
Party	Candidate	Votes	%	±%
Liberal	Henry Singer Keating	Unopposed		
Liberal hold				

=== Elections in the 1860s ===
Keating resigned after being appointed a Judge of the Court of Common Pleas, causing a by-election.

By-election, 11 January 1860: Reading
Party	Candidate	Votes	%	±%
Liberal	Francis Goldsmid	661	54.5	−17.9
Conservative	Ralph Augustus Benson	551	45.5	+17.9
Majority		110	9.0	+2.8
Turnout		1,212	80.5	+12.6
Registered electors		1,506		
Liberal hold		Swing	−17.9	

Pigott resigned after being appointed Lieutenant Governor of the Isle of Man, causing a by-election.

By-election, 21 November 1860: Reading
Party	Candidate	Votes	%	±%
Liberal	Gillery Pigott	586	57.4	−15.0
Conservative	Edward Walter	435	42.6	+15.0
Majority		151	14.8	+8.6
Turnout		1,021	67.8	−0.1
Registered electors		1,506		
Liberal hold		Swing	−15.0	

Pigott resigned after being appointed a Judge of the Court of the Exchequer, causing a by-election.

By-election, 17 October 1863: Reading
Party	Candidate	Votes	%	±%
Liberal	George Shaw-Lefevre	Unopposed		
Liberal hold				

General election 1865: Reading (2 seats)
Party	Candidate	Votes	%	±%
Liberal	Francis Goldsmid	727	38.6	0.0
Liberal	George Shaw-Lefevre	714	37.9	+4.1
Conservative	Stephen Tucker	444	23.6	−4.0
Majority		270	14.3	+8.1
Turnout		1,165 (est)	65.8 (est)	−2.1
Registered electors		1,769		
Liberal hold		Swing	+2.0	
Liberal hold		Swing	+2.1	

Shaw-Lefevre was appointed a Civil Lord of the Admiralty, requiring a by-election.

By-election, 5 May 1866: Reading
Party	Candidate	Votes	%	±%
Liberal	George Shaw-Lefevre	Unopposed		
Liberal hold				

General election 1868: Reading (2 seats)
Party	Candidate	Votes	%	±%
Liberal	Francis Goldsmid	1,629	38.5	−0.1
Liberal	George Shaw-Lefevre	1,618	38.3	+0.4
Conservative	Robert Carden	979	23.2	−0.4
Majority		639	15.1	+0.8
Turnout		2,603 (est)	80.6 (est)	+14.8
Registered electors		3,228		
Liberal hold		Swing	+0.1	
Liberal hold		Swing	+0.3	

=== Elections in the 1870s ===
General election 1874: Reading (2 seats)
Party	Candidate	Votes	%	±%
Liberal	George Shaw-Lefevre	1,794	26.1	−12.2
Liberal	Francis Goldsmid	1,791	26.1	−12.4
Conservative	Richard Attenborough	1,652	24.1	+12.5
Conservative	William Dalziel Mackenzie	1,631	23.7	+12.1
Majority		139	2.0	−13.1
Turnout		3,434 (est)	83.4 (est)	+2.8
Registered electors		4,118		
Liberal hold		Swing	−12.3	
Liberal hold		Swing	−12.4	

Goldsmid's death caused a by-election.

By-election, 18 May 1878: Reading (1 seat)
Party	Candidate	Votes	%	±%
Liberal	George Palmer	2,223	58.7	+6.5
Conservative	Richard Attenborough	1,565	41.3	−6.5
Majority		658	17.4	+15.4
Turnout		3,788	80.2	−3.2
Registered electors		4,721		
Liberal hold		Swing	+6.5	

=== Elections in the 1880s ===
General election 1880: Reading (2 seats)
Party	Candidate	Votes	%	±%
Liberal	George Palmer	2,513	36.6	+10.5
Liberal	George Shaw-Lefevre	2,286	33.3	+7.2
Conservative	Albert George Sandeman	2,067	30.1	−17.7
Majority		219	3.2	+1.2
Turnout		4,580 (est)	89.7 (est)	+6.3
Registered electors		5,107		
Liberal hold		Swing	+9.7	
Liberal hold		Swing	+8.1	

Lefevre was appointed First Commissioner of Works and Public Buildings, requiring a by-election.

By-election, 15 Dec 1880: Reading (1 seat)
Party	Candidate	Votes	%	±%
Liberal	George Shaw-Lefevre	Unopposed		
Liberal hold				

General election 1885: Reading
Party	Candidate	Votes	%	±%
Conservative	Charles Townshend Murdoch	3,518	50.9	+20.8
Liberal	George Shaw-Lefevre	3,389	49.1	−20.8
Majority		129	1.8	N/A
Turnout		6,907	91.9	+2.2 (est)
Registered electors		7,515		
Conservative gain from Liberal		Swing	+20.8	

General election 1886: Reading
Party	Candidate	Votes	%	±%
Conservative	Charles Townshend Murdoch	3,378	50.9	0.0
Liberal	William Berkeley Monck	3,262	49.1	0.0
Majority		116	1.8	0.0
Turnout		6,640	88.4	−3.5
Registered electors		7,515		
Conservative hold		Swing	0.0	

=== Elections in the 1890s ===
General election 1892: Reading
Party	Candidate	Votes	%	±%
Liberal	George Palmer	3,990	51.9	+2.8
Conservative	Charles Townshend Murdoch	3,700	48.1	−2.8
Majority		290	3.8	N/A
Turnout		7,690	91.1	+2.7
Registered electors		8,438		
Liberal gain from Conservative		Swing	+2.8	

General election 1895: Reading
Party	Candidate	Votes	%	±%
Conservative	Charles Townshend Murdoch	4,278	52.1	+4.0
Liberal	George Palmer	3,927	47.9	−4.0
Majority		351	4.2	N/A
Turnout		8,205	90.1	−1.0
Registered electors		9,104		
Conservative gain from Liberal		Swing	+4.0	

Murdoch's death caused a by-election.

By-election, 25 Jul 1898: Reading
Party	Candidate	Votes	%	±%
Liberal	George Palmer	4,600	52.4	+4.5
Conservative	Charles Edward Keyser	3,906	44.5	−7.6
Social Democratic Federation	Harry Quelch	270	3.1	New
Majority		694	7.9	N/A
Turnout		8,776	91.7	+1.6
Registered electors		9,573		
Liberal gain from Conservative		Swing	+6.1	

=== Elections in the 1900s ===
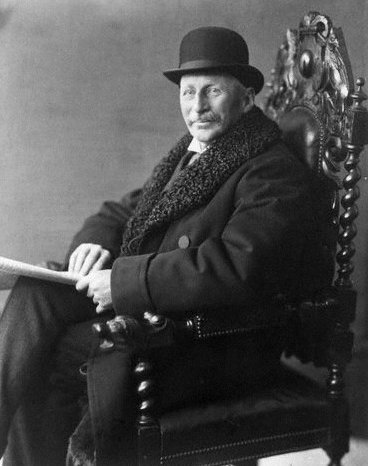
Keyser

General election 1900: Reading
Party	Candidate	Votes	%	±%
Liberal	George Palmer	4,592	51.3	+3.4
Conservative	Charles Edward Keyser	4,353	48.7	−3.4
Majority		239	2.6	N/A
Turnout		8,945	88.1	−2.0
Registered electors		10,152		
Liberal gain from Conservative		Swing	+3.4	

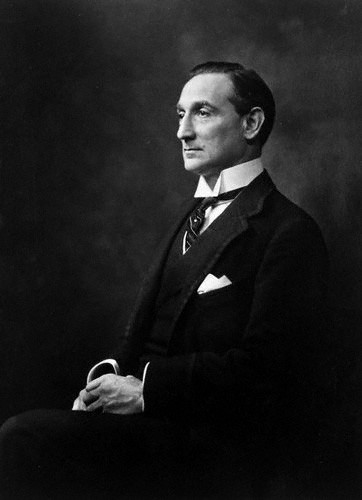
Isaacs

1904 Reading by-election
Party	Candidate	Votes	%	±%
Liberal	Rufus Isaacs	4,770	51.2	−0.1
Conservative	Charles Edward Keyser	4,540	48.8	+0.1
Majority		230	2.4	−0.2
Turnout		9,310	83.5	−4.6
Registered electors		11,151		
Liberal hold		Swing	-0.1	

General election 1906: Reading
Party	Candidate	Votes	%	±%
Liberal	Rufus Isaacs	5,407	53.4	+2.1
Conservative	George Horace Johnstone	4,710	46.6	−2.1
Majority		697	6.8	+ +4.2
Turnout		10,117	91.6	+3.5
Registered electors		11,041		
Liberal hold		Swing	+2.1	

=== Elections in the 1910s ===
General election January 1910: Reading
Party	Candidate	Votes	%	±%
Liberal	Rufus Isaacs	5,264	51.0	−2.4
Liberal Unionist	Leslie Renton	5,057	49.0	+2.4
Majority		207	2.0	−4.8
Turnout		10,321	93.7	+2.1
Registered electors		11,016		
Liberal hold		Swing	−2.4	

Isaacs is appointed Solicitor General for England and Wales, requiring a by-election.

By-election, March 1910
Party	Candidate	Votes	%	±%
Liberal	Rufus Isaacs	Unopposed		
Liberal hold				

General election December 1910: Reading
Party	Candidate	Votes	%	±%
Liberal	Rufus Isaacs	5,094	50.5	−0.5
Conservative	Leslie Orme Wilson	4,995	49.5	+0.5
Majority		99	1.0	−1.0
Turnout		10,089	91.6	−2.1
Registered electors		11,016		
Liberal hold		Swing	−0.5	

Issacs is appointed Lord Chief Justice of England and is elevated to the peerage as Lord Reading, requiring a by-election.

1913 Reading by-election
Party	Candidate	Votes	%	±%
Unionist	Leslie Orme Wilson	5,144	50.3	+0.8
Liberal	George Peabody Gooch	4,013	39.3	−11.2
British Socialist Party	Joseph George Butler	1,063	10.4	New
Majority		1,131	11.0	N/A
Turnout		10,220	92.2	+0.6
Registered electors		11,088		
Unionist gain from Liberal		Swing	+6.0	

A General Election was due to take place by the end of 1915. By the summer of 1914, the following candidates had been adopted to contest that election. Due to the outbreak of war, the election never took place.

- Unionist Party: Leslie Orme Wilson
- Liberal Party: Henry Norman Spalding
- British Socialist Party: Joseph George Butler

General election 14 December 1918: Reading
Party		Candidate	Votes	%	±%
C	Unionist	Leslie Orme Wilson	15,204	53.9	+4.4
	Labour	Thomas Charles Morris	8,410	29.8	New
	Liberal	Frederick Thoresby	3,143	11.1	−39.4
	National Socialist Party	Lorenzo Quelch	1,462	5.2	New
Majority			6,794	24.1	N/A
Turnout			28,219	62.2	−29.4
	Unionist gain from Liberal		Swing	+21.9	
C indicates candidate endorsed by the coalition government.

=== Elections in the 1920s ===
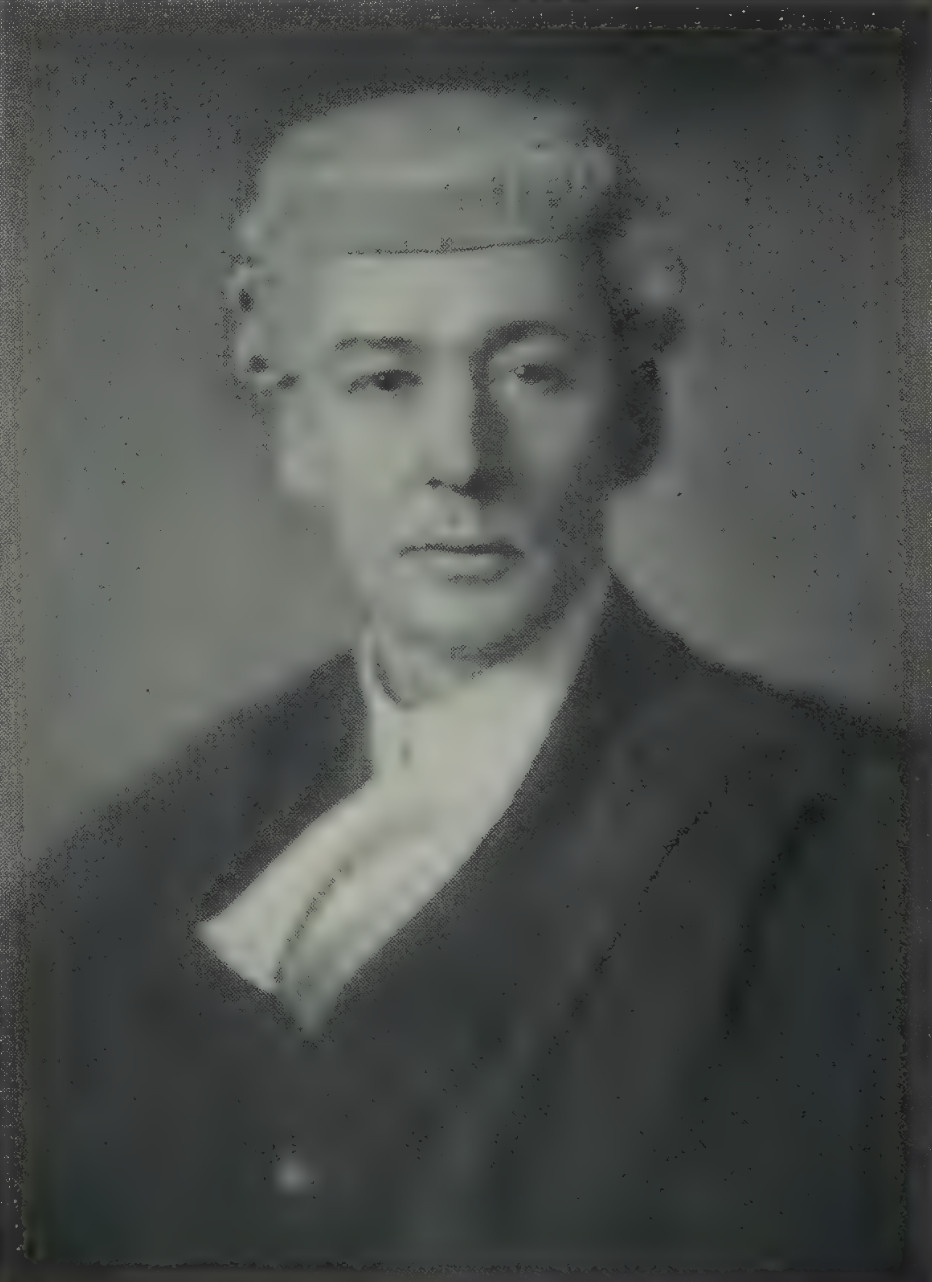
H.D. Roome

General election 1922: Reading
Party	Candidate	Votes	%	±%
Unionist	Edward Cadogan	16,082	42.7	−11.2
Labour	Derwent Hall Caine	14,322	38.1	+8.3
Liberal	Henry Delacombe Roome	7,212	19.2	+8.1
Majority		1,760	4.6	−19.5
Turnout		37,616		
Unionist hold		Swing		

General election 1923: Reading
Party	Candidate	Votes	%	±%
Labour	Somerville Hastings	16,657	44.8	+6.7
Unionist	Edward Cadogan	15,115	40.7	−2.0
Liberal	Frederick Maddison	5,406	14.5	−4.7
Majority		1,542	4.1	N/A
Turnout		37,178	82.1	
Labour gain from Unionist		Swing	+4.3	

General election 1924: Reading
Party	Candidate	Votes	%	±%
Unionist	Herbert Williams	21,338	53.8	+13.1
Labour	Somerville Hastings	18,337	46.2	+1.4
Majority		3,001	7.6	N/A
Turnout		39,675	85.8	+3.7
Unionist gain from Labour		Swing		

General election 1929: Reading
Party	Candidate	Votes	%	±%
Labour	Somerville Hastings	23,281	43.5	−2.7
Unionist	Herbert Williams	22,429	42.0	−11.8
Liberal	Dugald Macfadyen	7,733	14.5	New
Majority		852	1.5	N/A
Turnout		53,443	85.0	−0.8
Labour gain from Unionist		Swing	+4.5	

=== Elections in the 1930s ===
General election 1931: Reading Electorate 65,009
Party	Candidate	Votes	%	±%
Conservative	Alfred Howitt	34,439	63.1	+21.1
Labour	Somerville Hastings	19,277	35.3	−8.2
New Party	ER Troward	861	1.6	New
Majority		15,162	27.8	N/A
Turnout		54,577	83.9	−1.1
Conservative gain from Labour		Swing		

- The Liberal Party candidate, Rosalie Glynn Grylls withdrew at close of nominations

General election 1935: Reading Electorate 67,181
Party	Candidate	Votes	%	±%
Conservative	Alfred Howitt	27,540	51.8	−9.3
Labour	Somerville Hastings	22,949	43.2	+7.9
Liberal	John William Todd	2,685	5.0	New
Majority		4,591	8.6	−19.2
Turnout		53,174	79.1	−4.8
Conservative hold		Swing		

General Election 1939–40: Another General Election was required to take place before the end of 1940. The political parties had been making preparations for an election to take place and by the Autumn of 1939, the following candidates had been selected;

- Conservative: Alfred Howitt
- Labour: Margaret Bondfield

=== Elections in the 1940s ===
General election 1945: Reading
Party	Candidate	Votes	%	±%
Labour	Ian Mikardo	30,465	48.8	+5.6
Conservative	William Ewart Clarke McIlroy	24,075	38.6	−13.2
Liberal	Robert Nevill Tronchin James	7,834	12.6	+7.6
Majority		6,390	10.2	N/A
Turnout		62,374	73.5	−5.6
Labour gain from Conservative		Swing		

=== Elections in the 1950s ===
General election 1955: Reading
Party	Candidate	Votes	%	±%
Labour	Ian Mikardo	25,228	50.24	
Conservative	Frederic Bennett	24,990	49.76	
Majority		238	0.48	
Turnout		50,218	84.15	
Registered electors		59,678		
Labour win (new seat)				

General election 1959: Reading
Party	Candidate	Votes	%	±%
Conservative	Peter Emery	26,314	54.05	+4.29
Labour	Ian Mikardo	22,372	45.95	−4.29
Majority		3,942	8.10	N/A
Turnout		48,686	82.84	−1.31
Registered electors		58,772		
Conservative gain from Labour		Swing	+4.29	

=== Elections in the 1960s ===
General election 1964: Reading
Party	Candidate	Votes	%	±%
Conservative	Peter Emery	20,815	43.93	−10.12
Labour	John Lee	20,805	43.91	−2.04
Liberal	Michael F Burns	5,759	12.16	New
Majority		10	0.02	−8.08
Turnout		47,379	79.80	−3.04
Registered electors		59,371		
Conservative hold		Swing	-4.04	

General election 1966: Reading
Party	Candidate	Votes	%	±%
Labour	John Lee	25,338	51.01	+7.10
Conservative	Peter Emery	21,205	42.69	−1.24
Liberal	Ernest H Palfrey	3,127	6.30	−5.86
Majority		4,133	8.32	N/A
Turnout		49,670	84.00	+4.20
Registered electors		59,132		
Labour gain from Conservative		Swing	+4.17	

=== Elections in the 1970s ===
General election 1970: Reading
Party	Candidate	Votes	%	±%
Conservative	Gerard Vaughan	23,598	50.31	+7.62
Labour	John Lee	22,444	47.85	−3.16
Democratic Party	Alec Boothroyd	867	1.85	New
Majority		1,154	2.46	N/A
Turnout		46,909	74.04	−9.96
Registered electors		63,359		
Conservative gain from Labour		Swing	+5.39	

== See also ==
- List of parliamentary constituencies in Berkshire
