= William Kyng =

English politician

William Kyng (fl. 1420 – 1434) was an English politician. He sat as MP for Reading in December 1421.

He was probably the son of John Kyng and Maud. He married Alice.

He witnessed the election of 1420 and was returned in 1421.

From 1424 to 1425, he held the office of cofferer of the merchant guild in Reading.

Between 1429 and 1434, he rented several properties in Castle Street from the commonality of Reading. One of which he paid 5 shillings and 3 pence for.
