= Oliver Vachell =

16th-century English politician

Oliver Vachell (c. 1518 – 24 May 1564), of Buriton, near Petersfield, Hampshire and North Marston, Buckinghamshire, was an English politician and diplomat.

== Family ==
He was the younger son of Thomas Vachell of Coley, Berkshire by his second wife Margaret and half-brother of Thomas. Vachell was married by 25 August 1537 to Margaret, a daughter of Richard Norton of East Tisted, Hampshire.

== Career ==
By 1537 he was a gentleman in the household of Stephen Gardiner, Bishop of Winchester. A French speaker, he accompanied Gardiner on diplomatic missions and was used as a messenger. In 1545 he led a contingent of 220 men from the hundred of East Meon to Portsmouth, when the French invaded the Isle of Wight. He was a Member (MP) of the Parliament of England for Hindon in October 1553 and Taunton in April 1554, both seats being in Gardiner's patronage. He remained in Gardiner's service until the latter's death and was a witness to the bishop's will, by which he was left £20.

== Children ==
In 1566 he was recorded as having 2 sons and 4 daughters:

- Stephen, who inherited the manor of North Marston from his father, but sold it in 1573. A recusant, he married Mary, daughter of William Stone and Frances Palmer, through whom he inherited a share in the manor of Buriton.
- Thomas
- Elizabeth married to Robert Joye of Farnham, Surrey
- Margery
- Mary
- Anne
