= George William Palmer (British politician) =

British politician

George William Palmer (23 May 1851 – 8 October 1913) was a member of the Palmer family, proprietors of the Huntley & Palmers biscuit manufacturers of Reading in England.

He was born in Reading, the son of George Palmer and his wife, Elizabeth Sarah, the daughter of Robert Meteyard. Like his father, George William Palmer served as mayor of Reading and represented the town in parliament. He served as Liberal Member of Parliament for the Reading borough constituency from 1892 until his defeat at the 1895 general election. He regained the seat at a by-election in 1898, and held it until he resigned from Parliament in 1904, due to advancing deafness.

He received the honorary Freedom of the Borough of Reading on 3 December 1902, for valuable public service rendered to the town. He was only the second person to receive this honour, the first being his father.

His country estate was Marlston House in Bucklebury.

== Notes ==
Parliament of the United Kingdom
Preceded by Charles Townshend Murdoch	Member of Parliament for Reading; 1892 – 1895	Succeeded by Charles Townshend Murdoch
Preceded by Charles Townshend Murdoch	Member of Parliament for Reading; 1898 – 1904	Succeeded by Rufus Isaacs
