= Tanfield Vachell =

English politician

Tanfield Vachell (1602–1658) was an English politician who sat in the House of Commons between 1645 and 1653.

Vachell was the son of John Vachell of Warfield and his wife Mary Vincent, daughter of Clement Vincent of Peckleton, Leicestershire. He was baptised in Gayton, Northamptonshire on 27 December 1602. He was educated at Exeter College, Oxford, taking BA in 1622.

His uncle, Sir Thomas Vachell of Coley Park in Reading, Berkshire, who had married three times and had no issue, wanted someone of his name and blood to inherit the Vachell estates which had become concentrated upon him. Vachell was therefore persuaded to marry and after the uncle's death in 1638, Vachell inherited the estates. He was High Sheriff of Berkshire in 1641.

Vachell was also influenced by his uncle's widow, Lady Letitia (née Knollys) Vachell who married John Hampden, and supported the Parliamentary cause during the Civil War. Lady Vachell carried on living at Coley Park, whilst Tanfield rented the Reading home of her grandfather at Abbey House. On 1 November 1642, the King gave instructions for Vachell to escort him through the county, but as this had previously been an excuse to disband local militia, Vachell refused to obey.

In 1645, Vachell was elected Member of Parliament for Reading in a disputed election to the Long Parliament.

Vachell was more concerned with arts than politics and built a collection of rare pictures, books and curios. His portrait was painted by Sir Peter Lely. In around 1651, he restored Coley Park.

Vachell died at Reading in May 1658 and was buried in St Mary's Church in Reading on 1 June 1658.

Vachell married firstly Anne Cox, daughter of Richard Cox, an alderman of London. She died childless in 1651 and was buried in the chancel of St. Mary Woolnoth in London. In 1652, he married Rebecca Leman, daughter of Sir William Leman, 1st Baronet, Parliament's Treasurer of War. She survived him, but he had no issue by either wife.

Vachell left his "several paintings and books of print, [his] collection of medals in gold, silver and brass; all [his] ware, turnings of ivory and guyacombe with [his] presse of bookes and [his] chest of drawers with the perspective in it, to his wife for life, and failing issue to the son of his kinsman, Thomas." A codicil executed in his last illness, resulted in about fifteen years' litigation between his widow and his heir. After the Lord Chief Justice, the Lord Chief Baron and various civilians became involved, the case was eventually decided in favour of his heir. It is still a leading case — Vachell v. Leman. The Coley estate passed, upon his death to Thomas Vatchell, the son of his kinsman Thomas who had refused his uncle's request to marry. The suburb of Coley Park was built largely on the lands of the estate.

Parliament of England
| Preceded by Sir Francis Knollys sen. Sir Francis Knollys jun. | Member of Parliament for Reading; 1645–1653; With: Sir Francis Knollys sen. 1645–1648; Daniel Blagrave 1648–1653 | Succeeded by Not represented in Barebones Parliament |
