= William Derby (fl. 1404) =

Member of the Parliament of England

William Derby (fl. 1404) was a Member of Parliament for Reading in 1404.
