= William Justice (MP) =

English politician

William Justice (by 1448 – 1521) was an English politician.

He was made Sheriff (1495–96) and Mayor of Southampton (1501–02) where he traded in wine and other commodities from 1481. After moving to Reading, Berkshire he was elected a Member (MP) of the Parliament of England for Reading in 1510. He was also made mayor of Reading for 1513–14 and for January–September 1517.

He married Alice, the daughter of John Martin of Wokingham, Berkshire and had 2 sons and 2 daughters. His sons-in-law were the MPs, Richard Lybbe and Thomas Vachell.
