= Humphrey Forster =

English politician and high sheriff

Sir Humphrey Forster (died 1602) was an English politician and high sheriff.

He was the son of William Forster of Aldermaston House in Berkshire which he inherited in 1575.

He was appointed High Sheriff of Berkshire in 1580 and 1593. In 1593, during the reign of Elizabeth I, Sir Humphrey was Member of Parliament for Berkshire. He was later (1597) MP for Reading.

He married Margaret, the daughter of John Barrett of Stanford Dingley, Berkshire. They had some nine children, including his eldest son and heir, William.
