= Thomas Charles Morris =

Welsh politician and social activist

Thomas Charles Morris, often known as "Top Cat" Morris, was a Welsh trade unionist and socialist activist, who served on the National Executive Committee of the Labour Party.

Born in Llanidloes, Morris began working as a railway signalman and joined the National Union of Railwaymen (NUR). He served as secretary of the union's Ystrad branch for eight years, and served on the union's executive council from 1916 until 1918, during which period the union secured a maximum eight-hour working day for railway staff.

Morris was also active in the Labour Party, serving as president of the Rhondda Borough Labour Party for six years, president of the Pentre Trades and Labour Council for two years, and as editor of the Rhondda Socialist for two years. He stood unsuccessfully for the party in Reading at the 1918 United Kingdom general election, taking 29.8% of the vote and second place.

In 1919, the National Executive Committee (NEC) of the Labour Party was reconstituted, and Morris became one of the first representatives of a Constituency Labour Party to serve on the NEC. Later in the year, he became the party's full-time organiser for Wales, and so did not restand for the position.
