= William Owen (Oxford MP) =

English politician

William Owen (c. 1540 – by 1580) was an English politician.

He was a member (MP) of the parliament of England for Oxford in 1572.
