= William Stapper =

English politician

William Stapper (fl. 1386), of Reading, Berkshire, was an English politician.

== Family ==
Stapper married Elizabeth, and they had a son, Stephen Stapper, also an MP. In his poll tax information from 1379, he is shown as already married and his occupation is given as weaver.

== Career ==
Stapper was a member (MP) of the parliament of England for Reading in 1386.
