= Richard Lybbe =

16th-century English politician

Richard Lybbe (1479–1527/28), of Tavistock, Devon and Englefield, Berkshire, was an English politician.

== Family ==
Lybbe was the eldest son of Richard Lybbe of Tavistock and his wife, Joan. Lybbe married, in 1521 or later, Bridget Justice, daughter of the MP, William Justice. They had one son and two daughters.

== Career ==
He was a member (MP) of the Parliament of England for Tavistock in 1515.
