= David atte Hacche =

Member of the Parliament of England

David atte Hacche (fl. 1377–1393) was a politician from Reading in the English county of Berkshire.

== Family ==
David may possibly have originated from Hare Hatch in Wargrave, east of Reading. He became a victualler in Reading and the poll tax information from 1379 shows him to have been married to a woman named Maud.

== Political career ==
Hacche was Mayor of Reading from 1382 until 1383. He was also elected a member (MP) of the parliament of England for Reading in October 1377, 1378, February 1388 and 1393.
