= Joseph George Butler =

British politician

Joseph George Butler (born 1869) was a British politician and trade unionist, who served on London County Council (LCC).

== Early life ==
Born in Peckham, Butler began working when he was seven years old. For many years, he worked in a factory making clothing for the British Army, and in 1895 he founded the Army Clothing Employees' Union, serving as its secretary. During the 1910s, he was also secretary of the United Government Workers' Federation.

== Political career ==
Butler joined the Social Democratic Federation (SDF), and unsuccessfully contested Kennington for the party in the 1907 London County Council election. The SDF became the core of the British Socialist Party (BSP), and under this description, Butler stood in the 1913 London County Council election in Stepney, but took only 108 votes. Later in the year, he contested the 1913 Reading by-election. He received the support of the Independent Labour Party and the local trades council, but was only able to take 10.4% of the vote and third place. The BSP affiliated to the Labour Party, and under this label he was more successful, taking 24.1% of the vote in Hastings at the 1918 United Kingdom general election, and then winning Battersea North at the 1919 London County Council election. He was one of the county council's representatives on the Metropolitan Water Board.

Unlike the majority of the BSP, Butler remained with the Labour Party rather than joining the new Communist Party of Great Britain, and he chaired Westminster Labour Party from 1921 to 1926. He held his council seat until 1928, after which he became a newsagent, continued his trade union activity. He also continued to contest Parliamentary elections, taking a distant second in Westminster Abbey at the 1922 United Kingdom general election, third place in Willesden East at the 1923 United Kingdom general election, and second in Westminster St George's at the 1929 United Kingdom general election. Finally, he stood in Balham and Tooting at the 1931 London County Council election, taking fourth place.
