= Stephen Stapper =

English politician

Stephen Stapper (fl. 1414) or Stepper, of Reading, Berkshire, was an English politician.

== Family ==
Stapper was probably the son of MP, William Stapper.

== Career ==
He was a member (MP) of the parliament of England for Reading in November 1414.
