= Gillery Pigott =

British Liberal politician and judge

Sir Gillery Pigott KBE
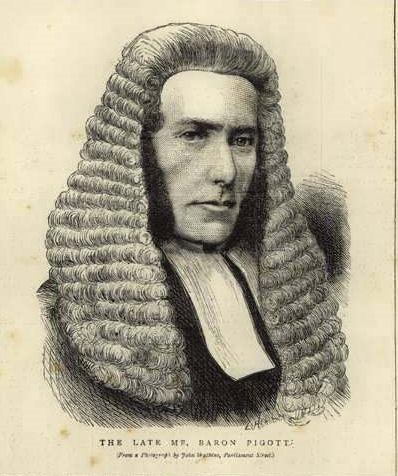
- Mr Baron Pigott (1875)

Member of Parliament for Reading
- In office 21 November 1860 – 3 October 1863 Serving with Francis Goldsmid
- Preceded by: Francis Pigott; Francis Goldsmid
- Succeeded by: Francis Goldsmid; George Shaw-Lefevre

Personal details
- Born: 18 September 1813 Oxford, Oxfordshire
- Died: 27 April 1875 (aged 61) Sherfield Hill House, Sherfield on Loddon, Hampshire
- Resting place: Sherfield on Loddon, Hampshire
- Party: Liberal
- Spouse: Lucy Gough (m. 1836)
- Parent(s): Paynton Pigott Stainsby-Conant; Lucy Drope Gough

Sir Gillery Pigott (18 September 1813 – 27 April 1875) was a British Liberal Party politician and judge.

== Early life and family ==
Born in Oxford in 1813, Pigott was the fourth son of Paynton Pigott (later Stainsby-Conant) and Lucy, third daughter of Richard Drope Gough. He was educated in Putney at the school of Reverend William Carmalt. In 1836, he married Frances, daughter of Thomas Drake, and they had eight children: two sons and six daughters.

== Legal career ==
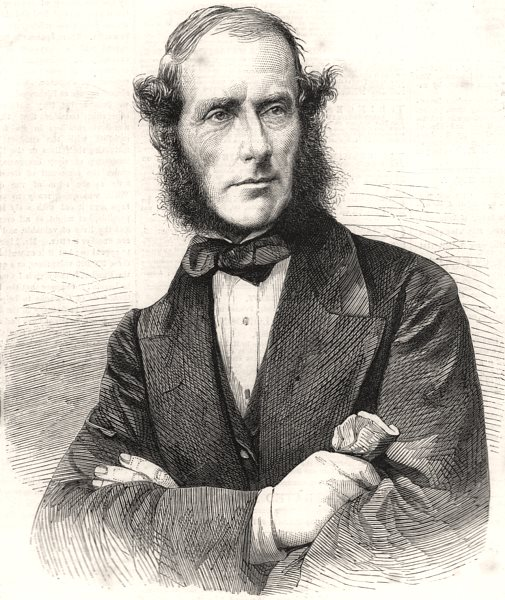
The Hon. Mr. Baron Pigott - The Illustrated London News (1863)

Pigott launched his legal career in 1836 when he entered the Middle Temple, and three years later he was called to the bar and entered the Oxford circuit. There, he worked with H Rodwell to serialise reports of appeals from revising barristers between 1844 and 1846.

In 1854, he was made counsel to the Inland Revenue and in 1856, he became serjeant, receiving a patent of precedence the following year. From December 1857 to December 1862, he was recorder of Hereford.

Pigott was made a Baron of the Court of the Exchequer on 3 October 1863, and was knighted on 1 November. The appointment was initially received with disfavour by the bar, but he became well-liked and recognised for strict impartiality and conscientiousness in his arbitration.

== Political career ==
Pigott first launched his bid for a seat in the House of Commons in 1859, when he stood for Banbury; he retired before polling day. The next year, he was elected MP for Reading at a by-election – caused by his elder brother Francis Pigott Stainsby Conant being appointed Lieutenant Governor of the Isle of Man — but resigned just under three years later when he became the last baron appointed a judge of the Court of the Exchequer. During his brief period in parliament, he made a notable effort to introduce a law correcting anomalies in Jersey law.

== Death ==
Pigott died at his home, Sherfield Hill House, near Basingstoke, Hampshire on 27 April 1875 from a heart attack precipitated by a fall from his horse. He was buried at the parish church at Sherfield upon Lodden the next day. His son, Arthur Gough Pigott, banned the Anglican burial service being read over the coffin, leading to a £1 fine with costs.

== Arms ==
Coat of arms of Gillery Pigott

Crest
A greyhound statant per pale Sable and Ermine.
Escutcheon
Per fess Ermine and Sable three pickaxes counterchanged.

Parliament of the United Kingdom
Preceded by Francis Pigott; Francis Goldsmid	Member of Parliament for Reading; 1860–1863; With: Francis Goldsmid	Succeeded by Francis Goldsmid; George Shaw-Lefevre
