= John Frederick Stanford =

John Frederick Stanford (1815–1880) was an English barrister, literary scholar and politician.

== Life ==
He was the youngest son of Major Francis William Stanford of the 1st Life Guards, from County Mayo, and his second wife Mary, daughter of William Gorton. He was half-brother to Sir Robert Stanford (1806–1877). He was educated at Eton College, and was admitted a pensioner of Trinity College, Cambridge in 1832. He did not reside there, and was admitted to Christ's College in 1834, matriculating in 1834, and graduating B.A. in 1838, M.A. in 1842.

Stanford was admitted to Lincoln's Inn in 1841, was called to the bar in 1844, and that year became a Fellow of the Royal Society. He was elected Member of Parliament for Reading in 1849, serving until 1852. He belonged to the Conservatives.

== Legacy ==
Stanford left £5,000 to the University of Cambridge which went to support the creation of a dictionary of anglicised words which was finally published as Charles Fennell's Stanford Dictionary of Anglicised Words and Phrases. The project was intended to complete his own Etymological Dictionary dealing with words and phrases from other languages adopted in English, a work that had consumed Stanford in the final years of his life. Stanford had struggled to find a home for the project: it had been rejected by the Philological Society in the 1870s and, when it was offered to Cambridge, Edward Byles Cowell, Walter Skeat and Aldis Wright all considered that the bequest should be rejected, but they were not in the majority when it came to a vote.

He also left £25,000 to St Mary's Hospital in Paddington and £5,000 to the Royal National Lifeboat Institution, for a boat named after his mother Mary. There have been two such boats, RNLB Mary Stanford (ON 661) and RNLB Mary Stanford (ON 733).

== Works ==
Stanford wrote pamphlets on political economy. His works included:

- Outlines of a Plan of National Education (1839)
- Rambles and Researches in Thuringian Saxony (1842)
- On the Suppression of Mendicancy in the Metropolis (1847), speech
- The Patriots of Italy: an Appeal in Their Behalf (1847)
