= Rufus Isaacs, 1st Marquess of Reading =

British politician (1860–1935)

The Most Honourable The Marquess of Reading GCB GCSI GCIE GCVO PC
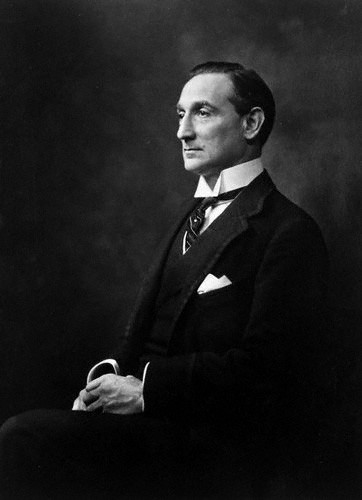
- Isaacs, c. 1910s

Leader of the House of Lords
- In office 25 August 1931 – 5 November 1931
- Prime Minister: Ramsay MacDonald
- Preceded by: The Lord Parmoor
- Succeeded by: The Viscount Hailsham

Secretary of State for Foreign Affairs
- In office 25 August 1931 – 5 November 1931
- Prime Minister: Ramsay MacDonald
- Preceded by: Arthur Henderson
- Succeeded by: Sir John Simon

Viceroy and Governor-General of India
- In office 2 April 1921 – 3 April 1926
- Monarch: George V
- Prime Minister: See list: David Lloyd George Bonar Law Stanley Baldwin Ramsay MacDonald
- Preceded by: The Lord Chelmsford
- Succeeded by: The Lord Irwin

Lord Chief Justice of England
- In office 21 October 1913 – 8 March 1921
- Appointed by: George V
- Preceded by: The Viscount Alverstone
- Succeeded by: The Lord Trevethin

Attorney General for England and Wales
- In office 7 October 1910 – 19 October 1913
- Prime Minister: H. H. Asquith
- Preceded by: Sir William Robson
- Succeeded by: Sir John Simon

Solicitor General for England and Wales
- In office 6 March 1910 – 7 October 1910
- Prime Minister: H. H. Asquith
- Preceded by: Sir Samuel Evans
- Succeeded by: Sir John Simon

Member of the House of Lords Lord Temporal
- In office 9 January 1914 – 30 December 1935; Hereditary Peerage
- Preceded by: Peerage created
- Succeeded by: The 2nd Marquess of Reading

Member of Parliament for Reading
- In office 6 August 1904 – 19 October 1913
- Preceded by: George William Palmer
- Succeeded by: Leslie Orme Wilson

Personal details
- Born: Rufus Daniel Isaacs; 10 October 1860 Tower Hamlets, London, England
- Died: 30 December 1935 (aged 75) Mayfair, London, England
- Party: Liberal
- Spouses: Alice Edith Cohen (m. 1887; died 1930) Stella Charnaud (m. 1931)
- Children: Gerald Isaacs, 2nd Marquess of Reading
- Education: University College School
- Profession: Lawyer, jurist, politician

Rufus Daniel Isaacs, 1st Marquess of Reading (10 October 1860 – 30 December 1935), known as the Earl of Reading from 1917 to 1926, was a British Liberal politician and judge, who served as Lord Chief Justice of England, Viceroy of India, and Foreign Secretary, the last Liberal to hold that post. The second practising Jew to be a member of the British cabinet (the first being Herbert Samuel, who was also a member of H. H. Asquith's government), Isaacs was the first Jewish Lord Chief Justice, and the first British Jew to become a marquess.

== Early life ==
Rufus Isaacs was born at 3 Bury Street, in the parish of St Mary Axe, London, the son of a Jewish fruit importer at Spitalfields. He was educated at University College School and then entered the family business at the age of 15. In 1876–77 he served as a ship's boy and later worked as a jobber on the stock-exchange from 1880 to 1884.

== Legal career ==
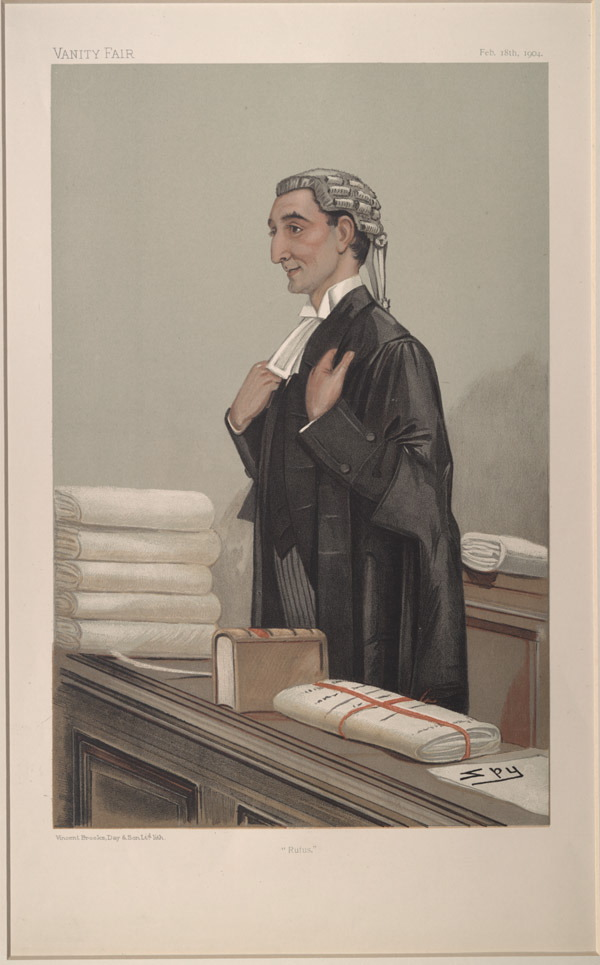
Isaacs caricatured by Spy for Vanity Fair, 1904

Isaacs was admitted as a student to the Middle Temple in 1885, and was called to the Bar in 1887. He set up his own chambers at 1 Garden Court, Temple, and was very successful; within five years he was able to repay his creditors, and after twenty years at the bar earned the enormous sum of £30,000 per year. He was appointed a Queen's Counsel in 1898, after only ten and half years at the junior bar.

Isaacs mainly practised in the Commercial Court, with occasional appearance in the divorce court or at the Old Bailey. Among his famous cases were the defence of The Star against a charge of libel by Arthur Chamberlain (at the behest of his brother Joseph), the Taff Vale case (where he appeared for the union), the 1903 Bayliss v. Coleridge libel suit, the prosecution of the fraudster Whitaker Wright, the defence of Sir Edward Russell on a charge of criminal libel, and that of Robert Sievier on a charge of blackmail.

As a barrister, Isaacs was a hard worker, rising early to prepare his cases, although he never worked after dinner. His advocacy was calm and forensic, and he was renowned for his style of cross-examination.

== Political career ==
Having earlier contested unsuccessfully North Kensington in 1900, Isaacs entered the House of Commons as the Liberal Party member of Parliament (MP) for Reading at the by-election on 6 August 1904, a seat he held for nine years until 1913.

In 1910, he was appointed solicitor general in the government of H. H. Asquith and received the customary knighthood. After six months, he was appointed attorney general. On the resignation of Lord Loreburn as Lord Chancellor in 1912, Isaacs had expected to succeed him, but was passed over in favour of Lord Haldane. To appease him, Asquith invited Isaacs to join the Cabinet; he was the first attorney general to sit in the Cabinet.

As law officer, Isaacs handled many high-profile cases. As solicitor general, he appeared for the Admiralty in the George Archer-Shee case. As attorney general, he led the prosecutions of Edward Mylius for criminal libel against King George V (and was appointed KCVO shortly after), of poisoner Frederick Seddon (the only murder trial Isaacs ever took part in), and of suffragette Emmeline Pankhurst. He also represented the Board of Trade at the inquiry into the sinking of the RMS Titanic.

In addition, he helped to pilot through the Commons several pieces of key legislation, including the Parliament Act 1911, the Official Secrets Act 1911, the National Insurance Act 1911, the Trade Union Act 1913, and the Government of Ireland Act 1914. He was appointed to the Privy Council in the 1911 Coronation Honours.

=== Marconi scandal ===
Isaacs was one of several high-ranking members of the Liberal government accused of involvement in the Marconi scandal. An article published in Le Matin on 14 February 1913 alleged corruption in the award of a government contract to the Marconi Company and insider trading in Marconi's shares, implicating a number of sitting government ministers, including Lloyd George, the chancellor of the Exchequer; Isaacs, then attorney general; Herbert Samuel, postmaster general; and the treasurer of the Liberal Party, Lord Murray.

The allegations included the fact that Isaacs's brother, Godfrey Isaacs, was managing director of the Marconi company at the time that the cabinet, in which Isaacs sat, awarded Marconi the contract. Isaacs and Samuels sued Le Matin for libel, and as a result, the journal apologised and printed a complete retraction in its 18 February 1913 issue.

The factual matters were at least partly resolved by a parliamentary select committee investigation, which issued three reports: all found that Isaacs and others had purchased shares in the American Marconi company, but while the fellow-Liberal members of the committee cleared the ministers of all blame, the opposition members reported that Isaacs and others had acted with "grave impropriety". It was not made public during the trial that these shares had been made available through Isaacs's brother at a favourable price.

== Diplomatic career ==
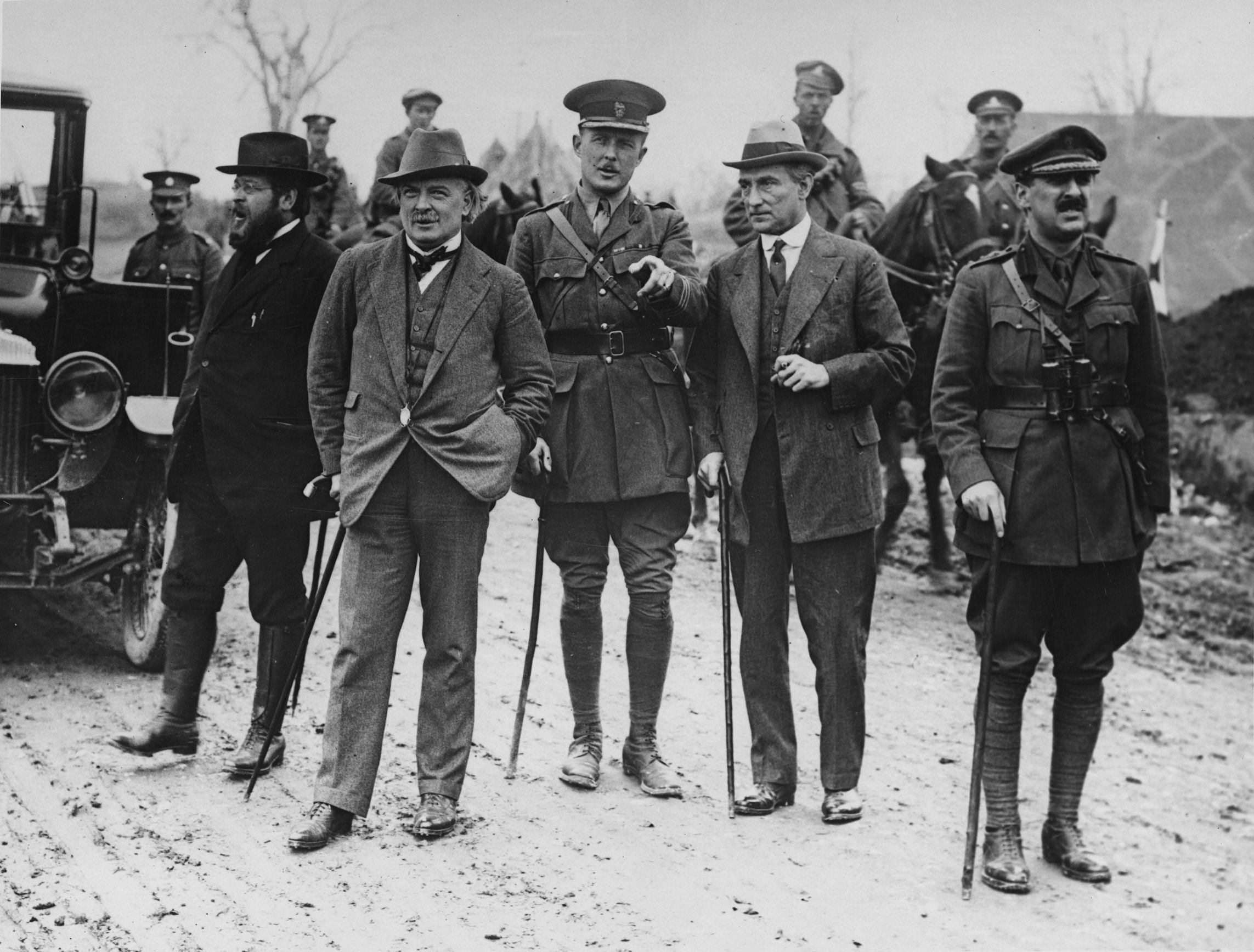
Lloyd George (2nd left), Reading (2nd right) and Albert Thomas (far left) in France, 1916.

In October 1913 he was made Lord Chief Justice of England, in succession to the Viscount Alverstone. At the time the Attorney General had the right of first refusal for the appointment, but his involvement in the Marconi scandal complicated matters. Although reluctant to abandon his political career Isaacs felt he had little choice: to refuse would be to suggest that the Marconi scandal had tainted him. Consequently, he accepted the post, and was elevated to the peerage as Baron Reading, of Erleigh in the County of Berkshire, on 9 January 1914. His appointment caused some controversy, and led to Rudyard Kipling attacking him in the poem "Gehazi".

As Lord Chief Justice, Reading presided over the trial of Roger Casement for high treason. His attendance in court was, however, intermittent, as he was frequently called upon by the government to serve as an advisor. In August 1914 Reading was enlisted to deal with the financial crisis brought about by the outbreak of the First World War. In 1915 he led the Anglo-French Financial Commission to seek financial assistance for the Allies from the United States. During the December 1916 Cabinet crisis, he acted as intermediary between Asquith and David Lloyd George.

In September 1917 Reading returned to the United States with the special appointment of high commissioner to the United States and Canada. In 1918 he was appointed British Ambassador to the United States, all the while remaining Lord Chief Justice. Returning to England for six months in 1918, he frequently attended the War Cabinet and was sent to France as Lloyd George's confidential emissary. He returned to the United States as Ambassador in 1919, relinquishing the post the same year. After the excitement of wartime diplomacy, he returned unwillingly to the bench in 1919, while seeking new appointments.

For his wartime public service he was appointed GCB in 1915, made Viscount Reading, of Erleigh in the County of Berkshire in 1916, and Earl of Reading as well as Viscount Erleigh, of Erleigh in the County of Berkshire, in 1917.

=== Viceroy of India ===
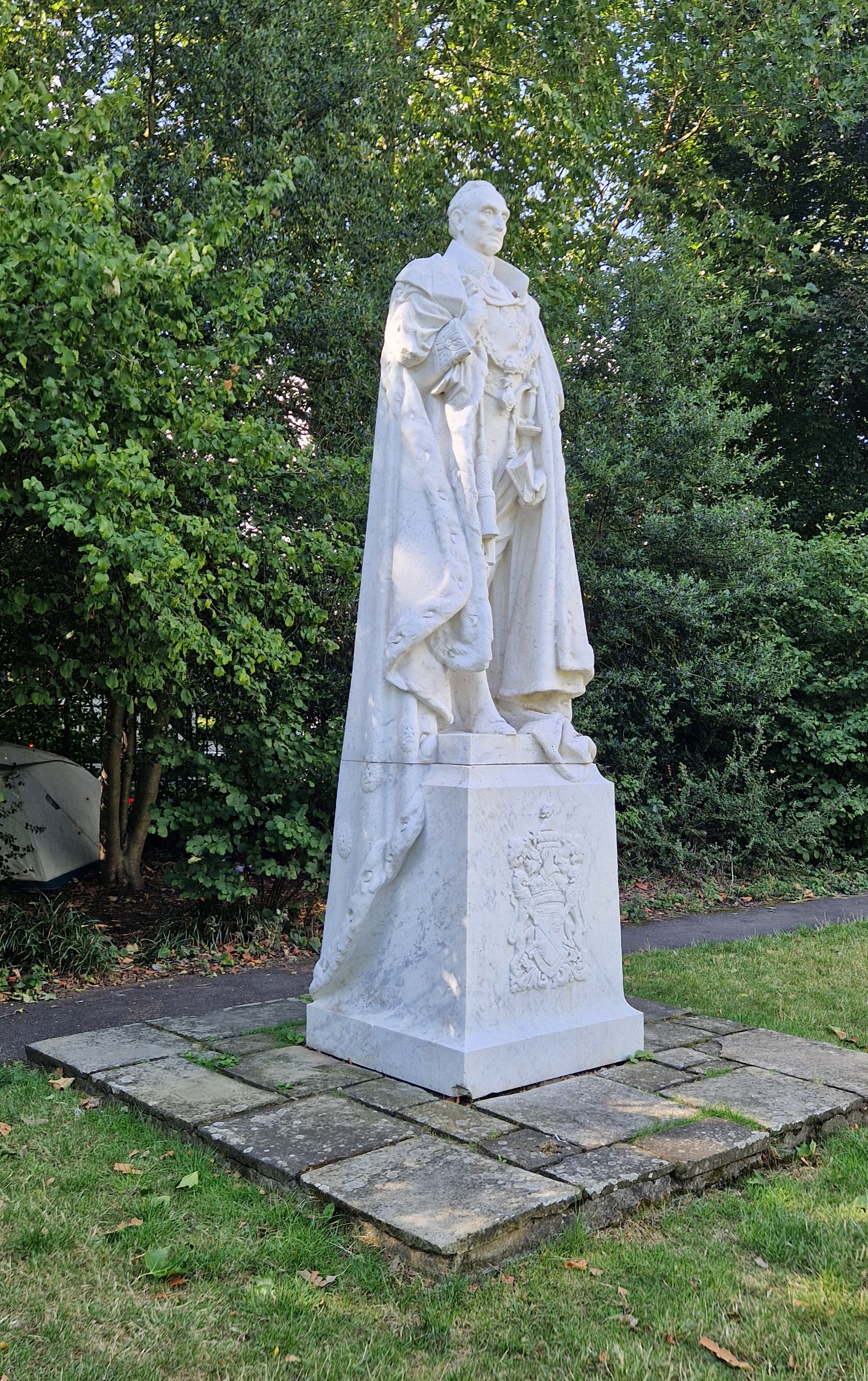
Statue of Isaacs as Viceroy of India, originally sited in New Delhi but now in Eldon Square Gardens in Reading

In 1921, he resigned the chief justiceship to become Viceroy and Governor-General of India. Reading preferred a conciliatory policy: he was determined to implement the provisions of the Government of India Act 1919 and opposed racial discrimination. He personally received Mohandas Karamchand Gandhi and Muhammad Ali Jinnah, and visited Amritsar as a gesture of reconciliation. However, he ended up using force on several occasions: in 1921 he ordered the suppression of the Malabar rebellion, and in 1922 he put down Sikh unrest in the Punjab. The same year, he had Gandhi arrested for sedition. Reading cultivated good relations with the Indian princes, but forced two maharajas to abdicate.

On his return from India in 1926, he was made Marquess of Reading, the first man to rise from commoner to a marquessate since the Duke of Wellington. The next year he was made Captain of Deal Castle in 1927, a position he held until 1934. As Viceroy Reading was appointed GCSI and GCIE ex officio in 1921, and in 1922 was promoted to GCVO.

As a former viceroy, Reading was critical of some of the policies of his successor Lord Irwin. On 5 November 1929 he attacked Irwin in the House of Lords for using the term "Dominion Status" with regard to India, prior to the report of the Simon Commission.

== Later life and career ==
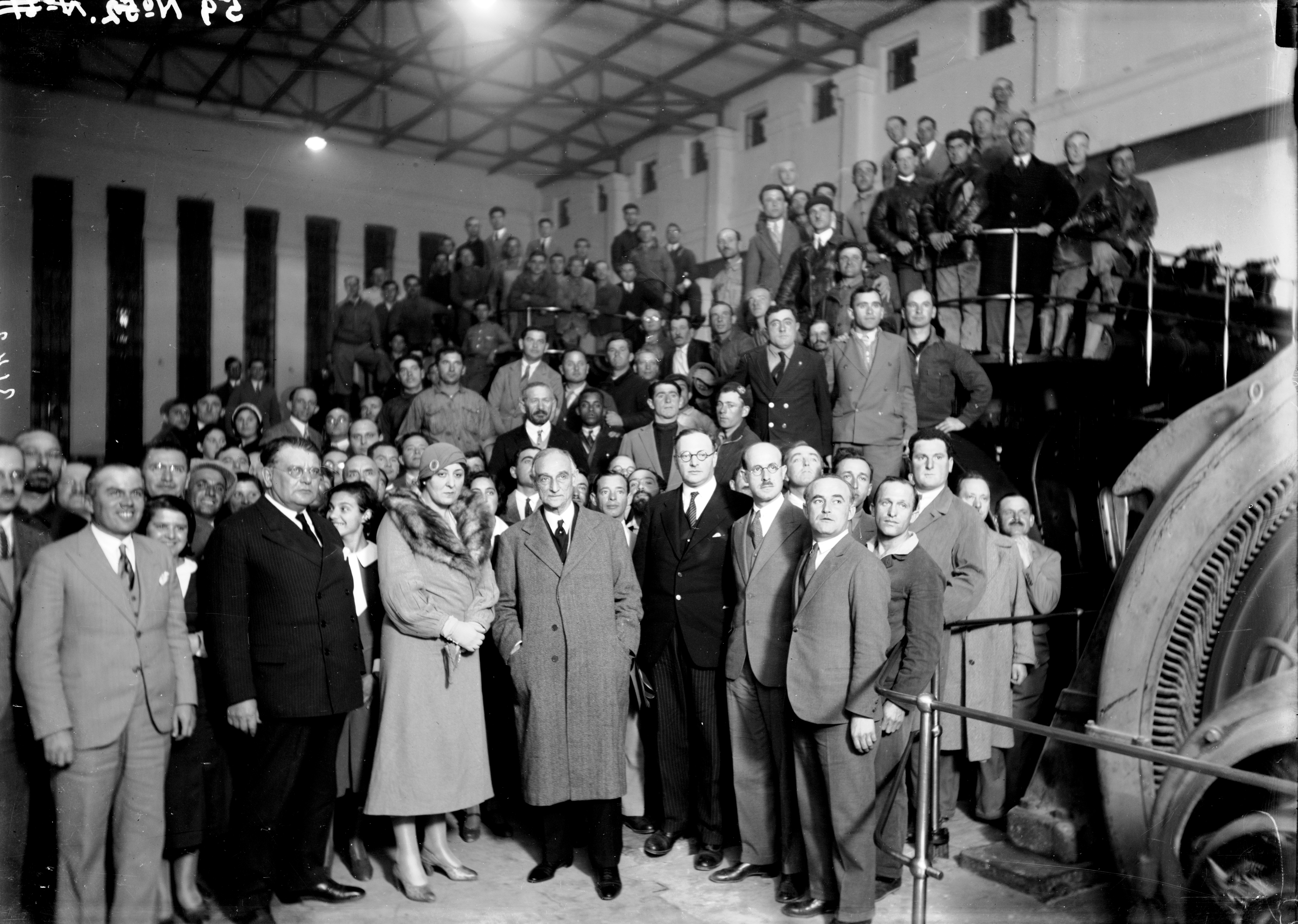
Lord Reading and his wife at Haifa Power Station, 1930s

On his return from India, Reading, who had no pension and was a heavy spender, sat on several corporate boards, and later became president of Imperial Chemical Industries. The Leader of the Liberal Party in the House of Lords from 1931 to 1935, he took part in the Round Table Conferences of 1930–32 on the future of British India as head of the Liberal delegates. He was also a member of the select committee charged with the drafting of the Government of India Act 1935.

In MacDonald's National Government in August 1931, Reading briefly served as Secretary of State for Foreign Affairs and Leader of the House of Lords, but stood down after the first major reshuffle in November due to ill-health.

He was appointed Lord Warden of the Cinque Ports in 1934.

== Marriages ==
In 1887, the young Isaacs married Alice Edith Cohen, who suffered from a chronic physical disability. Their son Gerald succeeded his father in his peerages. The first Lady Reading died of cancer in 1930, after over forty years of marriage, and the Lady Reading Hospital in Peshawar is named after her.

Reading then married secondly Stella Charnaud, his first wife's secretary. This marriage lasted until his own death in 1935. After his death, his widow was made a Dame Commander of the Order of the British Empire in 1941, promoted to Dame Grand Cross in 1944, and then in 1958 was made a life peeress as Baroness Swanborough, of Swanborough in the County of Sussex, becoming one of the first women to take a seat in the House of Lords, which she held until her death in 1971.

== Death ==
Reading died in London in December 1935, aged 75. After he was cremated at Golders Green Crematorium, his ashes were buried at the nearby Jewish Cemetery. The house where he died, No. 32 Curzon Street in Mayfair, has had a blue plaque on it since 1971.

== Honours and commemoration ==
In addition to five peerages and five knighthoods, Reading was appointed Grand Cordon of the Order of Leopold in 1925. He was Captain of Deal Castle and Lord Warden of the Cinque Ports, and was a Bencher and Treasurer of the Middle Temple.

The Lord Reading Law Society, founded in 1948 to promote the interests of Jewish members of the Quebec Bar, was named for him. He was a founding chairman of the Palestine Electric Corporation and the Reading Power Station in Tel Aviv, Israel was named for him.

== Political stands ==
Isaacs championed the taxation of land values and reforms in the legal standing of unions, education, licensing, and military organization. Isaacs also gave staunch official backing to David Lloyd George's initiative on land reform, together with his tax on land values and national social insurance scheme.

== Arms ==
Coat of arms of Rufus Isaacs, 1st Marquess of Reading
| Coronet Coronet of a marquess. Crest In front of a leopard's head couped sable, a fasces as in the arms. Escutcheon Sable, a bend between two leopards' faces or, on a chief argent a fasces fessewise proper. Supporters On either side a leopard proper, round the neck a collar or, pendant therefrom an escutcheon argent charged with a human head affrontée proper erased at the neck, ducally crowned proper. Motto Aut nunquam tentes, aut perspice (Either do not attempt, or complete). Orders The Order of the Bath (Knight Grand Cross); The Order of the Star of India (Knight Grand Commander); The Order of the Indian Empire (Knight Grand Commander); The Royal Victorian Order (Knight Grand Cross). |

== Portrayals ==
- Dominic Jephcott (2008) - The Unsinkable Titanic (TV Documentary)
- Paul McGann (2012) - Save Our Souls: The Titanic Inquiry (TV film)

Parliament of the United Kingdom
| Preceded by George William Palmer | Member of Parliament for Reading; 1904–1913 | Succeeded by Leslie Wilson |
Political offices
| Preceded by The Lord Parmoor | Leader of the House of Lords; 1931 | Succeeded by The Viscount Hailsham |
| Preceded by Arthur Henderson | Foreign Secretary; 1931 | Succeeded by Sir John Simon |
Party political offices
| Preceded by The Earl Beauchamp | Leader of the Liberals in the House of Lords; 1931–1935 | Succeeded by The Marquess of Crewe |
Legal offices
| Preceded by Sir Samuel Evans | Solicitor General; 1910 | Succeeded by Sir John Simon |
| Preceded by Sir William Robson | Attorney General; 1910–1913 | Succeeded by Sir John Simon |
| Preceded by The Lord Alverstone | Lord Chief Justice; 1913–1921 | Succeeded by The Lord Trevethin |
Government offices
| Preceded by The Lord Chelmsford | Viceroy of India; 1921–1925 | Succeeded by The Lord Irwin |
Diplomatic posts
| Preceded by Sir Cecil Spring Rice | British Ambassador to the United States; 1918–1919 | Succeeded by The Viscount Grey of Fallodon |
Honorary titles
| Preceded by The Earl Beauchamp | Lord Warden of the Cinque Ports; 1934–1935 | Succeeded by The Marquess of Willingdon |
Peerage of the United Kingdom
| New creation | Marquess of Reading; 1926–1935 | Succeeded by Gerald Isaacs |
| New creation | Earl of Reading; 1917–1935 | Succeeded by Gerald Isaacs |
| New creation | Viscount Reading; 1916–1935 | Succeeded by Gerald Isaacs |
| New creation | Baron Reading; 1914–1935 | Succeeded by Gerald Isaacs |
