= Russell baronets of Swallowfield (1812) =

Escutcheon of the Russell baronets of Swallowfield

The Russell baronetcy, of Swallowfield in the County of Berkshire, was created in the Baronetage of the United Kingdom on 10 December 1812 for Henry Russell. He was Chief Justice of Bengal and was admitted to the Privy Council in 1816. The 3rd Baronet represented Berkshire and Westminster in the House of Commons as a Conservative and was also awarded the Victoria Cross. The 4th Baronet sat as a Conservative Member of Parliament for East Berkshire. The 6th Baronet was a noted mineralogist.

The baronetcy as of 2026 is considered dormant.

== Russell baronets, of Swallowfield (1812) ==
- Sir Henry Russell, 1st Baronet (1751–1836)
- Sir Henry Russell, 2nd Baronet (1783–1852)
- Sir Charles Russell, 3rd Baronet (1826–1883)
- Sir George Russell, 4th Baronet (1828–1898)
- Sir George Arthur Charles Russell, 5th Baronet (1868–1944)
- Sir Arthur Edward Ian Montagu Russell, 6th Baronet (1878–1964)
- (Sir) George Michael Russell, 7th Baronet (1908–1993). He did not formally establish his right to the title.
- (Sir) Arthur Mervyn Russell, 8th Baronet (1923–2010). His name did not appear on the Official Roll.
- (Sir) Stephen Charles Russell, presumed 9th Baronet (born 1949).

The heir presumptive to the baronetcy is the present baronet's half-brother, Ian Mervyn Russell (born 1956).

== Notes ==
Baronetage of the United Kingdom
Preceded by Payne baronets	Russell baronets of Swallowfield; 10 December 1812	Succeeded by Baillie baronets
