= Swallowfield (disambiguation) =

Swallowfield is a village and civil parish in Berkshire, England.

Swallowfield may also refer to:

- Swallowfield Park, a stately home located near the village of Swallowfield, England
- Swallowfield, Kentucky, a community in Franklin County, Kentucky, US
