= Sir Henry Russell, 1st Baronet =

British lawyer

Sir Henry Russell, Bt PC
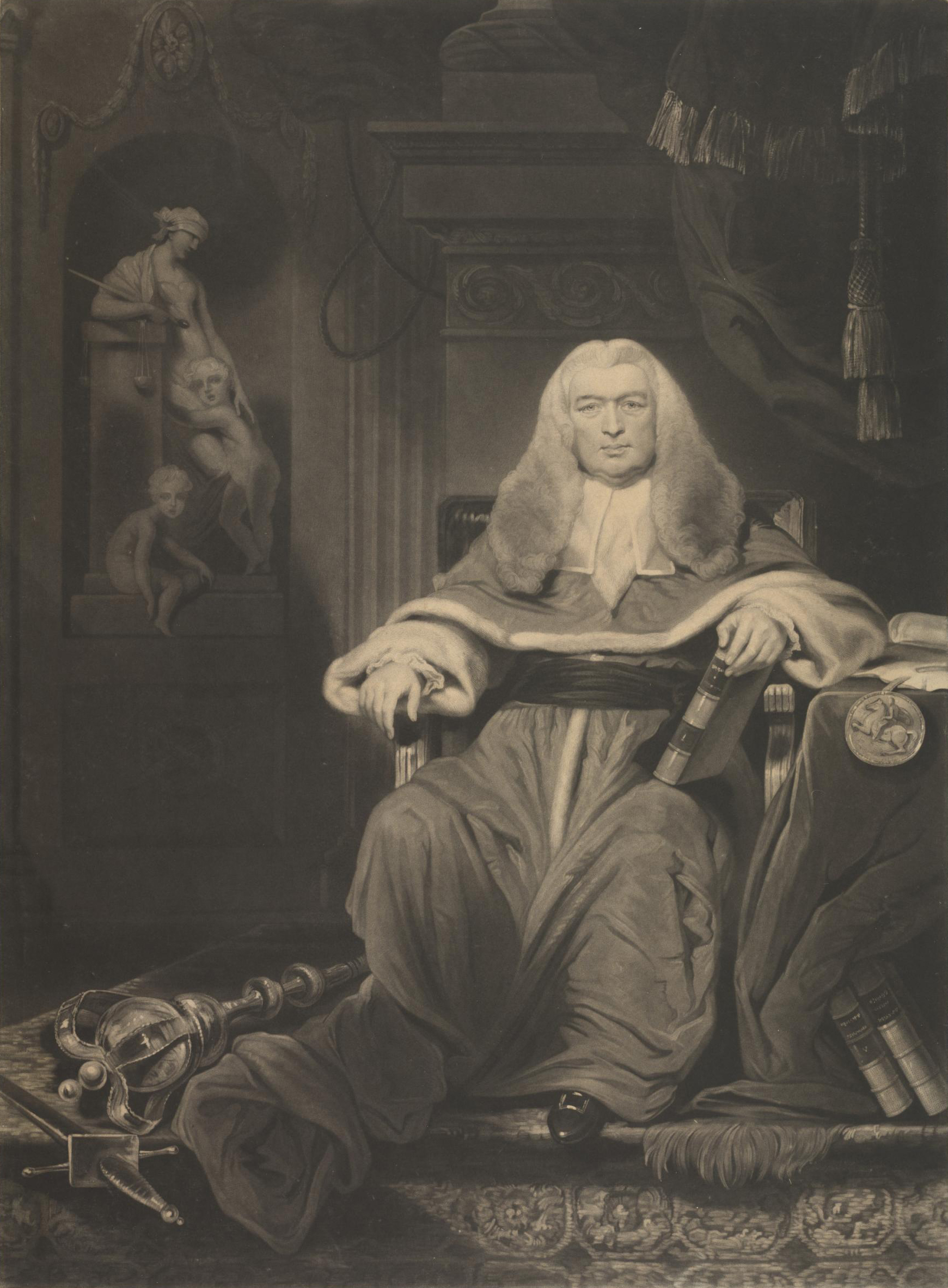
- Portrait of Sir Henry Russell

Chief Justice of Bengal
- In office 1807–1813
- Preceded by: Sir John Anstruther, Bt
- Succeeded by: Sir Edward East

Personal details
- Born: 8 August 1751 Dover, Kent, England
- Died: 18 January 1836 (aged 84) Reading, Berkshire, England
- Spouse(s): Anne Skinner (m. 1776; died 1780) Anne Barbara Whitworth (m. 1782; died 1814)
- Relations: Sir Charles Russell, 3rd Baronet (grandson); Sir George Russell, 4th Baronet (grandson)
- Children: 10, including Henry, Charles
- Parent(s): Michael Russell; Hannah Henshaw
- Education: Charterhouse School
- Alma mater: Queens' College, Cambridge

Sir Henry Russell, 1st Baronet (8 August 1751 – 18 January 1836) was a British lawyer. He was made a Privy Counsellor in 1816, during the reign of George III. The Russell baronetcy of Swallowfield in Berkshire, was created in the Baronetage of the United Kingdom on 10 December 1812 for him. Russell was the Chief Justice of Bengal.

== Early life ==
Russell was born at Dover, on 8 August 1751. He was the third son of Michael Russell (1711–1793) of Dover, by his wife Hannah Henshaw, a daughter of Henry Henshaw. Philip Yorke, 1st Earl of Hardwicke nominated him in 1763 to the foundation of the Charterhouse School, and he was educated there and at Queens' College, Cambridge, where he earned a BA degree in 1772 and an MA degree in 1775.

== Career ==
Having been admitted a member of Lincoln's Inn, 20 June 1768, he was appointed about 1775 by Lord Bathurst to a commissionership in bankruptcy; and was called to the bar on 7 July 1783. In 1797 he was appointed a puisne judge in the supreme court of judicature, Bengal, and was knighted. He reached Calcutta on 28 May 1798. In 1807 he was appointed chief justice of the supreme court in place of Sir John Anstruther. On 8 January 1808, he pronounced judgment in a case that attracted much attention at the time. John Grant, a company cadet, was found guilty of maliciously setting fire to an Indian's hut. In sentencing him to death, the chief justice said: "The natives are entitled to have their characters, property, and lives protected; and as long as they enjoy that privilege from us, they give their affection and allegiance in return". Russell's house at Calcutta stood in what was later called after him, Russell Street. Here, on 2 March 1800, his wife's niece, Rose Aylmer, died. Her memory is perpetuated in a poem of that name by Walter Savage Landor.

By patent dated 10 December 1812, Russell was made a baronet. On 9 November 1813, he resigned the chief justiceship; testimony to his merits was formally recorded in a general letter from the Bengal government to the court of directors of the East India Company, dated 7 December 1813. Russell left Calcutta two days later, and on his return to England, the Company awarded him a pension of £2,000 a year. After his retirement he declined the offer from Charles Whitworth, 1st Earl Whitworth, his brother-in-law, to take a seat in Parliament, as a member for East Grinstead, a pocket borough of the Sackville family, on the grounds that he "did not choose to be any gentleman's gentleman." On 27 June 1816, Russell was sworn a member of the privy council. In 1820, he bought Swallowfield Park, Reading, and his remaining years were mainly spent there, where he died in 1836.

== Personal life ==
On 1 August 1776, Russell married Anne Skinner, the daughter of John Skinner of Lydd, Kent. Before her death in 1780, they were the parents of:

- Henry Russell (d. 1781), who was buried with his mother Anne at Lydd, where there is a monument to her memory by Flaxman.

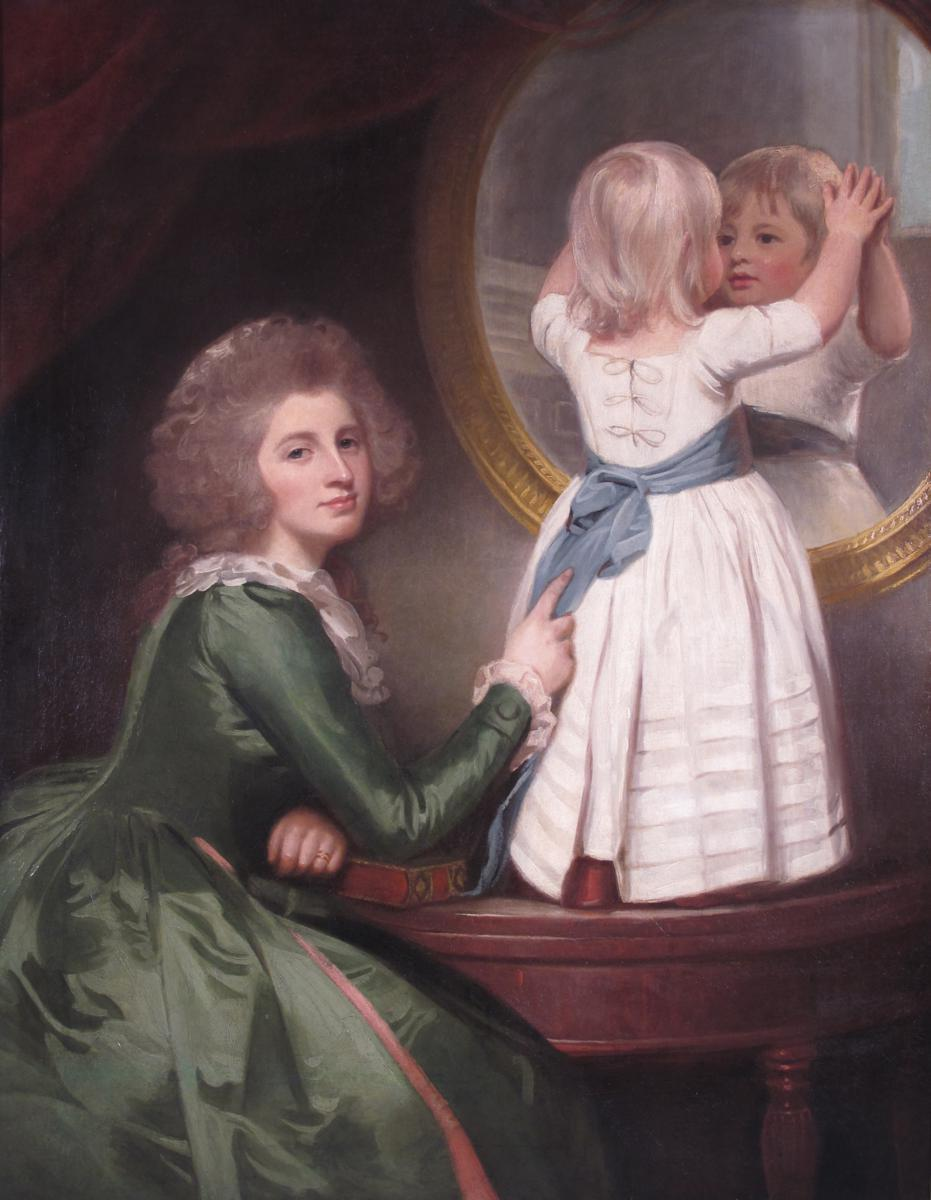
Anne Barbara Russell née Whitworth with her son Sir Henry Russell, painting by George Romney, c.1787.

Russell remarried on 23 July 1782, to Anne Barbara Whitworth (d. 1814), the fifth daughter of Sir Charles Whitworth, and sister of Charles, Earl Whitworth. Anne's niece, Rose Whitworth-Aylmer, travelled with Russel and his wife to India in 1798. While in Calcutta, she fell ill with cholera and died in 1800. She has been immortalised by Walter Savage Landor in his Rose Aylmer eulogy. Before her death on 1 August 1814, Henry and Anna had six sons (three of whom entered the East India Company's services) and five daughters, including:

- Sir Henry Russell, 2nd Baronet (1783–1852), who was British Resident to Hyderabad between 1800 and 1820, before returning to England in failing health; he married Jane Amelia Casamaijor, daughter of John Casamaijor, in 1808. After her death two months later, he married Marie Clotilde de la Fontaine, daughter of Benoît Mottet de La Fontaine, Baron fieffé de St. Corneille, in 1816.
- Charles Russell (1786–1856), MP for Reading who died unmarried.
- Francis Whitworth Russell (1790–1852), who married Jane Anne Catherine Brodie, daughter of James Brodie, in 1823.
- Whitworth Russell (1795–1847), a Reverend who married Frances Carpenter, daughter of Vice-Admiral Carpenter, in 1824.
- George Lake Russell (1801–1878), who married Lady Caroline Pery, a daughter of Edmund Pery, 1st Earl of Limerick, in 1832.
- Katherine Russell (d. 1845), who married Henry Jones.
- Caroline Russell (d. 1869), who married Commander Henry Fortescue, son of Captain Hon. Matthew Fortescue (a son of the 2nd Baron Fortescue), in 1824.
- Rose Aylmer Russell, who married Henry Porter in 1820.
- Henrietta Russell (d. 1882), who married Thomas Greene of Whittington Hall, MP for Lancaster, in 1820.

His second wife died on 1 August 1814. He died at Swallowfield Park on 18 January 1836 and was succeeded by his eldest surviving son, Henry, who lived at Swallowfield until his death on 19 April 1852.

=== Legacy ===
A monument to his memory by William Behnes exists in Swallowfield in Berkshire.

Baronetage of the United Kingdom
New creation	Baronet (of Swallowfield); 1812–1836	Succeeded by Henry Russell
