= Franco-Mauritians =

Mauritian ethnic group with ancestry in France

Total population
- 2% of the population of Mauritius

Regions with significant populations
- Mauritius, South Africa, Australia

Languages
- French, Mauritian Creole

Religion
- Majority: Catholicism

Franco-Mauritians (French: Franco-Mauriciens) form an ethnic group of White Africans of European ancestry in Mauritius who trace their ethnic ancestry to France and ethnic French people. Franco-Mauritians make up approximately 2% of the country's population. Other than documented European ancestry, it is their skin colour which distinguishes Franco-Mauritians from the rest of ethnic groups in Mauritius, where they are also known as blancs or blanches literally meaning whites.

== Origins ==
The first French settlers arrived in Mauritius (then Isle de France) in 1722, after the previous attempts of settlement by the Dutch had failed, and the island had once again become abandoned. They lived and prospered on the island, ruling it until the British invasion of 1810. The French by now strongly identified with the island, and the terms of capitulation allowed the settlers to live on as a distinct Francophone ethnic group for the next 158 years under British rule before Mauritius attained independence. By 1920 the French Mauritian population on the island was between 70,000 and 80,000, around 20% of the total population.

Not all Franco-Mauritians have pure French lineage; many also have British or other European ancestors that came to Mauritius and were absorbed in the Franco-Mauritian community or the gens de couleur (Coloureds). Within the Afro-Creole community, a significant proportion of them have some degree of French lineage.

== Demographic factors ==
Franco-Mauritians comprise 2% of the population of Mauritius and own many of the largest businesses in the country. Most Franco-Mauritians are Roman Catholic.

== Changes to political and economic dominance ==
The Franco-Mauritian group was conceptualized as a dominant minority by French political analyst Catherine Boudet. According to the researcher, the Franco-Mauritians minority sought to legitimize its dominant position and maintain its identity threatened under the challenge of decolonisation, by resorting to emigration to South Africa. The designation of the group as « Franco-Mauritian » indicates a plurality of social meanings and reveals the ambivalent positioning of the group within the multiethnic society of Mauritius after the shattering of the colonial order by independence. Dominant ethnicity in Mauritius traces its roots in the system of slavery of the 18th century which conferred to the minority of French descent a structural dominant position based on race in the colonial society. The economic and political hegemony of the group was further strengthened by its acquisition of the monopoly over the sugar industry throughout the 19th century. As a French colony until the early 1800s the application of the decree Code Noir on the island limited activities of free people of color, forced conversion of slaves to Catholicism, and it defined the various forms of punishments meted out by Franco-Mauritians. However, group identification shifted from a racially-based to an ethnically based following the massive introduction of Indian immigrants. The Franco-Mauritian domination was eventually challenged by the rise of economic and political elites within the other groups of the Mauritian plural society, and by the independence granted in 1968 when the political power went to the Hindu majority. Emigration to South Africa then appeared as the ultimate strategy for many Franco-Mauritians to allow them retain their dominant position and identity.

== Notable people ==
- Angry Anderson, rock singer-songwriter, television presenter-reporter and actor
- Heather Arseth, swimmer, represented Mauritius at 2012 and 2016 Summer Olympics
- Claude de Baissac
- Lise de Baissac
- Joanna Bérenger, politician
- Paul Bérenger, Deputy Prime Minister of Mauritius
- Benoit Bouchet, windsurfer
- Havana Brown, Mauritian-Australian DJ, singer, recording artist, record producer, songwriter and dancer
- Antoine Toussaint de Chazal, plantation owner and artist
- Enzo Couacaud, Mauritian-born French Tennis Player
- Adrien d'Épinay, politician and slave-owner
- Prosper d'Épinay, sculptor and caricaturist
- Rémi Feuillet, judoka
- Laurina Fleure, Australian Model and TV Personality
- Andrew Florent, Australian tennis player
- Oliver Florent, Australian rules footballer
- Firoz Ghanty, painter, poet, and activist
- Marinne Giraud, tennis player
- Gavin Glover, lawyer and politician
- Genevieve Gregson, Australian Athlete
- Éric Guimbeau, politician, sugar and tea magnate
- Aurelie Halbwachs, cyclist, represented Mauritius at 2008 and 2012 Summer Olympics
- Camille Koenig, swimmer
- Marie Leblanc, writer
- Corinne Leclair, swimmer, represented Mauritius at 1992 Summer Olympics
- J. M. G. Le Clézio, author, awarded the 2008 Nobel Prize in Literature
- Suzanne Leclézio, WW II resistance fighter, nurse, Knight of the Legion of Honour, Croix de Guerre, and Resistance Medal
- Chad le Clos, swimmer, representing South Africa
- Kimberley Le Court, International Cyclist representing Mauritius
- Yannick Lincoln, cyclist
- Francoise Lionnet, professor
- Amédée Maingard, war hero, politician and businessman
- Alfred de Marigny, author
- Jean-Paul de Marigny, footballer, Football Manager, former Socceroo
- Priscilla Morand, judoka
- Virgile Naz, lawyer and politician
- Françoise Pascal, actress, singer, dancer, fashion model, and producer
- Marie-Hélène Pierre, badminton player
- Charles Thomi Pitot, politician
- Pierre De Sornay, writer
- Auguste Toussaint, archivist and author
- Joseph Désiré Tholozan, Nasseredin Shah's personal physician, pioneer in epidemiology
- Alix d'Unienville, spy, war hero and author
- Veronique Marrier D'Unienville, archer, represented Mauritius at 2008 Summer Olympics

== See also ==
- Mauritian of Indian origin
- Mauritian of African origin
- Mauritian of Chinese origin
- White Africans of European ancestry
