= Benoît Mottet de La Fontaine =

French officer

- Born: 4 July 1745; Château de Compiègne
- Died: 30 April 1820 (aged 74); Pondicherry
- Spouse: Marie Marguarite Villon de Fécamp (m. 1787; died 1820)
- Parent(s): Claude Nicolas Motte; Madeleine Coustant de Belle-Assise
- Relatives: Agathe de Rambaud (niece); Sir Charles Russell, 3rd Baronet (grandson); Sir George Russell, 4th Baronet (grandson)

Benoît Mottet de La Fontaine (Note: Benoît Mottet de La Fontaine, Baron fieffé de Saint-Corneille, Seigneur de la Fontaine, in Picardy.) (4 July 1745 – 30 April 1820) was a French officier de plume of the Ministry of the Navy and Colonies and was a colonial administrator in French India.

== Early life ==
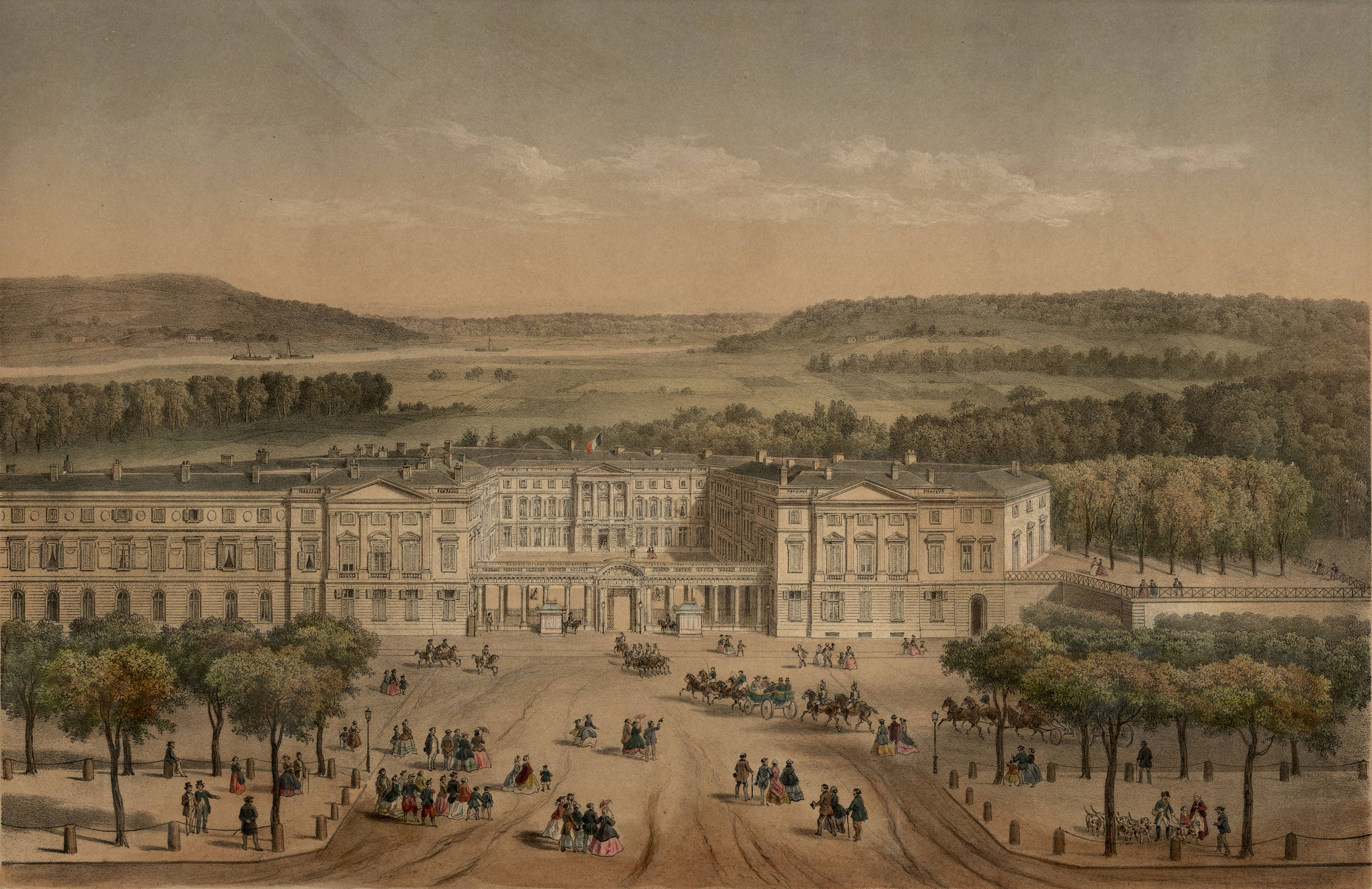
Château de Compiègne in the 19th century

Mottet was born on 4 July 1745 at the Château de Compiègne in Compiègne. He was a younger son of Madeleine Coustant de Belle-Assise (1705–1771) and Claude Nicolas Mottet (1693–1768), a lawyer in Parlement who was an officer in the King's Venery.

His paternal grandparents were Louis Mottet and Marguerite Herlaut. Through his brother Louis-Melchior Mottet, he was an uncle of Agathe de Rambaud, the official nurse of the royal children who was in charge of the Dauphin from 1785 to 1792. His maternal grandparents were Marie-Barbe de More and Charles Coustant de Belle-Assise, who was the Governor of Compiègne.

== Career ==
After training at the Commissariat de la Marine, Mottet was sent by the French East India Company as commissioner to Chandannagar to revitalize trade after the war, but was soon replaced by Dehaies de Montigny.

In 1789, Mottet was made the King's authorizing Commissioner and President of the Superior Council of Pondicherry. As commissioner, he was responsible for all civil administration, including finance, commerce, navigation, police and justice of the colony. In 1793, he became the Ordinator of Pondicherry.

=== British control ===
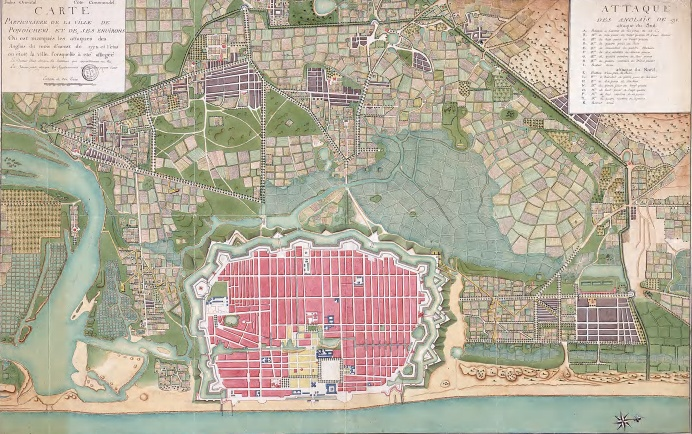
Defences of Pondicherry, 1778

From 1 June 1793, English vessels blocked communications by sea. By 11 July 1793, the English Army infiltrated Pondicherry and power was transferred to the English Commander on Madras. Mottet and his family chose to stay in Pondicherry, fearing being victims of the Reign of Terror in mainland France during the French Revolution. Following the Treaty of Amiens in 1802, Mottet, remained president of the Council of Pondicherry during twenty-three years of English occupation.

=== French control ===
On 4 December 1816, the English administration officially returned Pondicherry to France, thus respecting the terms of the Treaty of Paris of 30 May 1814 (which ended the war between France and the Sixth Coalition, part of the Napoleonic Wars), confirmed by the second Treaty of Paris on 30 November 1815.

Mottet was made Commissioner for all French establishments in India and president of the Superior Council in Pondicherry, but for only a few weeks as he retired on 1 January 1817. He was a deputy of the Grand Orient de France and received the Order of Saint-Louis on 7 October 1820.

== Personal life ==
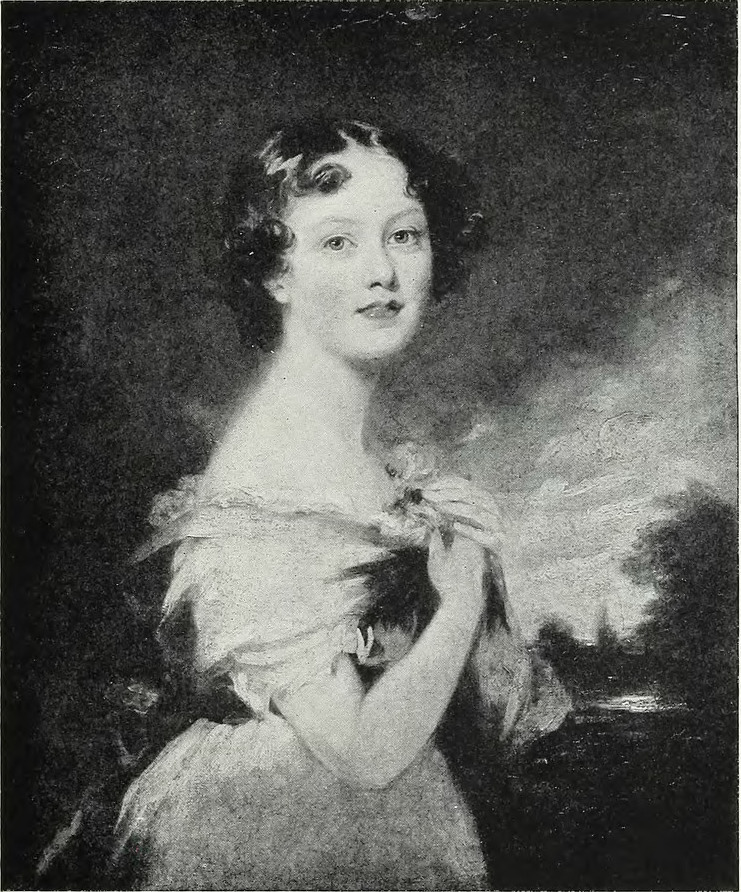
Portrait of his daughter, Marie Clotilde de la Fontaine, by Sir Thomas Lawrence

On 27 May 1787, Mottet was married to Marie Marguarite Villon de Fécamp (1761–1827), the daughter of Marie de Solmiac and Louis Victor Villon, marquis de Fécamp, and the niece of Camille Charles Leclerc, Chevalier de Fresne, Gouverneur Général de l'Inde française from 1789 to 1792. Together, they were the parents of:

- Victorine Mottet de la Fontaine (1790–1868), who married Lt.-Gen. Sir John Doveton, a British military officer in the East India Company's Madras Army, in 1808.
- Edouard Prosper Laurent Mottet de La Fontaine (1793–1875), who married Georgia Honoria Fallowfield in 1828.
- Marie Clotilde Mottet de la Fontaine (1794–1872), who married in 1816, as his second wife, Sir Henry Russell, 2nd Baronet, the British British Resident to the court of Pune in 1809 and to the Court of Hyderabad State from 1810 until 1820. Russell was the son of Sir Henry Russell, 1st Baronet and the nephew of Charles Whitworth, 1st Earl Whitworth.
- Mary Virginie Mottet de la Fontaine (1794–1845), who married George Chaplin Holroyd, son of Sir George Sowley Holroyd, a justice of the King's Bench, in 1818.
- Adolphe Guillaume Mottet de La Fontaine (1795–1884), who married Marie Élisabeth de Warren, a daughter of Count Jean Baptiste François Joseph de Warren, in 1829.

He died on 30 April 1820 at Rue des Capucins, Pondicherry. On his death he was buried in the French cemetery on rue Surcouf in Pondicherry.

=== Descendants ===
Through his daughter Marie, he was a grandfather of Mary Russell (wife of Dawson Cornelius Greene, a son of Thomas Greene MP of Whittington Hall), Sir Charles Russell, 3rd Baronet (1826–1883), Sir George Russell, 4th Baronet (1828–1898), a barrister who married Constance Lennox (daughter of Lt.-Col. Lord Arthur Lennox and granddaughter of the 4th Duke of Richmond) and Priscilla Russell (1830–1924).

Through his son Adolphe, he was a grandfather of Victor Mottet de La Fontaine (b. 1835), Adolphine Clotilde Mottet de La Fontaine (1837–1919), Marie Mathilde Joséphine Mottet de La Fontaine (1837–1929), and Claire Mottet de La Fontaine (1844–1936), who married French sculptor Prosper d'Epinay (son of colonial politician Adrien d'Épinay).
