= Sir Arthur Russell, 6th Baronet =

British mineralogist (1878-1964)

Sir Arthur Russell Bt MBE FRS

Personal details
- Born: Arthur Edward Ian Montague Russell; 30 November 1878 Swallowfield Park, Swallowfield, Berkshire, England
- Died: 24 February 1964 (aged 85)
- Parent: Sir George Russell (father)
- Education: Eton College, King's College London
- Occupation: Mineralogist

Sir Arthur Edward Ian Montague Russell, 6th Baronet (30 November 1878 – 24 February 1964) was a British mineralogist. He was a collector and a collector of collections.

== Biography ==
He was born in Swallowfield Park, near Reading, in Berkshire, the son of Sir George Russell, 4th Baronet and Lady Constance Charlotte Elisa Lennox. He was educated at Eton College and studied chemistry at King's College London. He served in France during World War I and was invalided home in 1915. He was appointed a Member of Order of the British Empire (MBE) in 1920 and succeeded as 6th Baronet upon the death of his older brother in 1944.

In his lifetime, he amassed huge collections, including those of Philip Rashleigh (1728–1811), Lady Elizabeth Coxe Hippisley (1760–1843), John Hawkins (1761–1841), John Hamrease (1764–1811), George Croker Fox (1784–1850), Edmund Pearse (1788–1856), Robert Were Fox (1789–1877), Isaac Walker (1790–1853), Alfred Fox (1794–1874), Sir Maziere Brady (1796–1871), Baroness Burdett-Coutts (1814–1906), Sir Warington Wilkinson Smyth (1817–1890), John Ruskin (1819–1900), Col. R. B. Rimington (1828–1910), Arthur Champernowne (1839–1887), J. H. Collins (1841–1916), W. Semmons (1841–1915) and Samuel Henson (1848–1930).

The Russell Collection at Swallowfield Park became famous throughout the world and was visited by mineralogists and collectors from across Europe and America. The collection of about 12,000 of the finest British minerals is now in the Mineralogical Collection of the Natural History Museum.

He married, in 1904, Aileen Kerr Pechell (ca. 1879-1920), daughter of Admiral Mark Robert Pechell. They had two children, including George Michael Russell who succeeded as baronet.

== Honours and awards ==
- President of the British Mineralogical Society from 1939 to 1942.
- Bolitho Medal from Royal Geological Society of Cornwall in 1948.
- Henwood Medal from the Royal Institution of Cornwall in 1953.
- Honorary Doctor of Science degree from the University of Oxford in 1956.
- He described and named the new species rashleighite.
- Was honoured by the naming of the minerals russellite and arthurite.

The Russell Society for amateur and professional mineralogists is named in his honour.

Baronetage of the United Kingdom
Preceded by George Arthur Charles Russell	Baronet (of Swallowfield); 1944–1964	Succeeded by George Michael Russell
