= Sir Henry Russell, 2nd Baronet =

English diplomat and landowner

Sir Henry Russell, Bt
- Born: 27 May 1783; Dover, Kent, England
- Died: 19 April 1852 (aged 68); Swallowfield Park
- Occupation: Diplomat
- Spouses: Jane Casamajor (m. 1808; died 1808) Marie Clotilde de la Fontaine (m. 1816; died 1852)
- Children: 7, including Charles, George
- Parent(s): Sir Henry Russell, 1st Baronet; Anne Barbara Whitworth
- Relatives: Sir Charles Whitworth (grandfather); Charles Whitworth, 1st Earl Whitworth (uncle)

Sir Henry Russell, 2nd Baronet (27 May 1783 – 19 April 1852), was an English diplomat of the East India Company and landowner.

== Early life ==
Russell was born on 27 May 1783. He was the eldest surviving son of Sir Henry Russell, 1st Baronet, and his second wife, Anne Barbara Whitworth (1763–1814). Among his siblings were Charles Russell (MP for Reading), Francis Whitworth Russell (who married Jane Anne Catherine Brodie), the Rev. Whitworth Russell (who married Frances Carpenter), George Lake Russell (who married Lady Caroline Pery, a daughter of the 1st Earl of Limerick), and Henrietta Russell (who married Thomas Greene of Whittington Hall).

His paternal grandparents were Michael Russell of Dover, and the former Hannah Henshaw (a daughter of Henry Henshaw). His mother was the fifth daughter of Sir Charles Whitworth, and his maternal uncle was Charles Whitworth, 1st Earl Whitworth.

== Career ==
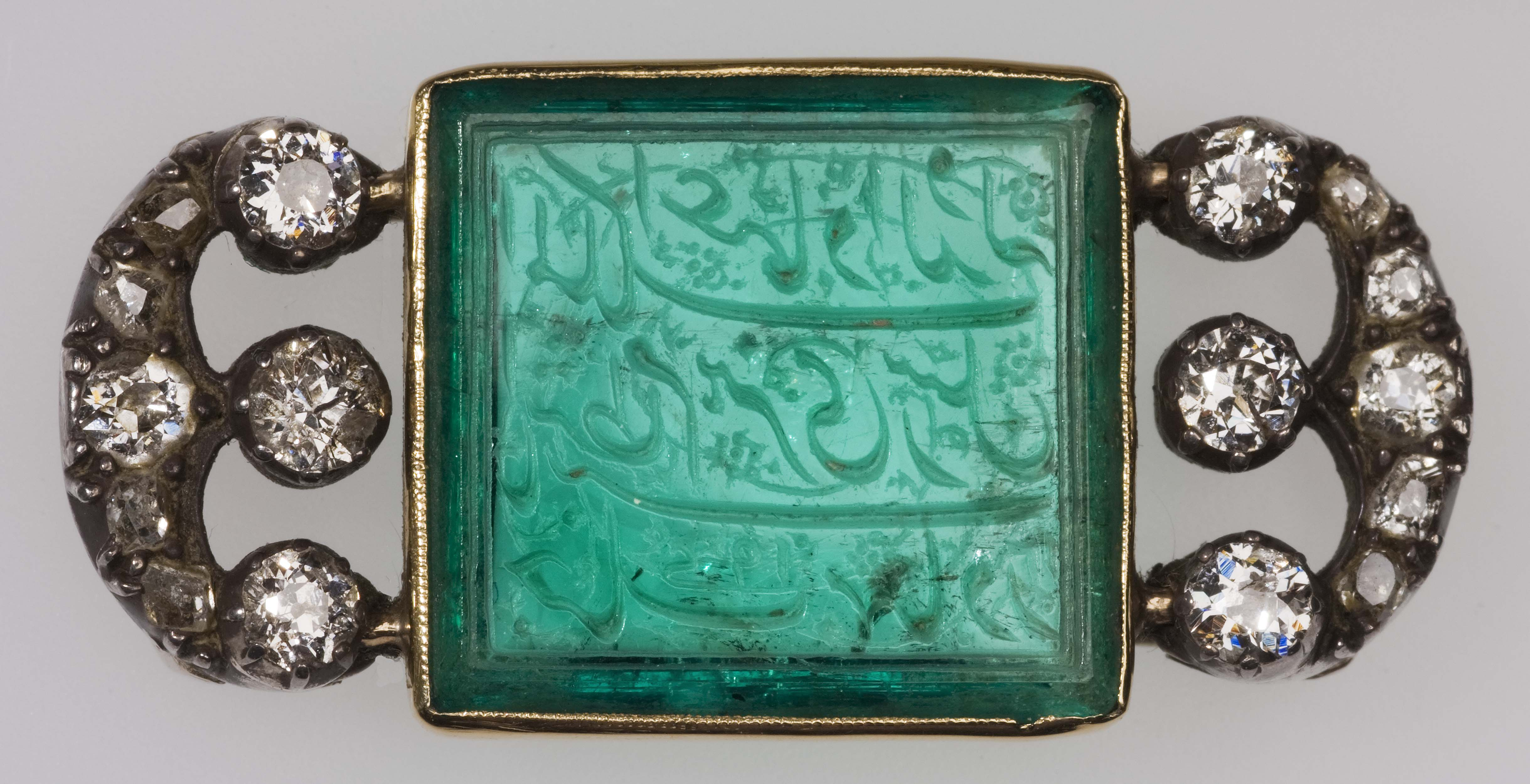
Seal of Henry Russell made out of two parts, with the seal itself having been created in Hyderabad in 1804/5, whereas the clasp was made in the mid-19th century in Europe, probably Britain. Russell received the emerald seal while at Hyderabad. The three-line inscription in nastaliq script reads: Intizam al-Mulk I'timad al-Dawlah Henry Russell Na'ib Jang Bahadur 1219 ('The valiant, the Administrator of the Kingdom, the Pillar of the State, Henry Russell, deputy Commander-in-chief, 1219 [1804–5 AD]')

Russell was Private Secretary and assistant to James Achilles Kirkpatrick, British Resident to the court of the Nizam of Hyderabad and Berar from 1798 until Kirkpatrick's death in 1805. Russell's career is discussed in some detail in William Dalrymple's 2002 history of British India, White Mughals, where he figures as a gifted but weak diplomat. Russell seduced Kirkpatrick's widow, the Hyderabadi noblewoman Khair-un-Nissa, but abandoned her after a brief affair. He was subsequently appointed a Resident in his own right to the court of the Peshwa at Pune in 1809, and was promoted the following year to Kirkpatrick's old Residency in Hyderabad, serving from 1810 until 1820, when he resigned to avert an investigation for corruption which would have led to his removal from office in disgrace. On an annual salary of £3,400, he had managed to accumulate a fortune of £85,000 over 10 years. In retirement he lived first at Sutton Park in Bedfordshire, then at Southernhay House, an architecturally notable listed building in Exeter. It was a newly built, freestanding, classical mansion of pillared grandeur.

In 1820 the Russell family, including his father, the 1st Baronet, and his two most successful sons, Charles and Sir Henry (later the 2nd Baronet), pooled their resources and purchased Swallowfield Park, near Reading, Berkshire, where they and their descendants remained for over 150 years.

== Personal life ==
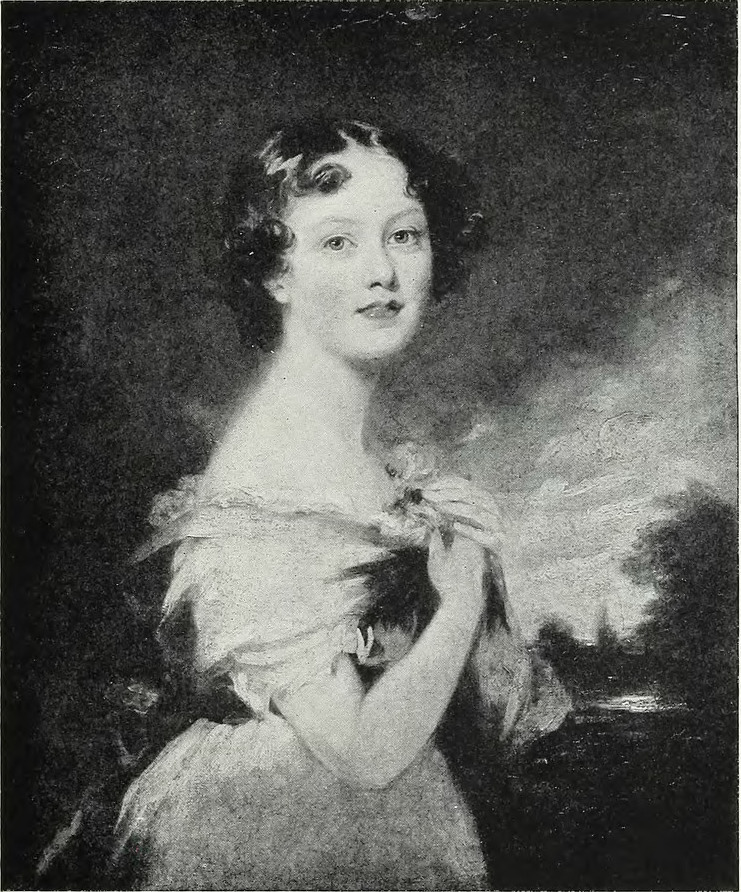
Portrait of his second wife, Marie Clotilde Mottet de la Fontaine, by Sir Thomas Lawrence

In October 1808 Russell married Jane Amelia Casamajor, a daughter of John Casamaijor, in Madras. Jane died suddenly just two months after they were married.

On 13 November 1816, he married Marie Clotilde Mottet de la Fontaine (1793–1872), a French Catholic who was the daughter of Benoît Mottet de La Fontaine, Baron fieffé de Saint Corneille, the last French Governor of Pondicherry. Her first cousin was Agathe de Rambaud, the official nurse of the royal children, and particularly was in charge of the Dauphin from 1785 to 1792. Together, they were the parents of six children:

- Henry Russell (1819–1847), who died unmarried in Cairo.
- Anne Russell (1820–1902), who died unmarried at Swallowfield Park.
- Mary Russell (1822–1894), who married her cousin, Dawson Cornelius Greene, a son of Thomas Greene MP of Whittington Hall, in 1856.
- Sir Charles Russell, 3rd Baronet (1826–1883), a politician and early recipient of the Victoria Cross who never married.
- Sir George Russell, 4th Baronet (1828–1898), who became a barrister and recorder; he married Constance Lennox, a daughter of Lt.-Col. Lord Arthur Lennox and (son of the 4th Duke of Richmond), in 1867.
- Priscilla Russell (1830–1924), who married Consul to Lisbon George Brackenbury, son of Rev. Joseph Brackenbury, in 1865.

Sir Henry died at Swallowfield on 19 April 1852, and was succeeded by his eldest surviving son, Charles. After Charles died unmarried in 1883, the baronetcy passed to Sir Henry's next surviving son, George.

=== Illegitimate daughter ===
After the death of his first wife and before his marriage to his second, Russell had a liaison with a local lady which resulted in the birth of his daughter, who he named Mary Wilson in 1815. This child was brought to England when he retired, and was brought up in complete secrecy, with Sir Henry's friend, Major Robert Pitman, acting as a go-between. He provided an allowance for her, but refused to let Major Pitman tell her the identity of her father. Mary married the Reverend William Langston Coxhead in 1839, who was incumbent of Kirby le Soken, Essex.

Baronetage of the United Kingdom
Preceded by Henry Russell	Baronet (of Swallowfield); 1836–1852	Succeeded by Charles Russell
