= Russellite =

Russellite may refer to:

- Russellite (mineral)
- Russellite Unionist
- Bible Student movement, Christian groups which emerged from teachings of Charles Taze Russell (1852–1916)
