= Stanford End Mill and River Loddon =

Protected area in Berkshire, England

- Site of Special Scientific Interest
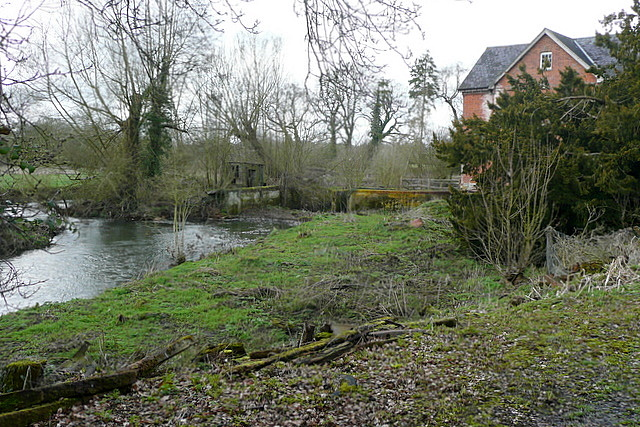

- Location within Berkshire
- Location of Stanford End Mill and River Loddon.
- Area of search: Berkshire
- Grid reference: SU 706 634
- Coordinates: 51.365°N 0.987°W
- Interest: Biological
- Area: 11.8 hectares (29 acres)
- Notification date: 1987
- Location map: Magic Map

Stanford End Mill and River Loddon is a 11.8-hectare (29-acre) biological Site of Special Scientific Interest south of Reading in Berkshire. It covers Stanford End Mill meadows and a 4 kilometres (2.5 miles) stretch of the River Loddon between Stanford End and Sheep Bridge north-west of Swallowfield.

The mill was built in early Victorian times on the Stratfield Saye estate.

== Fauna ==
The site has the following animals

=== Mammals ===
- European water vole

=== Birds ===
- Little grebe
- Moorhen
- Coot
- Mute swan
- Common kingfisher

=== Invertebrates ===
- Pisidium moitessierianum
- Pisidium tenuilineatum
- Vertigo antivertigo
- Vertigo moulinsiana

== Flora ==
The site has the following Flora:

=== Trees ===
- Alder
- Salix alba
- Fraxinus
- Quercus robur

=== Plants ===
- Fritillaria meleagris
- Potamogeton nodosus
- Alopecurus pratensis
- Holcus lanatus
- Ranunculus acris
- Rumex acetosa
- Plantago lanceolata
- Centaurea nigra
- Rhinanthus minor
- Silaum silaus
- Ophioglossum vulgatum
- Carex disticha
- Carex panicea
- Cardamine pratensis
- Lychnis flos-cuculi
- Oenanthe fistulosa
- Potamogeton pectinatus
- Nuphar lutea
- Sagitarria sagittifolia
- Schoenoplectus lacustris
- Sparganium erectum
- Epilobium hirsutum
- Eupatorium cannabinum
- Symphytum officinale
- Lythrum salicaria
- Filipendula ulmaria
- Petasites hybridus
- Myosotis scorpioides
- Myosoton aquaticum
- Nasturtium officinale
- Urtica dioica
- Dipsacus fullonum
