= Baillie baronets of Portman Square (1812) =

Escutcheon of the Baillie baronets of Portman Square

The Baillie baronetcy, of Portman Square in the County of London, was created in the Baronetage of the United Kingdom on 11 December 1812 for Ewen Baillie, of the Bengal Army. He obtained a new patent on 26 May 1819, for the seat Berkeley Square; with special remainder in default of male issue of his own to his nephew and the male issue of his body. The 1812 creation became extinct on his death in 1820, while the 1819 creation was passed on to his nephew Alexander Mackenzie, the 2nd Baronet. He was the son of Roderick Mackenzie and his wife, the half-sister of the 1st Baronet. Mackenzie was also a General in the British Army. He was childless and the 1819 creation became extinct on his death in 1853.

== Baillie, later Mackenzie baronets, of Berkeley Square (1819) ==
- Sir Ewen Baillie, 1st Baronet (died 1820)
- Sir Alexander Mackenzie, 2nd Baronet (c. 1771–1853)

== Notes ==
Baronetage of the United Kingdom
Preceded by Russell baronets	Baillie baronets of Portman Square; 11 December 1812	Succeeded by Hunter baronets
Preceded by Innes baronets	Baillie baronets (2nd patent) of Portman Square; 26 May 1819	Succeeded by Allan baronets
