= Anthony Palmer (VC) =

English soldier (1819–1892); recipient of the Victoria Cross

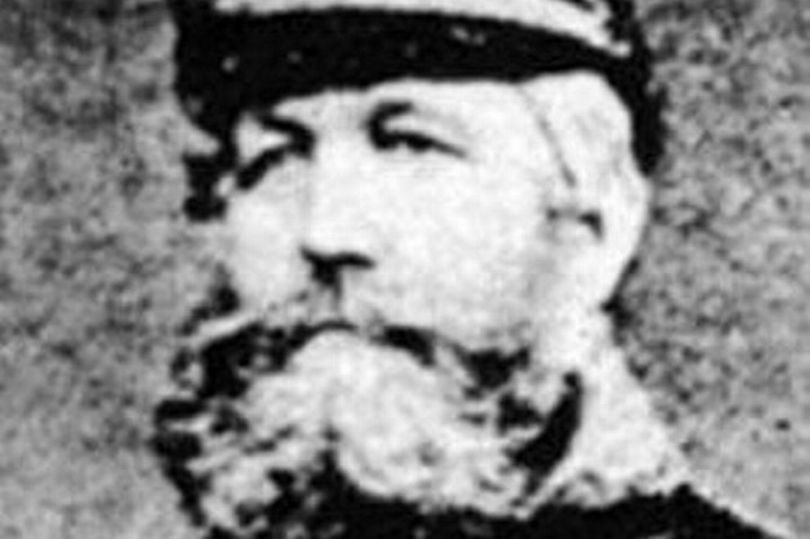
- Born: 10 March 1819; Brereton Green, Sandbach, Cheshire
- Died: 12 December 1892 (aged 73); Crumpsall Hospital, Crumpsall, Manchester
- Burial place: Heywood Cemetery, Rochdale
- Military career
- Allegiance: United Kingdom
- Branch: British Army
- Service years: 1838–1863
- Rank: Private (Later Captain of Volunteers)
- Unit: Grenadier Guards
- Conflicts: Crimean War
- Awards: Victoria Cross; Bentinck Medal for Gallantry

Anthony Palmer VC (10 March 1819 – 12 December 1892) was an English recipient of the Victoria Cross, the highest and most prestigious award for gallantry in the face of the enemy that can be awarded to British and Commonwealth forces.

== Career ==
=== Grenadier Guards ===
Palmer was about 35 years old, and a private in the 3rd Battalion, Grenadier Guards, British Army during the Crimean War when the following deed took place for which he was awarded the VC.

On 5 November 1854 at the Battle of Inkerman, Crimea, Private Palmer, with two other men were the first to volunteer to go with Brevet Major Sir Charles Russell to dislodge a party of Russians from the Sandbag Battery. The attack succeeded. During this action Private Palmer shot down an assailant who was in the act of bayoneting Russell, and so saved his life. He was also one of a small band which, by a desperate charge against overwhelming numbers, saved the Colours of the battalion from capture.

=== 5th (Plaistow and Victoria Docks) Essex Rifle Volunteer Corps ===
In 1874, Palmer was commissioned as a captain in the part-time 5th (Plaistow and Victoria Docks) Essex Rifle Volunteer Corps.

== Victoria Cross on display ==
Palmer's Victoria Cross is displayed at The Guards Regimental Headquarters (Grenadier Guards RHQ), Wellington Barracks, London, England.

== Notes ==
https://www.rochdale.gov.uk/armed-forces-community/victoria-cross-recipients-rochdale
