= Charles Thomi Pitot =

Franco-Mauritian lawyer and politician (1779–1821)

Charles-Thomi Pitot de la Beaujardière (7 November 1779 – 25 May 1821), most commonly known as Charles Thomi Pitot was a Franco-Mauritian lawyer and politician.

== Biography ==
Charles Thomi Pitot was educated in Paris with brother Édouard under the supervision of Famille Robert de la Mennais. The two brothers returned to Isle de France (Mauritius) in 1798 and helped their uncle Charles to consolidate his business.

When Matthew Flinders was under house arrest in Mauritius from 1803 to 1810 he befriended Charles Thomi Pitot. In 1805, as a plantation owner, he defended the colonial slave system.

Under the governorship of French General Decaen Thomi Pitot was nominated to form part of the island's Conseil Colonial.

When the island came under British rule Governor Farquhar created the Conseil de Commune on 8 September 1817 and he nominated C.T. Pitot as its Secretary. Due to a number of disagreements with the British Governor the Conseil de Commune was suspended twice. The Franco-Mauritian plantation owners delegated Charles Thomi Pitot with the task of escalating their grievances to King George IV of England. However Pitot died before being able to travel to Europe. Due to his collaborative approach he was dubbed the Béranger de l'île Maurice. His successor at the council was Adrien d'Épinay.
