= Claudius Hunter =

Lord Mayor of London

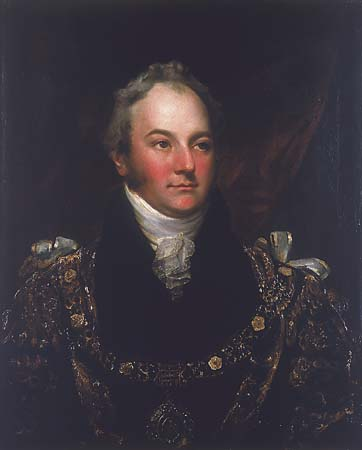
Claudius Stephen Hunter, Lord Mayor of London.

Sir Claudius Stephen Hunter, 1st Baronet (24 February 1775 – 20 April 1851), lawyer and Lord Mayor of London.

== Biography ==
Hunter, who was born at Beech Hill, near Reading, 24 February 1775, was the youngest son of Henry Hunter (1739–1789) of Beech Hill, Berkshire, a barrister, by Mary, third daughter of William Sloane, the great-nephew of Sir Hans Sloane, bart. His sister Mary (d. 1847) was the second wife of William Manning, M.P. for Lymington, and was thus mother of Cardinal Manning.

He was educated at Newcome's school in Hackney, and afterwards by a Protestant clergyman in Switzerland. He entered as a student of the Inner Temple, but was subsequently articled for five years to Beardsworth, Burley, & Moore, solicitors, of Lincoln's Inn. He commenced business in 1797 as a solicitor in Lincoln's Inn, in partnership with George Richards. A wealthy marriage in the same year proved of assistance, and his practice grew very large.

He was solicitor to the commercial commissioners under the income duty acts, the London Dock Company, the Royal Institution, the Society for the Promotion of Religion and Virtue and Suppression of Vice, the Linnean Society, and the Royal Exchange Assurance Company. In September 1804 he was chosen alderman of the ward of Bassishaw, and then relinquished the general management of his business to his partner. Two years afterwards he was appointed Lieutenant-Colonel of the Royal East London Militia (becoming Colonel on 10 January 1810), and devoted much time to his regiment, which was occasionally called upon to serve at a distance from the metropolis. In June 1808 he was elected Sheriff of London.

He retired from business as a solicitor on 11 January 1811, and was called to the bar. On 9 November 1811 he became lord mayor of the city of London, when he revived all the ancient ceremonies worthy of renewal, and his pageant was exceptionally magnificent. He was created a baronet on 11 December 1812 and made an honorary D.C.L. of the university of Oxford 23 June 1819. In 1835 he removed from the ward of Bassishaw to that of Bridge Without, and at the time of his death was the 'father of the city.'

He died at Mortimer Hill, Reading, Berkshire, 20 April 1851. His first wife, whom he married 15 July 1797, Penelope Maria, only daughter of James Free, having died in 1840, he married again, on 25 October 1841, Janet, second daughter of James Fenton of Hampstead; she died at Cambridge Terrace, Hyde Park, 21 January 1859. By his first wife he had two sons and a daughter. His elder son John (1798–1842) left a son, Claudius Stephen Paul, who succeeded his grandfather in the baronetcy.

Honorary titles
Preceded by Joshua Smith	Lord Mayor of London; 1811–1812	Succeeded by George Scholey
Baronetage of the United Kingdom
New creation	Baronet (of London); 1812–1851	Succeeded by Claudius Hunter
