= Swallowfield Meadow =

Nature reserve in Berkshire, England

Coordinates: 51°22′37″N 0°57′26″W

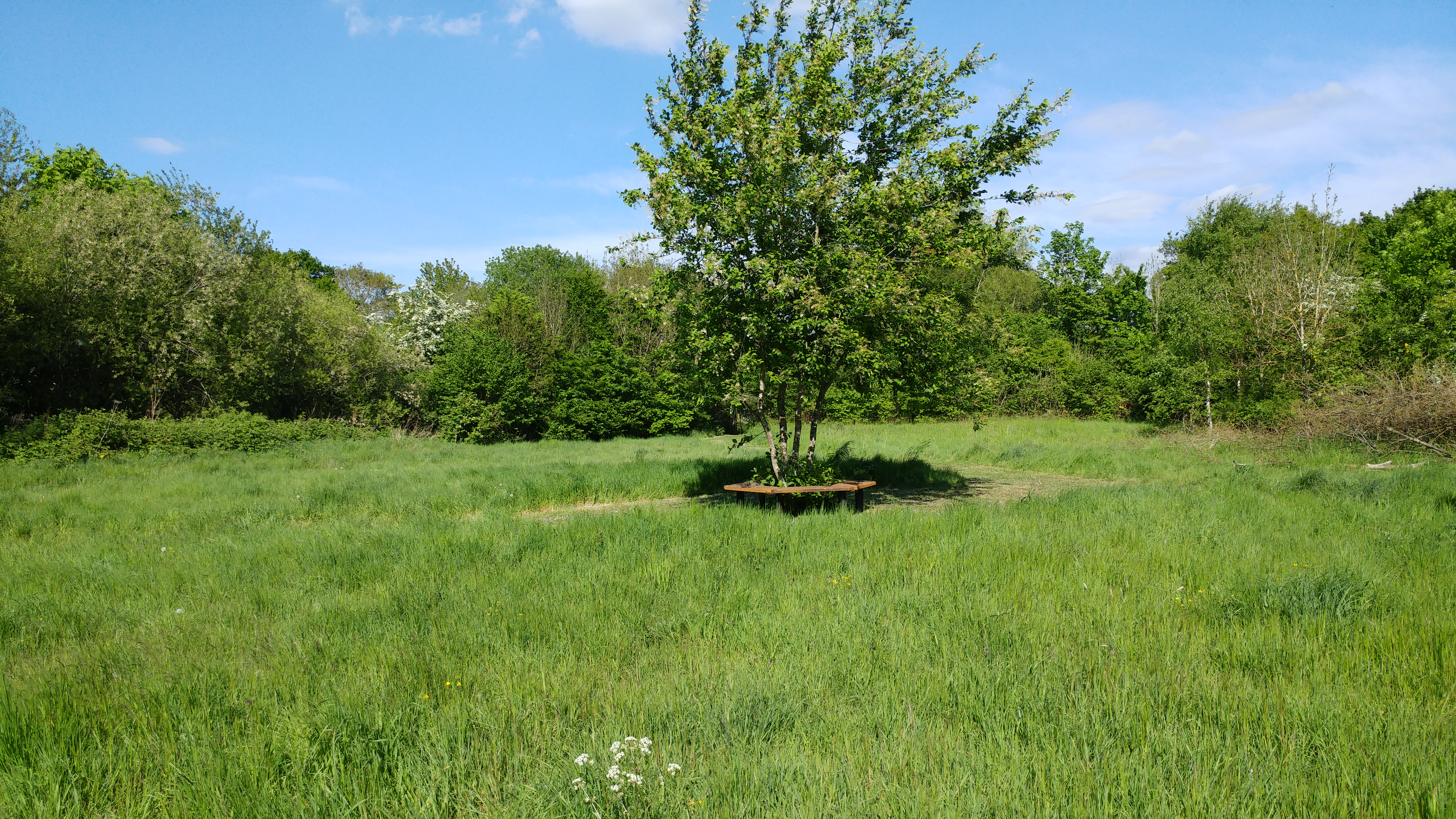
- Interactive map of Swallowfield Meadow
- Type: Local Nature Reserve
- Location: Swallowfield, Berkshire
- OS grid: SU 726 647
- Area: 0.7 hectares (1.7 acres)
- Manager: Swallowfield Parish Council

Swallowfield Meadow is a 0.7-hectare (1.7-acre) Local Nature Reserve in Swallowfield, south of Reading in Berkshire. It is owned and managed by Swallowfield Parish Council.

== Geography and site ==
The reserve features meadows, native hedgerows, a small copse, ditches, and seasonal ponds as well as the meadows themselves.

== History ==
The area that is now the meadow was transferred to the Parish Council in the mid-1990s when houses were being built in the village. Before then the area had been a coal yard.

On 15 July 2003, the area was officially designated as a Local Nature Reserve.

== Fauna ==
The site has the following fauna:

=== Mammals ===
- European water vole

== Flora ==
The site has the following flora:

=== Trees ===
- Betula pendula
- Acer campestre
- Corylus avellana

=== Plants ===
- Leucanthemum vulgare
- Knautia arvensis
