= Hunter baronets =

Extinct baronetcy in the Baronetage of the United Kingdom

- Escutcheon of the Hunter baronets of London
- Creation date: 1812
- Status: extinct
- Extinction date: 1924
- Seat(s): Mortimer Hill, Berkshire

The Hunter Baronetcy, of London, was a title in the Baronetage of the United Kingdom. It was created on 11 December 1812 for Sir Claudius Stephen Hunter, 1st Baronet, Lord Mayor of London and solicitor. The third Baronet sat as member of parliament for Bath between 1910 and 1918. The title became extinct on his death in 1924.

== Hunter baronets, of London (1812) ==
- Sir Claudius Stephen Hunter, 1st Baronet (1775–1851)
- Sir Claudius Stephen Paul Hunter, 2nd Baronet (1825–1890)
- Sir Charles Roderick Hunter, 3rd Baronet (1858–1924)

== See also ==
- Hunter-Blair baronets

Baronetage of the United Kingdom
Preceded by Baillie baronets	Hunter baronets of London; 11 December 1812	Succeeded by Close baronets
