= Ratsitatanina =

Malagasy nobleman (1790–1822)

Ratsitatanina, also known as Ratsitatane (c. 1790-1822), was a Malagasy nobleman. Initially influential at the Merina court in central Madagascar, he fell from grace due to his opposition to the King's British allies. He was exiled to Mauritius, where he escaped from prison, was captured and was executed. He was the son of minister Andriamambavola and was reputedly the nephew of King Radama I, although the latter belief was challenged by the historian Pier Larson, who identified the two as brothers-in-law instead. The first Prime Minister of Madagascar, Andriamihaja, is believed to have been Ratsitatanina's son.

== Opposition to the British ==
Ratsitatanina was a divisional chief in King Radama's army as well as a trusted advisor to the King. His fortunes changed from 1817 onwards when governor of Mauritius Robert Farquhar, in a bid to counter the slave traffic from Madagascar and to curb the influence of the French, signed a treaty of friendship with Radama. Farquhar's agent James Hastie became the King's confidant, a development that sidelined Ratsitatanina, who allegedly favoured the French. As a slave-trader, Ratsitatanina was also displeased about Britain's anti-slavery policy. When he chastened and threatened Hastie over a failed military expedition against the Sakalava people with whom Radama was at war, the King ordered Ratsitatanina's arrest. Possibly, however, Radama's decision to arrest Ratsitatanina was based not on the latter's alleged plot to murder either the British agent or the King himself, but on Radama's distrust and fear of Ratsitatanina and his brothers.

== Exile to Mauritius and death ==
Ratsitatanina was exiled from Madagascar and sent to Mauritius aboard the vessel Menai. He landed in Mauritius on 3 January 1822 and was imprisoned, although he was given some freedom. He worked the sikidy for his fellow prisoners. The British administrators had plans to further exile him to the island of Rodrigues. However, Ratsitatanina escaped and was later captured in the mountains behind the capital of Port Louis by a private militia of maroon-hunters led by Franco-Mauritian lawyer and politician Adrien d'Épinay. An unlikely plot to lead a revolt of slaves and apprentices and to massacre the White inhabitants of Port Louis was imputed to Ratsitatanina and was eagerly believed by the jittery citizens. According to his own testimony, his plan in escaping had been for a boat promised by an accomplice to take him and an entourage of Malagasy slaves and apprentices back to Madagascar. Following a trial, he was beheaded at Plaine Verte on Monday 15 April 1822, keeping his composure even as he watched two alleged accomplices precede him to the block.

== Dramatisations ==
A novel based on his life, Ratsitatane : épisode historique de Maurice by Mauritian author Lucien Brey (pseudonym of Walter Edgar Acton), first appeared as a feuilleton in the magazines Port-Louis Revue (1878) and Le voleur mauricien (1888-1889). A new edition of this novel, edited by Vicram Ramharai, appeared in Port Louis in 2005. Mauritian dramatist Azize Asgarally wrote the play Ratsitatane (1983) in Mauritian Creole. Considered the first historical play of Mauritius, the piece challenges the traditional representation of Ratsitatanina as a savage who abducted a French woman, raped her and drove her to suicide, and instead portrays a shrewd politician who works to rid Madagascar of British influence.
