= Swallowfield, Kentucky =

Unincorporated community in Kentucky, United States

- Unincorporated community
- Location within the state of Kentucky Swallowfield (the United States)
- Coordinates: 38°20′21″N 84°50′55″W
- Country: United States
- State: Kentucky
- County: Franklin
- Elevation: 522 ft (159 m)
- Time zone: UTC-5 (Eastern (EST))
  - Summer (DST): UTC-4 (EDT)
- GNIS feature ID: 504826

Swallowfield is an unincorporated community in Franklin County, Kentucky, United States. Its post office is closed. It was also known as Dottsville.
