= Sir Charles Russell, 3rd Baronet =

British politician and recipient of the Victoria Cross

Sir Charles Russell, Bt
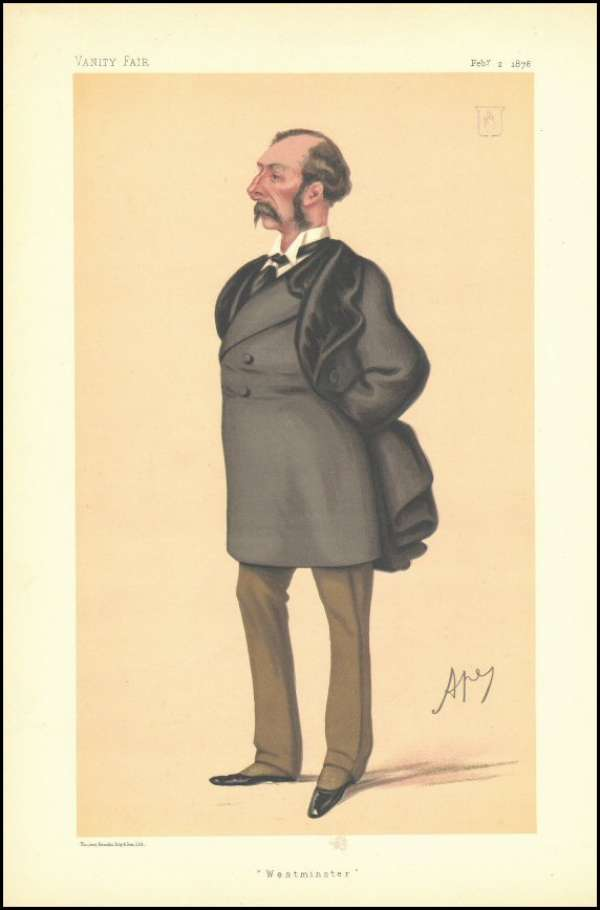
- "Westminster"; Russell as caricatured by Ape (Carlo Pellegrini) in Vanity Fair, February 1878
- Born: 22 June 1826; Sothern Hill, Berkshire
- Died: 13 April 1883 (aged 56); Reading, Berkshire
- Burial place: All Saints' Church (vault), Swallowfield, Berkshire
- Military career
- Allegiance: United Kingdom
- Branch: British Army
- Service years: Enlisted 1847
- Rank: Lieutenant-Colonel
- Units: Grenadier Guards
- Conflicts: Crimean War
- Awards: Victoria Cross; Order of the Medjidieh (Ottoman Empire)
- Other work: Member of Parliament

Lieutenant-Colonel Sir Charles Russell, 3rd Baronet VC (22 June 1826 – 13 April 1883), was a British Conservative politician and soldier. He was a recipient of the Victoria Cross, the highest and most prestigious award for gallantry in the face of the enemy that can be awarded to British and Commonwealth forces.

== Early life ==
Russell was the second but eldest surviving son of Sir Henry Russell, 2nd Baronet, British Resident at the court of Hyderabad in India, and his second wife, Marie Clotilde daughter of Benoît Mottet de La Fontaine, Baron Fieffé de St Corneille.

He was educated at Eton College and entered the Grenadier Guards in 1847. Charles inherited the baronetcy and the family estate of Swallowfield Park in Berkshire in 1852.

== Career ==
He became a lieutenant and a captain the following year and accompanied his regiment to the Crimea where he took part in the Siege of Sebastopol and the Battles of Alma, Balaclava and Inkerman. He was a 28-year-old Brevet Major in the 3rd Battalion in the latter battle when the following action took place for which he was awarded the VC. On 5 November 1854, Brevet Major Russell offered to dislodge a party of Russians from the Sandbag Battery if anyone would follow him. A sergeant and privates, Anthony Palmer and another who was subsequently killed – were the first to volunteer. The party met much resistance and several times seemed to be on the point of annihilation but their skill, especially with the bayonet, finally brought success. Major Russell himself fought with great valour and in single combat wrenched the rifle out of the grasp of a powerful Russian. His citation read:

Offered to dislodge a party of Russians from the Sand-bag Battery, if any one would follow him; Serjeant Norman, Privates Anthony Palmer, and Bailey (who was killed) volunteered the first. The attack succeeded.

His Victoria Cross is displayed at The Guards Regimental Headquarters (Grenadier Guards RHQ), Wellington Barracks, London, England. He later achieved the rank of lieutenant colonel.

=== Politics ===
He was involved in politics and sat as Conservative as Member of Parliament for Berkshire from 1865 to 1868 and for Westminster from 1874 to 1883. Lord Salisbury as Foreign Secretary (at which he served four times, and thrice was Prime Minister) appointed Sir Charles as Chairman of the Peruvian Bondholders Committee. Its aim was to "stop Peru from contracting a fresh loan to buy munitions". More broadly the Europeans wished to delay US Navy assistance to Peru, which had already been defeated by the Chileans. Both Britain and France had large investments to protect: the rise of Peruvian bond stock, they contended was due to debt and military defeats. Britain refused to become embroiled; whereas the United States was spoiling for an international war. They secretly lobbied at Santiago against Russell and British interests to create a crisis. The Chileans "received with acclamation" in the City of London, assigning profits of Tarapaca mines and the nitrate-rich Guano Islands to the indebted bondholders. On this basis, Russell welcomed Chile's conquest of southern Peru. The Americans responded, to the alarm of the Foreign Office and Admiralty, by leasing the Peruvian port of Chimbote as a Naval base. Russell was more concerned with the financial implications for City investors. Wary of the risks of a proxy war, the bondholders urged Parliament to recognise General Yglesias, the new Peruvian leader. The Americans stubbornly refused to grant the new government of 1884 recognition of its international status, even after the Treaty of Ancon had ceased hostilities.

== Personal life ==
He died unmarried on 13 April 1883 and was buried in the family vault beneath his family's transept (built in 1832) in the Church of England church of Swallowfield, Berkshire. He was succeeded in the baronetcy by his brother, George.

Parliament of the United Kingdom
Preceded by Philip Pleydell-Bouverie; John Walter; Richard Benyon	Member of Parliament for Berkshire; 1865–1868; With: Richard Benyon; Robert Loyd-Lindsay	Succeeded by Richard Benyon; Robert Loyd-Lindsay; John Walter
Preceded by Robert Grosvenor; William Henry Smith	Member of Parliament for Westminster; 1874–1882; With: William Henry Smith	Succeeded by William Henry Smith; Lord Algernon Percy
Baronetage of the United Kingdom
Preceded by Henry Russell	Baronet (of Swallowfield); 1852–1883	Succeeded by George Russell
