= Adrien d'Épinay =

Franco-Mauritian lawyer and politician (1794-1839)

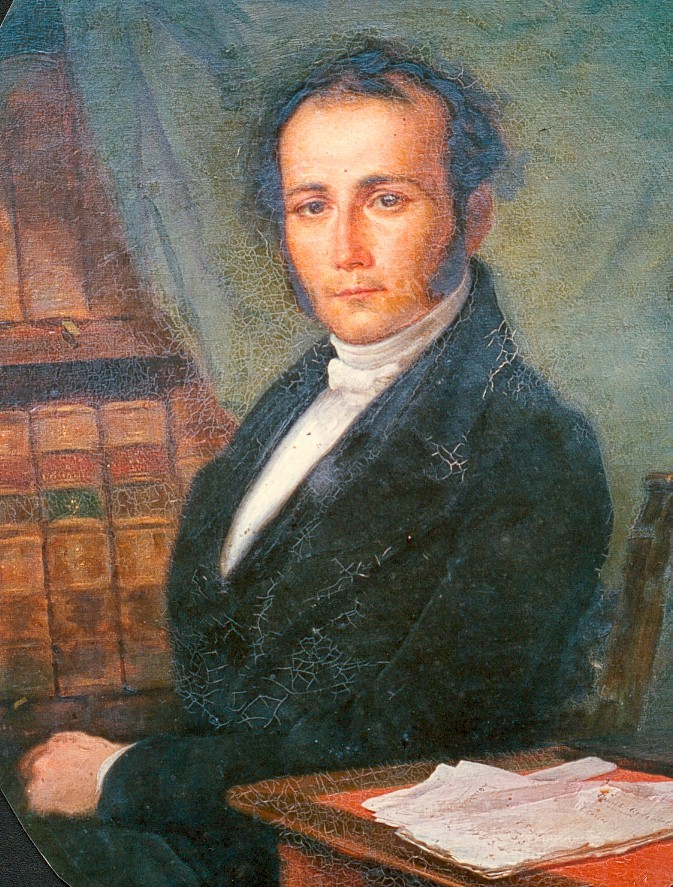
Adrien d'Épinay; from Mauritius, by Denis Piat

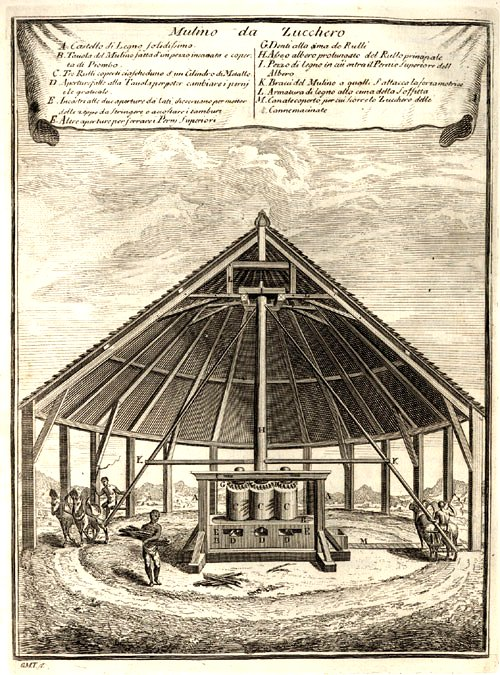
18th century sugar mill

Antoine Zacharie Adrien d'Épinay (6 February 1794 – 9 December 1839) was a Franco-Mauritian lawyer and politician.

== Biography ==
Adrien d'Épinay was born in Isle de France on 6 February 1794, the son of Antoine Jean d'Épinay and Marie Marthe Blanc. He became a lawyer and politician, infamous for his many fights against the abolition of slavery and amelioration policies. At the beginning of the 19th century he helped found the Société royale des Arts et des Sciences de l'île Maurice, the Bank of Mauritius and the first 'independent' and daily newspaper in Mauritius, Le Cernéen, after the Portuguese name for the island, in which he published many virulently racist tracts against Blacks and people of colour.

He started his career at the bar in Port Louis in 1816. He married Marguerite Le Breton de la Vieuville on 14 April 1817 in Flacq, and was the father of the sculptor Prosper d'Épinay (1836–1914), who created the statue of his father which was unveiled on 26 September 1866 in the French East India Company garden at Port-Louis.

On the death of Charles Thomi Pitot (1779–1821), Adrien d'Épinay, aged 27, became a more prominent political figure. In early 1822 concerned about the threat to the local population posed by Malagasy escapee and political prisoner Ratsitatanina he applied maroon-hunting skills to assemble a private militia which captured Ratsitatanina before the colony's garrison tracked him down. In April 1822 Ratsitatanina was executed in Plaine Verte, Port Louis.

He was against slaves owning property, against their marriage, against manumission. He described the Protector of slaves as being "the enemy of slavery, the enemy of our institutions, the enemy of our colony" and was responsible for creating frenzied resistance against British amelioration policies to the treatment of slaves.

He made representations to the British Government in London in 1831 and in 1833 on behalf of sugar planters who were slave owners. By so doing he negotiated a compensation for farmers, for the loss of their slaves, and who had to organise themselves to find replacement workers on the sugar estates. Following the enactment of the British Slave Compensation Act 1837 Adrien d'Épinay successfully lodged claims against the release of his 120 slaves and received £4,324 (equivalent to $420,000 in 2025). His wife lodged claims for her 335 slaves and she received £10,868 (equivalent to $1,050,000 in 2025). He also secured the right of colonists to serve on the Legislative Council, the abolition of monopoly, the establishing of a police force, the prosecution of abuse related to alcohol, and the lifting of censorship of the press. With his half-brother Prosper (1780-1856), he founded the newspaper Le Cernéen, whose first number appeared on 14 February 1832.

His construction of the first steam-driven sugar mill at Argy, near Quatre Cocos, was of great benefit to the sugar industry.

He left Mauritius in 1839 and died in Paris on 9 December of the same year. His remains were returned to Mauritius and interred at the Pamplemousses Cemetery on 1 June 1840. His library of more than 3,000 volumes was bequeathed to the Collège Royal in Port Louis in 1839, and today forms part of the Bibliothèque Carnegie, but is threatened by inadequate preservation and restoration.

== Legacy ==
The former house of d'Épinay became the home of politician and doctor Onésipho Beaugeard (1832-1898) and was also the birth place of poet Robert Edward Hart (1891-1954). It was converted by the Government of Mauritius into primary school Dr. Onésipho Beaugeard Government School, and has been under threat of demolition since 2006 by the Ministry of Education.

In 1939 a statue of Adrien d'Epinay was erected at Jardin de la Compagnie in Port Louis to commemorate the centenary of his death. On 13 April 1976, Organisation Fraternelle erected a concrete monument nearby to mark the 141st anniversary of the Abolition of Slavery. In 2005 a plaque was affixed to the base of Adrien d'Epinay's statue with inscriptions that decry the crimes committed against slaves.
