= Russellite (mineral) =

Bismuth tungstate mineral

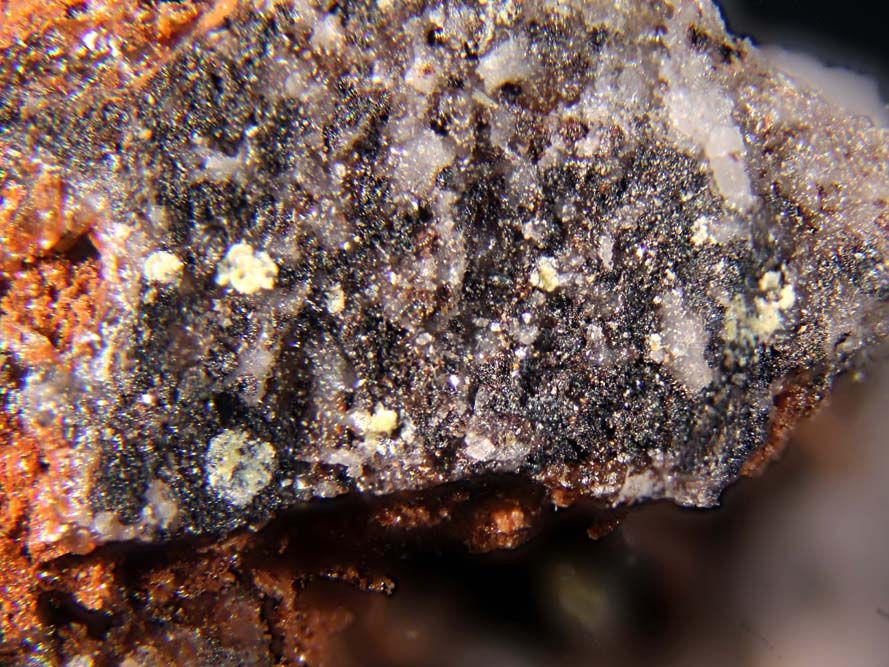
- Yellow globular aggregates of the rare tungsten mineral russellite from the famous Clara Mine (Wolfach, Black Forest, Baden-Württemberg, Germany).

General
- Category: Tungstate minerals
- Formula: Bi_{2}WO_{6}
- IMA symbol: Rll
- Strunz classification: 4.DE.15
- Crystal system: Orthorhombic
- Crystal class: Pyramidal (mm2); H-M symbol: (mm2)
- Space group: Pca2_{1}
- Unit cell: a = 5.43 Å, b = 16.43 Å c = 5.45 Å; Z = 4

Identification
- Color: Yellow-green, yellow
- Crystal habit: Fine-grained, compact, massive
- Mohs scale hardness: 3.5
- Specific gravity: 7.33–7.37
- Optical properties: Biaxial (+)
- Refractive index: 2.17–2.51
- Dispersion: Relatively strong

Russellite is a bismuth tungstate mineral with the chemical formula Bi_{2}WO_{6}. It crystallizes in the orthorhombic crystal system. Russellite is yellow or yellow-green in color, with a Mohs hardness of 3 1/2.

Russellite is named for the mineralogist Sir Arthur Russell, and the type locality is the Castle-an-Dinas Mine, near St Columb Major in Cornwall, where it was found in 1938 in wolframite. It occurs as a secondary alteration of other bismuth bearing minerals in tin−tungsten hydrothermal ore deposits, pegmatites and greisens. It typically occurs associated with native bismuth, bismuthinite, bismite, wolframite, ferberite, scheelite, ferritungstite, anthoinite, mpororoite, koechlinite, cassiterite, topaz, muscovite, tourmaline and quartz.
