= Sir George Russell, 4th Baronet =

British politician (1828-1898)

Sir George Russell MP JP
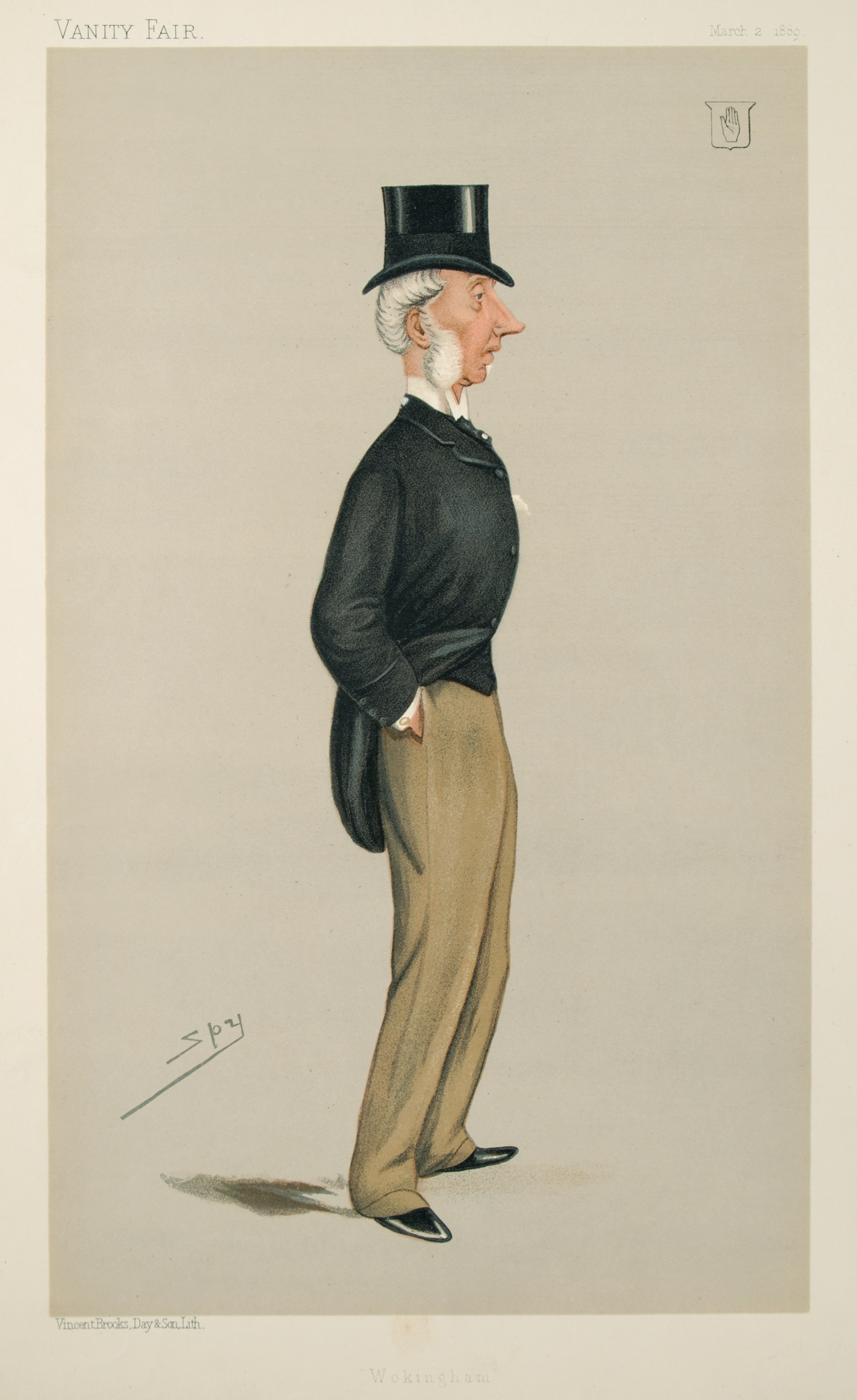
- "Wokingham"; Russell as caricatured by "Spy" (Leslie Ward) in Vanity Fair, March 1889

Member of Parliament for Wokingham
- In office 1885–1898
- Preceded by: New constituency
- Succeeded by: Oliver Young

Personal details
- Born: 23 August 1828
- Died: 7 March 1898 (aged 69)
- Party: Conservative
- Spouse: Constance Lennox (m. 1871)
- Parents: Sir Henry Russell, 2nd Baronet (father); Marie Clotilde Mottet de la Fontaine (mother)
- Relatives: Benoît Mottet de La Fontaine (maternal grandfather); Sir Charles Russell, 3rd Baronet (brother); Lord Arthur Lennox (father-in-law); Arthur Russell (son); Ernest Guinness (son-in-law)
- Education: Eton College
- Alma mater: Exeter College, Oxford

Sir George Russell, 4th Baronet JP (23 August 1828 – 7 March 1898) was a British judge and Conservative politician who sat in the House of Commons from 1885 to 1898. He was chairman of South Eastern Railway from 1895 to 1898.

== Early life ==
Russell was the third son of Sir Henry Russell, 2nd Baronet and his wife Marie Clotilde Mottet de la Fontaine, a daughter of Baron Benoît Mottet de La Fontaine.

He was educated at Eton and Exeter College, Oxford. He was called to the bar at Lincoln's Inn in 1853 and went to the Oxford Circuit. In 1862 he became recorder of Wokingham.

== Career ==
He was a County Court Judge of County Circuit No. 19 from 1866 to 1874, and of Circuit No. 49 from 1874 to February 1884. He succeeded his brother Charles as 4th baronet in 1883.

In the 1885 general election, Russell was elected the Conservative Member of Parliament (MP) for Wokingham. He served until his death at the age of 69 in 1898.

Russell was elected Chairman of the South Eastern Railway (SER) on 24 January 1895, and served in that post until his death on 7 March 1898, being replaced by Cosmo Bonsor. During Russell's short term as chairman, the SER began to work more closely with its rivals. The Railway Times remarked

upon his succession to the chair he initiated a policy wholly new to that company, the salient features of which were peace with its neighbours and an energetic development of its own resources.

— quoted in Dendy Marshall & Kidner 1982, p. 314

== Personal life ==
In 1871 Russell married Constance Charlotte Elizabeth Lennox, daughter of Lord Arthur Lennox (a younger son of the 4th Duke of Richmond). He was succeeded in the baronetcy by his son George. They lived at Swallowfield Park in Berkshire. Their children were:

- Marie Clothilde Russell (1873-1953), who married the Hon. Ernest Guinness, second son of Edward Guinness, 1st Earl of Iveagh.
- Sir George Arthur Charles Russell, 5th Baronet (1868–1944)
- Sir Arthur Edward Ian Montagu Russell, 6th Baronet (1878–1964)

Sir George died on 7 March 1898.

Parliament of the United Kingdom
New constituency see Berkshire	Member of Parliament for Wokingham; 1885–1898	Succeeded by Oliver Young
Baronetage of the United Kingdom
Preceded by Charles Russell	Baronet (of Swallowfield); 1883–1896	Succeeded by George Russell
