= Swallowfield Park =

Stately home and estate in Berkshire, England

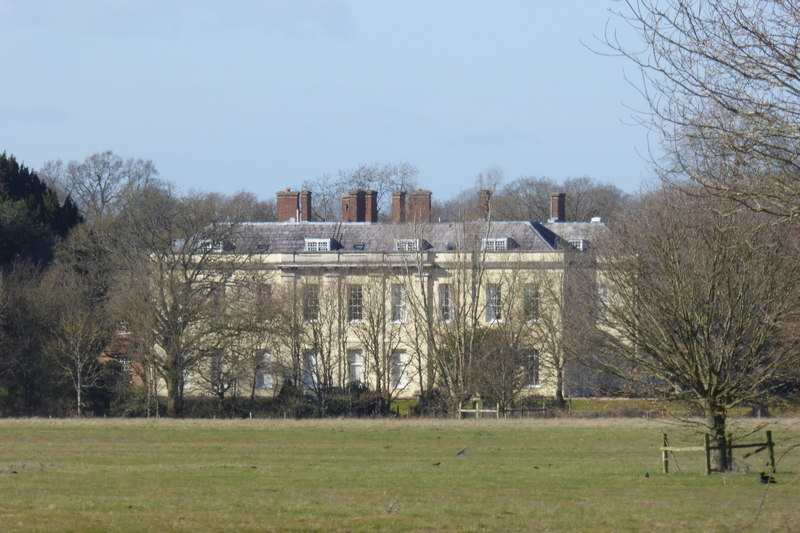
- Swallowfield Park house

- Location within Berkshire

General information
- Type: Country house
- Location: Church Road, Swallowfield, Berkshire, England
- Coordinates: 51°23′1.61″N 0°56′55.38″W
- Year built: 1689
- Owner: Private

Design and construction
- Architect: William Talman

Listed Building – Grade II*
- Official name: Swallowfield Park and adjoining stable block
- Designated: 1 August 1952
- Reference no.: 1313056

Swallowfield Park is a Grade II* listed stately home and estate in the English county of Berkshire. The house is near the village of Swallowfield, some 4 miles (6.4 km) south of the town of Reading.

== The house ==
Swallowfield Park was the home of the Backhouse family from the late 16th century, who had lived in a now demolished Tudor mansion. The most famous member of this family was of William Backhouse, the Rosicrucian philosopher. The present house at Swallowfield Park was erected in 1689 by Henry Hyde, 2nd Earl of Clarendon, when he acquired the estate on his marriage to Backhouse's daughter Flower. The architect was William Talman, "comptroller of the works" to William III. Talman built a H-shaped house with short projections to the front and more extended ones to the rear. The house was the childhood home of Edward Hyde, 3rd Earl of Clarendon.

In 1717 Thomas 'Diamond' Pitt, the Governor of Fort St. George, bought Swallowfield Park from Edward Hyde, reputedly using part of the proceeds of his sale of the Regent Diamond to Philippe II, Duke of Orléans. The Pitt family sold the property to John Dodd for £20,000, and it remained in that family until purchased in 1783 by Silvanus Bevan. The sale, at Christie's, lasted seven days and included a large number of pictures and objets d'art. After a quarrel with a neighbour about shooting rights, Bevan sold the property in 1789. The Bevan crest, a griffin, still remains over the stone carved mantelpiece in the hall.

The house was bought in 1820 by Sir Henry Russell, Chief Justice of Bengal in India, who employed William Atkinson to undertake many adaptations and alterations to the house. Internally, little of Talman's house survives as a result of these changes. A new staircase was installed, which resulted in the removal of a carved cornice made for the Earl of Clarendon by Grinling Gibbons. In 1852 the house was inherited by his grandson, Sir Charles Russell VC.

In 1923 the house was recorded as containing many fine portraits, including George Romney's painting of Lady Russell and son (1786–87), of Michael Russell (1785) and of Henry Russell; portraits of the Shelley family, Captain the Hon. William Fitzwilliam, Mr. Benyon and Mrs. Beard by Hogarth; George Richmond's portraits of Sir Henry Russell, bart., and of Charles Russell, afterwards third baronet, and another portrait of the same by Sir John Millais. At this time, the library held a large collection of books and many treasures, including Dr. Dee's magic mirror.

The house was purchased by the Country Houses Association in about 1975 and refurbished to provide retirement flats with communal living areas. After the CHA went into liquidation in 2003, the mansion was acquired by property developers, Sunley Heritage, and converted into self-contained apartments.

== The gardens ==
John Evelyn described the gardens as having "the delicious and rarest fruits" and "innumerable timber trees in the ground about the seate" including elms, limes, and oaks. He listed the estate's parterres, nurseries, kitchen garden, orangeries, and "the canall and fishponds, the one fed with a white, the other with a black running water" stocked with pike, carp, bream and tench.

== See also ==
- Grade II* listed buildings in Berkshire
