= Swallowfield =

Coordinates: 51°22′41″N 0°57′32″W

- Village
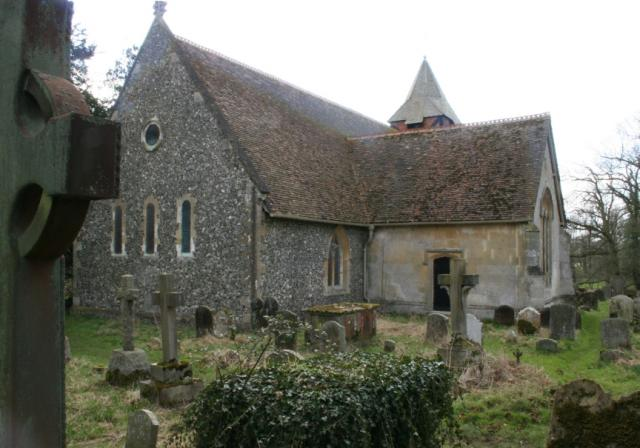
- All Saints' parish church

- Location within Berkshire
- Population: 1,961 (2001 Census); 1,971 (2011 Census)
- OS grid reference: SU7264
- Civil parish: Swallowfield
- Unitary authority: Wokingham
- Ceremonial county: Berkshire
- Region: South East
- Country: England
- Sovereign state: United Kingdom
- Post town: Reading
- Postcode district: RG7
- Dialling code: 0118
- Police: Thames Valley
- Fire: Royal Berkshire
- Ambulance: South Central
- UK Parliament: Wokingham

Swallowfield is a village and civil parish in the Wokingham district, in Berkshire, England, about 5 miles (8 km) south of Reading, and 1 mile (1.6 km) north of the county boundary with Hampshire. The civil parish of Swallowfield also includes the nearby villages of Riseley and Farley Hill. In 2011 the parish had a population of 1971.

== Geography ==
Swallowfield has a site of Special Scientific Interest (SSSI) on the south western edge of the village, called Stanford End Mill and River Loddon The village has a local nature reserve called Swallowfield Meadow. Swallowfield Park is a stately home situated in an estate half a mile north east of the village. The current mansion has been converted into exclusive apartments.

== Notable residents ==
Swallowfield has been the home of a number of famous persons including Thomas 'Diamond' Pitt, the Governor of Fort St. George; William Backhouse, the Rosicrucian philosopher; Henry Hyde, 2nd Earl of Clarendon; and, in his childhood, Edward Hyde, 3rd Earl of Clarendon. The 19th century author Mary Russell Mitford retired to the village and is buried in the churchyard.
