= List of people from Reading, Berkshire =

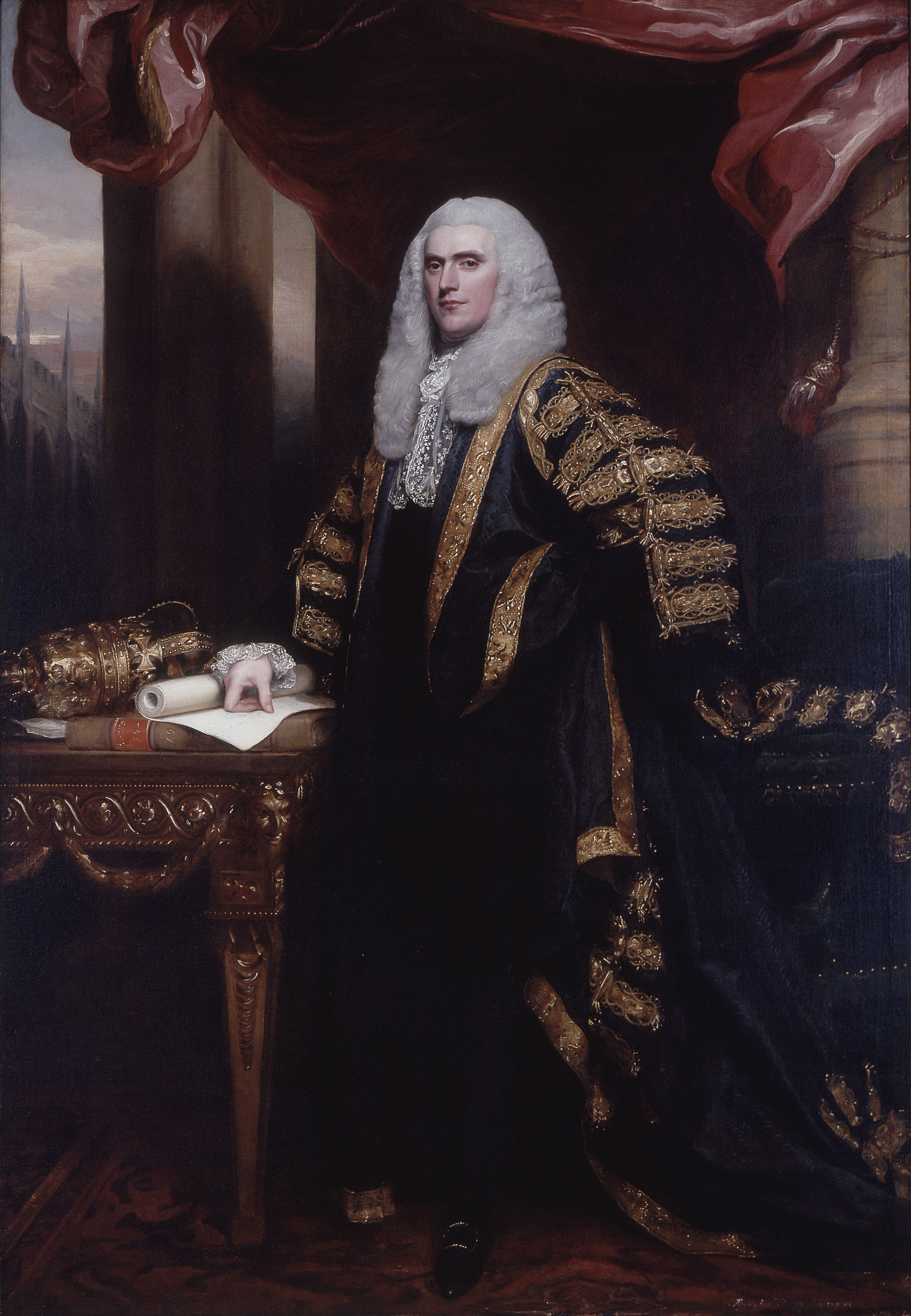
Portrait of Henry Addington by John Singleton Copley, 1798. Addington served as Prime Minister from 1801 to 1804

This is a list of notable people with a strong connection with the town of Reading in the English county of Berkshire. Normally these will be people who were born in Reading, or who have lived in the town, or who have represented the town in some way, for example by acting as its Member of Parliament. This list does not include people whose sole connection to the town is to have been born in the Royal Berkshire Hospital. The listing is in alphabetic order of surname.

See also: Academics of the University of Reading and Alumni of the University of Reading.

== A ==
- Nelson Abbey (b. 2003, footballer)
- Henry Addington, Viscount Sidmouth (1757–1844; former Prime Minister; donor of land for Royal Berkshire Hospital)
- John Alcock (1715–1806; organist and composer)
- Sir George Alexander (1858–1918; actor and theatre manager)
- Sir Hugh Percy Allen (1869–1946; professor and conductor)
- Ronald Allen (1930–1991; actor)
- Chloe Alper (b. 1981; musician)
- John Altman (b. 1952; actor)
- Len Andrews (1888–1969; footballer)
- Jamie Ashdown (b. 1980; footballer)
- Sir Arthur Aston (1590–1649; governor during the Siege of Reading in 1643)
- Jane Austen (1775–1817; author. Went to school in Reading)
- Rosella Ayane (b. 1996; footballer)

== B ==
- Ken Barrington (1930–1981; cricketer)
- Luke Beaven (b. 1989; cricketer)
- Eliza Bennett (b. 1992; actress)
- Jacqueline Bisset (b. 1944; actress)
- Daniel Blagrave (1603–1668; former Member of Parliament and regicide)
- John Blagrave (c1561–1611; early mathematician)
- Michael Bond (1926–2017; author; creator of Paddington Bear)
- Adam Boulton (b. 1959; political editor)
- Felix Bowness (1922–2009; jockey in hit BBC sitcom Hi-de-Hi!)
- Thomas Braddock (1556–1607; priest, translator and Headmaster of Reading School)
- Charlie Brooker (b. 1971; satirist and broadcaster)
- Angela Browning (b. 1946; politician)
- Richard Burns (1971–2005; rally driver)
- Deon Burton (b. 1976; footballer)
- Christopher Butler (1902–1986; Roman Catholic bishop and theologian)
- Sir Clifford Charles Butler (1922–1999; physicist, co-discoverer of hyperons and mesons)
- Jamie Bynoe-Gittens (b. 2004; footballer)
- David Byron (1947–1985; original lead vocalist with rock group Uriah Heep)

== C ==
- William Cadogan, Earl Cadogan (1675–1726; commander-in-chief of the British Army)
- Alfred Cannan (born 1968; Chief Minister of the Isle of Man since 2021)
- John Cennick (1718–1755; early Methodist and Moravian evangelist and hymnwriter)
- Percy Chapman (1900–1961; cricketer, captain of the victorious England 1926 Ashes team)
- William Macbride Childs (1869–1939; historian, instrumental in creation of the University of Reading, first Vice-Chancellor)
- Alexander Ross Clarke (1828–1914; geodesist; director of the measurement department of the Ordnance Survey)
- Alan Clayson (b. 1951; musician and author)
- Alma Cogan (1932–1966; popular singer of the 1950s)
- Rebecca Cooke (b. 1983), swimmer, gold medallist at the 2002 and 2006 Commonwealth Games
- William Cowen (b. 2003), trampoline gymnast, medallist at the Trampoline Gymnastics World Championships
- Phoebe Cusden (1887–1981; socialist, trade unionist, educator, peace campaigner and Mayor of Reading)

== D ==
- Lisa Daniely (born Mary Elizabeth Bodington) (1929–2014) actress
- Simon Doonan (b. 1952; creative director of Barneys department store in New York City)
- Natalie Dormer (b. 1982; actress)
- Evelyn Dunbar (1906–1960; war artist)
- Tony Durant (b. 1928; former Member of Parliament for Reading)

== E ==
- Peter Emery (1926-2004; former Member of Parliament for Reading)
- Michael East (1978-); 2002 Commonwealth Games 1500m champion
- Henry of Essex (?–c.1170; royal standard bearer and loser of a trial by combat on De Montfort Island)
- John Eynon (?–1539; pastor of St Giles' Church, martyred at the dissolution of the monasteries)

== F ==
- Hugh Cook Faringdon (?–1539) last Abbot of Reading Abbey. Martyred at the dissolution of the monasteries
- Jordan Fish (b. 1986) British record producer, songwriter, and musician. Former member of metalcore band Bring Me The Horizon
- Lilian Fontaine (née Ruse, formerly de Havilland) (1886–1975) English actress. Mother of actresses Olivia de Havilland and Joan Fontaine
- Michael Foot (1913–2010) politician
- Justin Fletcher (b. 1970) Children's TV personality

== G ==
- Ricky Gervais (b. 1961; comedian)
- David Gill (b. 1957; football executive)
- Jane Griffiths (b. 1954; former Member of Parliament for Reading)
- Jamie Gittens (b. 2004; footballer for Chelsea F.C

== H ==
- Lambert Beverly Halstead (1933–1991; palaeontologist and populariser of science)
- Neil Halstead (b. 1970; musician, founding member of Slowdive and Mojave 3
- Bernard Laurence Hieatt (1909–1930 Motorcycle sidecar champion & world record holder)
- John Howard Hinton (1791–1873; author and Baptist minister)
- Ernest Hives (1886–1965; aero-engine designer and industrialist)
- Richard Howitt (b. 1961– Labour MEP for the East of England was born in Reading)
- Joseph Huntley (1775–?; innovative biscuit maker; founder of Huntley & Palmers)

== I ==
- Rufus Isaacs, Marquess of Reading (1860–1935; lawyer, politician, former Member of Parliament for Reading)

== J ==
- Sarah Jory (1969), musician

== K ==
- Joseph Anthony Kelly (b.1958; editor and theologian)
- John Kendrick (1573–1624; merchant and mayor)
- Fran Kirby (b. 1993; footballer)
- Miranda Krestovnikoff (b. 1973; biologist and television presenter)
- Jeremy Kyle (b. 1965; radio and television presenter)

== L ==
- William Laud (1573–1645; former archbishop of Canterbury)
- David Lean (1908–1991; film director and producer)
- John Lee (b. 1927; former Member of Parliament for Reading)
- Brendon Leigh (b. 1999; former Formula One Esports driver)
- SG Lewis (b. 1994; DJ, singer, producer)
- Nikolai Liakhoff (1897–1962; pioneer of guide dog training)

== M ==
- Morgan MacRae (b. 2001; Welsh rugby union player)
- Sir John Madejski (b. 1941; entrepreneur and philanthropist)
- Ken Major (1928–2009; architect and molinologist)
- William Marshal, Earl of Pembroke (1146–1219; Earl Marshal and Regent of England)
- Henry Marten (1602–1680; regicide, Parliamentarian Governor of Reading)
- Peter May (1929–1994; cricketer)
- Tom McIntyre (b. 1998, footballer).
- Mary Russell Mitford (1787–1855; author, poet and playwright)
- Sir Sam Mendes (b. 1965; director)
- James Merrick (1720–1769; poet and scholar)
- Shawn Michaels (b. 1965, professional wrestler)
- Catherine, Princess of Wales (née Catherine Middleton) (b. 1982; married to Prince William)
- Ian Mikardo (1908–1993; former Member of Parliament for Reading)
- Sir Francis Moore (1558–1621; lawyer, former Member of Parliament for Reading)
- Hayden Mullins (b. 1979; footballer)
- Chunya Munga (b. 2000; rugby player)

== N ==
- Arthur Negus (1903–1985; broadcaster and antiques expert)
- John Newbery (1713–1767; publisher and bookseller)
- Charlotte Nichols (born 1991), member of UK parliament for Warrington North since 2019 representing the Labour Party (UK)

== O ==
- Cormac Murphy O'Connor (1932–2017; former archbishop of Westminster and head of the Roman Catholic Church in England and Wales)
- Mike Oldfield (b. 1953; composer and artist)
- Washington Yotto Ochieng (b. 1963; Kenyan-British Academic)

== P ==
- George Palmer (1818–1897; biscuit manufacturer, entrepreneur and politician; proprietor of Huntley & Palmers)
- George William Palmer (1851–1913; son of George Palmer, also a politician and proprietor of Huntley & Palmers)
- Jonathan Perkins (b. 1976; cricketer)
- Sir Constantine Henry Phipps,(1656–1723), Lord Chancellor of Ireland.
- Dick Poole (cyclist; first man to cycle from Land's End to John o'Groats in under two days)
- Rev Dr John Pordage (1607–1681; priest and mystic, vicar of St Laurence's)
- Fred Potts (1892–1943; holder of the Victoria Cross)
- Stuart Price (b. 1977; electronic musician)

== S ==
- Martin Salter (b. 1954; former Member of Parliament for Reading West)
- Lawrie Sanchez (b. 1959; footballer and manager)
- Percival Sanger (1899—1968, first-class cricketer and an officer in both the British Army and the British Indian Army)
- Harriet Scott (b. 1993) footballer for the Republic of Ireland national team
- Richard Sheepshanks (1794–1855; astronomer)
- Yasmina Siadatan (b. 1981; businesswoman)
- Charles Simeon (1759–1836; English evangelical clergyman)
- Sir John Simeon (1756–1824; former Member of Parliament for Reading)
- George Blackall Simonds (1843–1929; sculptor and brewer)
- William Blackall Simonds (1761–1834; brewer and banker)
- William Albert Smallcombe (1892-1992); curator of Reading Museum from 1926-1957
- Goldwin Smith (1823–1910; historian and journalist)
- Sir John Soane (1753–1837; architect)
- Michael Sprott (b. 1975; professional heavyweight boxer)
- Sir Frank Stenton (1880–1967; professor and Vice-Chancellor of the University of Reading)
- Matilda Stanley (1818–1908; Queen of the Gypsies)
- Dennis Stokes (1911–1998; cricketer who captained Berkshire and played first-class cricket for the Minor Counties)
- Peter Strickland (b. 1973; film director)
- Edith Sutton (1862-1957) first female councillor in England, first woman Mayor of Reading, suffragist
- Matthew Syed (b. 1970; table tennis champion, journalist, author and broadcaster)
- John Sykes (b. 1959; guitarist and singer)

== R ==
- Matt Rodda Labour MP for Reading Central

== T ==
- William Henry Fox Talbot (1800–1877; early photographer)
- Thomas Noon Talfourd (1795–1854; judge and author)
- Chris Tarrant (b. 1946; radio broadcaster and original host of Who Wants to Be a Millionaire?)
- Toby Tarrant Son of Chris Tarrant. Presenter on Radio X.
- Elizabeth Taylor (1912–1975; novelist)
- Ethelwynn Trewavas (1900–1993; ichthyologist)
- Alexander Turner, recipient of the Victoria Cross

== V ==
- Tanfield Vachell (1602–1658; former Member of Parliament for Reading and owner of Coley Park)
- Gerard Folliott Vaughan (1923–2003; psychiatrist and former Member of Parliament for Reading East)

== W ==
- Rob Warner (b. 1970; mountain biker)
- Kevin Warwick (b. 1954; scientist)
- Neil Webb (b. 1963; footballer)
- Sir Thomas White (1492–1567; merchant, founder of St John's College at Oxford University)
- Doug "The Anarchist" Williams (b. 1972; wrestler)
- Rob Wilson (b. 1965; former Member of Parliament for Reading East)
- Kate Winslet (b. 1975; actress)
- Pamela Wolfe (b. 1950; artist and children's book illustrator), emigrated to New Zealand in 1953
- Lucy Worsley (b. 1973; historian and television personality)
