= Gladys Milton Palmer =

British film producer and Sarawak princess

- Dayang Muda of Sarawak
- Born: 8 January 1884; Reading, Berkshire, England
- Died: 12 June 1952 (aged 68); Colombo, Dominion of Ceylon
- Spouse: Bertram Brooke, Tuan Muda of Sarawak
- Issue: Jean Brooke; Elizabeth Brooke; Anne Brooke; Anthony Brooke
- Father: Sir Walter Palmer, 1st Baronet
- Mother: Jean Craig
- Religion: Islam (previously Quaker)
- Occupation: Film producer

Gladys Milton Palmer, Dayang Muda of Sarawak, also known as Khair-ul-Nissa and Khair un-nisa binti 'Abdu'llah (8 January 1884 – 12 June 1952) was a British film producer and heiress. Through her marriage to Bertram Willes Dayrell Brooke, she was a member of the ruling dynasty of Sarawak.

== Biography ==
=== Early life and family ===
Palmer was born in 1884 in Reading, Berkshire, into a prominent Quaker family. She was the only child of Sir Walter Palmer, 1st Baronet and Jean Craig.

Her paternal grandfather was George Palmer, a proprietor of Huntley & Palmers. Her maternal grandfather was the engineer and politician William Young Craig. She was a niece of George William Palmer and a great-niece of William Isaac Palmer.

=== Marriage and issue ===
On 28 June 1904 Palmer married Bertram Willes Dayrell Brooke, the son of Charles Brooke, Rajah of Sarawak and Margaret de Windt. Through this marriage, she became a member of the ruling dynasty of the Raj of Sarawak. After her father-in-law died in 1917, her husband's older brother, Charles Vyner Brooke, succeeded the throne. Her husband was made heir presumptive and accorded the title Tuan Muda of Sarawak and style of Highness. As the wife of the Tuan Muda, Palmer was accorded the title Dayang Muda and the style of Highness.

Palmer and Brooke had four children:

- Jean Margaret Palmer Brooke
- Elizabeth Brooke
- Anne Elaine Primula Brooke
- Anthony Walter Dayrell Brooke

=== Career ===
In 1922, Palmer formed a film company called Big Four Famous Productions Company. She produced one film, Potter's Clay which featured actress Ellen Terry.

In 1929 Palmer published a memoir, Relations and Complications, which was ghostwritten by Kay Boyle with additional contributions from John Glassco, Robert McAlmon, and Graeme Taylor.

=== Later life and death ===
In 1932, Palmer converted from Christianity to Islam. Stating that she wished her "conversion to be performed on no earthly territory", she chartered an Imperial Airways 42-seat airliner to fly from Croydon Airport to Paris. Another British Muslim convert, Khalid Sheldrake, conducted the ceremony over the English Channel. Sheldrake gave her the Arabic name "Khair-ul-Nissa" ("fairest of women") or "Khair un-nisa binti 'Abdu'llah".

She died in 1952 in a nursing home in Ceylon. She was buried at St Leonard's in Sheepstor, Devon.
