= Khalid Sheldrake =

English pickle manufacturer

- Born: Bertram William Sheldrake; 1888; London, England
- Died: 1947 (aged 58–59); London, England
- Occupations: pickle manufacturer, Islamic philanthropist, King-elect of Islamestan
- Known for: founding mosques in England; being invited to be King of Islamestan
- Spouse: Ghazia (formerly Sybil)
- Children: 2
- Father: Gosling Mullander Sheldrake

Khalid Sheldrake (1888–1947), originally Bertram "Bertie" William Sheldrake, was an English pickle manufacturer and philanthropist who later converted to Islam. In 1934, he was briefly declared king of the short-lived state of Islamestan in the Xinjiang region of China during the Warlord era. However, he never took power before the state's defeat.

== Early life ==
Sheldrake was the son of Gosling Mullander Sheldrake (usually called "George"), a condiment manufacturer of southeast London. Sheldrake was raised a Roman Catholic; however, in 1903, he converted to Islam and changed his name to Khalid.

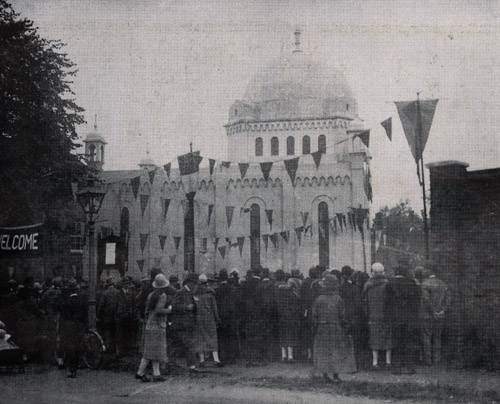
Opening of the Fazl Mosque, London in 1926

In 1920, Sheldrake founded a journal called Britain and India. He also founded the Muslim News Journal and was editor of a monthly magazine called The Minaret. He was awarded an honorary doctorate of literature from Ecuador.

Sheldrake founded mosques in Peckham Rye and East Dulwich in southeast London. He founded the Western Islamic Association, which opened a branch in South Shields in 1930.

Sheldrake married a woman called Sybil, who converted to Islam and changed her name to Ghazia. They had two sons. They made their family home in suburban Forest Hill, London, from which Sheldrake commuted to the family pickle factory in Denmark Hill.

Sheldrake sought to convert fellow-Britons to Islam. In 1932, he conducted the conversion of Gladys Milton Palmer, wife of Bertram Willes Dayrell Brooke, aboard a chartered Imperial Airways 42-seat airliner over the English Channel. Gladys was the daughter of Huntley & Palmers biscuit magnate Walter Palmer, and Brooke was the son of Charles Vyner Brooke, the last Rajah of Sarawak. Sheldrake renamed her "Khair-ul-Nissa" ("Fairest of women").

== King of Islamestan ==
Map of China with the First East Turkestan Republic marked in red

In the early 1930s, a series of rebellions among the mostly Muslim population of Xinjiang deprived the local governor, who had pledged allegiance to the Republic of China, of control of the region. Several short-lived Islamic states were founded, including the First East Turkestan Republic (commonly called the ETR) and the Khotan Emirate. The ETR sought international recognition but was opposed by all powers with influence in the region: China, the United Kingdom, the Soviet Union, Afghanistan and Japan.

In 1933, Sheldrake welcomed an ETR delegation to his home in Forest Hill and accepted their invitation to become overlord of "Sinkiang", soon after he departed for China. En route, he visited Muslim communities in the Philippines, Borneo, Sarawak and Singapore. On 3 October 1933 he reached Hong Kong aboard the US ocean liner President Coolidge.

In Hong Kong, Sheldrake gave a series of lectures on Islam. He confided to a South China Morning Post reporter that he had been offered kingship of "Sinkiang", but swore the reporter to secrecy. The SCMP did not publish the story until 30 March 1934, more than a fortnight after The New York Times had revealed that Sheldrake had accepted the ETR's invitation to become king.

Sheldrake travelled via Shanghai to Beijing, where he arrived in May 1934 and took a room in the CIGH Hotel. Despite Chinese police surveillance an ETR delegation visited Sheldrake at the hotel and repeated their offer to make him their head of state. Sheldrake accepted the title of "His Majesty King Khalid of Islamestan".

Sheldrake then visited Japan and Thailand to fulfil lecture engagements. UK newspapers nicknamed Sheldrake "The Pickle King of Tartary", "The English Emir of Kashgar", "Lord of the Rooftop of the World" and "The Suburban King of Tartary". Ghazia travelled from London to the Far East to join Sheldrake. Together the couple left Beijing and travelled by camel train toward Kashgar, which was to be their capital.

However, by June 1934 Sheldrake's prospects were being undermined by rumours. It was alleged that he wanted to steal Xinjiang's jade deposits, or that he was a British spy, or that were he crowned king, the United Kingdom would control Xinjiang. The Soviet newspaper Izvestia alleged that were Khalid crowned, the British Empire would annex Xinjiang as Japan had done to Manchuria. China and Japan also opposed the intended coronation, and Afghan Muslims withdrew their support.

In early August, the Sheldrakes were approaching Xinjiang but found that the coalition of factions that created the ETR had disintegrated into violence and Soviet-backed forces led by the warlord Sheng Shicai (盛世才) were restoring Chinese control. Without reaching Xinjiang the couple fled to British India with some of the leaders of what had been the ETR. The Sheldrakes stayed in Hyderabad and then returned to England.

== Later life ==
Sheldrake continued to give lectures on Turkestan after his return to Britain but found little interest. He continued to raise funds for new mosques and Muslim charities. He travelled in North Africa and Central Europe, and served his family business by buying sour pickles in Turkey. During World War II, he worked for the British Council in Ankara. He returned to the United Kingdom in 1944 and died in 1947.

== See also ==
- White Rajahs
- Orélie-Antoine de Tounens, a Frenchman who was briefly king of the Kingdom of Araucanía and Patagonia, a short-lived Mapuche state
