= Sir Walter Palmer, 1st Baronet =

British politician

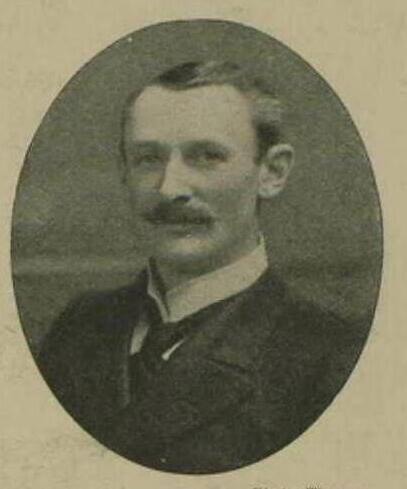
- Born: 4 February 1858
- Died: 16 April 1910 (aged 52); Sunninghill
- Alma mater: University College London
- Occupation: Politician
- Spouse(s): Jean Craig
- Children: Gladys Milton Palmer
- Parent(s): George Palmer; Elizabeth Sarah Meteyard
- Position held: member of the 27th Parliament of the United Kingdom (1900–1906)

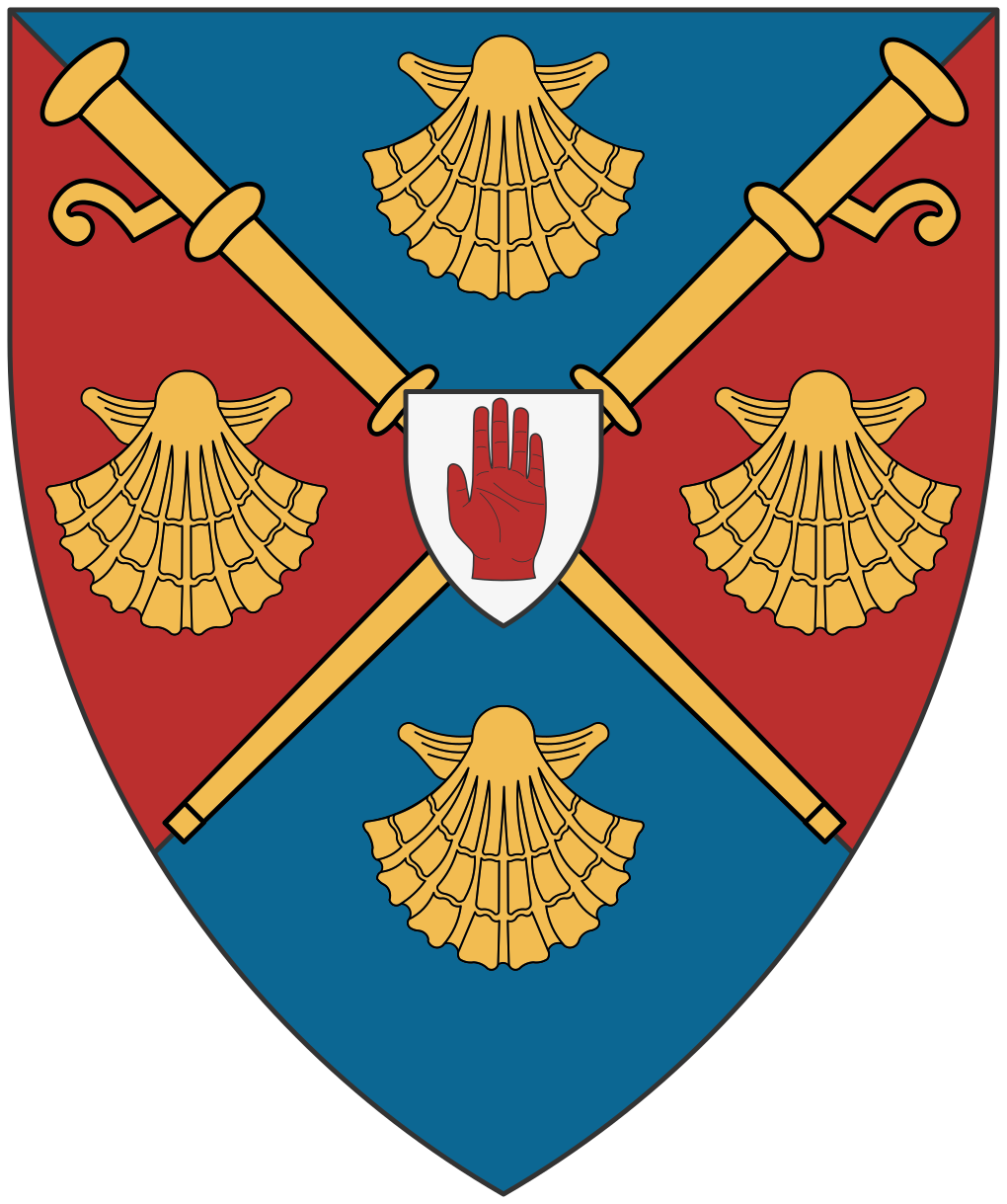
The coat of arms of the Palmer baronets.

Sir Walter Palmer, 1st Baronet (4 February 1858 – 16 April 1910) was a biscuit manufacturer and Conservative Party politician who served in the House of Commons from 1900 to 1906.

Palmer was born in Reading, Berkshire the son of George Palmer who founded the firm of Huntley & Palmer, biscuit manufacturers. He was educated at University College London, and also at the Sorbonne, Paris. He became a director of the firm and was also the first chairman of University College, Reading. In 1900 he was appointed a deputy lieutenant of Berkshire.

In 1900 Palmer was elected Member of Parliament for Salisbury. He lost his seat in the general election of 1906 by the narrow margin of 41 votes. On 25 August 1904 he was made a baronet. From 1901 to 1910, he lived at 50 Grosvenor Square, London.

== Personal life ==
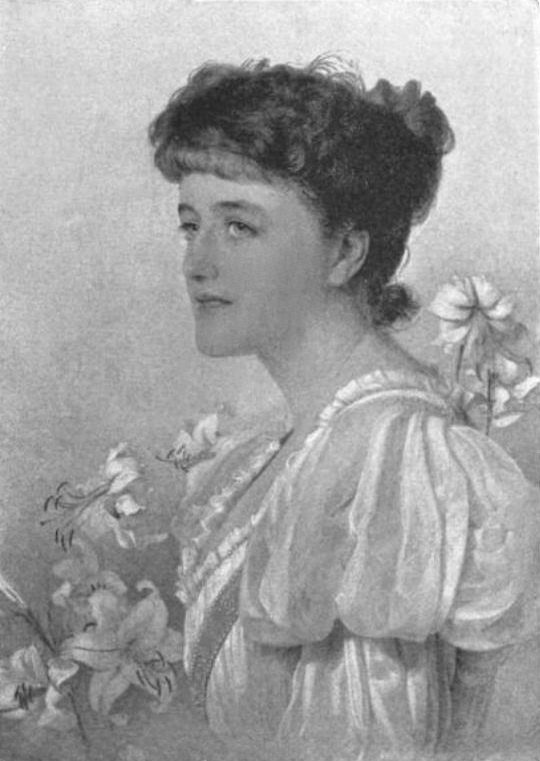
Jean Craig

Palmer married Jean Craig, daughter of William Young Craig. Their daughter, Gladys Milton Palmer, married Bertram Willes Dayrell Brooke, heir-apparent of the White Rajahs of Sarawak, titled "His Highness The Tuan Muda of Sarawak" in 1904. Gladys converted to Islam in 1932.

Palmer died on 16 April 1910 at Sunninghill at the age of 52; the baronetcy became extinct.

Parliament of the United Kingdom
Preceded by Edward Henry Hulse	Member of Parliament for Salisbury; 1900–1906	Succeeded by Edward Tennant
Baronetage of the United Kingdom
New title	Baronet (of Reading, Berkshire); 1904–1910	Extinct
Preceded by Kimber baronets	Palmer baronets of Reading; 25 August 1904	Succeeded by White baronets
