= Reading Borough Libraries =

Reading Borough Libraries are responsible for public library provision in the English town of Reading, Berkshire.

== History ==
Despite the Public Libraries Act 1850 it was not until the 1870s that serious thought was given to the creation of a free public library in Reading. Reading Borough Council could not agree to raise the rate necessary to fund a library and as a result in 1875 William Isaac Palmer, of the Huntley & Palmers biscuit firm decided to personally fund the setting up and running of a Free Library in West Street. This proved very popular and won over opponents of free libraries, leading to the adoption of the Public Libraries Act in Reading in 1877 and the beginning of the library service.

While the contents of Reading Free Library were donated by Palmer to the borough, it was decided that a new building was needed. A new library was included in the plans drawn up in 1879 for an extension to the Reading Town Hall which would also include a new museum (later to become the Museum of Reading). This new Library opened in October 1882 and soon proved very popular.

In 1974, under the Local Government Act 1972, responsibility for library services was transferred to Berkshire County Council, which was itself abolished in 1996 as part of a local government reform, and the functions returned to the borough council.

Gradually library provision extended throughout Reading with the building of more libraries in other parts of the town. Today the library service has seven branches and also runs the library service in Reading Remand Centre.
