= Bertram Brooke =

- Tuan Muda of Sarawak
- Born: 8 August 1876; Kuching, Raj of Sarawak
- Died: 15 September 1965 (aged 89); Weybridge, Surrey, England, United Kingdom
- Spouse: Gladys Milton Palmer (m. 1904; died 1952)
- Issue: Jean Margaret Palmer Brooke; Elizabeth Brooke; Anne Elaine Primula Brooke; Anthony Walter Dayrell Brooke
Names
- Bertram Willes Dayrell
- Family: Brooke
- Father: Charles, Rajah of Sarawak
- Mother: Margaret, Ranee of Sarawak

Bertram Willes Dayrell Brooke (8 August 1876 – 15 September 1965), was the last heir apparent to the Raj of Sarawak.

== Life ==
Bertram Brooke was the son of Charles Brooke, the second of White Rajah of the Raj of Sarawak, and a brother of Charles Vyner Brooke, the third and last White Rajah. For some years he was heir presumptive to his brother. On 18 October 1950, he relinquished his rights of succession in favour of his son Anthony Brooke. He held the title of "Tuan Muda" (literally "Young Lord") and the style of "His Highness".

Brooke was educated at Winchester College and at Trinity College, Cambridge. He was president of Cambridge University Boat Club, rowing in The Boat Race in 1900 and 1901, and was a member of the Pitt Club. He went on to serve in the Royal Horse Artillery during the First World War and act as Special Commissioner from Sarawak to the UK.

Brooke married Gladys Milton Palmer on 28 June 1904. She was the only child of Sir Walter Palmer, 1st Baronet. As wife of the Tuan Muda, Gladys took the title of "Dayang Muda" and the style of "Her Highness". The couple had one son, Anthony, titular Rajah Muda of Sarawak, and three daughters.

== See also ==
- List of Cambridge University Boat Race crews

Bertram Brooke Brooke family Born: 8 August 1876 Died: 15 September 1965
Preceded by Vyner	Heir to the Kingdom of Sarawak; 24 May 1917 – 25 August 1937	Succeeded by Anthony Brooke
