= Tuan Muda of Sarawak =

The Tuan Muda of Sarawak was the title of the heir presumptive to the Rajah of Sarawak. It literally means "Little Lord". The wife of the Tuan Muda was known the Dayang Muda. Bertram Brooke (1876–1965) was the last person to be titled Tuan Muda of Sarawak.
