= Morgan MacRae =

Welsh rugby union player

- Born: Morgan MacRae; 13 November 2001 (age 25) Reading, England
- Height: 1.80 m (5 ft 11 in)
- Weight: 98 kg (15 st 6 lb)

Rugby union career
- Position: Hooker
- Current team: Henley Hawks
Senior career
Years	Team	Apps	(Points)
2021–2022	Scarlets	2	(0)
2022–2024	Henley Hawks		
2024–	Rams		
- Correct as of 2 June 2025
National sevens team
Years	Team		Comps
2022	Wales Sevens		1
- Correct as of 23 January 2022

Morgan MacRae (born 13 November 2001) is a Welsh rugby union player for Rams RFC. MacRae's primary position is hooker. MacRae previously played for the Scarlets and the Henley Hawks.

== Professional career ==
MacRae was named in the Scarlets academy squad for the 2021–22 season. MacRae made two appearances for the Scarlets development side in 2021, against the Dragons and Ospreys. At the end of the season, MacRae departed the Scarlets and rejoined Henley Hawks.

MacRae has represented Wales Sevens at one tournament.
