= William Isaac Palmer =

Member of the Palmer family

William Isaac Palmer (1824–1893) was a member of the Palmer family, proprietors of the Huntley & Palmers biscuit manufacturers of Reading in England. He was the brother of George Palmer, the first of the Palmer family to be involved in the firm, and became a partner in the firm on Thomas Huntley's death in 1857.

In 1875 William Isaac Palmer personally funded the setting up and running of a Free Library in Reading's West Street, an establishment that was to become the forerunner of the Reading Public Library.

In 1876, he purchased Hoxton Hall, in Hoxton, Hackney (a former music hall), on behalf of the "Blue Ribbon Gospel Temperance Mission". Palmer spent much of his fortune on charity, and on his death, his brothers were forced to make good his many promises of donations.
