= Joseph Huntley =

English 19th-century biscuit maker and innovator (1775–1849)

- Born: 1775
- Died: 1857 (aged 81–82)
- Occupation: biscuit maker

The London Street Bakery in the 1830s by Reginald Mills (1948)

Joseph Huntley (1775–1857) was an English 19th-century biscuit maker and innovator, who lived in the English town of Reading. In 1822 he founded a small biscuit baker and confectioner shop at number 72 London Street.

== Business ==
At this time, London Street was the main stage coach route from London to Bristol, Bath and the West Country. One of the main calling points of the stage coaches was the Crown Inn, opposite Joseph Huntley's shop and he started selling his biscuits to the travellers on the coaches. Because the biscuits were vulnerable to breakage on the coach journey, he started putting them in a metal tin. Out of this innovation grew two businesses: Joseph (the elder's) biscuit shop that was to become the famous biscuit manufacturer Huntley & Palmers, and Huntley, Bourne and Stevens, a firm of biscuit tin manufacturers founded by his younger son, also called Joseph. In 1838, Joseph Huntley was forced by ill-health to retire, handing control of the shop to his older son Thomas Huntley, who was joined in partnership by George Palmer.
