= Pamela Wolfe =

New Zealand artist and children's book illustrator

Pamela June Wolfe
- Born: June 1, 1950 (age 76); Reading, Berkshire, England
- Education: Elam School of Fine Arts
- Occupations: Artist and children's book illustrator
- Known for: Painting

Pamela June Wolfe (born 1 June 1950) is a New Zealand artist and children's book illustrator.

== Life ==
Wolfe was born in Reading, Berkshire, England, in 1950 and emigrated to New Zealand in 1953. She studied at Elam School of Fine Arts at Auckland University from 1968 to 1971, graduating with a Diploma of Fine Arts. Her painting style is bright, direct and colourful, often depicting flowers, birds and the New Zealand coastline. Her paintings are often commissioned for the promotion of New Zealand overseas and for well-known environmental groups.

=== Publications ===
Works illustrated by Wolfe include:

- Midnight at the Museum (1997), Scholastic New Zealand
- Mouse Opera (1999), Scholastic New Zealand
- Mouse Hotel (2000), Random House New Zealand
- Walter's Planets (2001), Random House New Zealand
- Mouse on the Moon (2003), Scholastic New Zealand

=== Recognition ===
Midnight at the Museum was a finalist at the New Zealand Post Children’s Book Awards in 1998, and Mouse Opera was a finalist in 2000. Mouse Hotel was included in “The White Ravens 2001: A selection of international Children’s & Youth Literature exhibited at the Bologna Children's Book Fair 2001". Mouse on the Moon was a finalist at the Russell Clark Awards in 2004.
