= William Albert Smallcombe =

Writer and curator of Reading Museum

William Albert Smallcombe

William Albert Smallcombe (13 November 1892 – 15 January 1992) was a writer, curator of Reading Museum, and a prominent figure in Reading, Berkshire.

== Personal life ==
Smallcombe was born in Bristol, Gloucestershire to James and Elizabeth Ann (née Johnson). He was married to Elsie May Victoria Dowling.

== Life in Reading ==
=== Reading Museum ===
Between 1926 and 1957, Smallcombe was the Curator of Reading Museum, and for a brief period, Director. During his time there, Smallcombe encouraged the development of natural history, believing in displaying living natural history, such as an ant's nest which could be viewed between who pieces of glass and an observation beehive. Smallcombe transformed the museum, focusing it on local history, natural history, and archaeology.

He was a keen zoologist and active in local history projects. He oversaw the expansion of the museum in the 1950s. Smallcombe was also a keen archaeologist, and in the 1930s, collected items during an excavation of Denton's Pit.

=== Societies ===
Smallcombe, alongside artist and Professor of Fine Art and the University of Reading, Allen Seaby, founded the Reading Guild of Artists in March 1930.

Between 1941 and 1944, Smallcombe was appointed as President of the Reading and District Natural History Society. Through this, he founded the Young Naturalists' Evenings which were held annually at Reading Town Hall for twelve years.

=== Local Education ===
Smallcombe was active in all levels of education in Reading. In 1931, Smallcombe established the still popular loan scheme for schools. After his retirement in 1975, he contributed to the University of Reading's teaching of science for student teachers, alongside this, he produced courses for teachers from Commonwealth countries. Smallcombe also ran film evenings in the art gallery usually for Reading school children.

== Later life and death ==
After retirement in 1957, Smallcombe was made an Honorary Curator at the Cavella Museum in Silchester.

In 1968, he founded the Reading Pre-Retirement Association which aimed to run courses to help those aged 55 and over to prepare for retirement. Smallcombe also involved in the Berkshire Retirement Association and the Rotary Club.

In January 1992, Smallcombe died in Reading. He was described by Brian Baker in his obituary as 'a kindly man, much respected in his profession', and was credited for the Reading and District Natural History Society's close and long relationship with Reading Museum.

== Publications ==
- W. A. Smallcombe, Archaeology for Young People, Harrap, 1961.
- W. A. Smallcombe and A. E. P. Collins, 'The Late George W. Smith of Reading, Berkshire', Archaeological Journal, vol. 49, 1946, p. 62
