= George Palmer (businessman) =

English businessman (1818–1897)

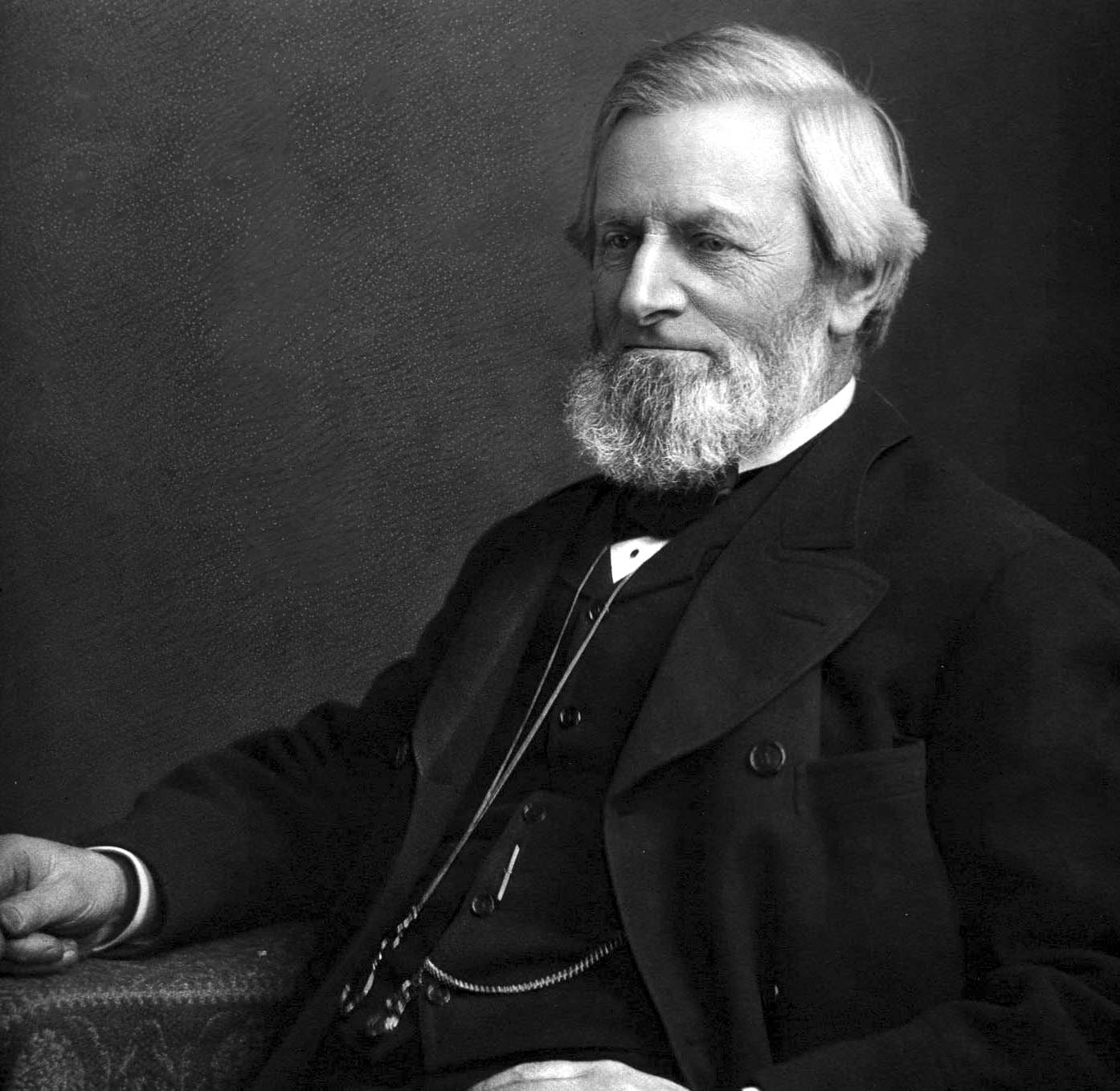
- Born: 18 January 1818
- Died: 19 August 1897 (aged 79)
- Occupations: MP; biscuit manufacturer
- Known for: Owner of Huntley & Palmers

George Palmer (18 January 1818 – 19 August 1897) was a British entrepreneur, being mostly known as proprietor of the Huntley & Palmers biscuit manufacturers of Reading in England.

== Family life ==
Palmer was born in Long Sutton in Somerset, the eldest son of William Palmer and his wife, Mary, the daughter of William Isaac of Sturminster Newton in Dorset. Both were Quaker families. His wife was a first cousin of Cyrus Clark and James Clark who founded the shoemakers C. & J. Clark.

His father died in 1826, and he was educated at Sidcot School near Weston-super-Mare, before becoming an apprentice to his uncle, who was a miller and confectioner.

He married Elizabeth Sarah Meteyard in 1850. They had had six sons and four daughters. One daughter Emily married the evolutionary biologist Edward Bagnall Poulton, whilst his daughter Alice married the physiologist Augustus Desire Wallace. Through Emily, he was the great-grandfather of Labour politician Peggy Jay.

Palmer's wife died in 1894, and he died of a stroke at home three years later.

== Business ==
Palmer went into business with a cousin Thomas Huntley in 1841, after Thomas's father Joseph Huntley, the founder of the business in 1822, was forced to retire through ill-health, and it became apparent that Thomas Huntley did not have his father's good sense of business. The firm was renamed Huntley & Palmers.

Whilst it was Joseph Huntley's innovation in the introduction of the biscuit tin and in the sale of biscuits to stage coach travellers that created the business, George Palmer is generally credited with making it a major Victorian success through industrial manufacturing techniques, and by using the railways for distribution. With the engineer William Exall, Palmer invented new machinery to manufacture biscuits on an industrial scale.

When Thomas Huntley died, in 1857, George Palmer was joined in the business by two brothers, William Isaac Palmer and Samuel Palmer. The turnover of the business had increased from £2,700 in 1841 to £125,000 in 1857. He was later joined by his son, George William Palmer. Two other sons of George and four of his nephews, sons of Samuel, later became partners in the business. By the time of his death in 1897, the business had an annual turnover of more than £1.25 million, selling around 23,000 tons of biscuits each year. The company claimed to be the largest manufacturer of biscuit in the world.

== Politics ==
In addition to his business career, George Palmer was involved in politics. He served in the local council in Reading from 1850, was as mayor of Reading in 1857–58, and represented the town in parliament. He served as Liberal Member of Parliament for the Parliamentary Borough of Reading from 1878 until 1885, when the two-member seat was reduced to one member. Palmer stood as a candidate for the new constituency of Newbury in 1885, one of three created from the former county seat of Berkshire, but he was not elected. His son George William Palmer was twice elected to represent Reading, serving from 1892 to 1895 and from 1898 to 1904.

Palmer's country estate was Marlston House in Bucklebury. He donated the 49 acres of land to Reading which became Palmer Park.

== Statue ==
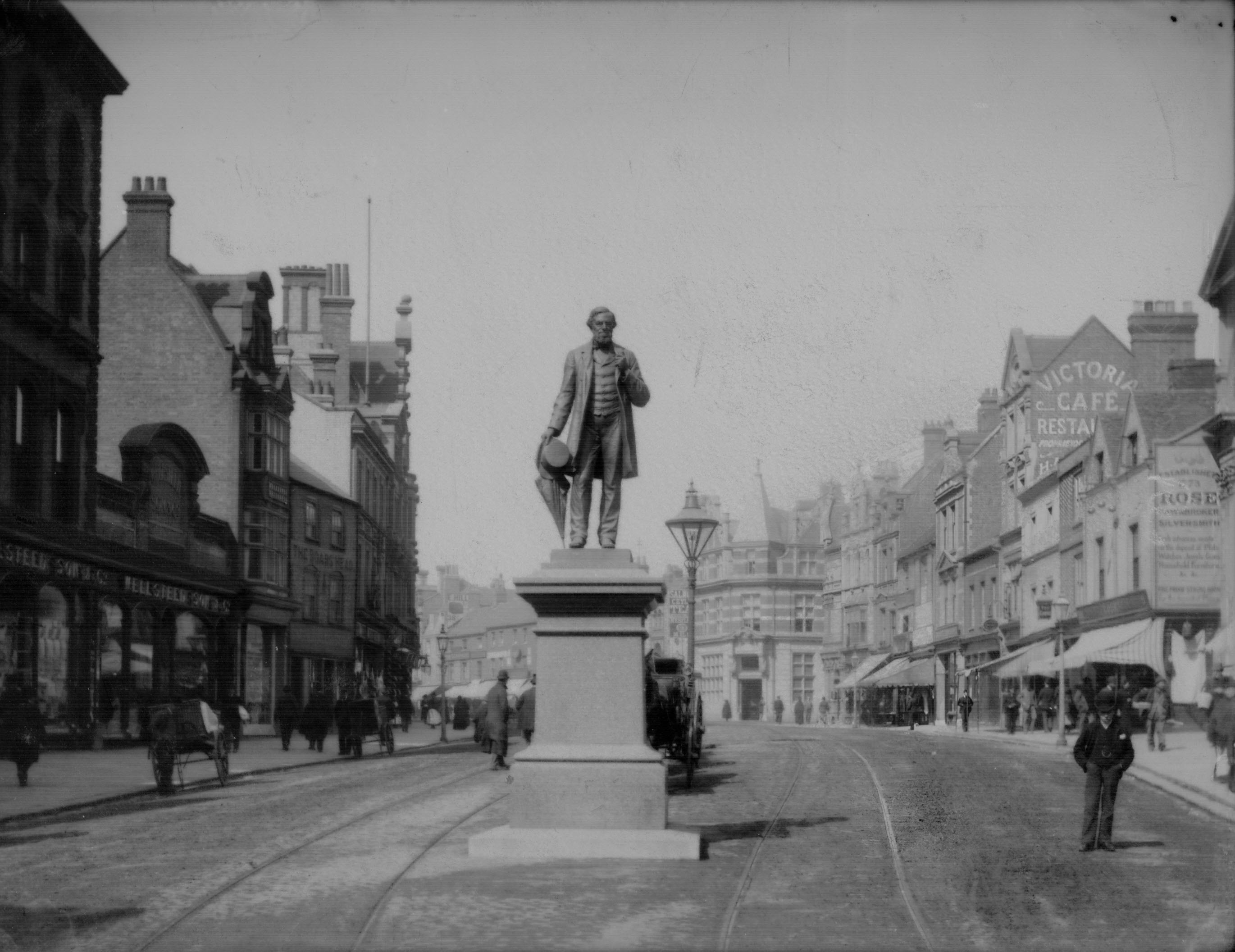
The statue of Palmer in Broad Street, c. 1890 by Henry Taunt

The statue of George Palmer which now stands in Palmer Park was by sculptor George Blackall Simonds and originally sited in Broad Street. It was unveiled in 1891, the same day that Palmer Park opened. The same year, Palmer was given the freedom of Reading, and declined the offer of a baronetcy. The statue was moved c. 1930 to its current location as it caused traffic congestion.

== Sources ==
- Penguin Pocket On This Day. Penguin Reference Library. 2006. ISBN 0-14-102715-0.
- Courtney, William Prideaux (1901). "Palmer, George (1818-1897)" . In Lee, Sidney (ed.). Dictionary of National Biography (1st supplement). London: Smith, Elder & Co.
- Bradley, Ian Campbell (1987). Enlightened Entrepreneurs. London: Weidenfeld & Nicolson. ISBN 0-297-79054-4

Parliament of the United Kingdom
| Preceded by George Shaw-Lefevre; Sir Francis Goldsmid | Member of Parliament for Reading; 1878 – 1885; With: George Shaw-Lefevre | Succeeded by Charles Townshend Murdoch |
