= Huntley & Palmers =

English biscuit manufacturing company

Coordinates: 51°27′18.65″N 0°57′43.9″W

- Type: Private (1822–1921)
- Industry: Food
- Founded: 1822; 204 years ago
- Founder: Joseph Huntley
- Fate: Merged with Peek Freans to form Associated Biscuits Ltd. in 1921, which was acquired by Nabisco in 1982; Resumed operations in 2006
- Headquarters: Reading (1822–1970); Sudbury (2006–pres.), England
- Key people: George Palmer (1841–97); William Isaac Palmer; George W. Palmer
- Products: Biscuits
- Website: huntleyandpalmers.com

Huntley & Palmers is a British company of biscuit makers originally based in Reading, Berkshire. Formed by Joseph Huntley in 1822, the company became one of the world's first global brands (chiefly led by George Palmer who joined in 1841) and ran what was once the world's largest biscuit factory. The biscuits were sold in elaborately decorated biscuit tins. In 1900, the company's products were sold in 172 countries; further, their global reach saw their advertising posters feature scenes from around the world. Over the years, the company was also known as "J. Huntley & Son" and "Huntley & Palmer".

In 2006, the Huntley & Palmers company was re-established in Sudbury, Suffolk. Since 1985, the New Zealand firm Griffin's Foods has made Huntley and Palmers biscuits under licence.

In 2017, conservators found a 106-year-old fruitcake from the company in the artefacts from Cape Adare. The cake is believed to have been part of the rations of Captain Robert Falcon Scott's Terra Nova Expedition in 1910–1913.

== History ==
=== Beginnings ===
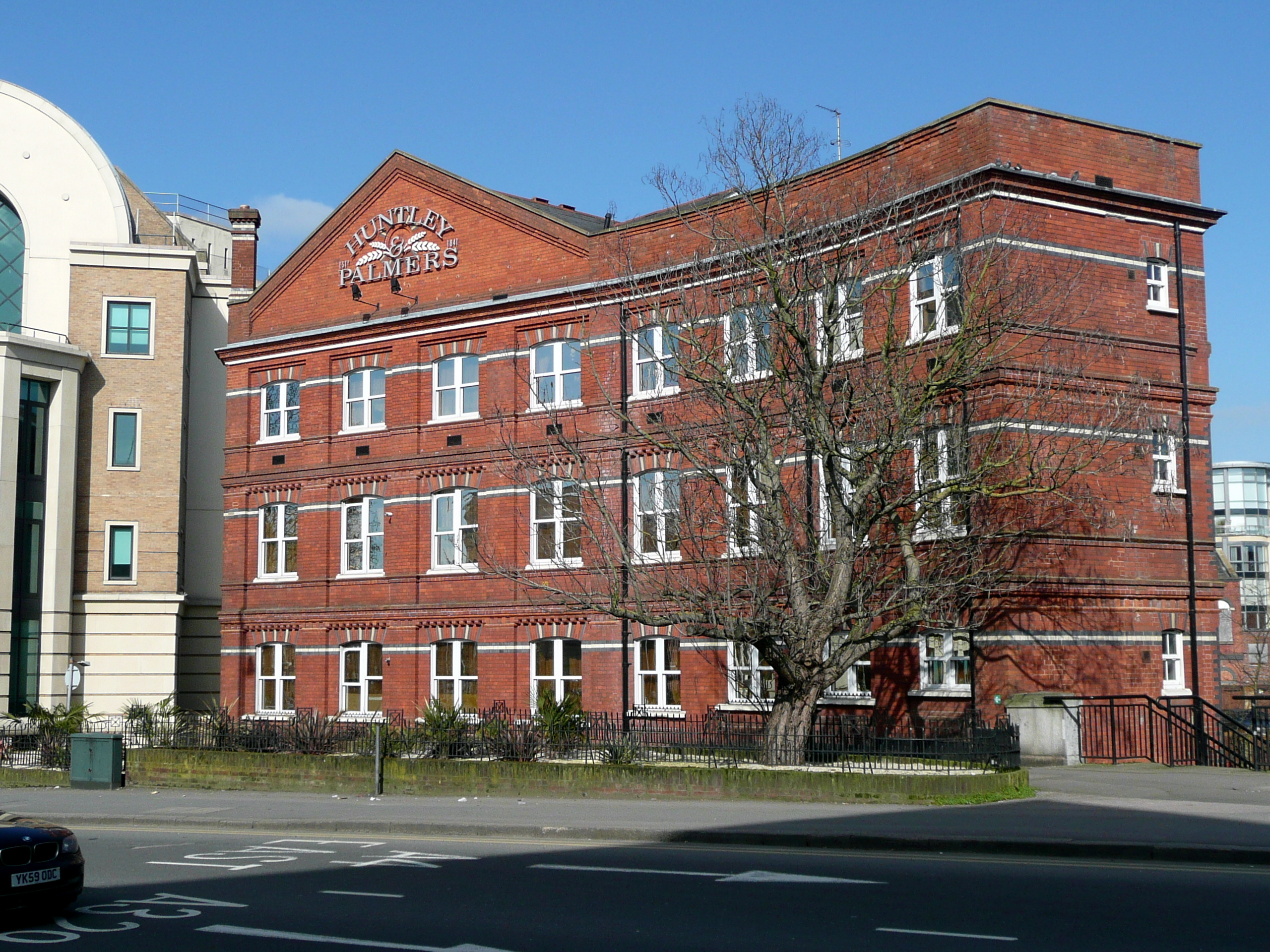
The original Huntley & Palmers factory in Reading, pictured in 2011

Huntley & Palmers was founded in 1822 by Joseph Huntley as J. Huntley & Son. Initially, the business was a small biscuit baker and confectioner shop at number 119 London Street, Reading, Berkshire. A blue plaque is displayed outside. At this time, London Street was the main stage coach route from London to Bristol, Bath and the West Country.

One of the main calling points of the stage coaches was the Crown Inn, opposite Joseph Huntley's shop, and he started selling his biscuits to the travellers on the coaches. Because the biscuits were vulnerable to breakage on the coach journey, he started putting them in metal tins. Out of this innovation grew two businesses: Joseph's biscuit shop that was to become Huntley & Palmers, and Huntley, Boorne, and Stevens, a firm of biscuit tin manufacturers founded by his younger son, also called Joseph.

=== George Palmer ===
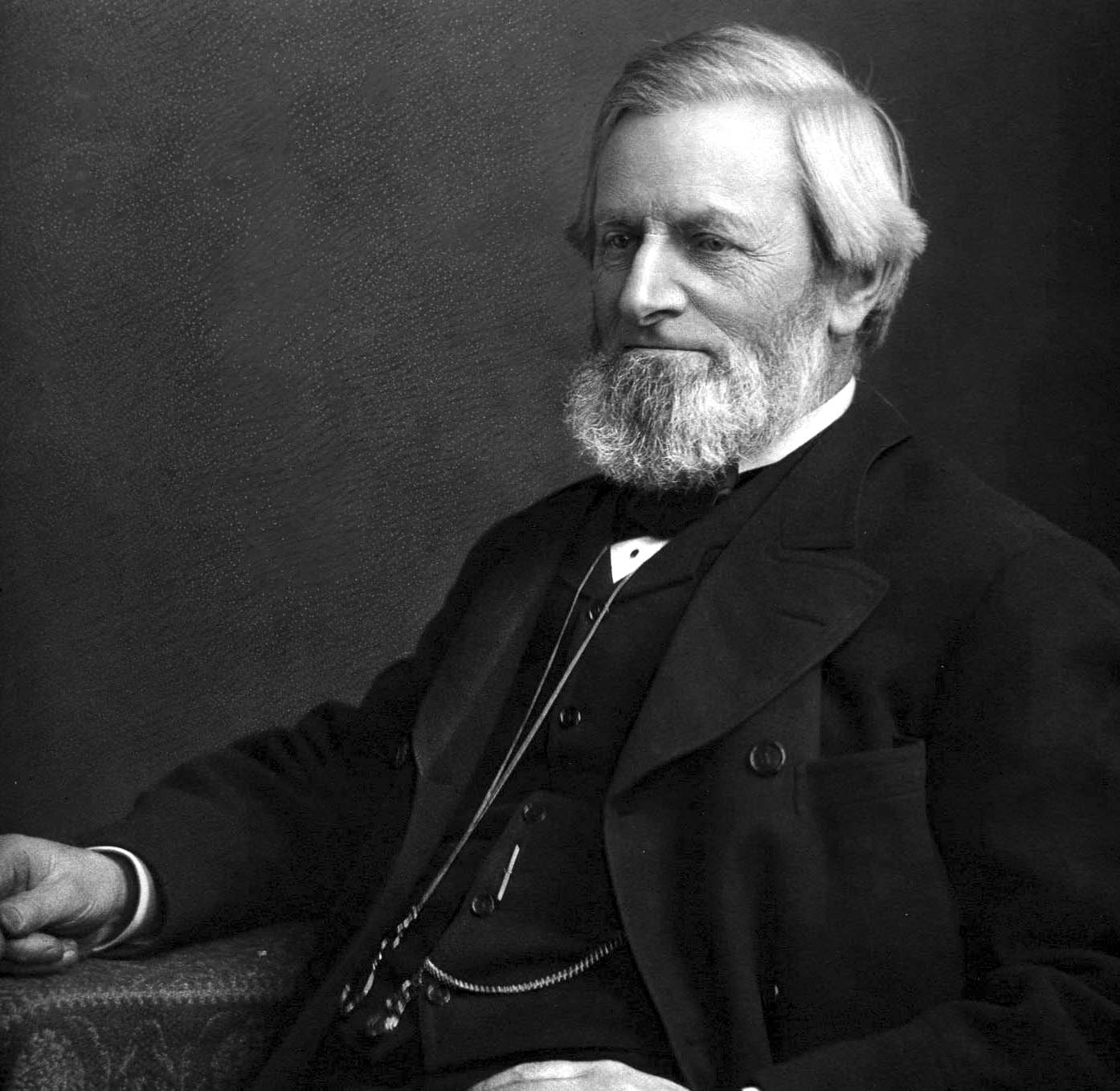
George Palmer joined the company after Huntley was forced to retire in 1838, being aided by his brothers and son to lead the business

In 1838, Joseph Huntley was forced by ill-health to retire, handing control of the business to his older son Thomas. In 1841, Thomas took as a business partner George Palmer, a distant cousin and a Quaker. George Palmer soon became the chief force behind its success, establishing sales agents across the country. The company soon outgrew its original shop and moved to a factory on King's Road in 1846, near the Great Western Railway. The factory had an internal railway system with its own steam locomotives and one of these has been preserved near Bradford.

Thomas Huntley died in 1857, but George Palmer continued to direct the firm successfully aided by his brothers, William Isaac Palmer and Samuel Palmer, and subsequently by his sons, as heads of the company. They became biscuit makers to the British royal family.

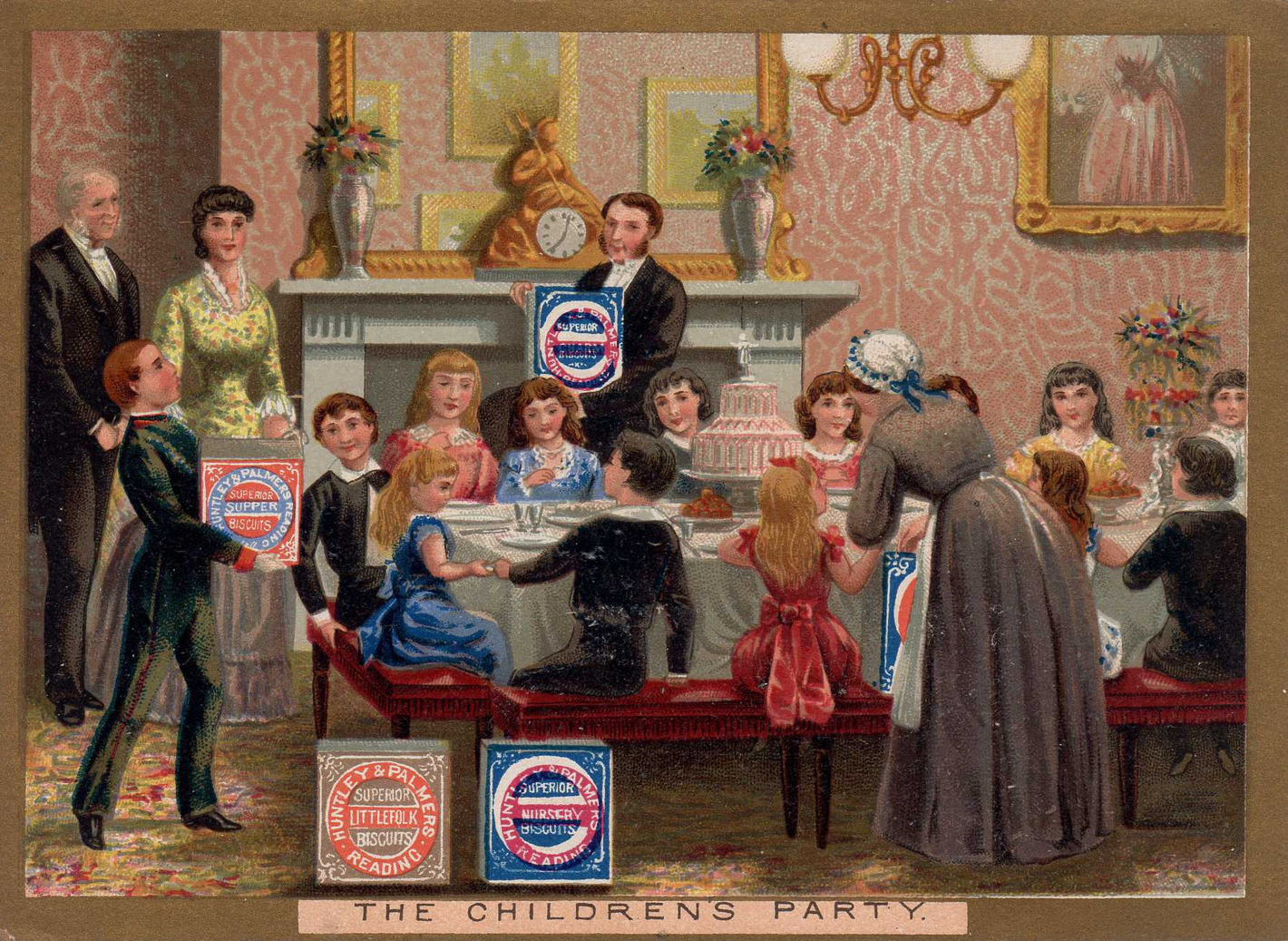
"The Children's Party" trade card with Huntley & Palmers biscuits in late Victorian England

In 1865, the company expanded into the European continent, and received royal warrants from Napoleon III and Leopold II of Belgium. At their height, they employed over 5,000 people and became the world's largest biscuit firm in 1900. The origins of the firm's success lay in a number of areas. They provided a wide variety of popular products, producing 400 different varieties by 1903, and mass production enabled them to price their products keenly. One source of flour was Hambleden Mill, a few miles down the Thames. Every week a barge, Maid of the Mill, brought flour upriver from the mill.

Huntley & Palmers exhibited at many World Exhibitions throughout the 19th century. At the Exposition Universelle (1878), they were awarded the grand prix in the biscuits and pastries category, honoured as an "unrivalled house, known throughout the world for its enormous output and for the excellent quality of its products".

The Palmers were notable local figures in Reading who generously gave money and land to Reading, including Palmer Park and the town was often known as "biscuit town". Reading F.C. football team was also known as the "biscuit men". The company provided free biscuits for first-class rail travellers from Paddington, urging them to look out for the works in Reading.

=== Exports ===
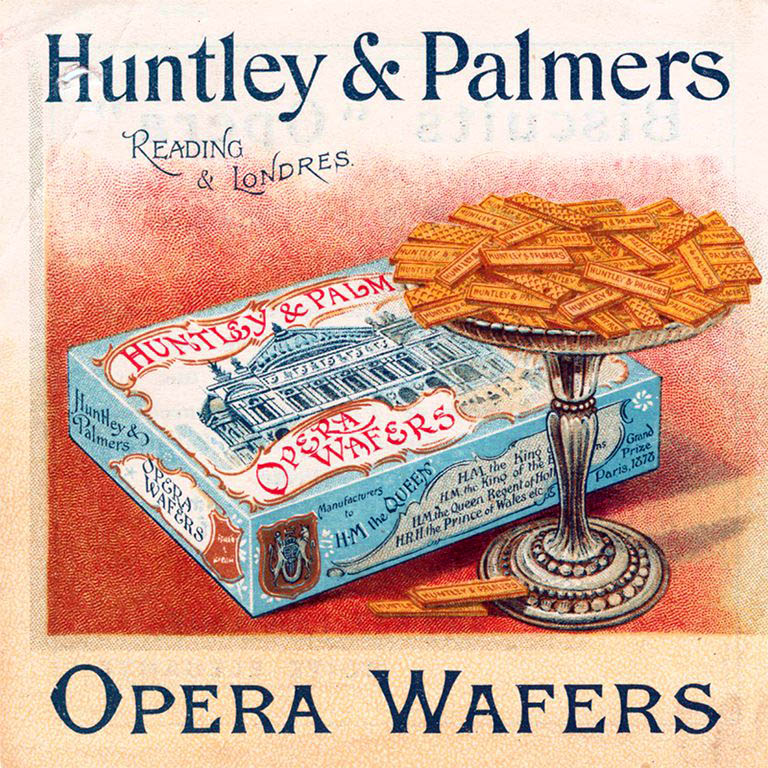
Advertising for the Opera wafers c. 1890

Another important part of their success was their ability to send biscuits all over the world in collectible biscuit tins. The tins proved to be a useful marketing tool, and under their easily recognisable image Huntley & Palmers biscuits came to symbolise some of the commercial power and reach of the British Empire. In 1900, Huntley & Palmers biscuits were sold in 172 countries. Their advertising posters featured scenes from around the world.

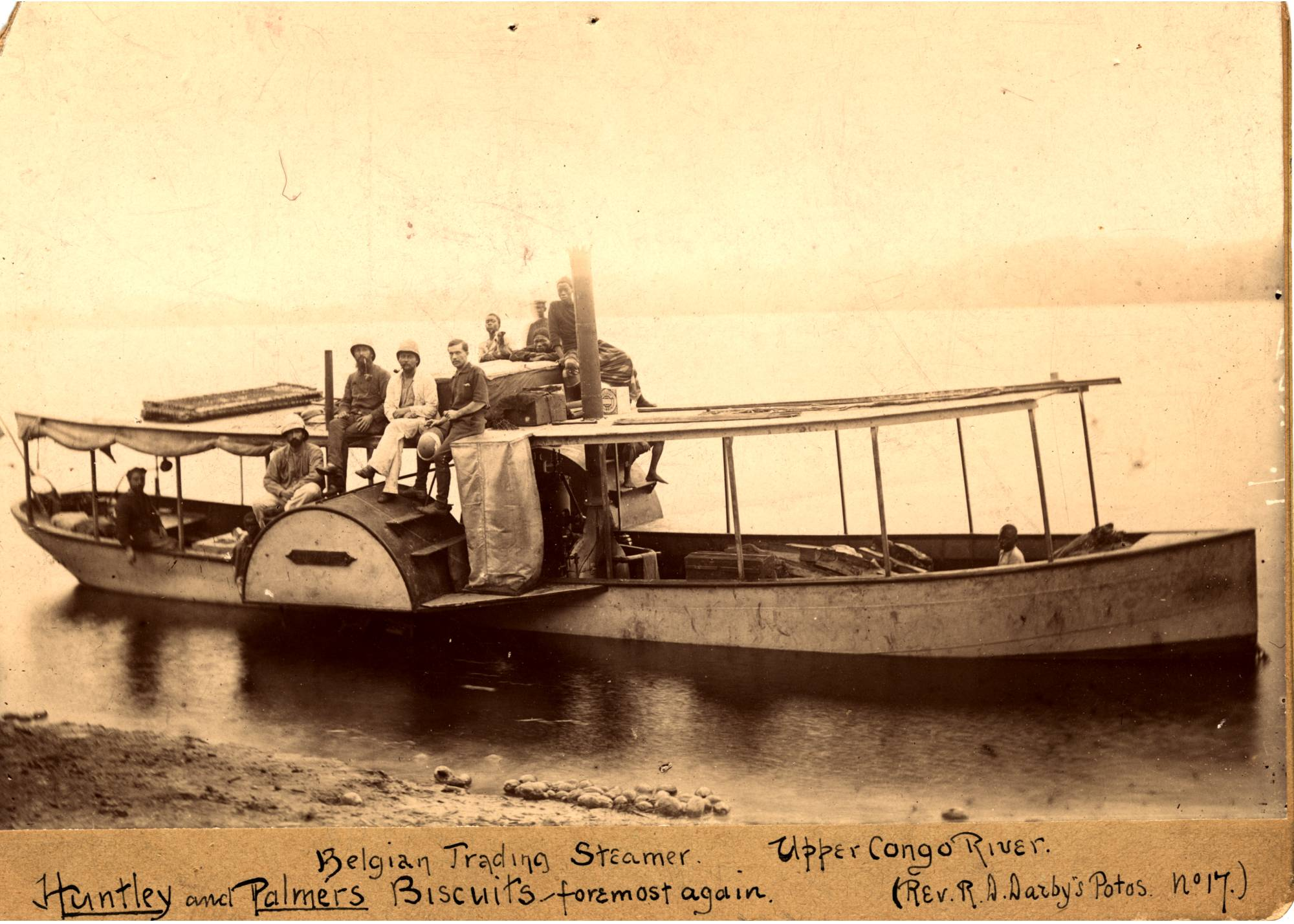
Huntley & Palmers biscuit tin on a Congo trading steamer, Upper Congo River, c. 1890

The tins found their way as far abroad as the heart of Africa and the mountains of Tibet; the company even provided biscuits to Captain Scott during his 1910 expedition to the South Pole. During the First World War they produced biscuits for the war effort and devoted their tin-making resources to making cases for artillery shells.

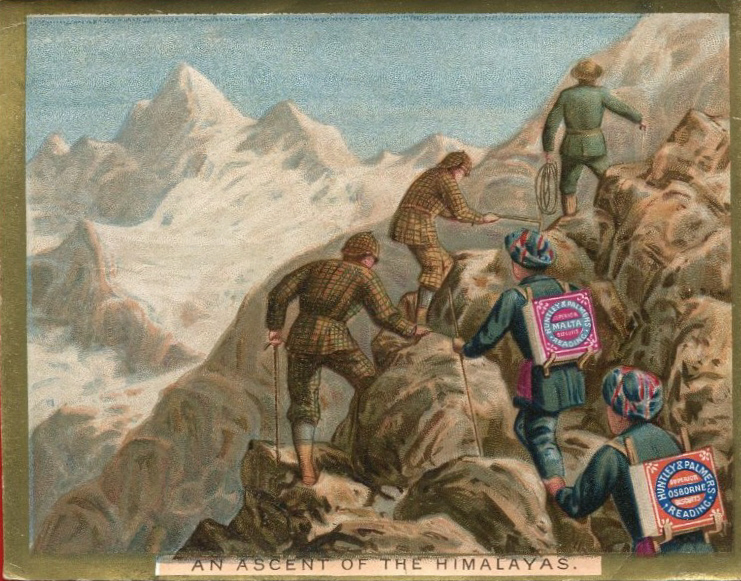
"An ascent of the Himalayas", Huntley & Palmers trade card at the turn of the 19/20th century

In 1921, Huntley & Palmers accept the invitation from London's Peek Frean to merge so both firms formed a holding company, "Associated Biscuits Manufacturers Ltd." with a capital of 2.5 million. In 1960, W.R. Jacob of Liverpool joined Associated Biscuits.

In 1969, following the merger of the Scottish biscuit companies, Crawford's, McVitie's and McFarlane Lang (forming United Biscuits) and in order to respond to that market competition, the three main English biscuit manufacturers Huntley & Palmers, Peek Frean and Jacobs reorganised their biscuit production as "Associated Biscuits Ltd".

Manufacturing in Reading ceased in 1976. In 1982, Nabisco acquired Associated Biscuits. Production continued at Huyton until 1983. After the closure of the Peek Frean factory at Bermondsey in 1989, Nabisco sold the Associated Biscuit brands (Huntley and Palmers, Peek Frean, and Jacobs) to Danone.

The firm manufactured over 400 different types of biscuits over the years and innovated many new types of biscuits including the Nice biscuit.

=== Archives ===
A history of the company, Quaker Enterprise in Biscuits: Huntley & Palmers of Reading, 1822–1972 by T. A. B. Corley, was published in 1972 on the firm's 150th anniversary. The historic company archive is now housed at the Reading Museum, where there is a gallery devoted to the company. Some archive films of the Huntley & Palmers factory are available for viewing in the special Huntley & Palmers gallery in the museum in the Town Hall. The business's archive is located at the Special Collections of the University of Reading.

=== Hidden images ===
It came to light that one freelance artist commissioned to design biscuit tins for Huntley & Palmers (including one based on an original artwork by Kate Greenaway) had placed secret images in his designs, such as depictions of copulating dogs, copulating people, and a man with a cannabis joint during the 1970s.

=== Re-establishment ===
In 2006, Huntley & Palmers resumed operations from Sudbury, Suffolk. The management team included a former marketing director of Jacobs Bakery, which once owned the company, and a founder of Vibrant, a successful packaging design company. They targeted the speciality and fine food sector.

Since 2008, Huntley and Palmers have been owned by the Freeman family, with three generations in the biscuit business. Their aim is to bring the name of Huntley and Palmers back into the mainstream, with several products ranges focusing on different market sectors, and including, once again, biscuit tins.

== Gallery ==
Huntley & Palmers biscuit tins
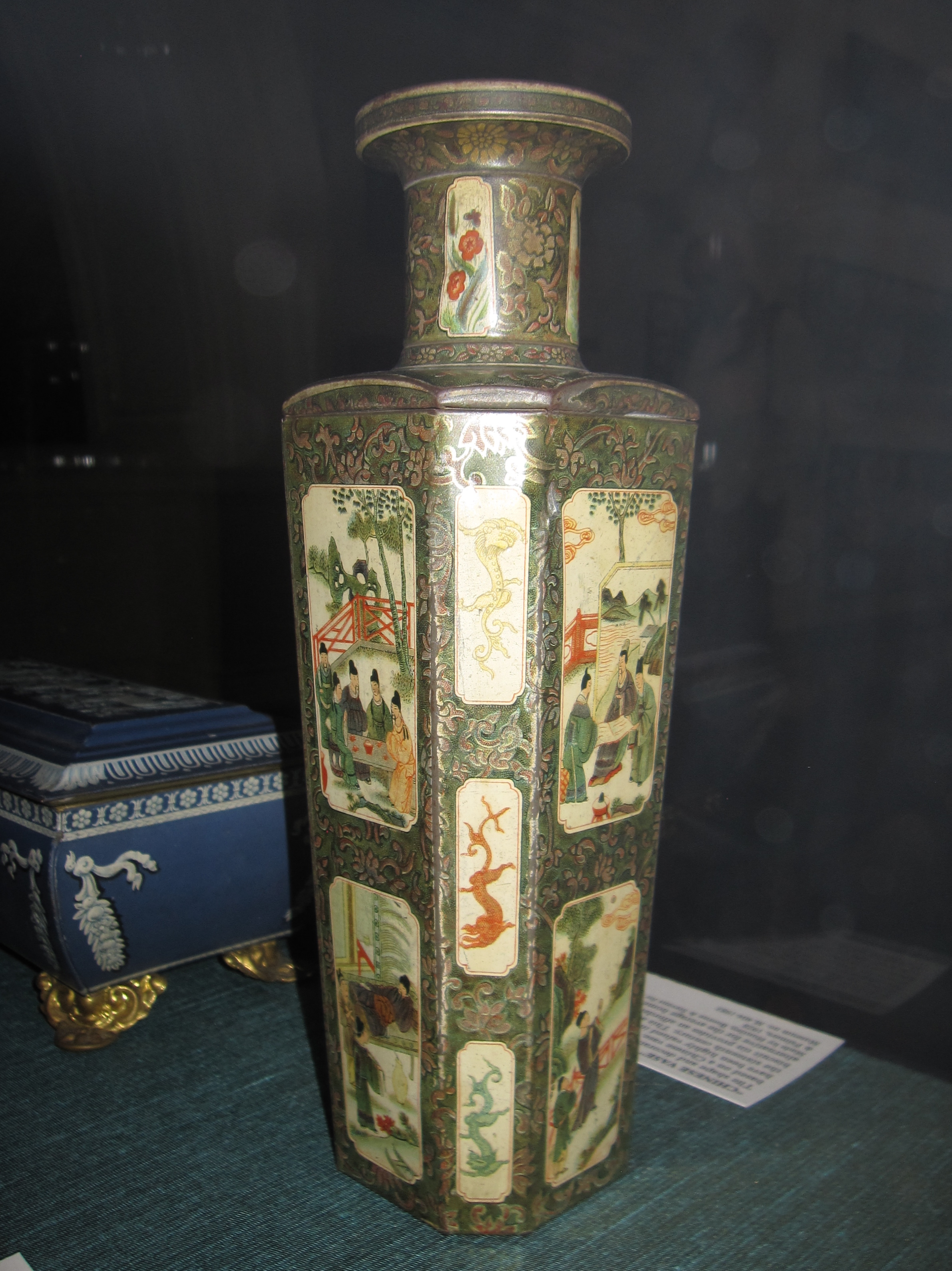

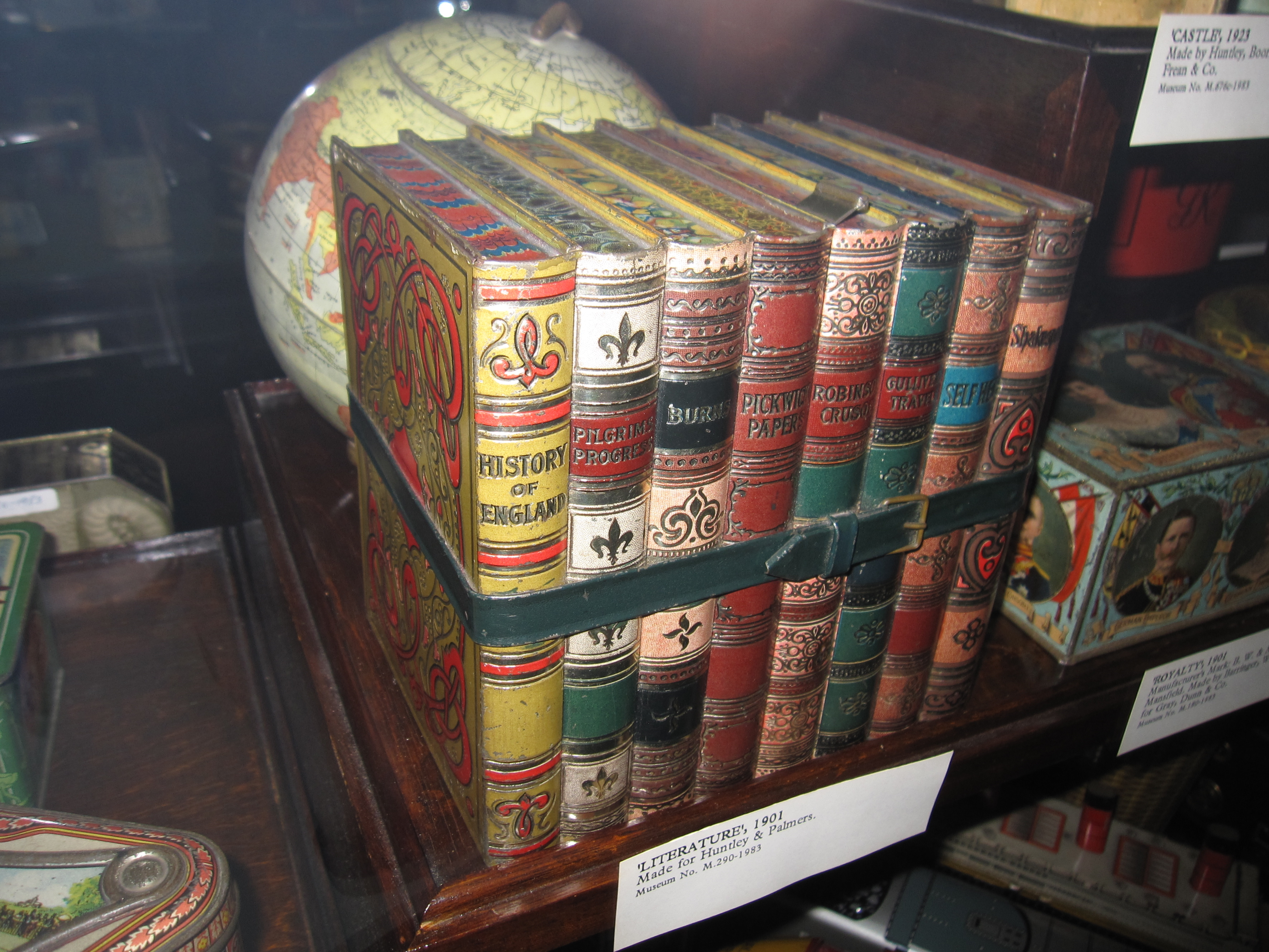

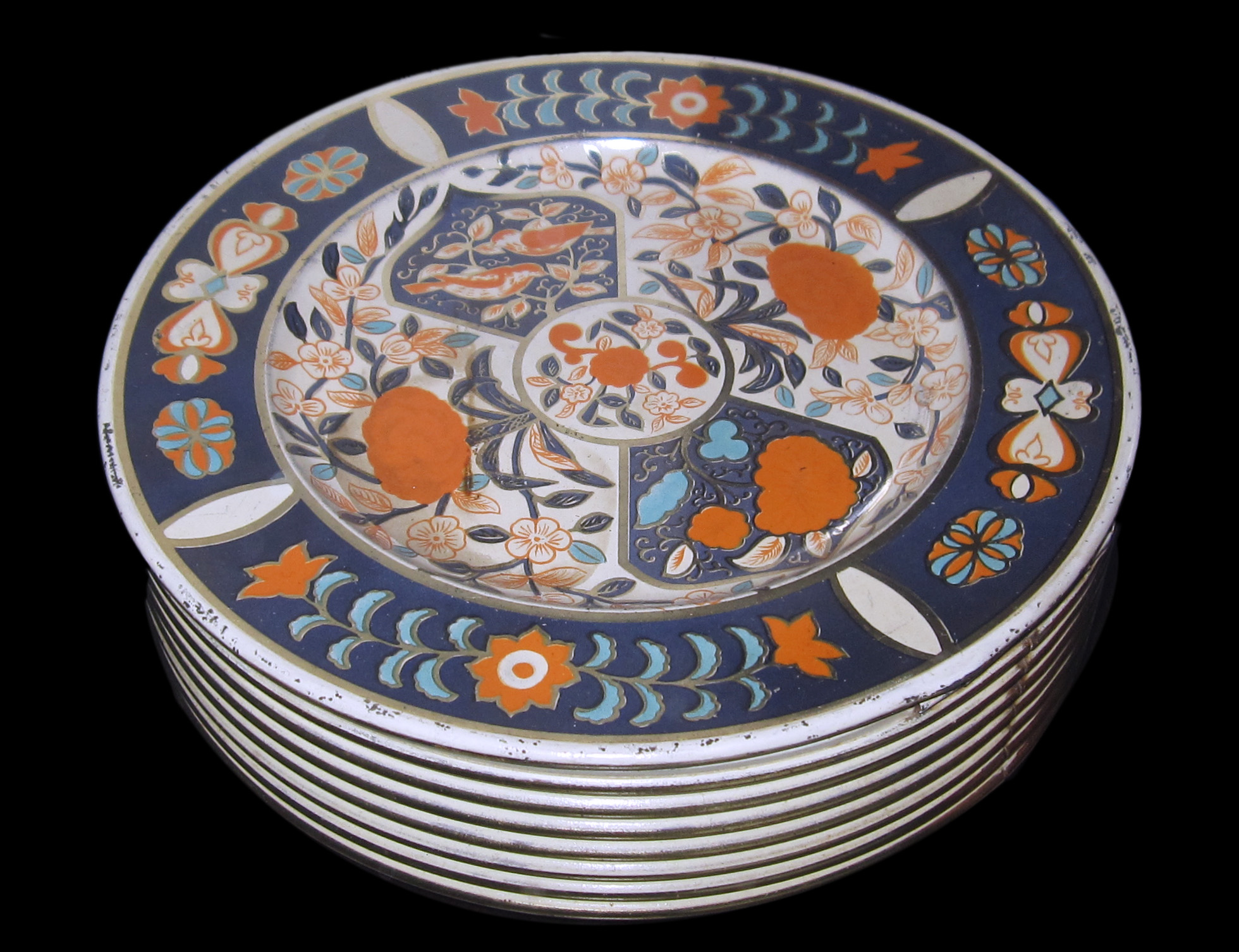

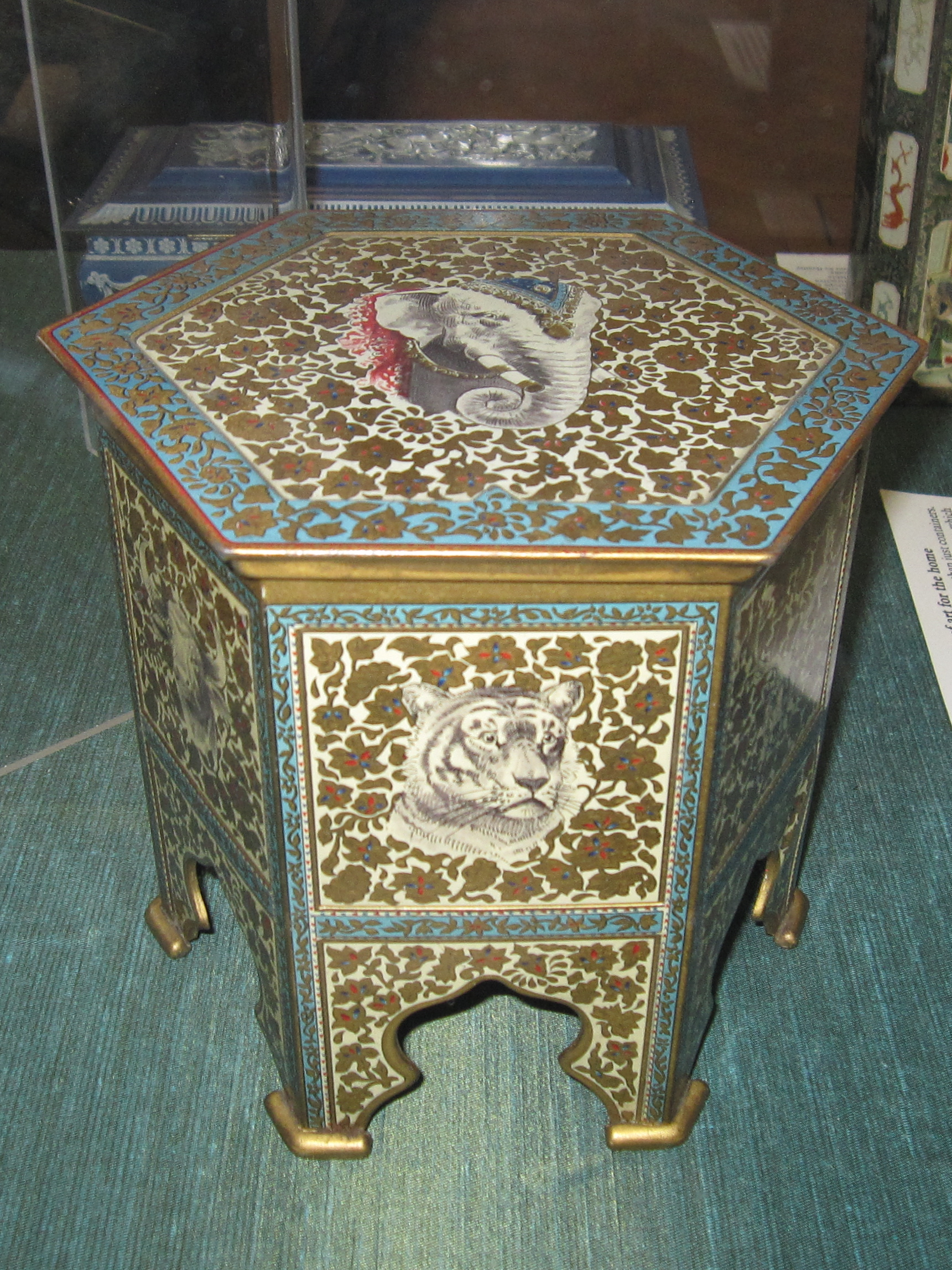

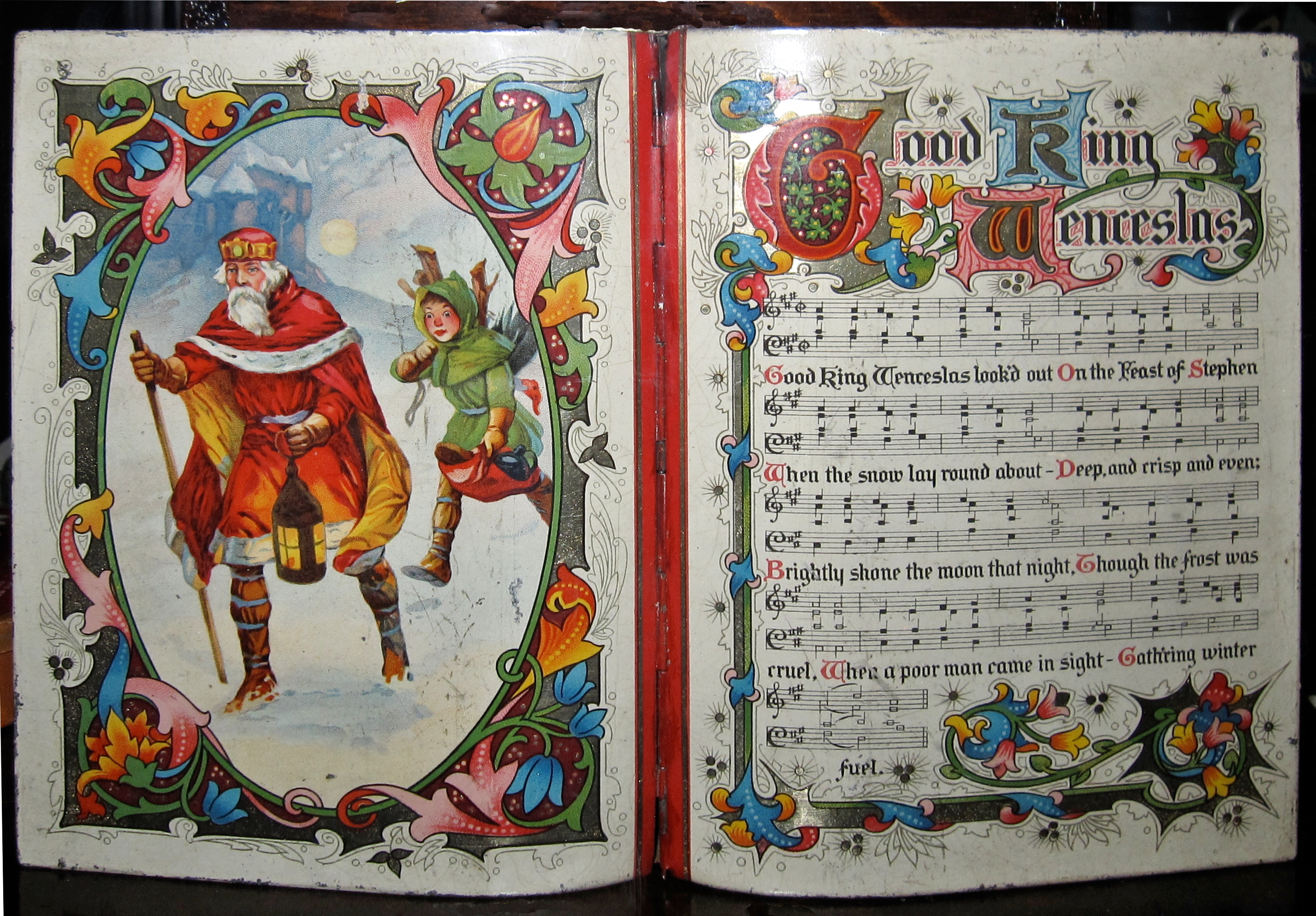

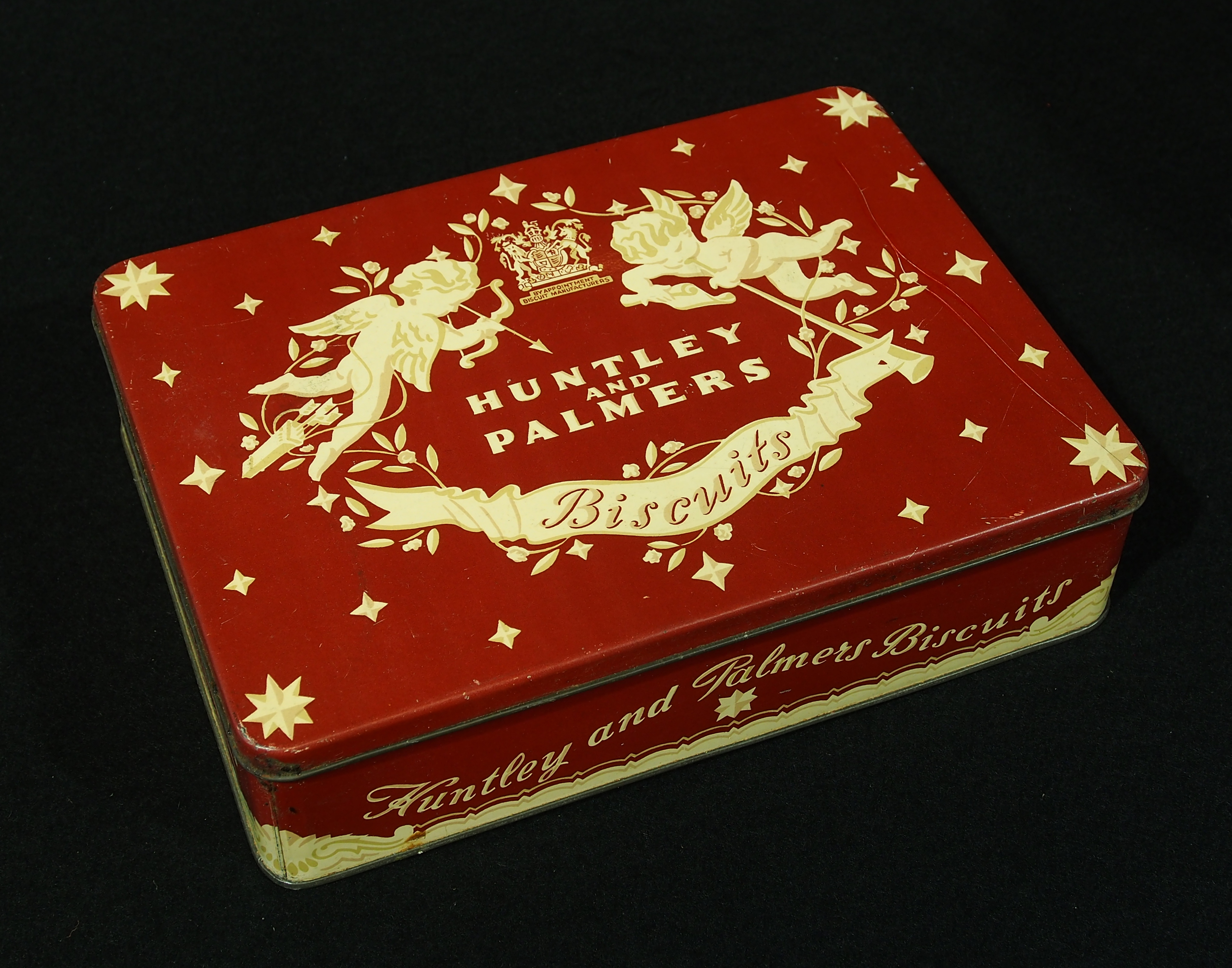

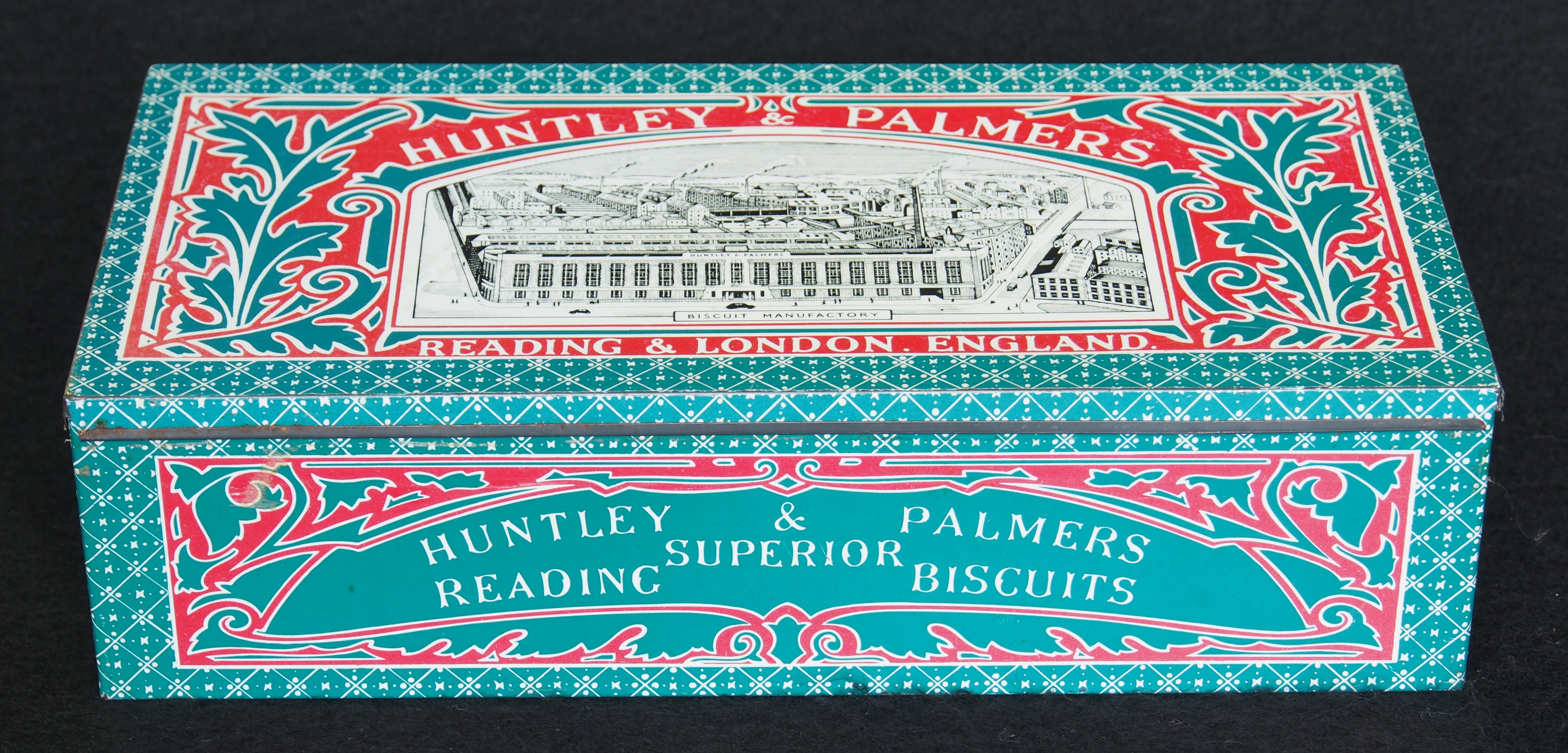

== See also ==
- Burton's Foods
- Fox's Biscuits
- Jacob Fruitfield Food Group
- McVitie's
- Tunnock's
- United Biscuits
- Griffin's Foods
