= Henry Cadogan, 4th Earl Cadogan =

British diplomat and politician (1812–1873)

The Right Honourable The Earl Cadogan PC
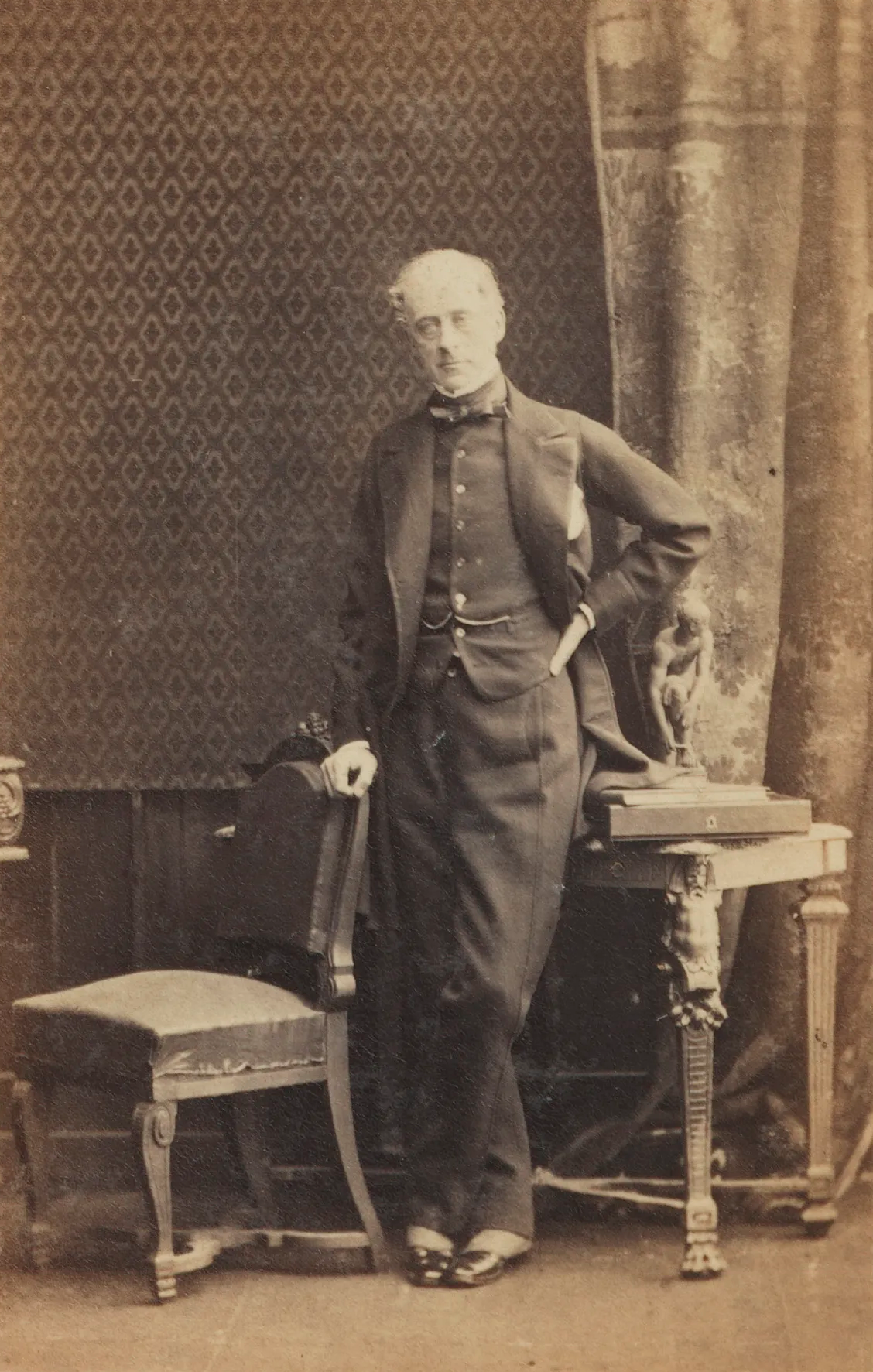
- Portrait by Camille Silvy, 1861

Captain of the Yeomen of the Guard
- In office 10 July 1866 – 1 December 1868
- Monarch: Victoria
- Prime Minister: The Earl of Derby; Benjamin Disraeli
- Preceded by: The Earl of Ducie
- Succeeded by: The Duke of St Albans

Member of Parliament
- In office 1852–1857
- Preceded by: Edward Royd Rice; George Clerk
- Succeeded by: Ralph Bernal Osborne; William Russell
- Constituency: Dover
- In office 1841–1847
- Preceded by: Charles Fyshe Palmer; Thomas Talfourd
- Succeeded by: Francis Pigott Stainsby Conant; Thomas Talfourd
- Constituency: Reading

Personal details
- Born: 15 February 1812 Mayfair, London, England
- Died: 8 June 1873 (aged 61) Woodrising, Norfolk, England
- Party: Conservative
- Spouse: Mary Wellesley (m. 1836; died 1873)
- Children: 6, including George
- Parent: George Cadogan, 3rd Earl Cadogan (father)
- Education: Oriel College, Oxford

Henry Charles Cadogan, 4th Earl Cadogan PC (15 February 1812 – 8 June 1873), styled Viscount Chelsea between 1820 and 1864, was a British diplomat and Conservative politician. He served as Captain of the Yeomen of the Guard between 1866 and 1868.

== Background and education ==
Cadogan was born at South Audley Street, Mayfair, London, the second but eldest surviving son of George Cadogan, 3rd Earl Cadogan, by his wife Honoria Louisa Blake, daughter of Joseph Blake. He was educated at Eton and Oriel College, Oxford.

== Diplomatic and political career ==
Cadogan initially joined the Diplomatic Service and was an attaché in St Petersburg from 1834 to 1835. In 1841 he was elected Member of Parliament (MP) for Reading, a seat he held until 1847, and later represented Dover from 1852 to 1857.

In 1842 he applied for the role of Steward and Bailiff of the Chiltern Hundreds in order to vacate his seat, but this was refused by the Chancellor of the Exchequer due to concerns that any subsequent by-election was being manipulated. This is the most recent time the government refused to allow an MP to resign in this way.

After leaving Parliament he returned to the Diplomatic Service and served as Secretary of the Paris Embassy from 1858 to 1859. In 1864 he succeeded his father in the earldom and entered the House of Lords. When the Conservatives came to power under Lord Derby in 1866, Cadogan was sworn of the Privy Council and appointed Captain of the Yeomen of the Guard, a post he held until 1868, the last year under the premiership of Benjamin Disraeli.

Apart from his diplomatic and political careers, Lord Cadogan was the Colonel of the Royal Westminster Militia, appointed on 6 December 1841. On 13 March 1865 he became Honorary Colonel of the regiment.

== Family ==
Lord Cadogan married Mary Sarah Wellesley, daughter of Valerian Wellesley, on 13 July 1836 in Durham Cathedral. They had four sons and two daughters. The Countess Cadogan died in February 1873, aged 65. Lord Cadogan died at Woodrising, Norfolk, in June 1873, aged 61. His eldest son George succeeded in the earldom.

Parliament of the United Kingdom
Preceded by Charles Fyshe Palmer; Thomas Noon Talfourd	Member of Parliament for Reading; 1841 – 1847; With: Charles Russell	Succeeded by Francis Piggott; Thomas Noon Talfourd
Preceded by Edward Royd Rice; Sir George Clerk, Bt	Member of Parliament for Dover; 1852 – 1857; With: Edward Royd Rice	Succeeded by Ralph Bernal Osborne; Sir William Russell, Bt
Political offices
Preceded by The Earl of Ducie	Captain of the Yeomen of the Guard; 1866–1868	Succeeded by The Duke of St Albans
Peerage of Great Britain
Preceded by George Cadogan	Earl Cadogan; 1864–1873	Succeeded by George Cadogan
