= Edward York =

Edward York may refer to:

- Edward York (politician) (1730–c. 1790), sea captain and politician in Nova Scotia
- Edward York (landowner) (1802–1861), English landowner of Wighill Park
- Edward York (architect) (1863–1928), American architect
- Edward J. York (1912–1984), American air force colonel and participant of the Doolittle Raid

Edward of York may refer to

- Edward, 2nd Duke of York (c.1373–1415)
- Edward IV of England (1442–1483), also known as Edward of York
- Edward V of England (1470–c. 1483), son of the above
- Edward of Middleham, Prince of Wales (1473–1484), cousin of the above
- Prince Edward, Duke of York and Albany (1739–1767)
- Edward VIII (1894–1972), who was known as Prince Edward of York from 1894 to 1901
