= Thomas Talfourd =

English judge and politician

Sir Thomas Noon Talfourd SL
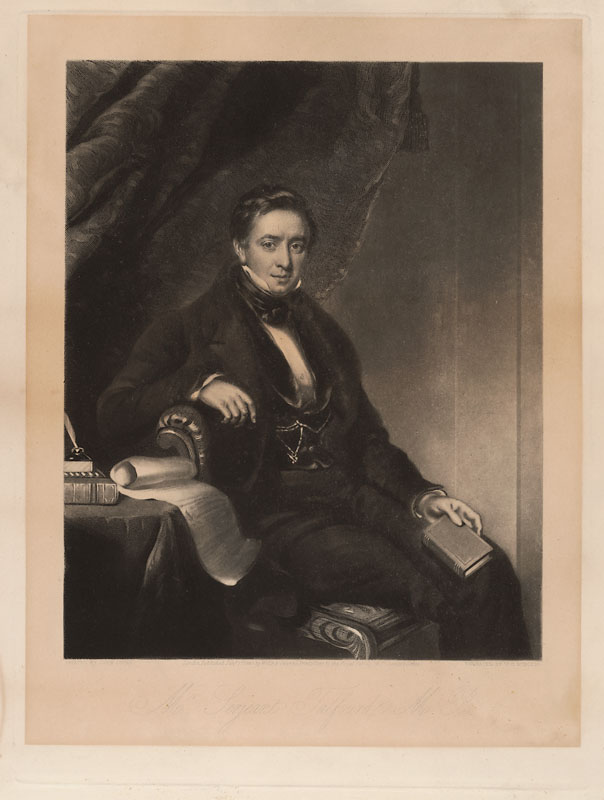

Personal details
- Born: 26 May 1795 Reading, Berkshire, England
- Died: 13 March 1854 (aged 58) Stafford, Staffordshire, England

Sir Thomas Noon Talfourd SL (26 May 1795 – 13 March 1854) was an English judge, Radical politician and author.

== Early life ==
Talfourd was born at Reading, Berkshire, son of Edward Talfourd, a wealthy brewer, and Ann, daughter of Rev. Thomas Noon, a dissenting religious minister in Reading. His father and grandfather were deeply religious; Talfourd himself became a practising Anglican as an adult. He received his education at Hendon and Reading School. At the age of 18, he was sent to London to study law under Joseph Chitty, a special pleader. Early in 1821, he joined the Oxford circuit, having been Called to the Bar at Middle Temple earlier in the year. Fourteen years later, he was created a serjeant-at-law and led the court with William Fry Channell until 1846, when serjeants lost their monopoly of audience. In 1849 he succeeded Thomas Coltman as judge of the Court of Common Pleas.

== In politics ==
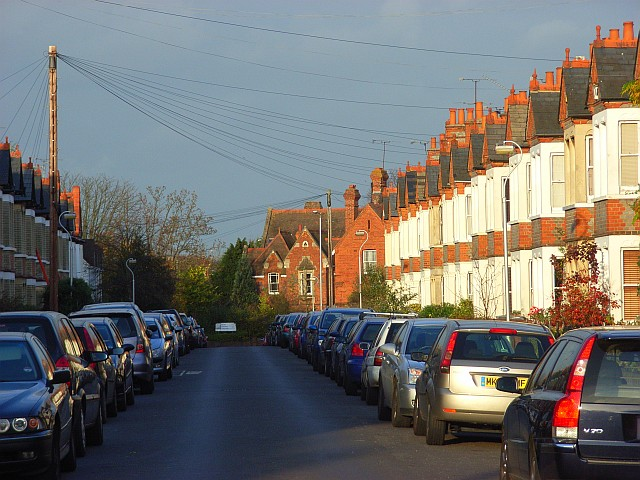
Talfourd Avenue in Reading is named after Thomas Talfourd

At the general election in 1835 he was elected MP for the Parliamentary Borough of Reading as a Radical, a result repeated in the general election of 1837. He chose not to stand in the general election of 1841, but stood again in the general election of 1847 and was elected. In the House of Commons, Talfourd introduced a copyright bill in 1837, but the dissolution of Parliament in 1837 following the death of William IV meant that it had to be reintroduced in the new Parliament in 1838. By that time, the bill was met with strong opposition. Talfourd re-introduced it again in 1839, 1840 and 1841. It finally became law in 1842, albeit in modified form, and at a time when Talfourd was not in Parliament. Charles Dickens dedicated The Pickwick Papers to Talfourd.

== Literary work ==
In his early years in London, Talfourd was dependent in great measure on his literary contributions. He was then on the staff of The London Magazine, and was an occasional contributor to the Edinburgh Review and Quarterly Review, The New Monthly Magazine, and other periodicals; on joining the Oxford circuit, he acted as law reporter to The Times. His legal writings on literary matters are excellent expositions, animated by a lucid and telling, if not highly polished, style. Among the best of these are his article On the Principle of Advocacy in the Practice of the Bar (in the Law Magazine, January 1846); his Proposed New Law of Copyright of the Highest Importance to Authors (1838); Three Speeches delivered in the House of Commons in Favour of an Extension of Copyright (1840); and Speech for the Defendant in the Prosecution, the Queen v. Moxon, for the Publication of Shelley's Poetical Works (1841), a celebrated defence of Edward Moxon.

Talfourd's tragedy Ion was privately printed in 1835 and produced the following year at Covent Garden theatre. It was also well received in America, and was revived at Sadler's Wells Theatre in December 1861. His dramatic poem turns on the voluntary sacrifice of Ion, king of Argos, in response to the Delphic oracle, which had declared that only with the extinction of the reigning family could the prevailing pestilence incurred by the deeds of that family be removed.

Two years later, at the Haymarket Theatre, The Athenian Captive was acted with moderate success. In 1839 Glencoe, was privately printed, and in 1840 it was produced at the Haymarket. The Castilian (1853) did not excite much interest.

Talfourd also wrote:

- "History of Greek Literature", in the Encyclopædia Metropolitana
- The Letters of Charles Lamb, with a Sketch of his Life (1837)
- Recollections of a First Visit to the Alps (1841)
- Vacation Rambles and Thoughts, comprising recollections of three Continental tours in the vacations of 1841, 1842, and 1843 (2 vols., 1844)
- Final Memorials of Charles Lamb (1849–50)

== Family ==
Talfourd married Rachel, daughter of the English political activist and social reformer John Towill Rutt. The barrister and dramatist Francis ("Frank") Talfourd was their eldest son.

== Death ==
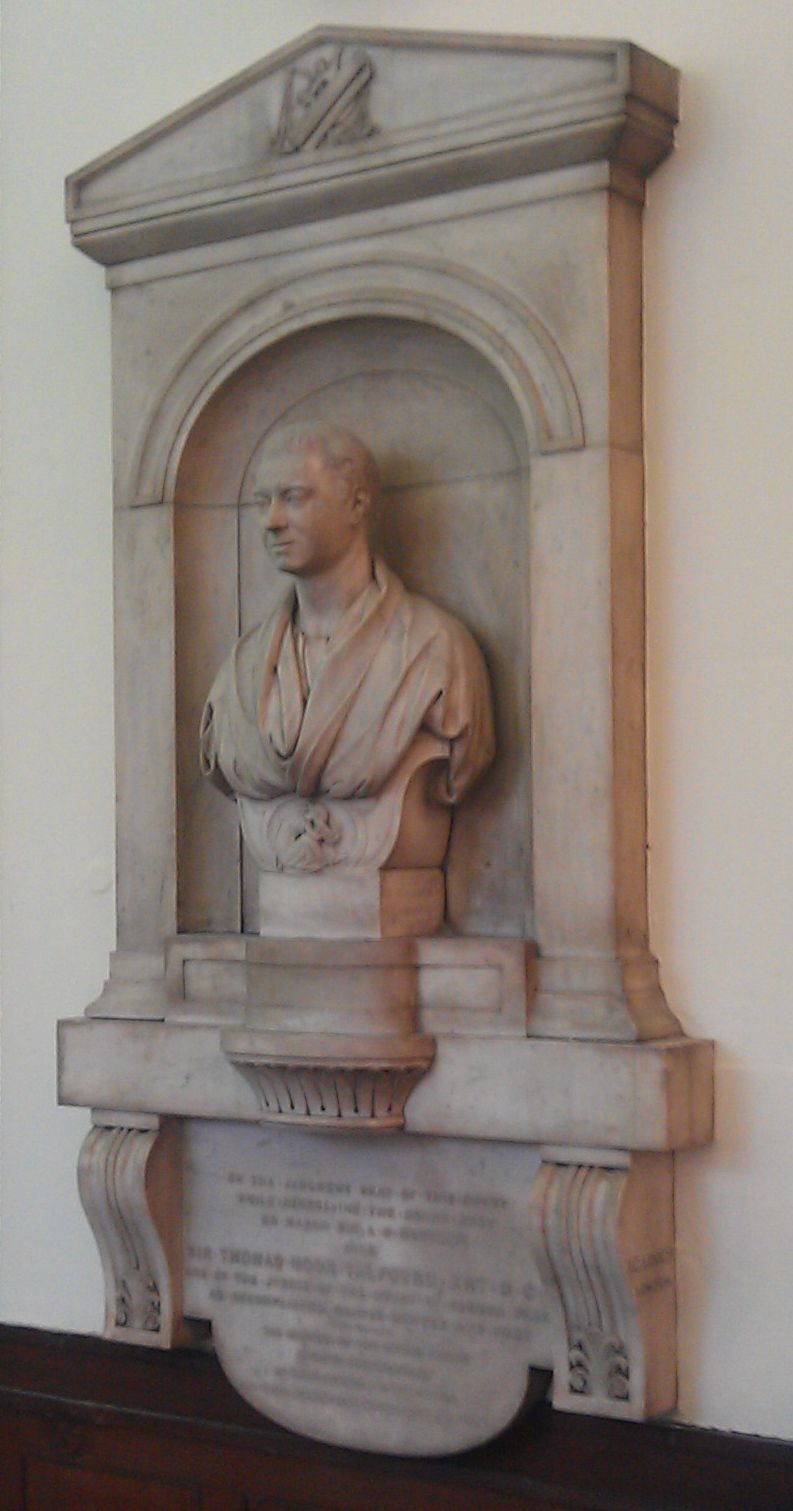
Lough's memorial to Talfourd in the Shire Hall, Stafford

Talfourd died in 1854 in Stafford, after an apoplectic seizure in court while addressing the jury from his judge's seat at the town's Shire Hall, where he is commemorated by a bust, sculpted by John Graham Lough.

Dickens was amongst the mourners at Talfourd's funeral at West Norwood Cemetery. Talfourd Avenue, a residential street in Reading, is named after him.

Parliament of the United Kingdom
Preceded by Charles Fyshe Palmer; Charles Russell	Member of Parliament for Reading; 1835–1841; With: Charles Russell 1835–1837; Charles Fyshe Palmer 1837–1841	Succeeded by Charles Russell; Viscount Chelsea
Preceded by Charles Russell; Viscount Chelsea	Member of Parliament for Reading; 1847–1849; With: Francis Piggott	Succeeded by Francis Piggott; John Frederick Stanford
