= Charles Russell (1786–1856) =

British Conservative and Tory politician

Member of Parliament for Reading
- In office 30 June 1841 – 31 July 1847 Serving with Henry Cadogan
- Preceded by: Thomas Talfourd; Charles Fyshe Palmer
- Succeeded by: Thomas Talfourd; Francis Pigott
- In office 12 August 1830 – 25 July 1837 Serving with Thomas Talfourd (1835–1837); Charles Fyshe Palmer (1830–1835)
- Preceded by: John Monck; Charles Fyshe Palmer
- Succeeded by: Thomas Talfourd; Charles Fyshe Palmer

Personal details
- Born: 22 July 1786 Dover, Kent, England
- Died: 15 May 1856 (aged 69) London, England
- Cause of death: Suicide
- Party: Conservative/Tory
- Parent(s): Sir Henry Russell, 1st Baronet; Anne Barbara Whitworth
- Relatives: Sir Henry Russell, 2nd Baronet (brother)

Charles Russell (22 July 1786 – 15 May 1856) was a British Conservative and Tory politician.

== Family ==
Russell was the second surviving son of Sir Henry Russell, 1st Baronet and his second wife, Anna Barbara Whitworth, sister of Charles Whitworth, 1st Earl Whitworth. He never married and had no issue.

== Military career ==
Described by memoirist William Hickey as a "fine dashing youth", Russell entered as a cadet in the British Indian Army in 1800, becoming an ensign in the 17th Infantry (The Loyal Regiment) in 1801, and a lieutenant in the 21st Bengal Native Infantry 1803. In July 1810, he was appointed to the command of the escort at Hyderabad, and also took temporary responsibility for the residency's business until his brother, Sir Henry Russell, 2nd Baronet arrived from his post at Poona.

Becoming a captain in 1818, Russell then took furlough in 1817, returning to the United Kingdom via Saint Helena, where he witnessed Napoleon—who had then been exiled to the island—walking in front of his house in Longwood. Russell declined to meet Napoleon after being told he must address the former revolutionary leader as 'General'.

Upon return to England, Russell lived mostly in London, and formally retired from the army in 1822, then becoming a proprietor of East India Company stock.

== Corruption scandal ==
Alongside his brother, Henry, Russell was implicated in a corruption scandal where Lord Hastings, a Governor-General of India, was alleged to have acted partially on behalf of Palmer and Company, a Hyderabad banking house. The Russells were found to have to have been involved in and profited from the firm's dealings with the Nizam of Hyderabad, Mir Akbar Ali Khan, directly from Hastings' 1816 decision to exempt the house from a ban on lending money to native princes. Henry Russell's successor, Sir Charles Metcalfe, discovered a loan in 1820 that was both fictitious and fraudulent.

An investigation was launched by the East India Company, which in 1824 ordered the relevant papers to be printed. Henry Russell launched a defence of himself and his brother, Charles, titled Letter to the Court of Directors, arguing the allegations had arisen from "acrimonious party spirit" and complaining that no opportunity had been granted to defend themselves. The matter was debated in court in February 1825, where Henry defended the pair, and they were both absolved in a move designed to avoid a charge of peculation against Hastings.

== Political career ==
=== Colchester and Reading, 1826 ===
Shortly after, Henry Russell was approached to contest the 1826 general election at Colchester but this was blocked by his father if it resulted in a contest. Charles offered to stand for the seat in Henry's place, noting he would resign from the race if it resulted in a contest, if this would ensure the Hyderabad affair was not raised in parliament, but he was "not very solicitous about it" and did not mention this idea to their father.

Brother Henry vetoed the idea, regardless, arguing there was too high a risk of being involved in a difficult contest, especially against the Radical sitting Member of Parliament (MP) Daniel Whittle Harvey, who had previously attacked their father in 1820 and had since become interested in the Hyderabad affair—and was likely to exploit it in order to "defame" Charles. Despite this, Henry recommended Charles to seek election at any other "close seat at a fair price", not seeing the Indian scandal as a barrier to a political career.

Charles Russell, however, believed there was little chance of a contest at Colchester, but decided not to stand, arguing it was in Harvey's "interest as much as ours to keep things quiet", and said:

"Once entangled with Colchester, occasions of local politics and local patronage would be every day occurring to excite angry feelings and we should be involved from one end of the session to another in newspaper skirmishing. I remember thinking when I heard that Harvey was the author of those long dissertations on the Hyderabad question that one motive ... was to arm himself with weapons against us. Hang that rascal Metcalfe. How he is perpetually crossing our path."

At the same general election, but at Reading, Henry Russell and his wife actively supported the canvas of Tory candidate George Spence, who opposed Catholic emancipation, in a bid to remove the sitting Whig MP Charles Fyshe Palmer. The campaign was successful, although Spence was removed just nine months later via an election petition issued by Fyshe Palmer. Henry intervened in a bid to, at some point, also stand for the borough, but Charles warned him to procee cautiously and avoid being "drawn into the town set". At a celebration dinner in July of that year, Henry professed support for Catholic emancipation, and accused Fyshe Palmer and John Monck—a radical Whig MP for the borough—of seeking to obstruct a liberalising government. Charles complimented his brother on the speech, saying:

"I think you are rather above than below your audience, but it is a fault on the right side. The tone of a gentleman is always becoming and the blackguards, if they do not thoroughly understand it, are pleased to be thought to understand it ... I think you have very judiciously shown your opinions on the Catholic question and your coincidence with the liberal part of the administration"

=== 1827–1830 ===
The following year, Charles accompanied his brother on a tour of Flanders, Germany, Switzerland and France. The year after, he went to Dover to investigate the possibility of standing for the borough constituency, but decided against doing so. He was then approached by a stockbroker cousin of Southampton Tory MP Abel Rous Dottin to purchase a £63,000 property in an unnamed borough, which was said to guarantee the occupier command of 214 electors of both seats. A peerage was also on offer for a further £40,000, but Russell reported to his brother that nothing came of the "gross fudge".

In 1829, Russell again received an offer from the same source to allow himself, or Henry, to gain the seat of Leominster upon the retirement of Tory MP Rowland Stephenson. Russell was not convinced by assurances that there would be no contest and so did not pursue the matter.

=== MP for Reading ===
==== 1830–1831 ====
In the following year, Tory MP Spence told Russell that the Tory government's Chief Whip, William Holmes, was seeking to understand whether Henry "wished to be in parliament" and, if so, would support the Wellington–Peel Ministry. The result of these conversations, however, was that Charles was elected Tory MP for Reading at that year's general election, when Monck retired and, in an about-face, recommended the Whig Stephen Lushington to replace him.

At the hustings for the election, Russell addressed accusations that he was an advocate of West Indian slavery and the "promoter of monopoly" by the East India Company, stating he "utterly abhorred" slavery but that abolishing it required a "measure for the protection of British property". He added he had no "tie to bind him" to the company and its interests. After a bitter and prolonged contest, caused by the referral of disputed votes to the assessor, Russell secured the seat and claimed it had been "rescued... from the intolerable burden which oppressed it", claiming he would "go to Parliament a free and independent member".

To his brother, he expressed:

"my most grateful thanks for all your kindness during the election. Nothing but your assistance could have carried me through it ... I wish to God you had been fighting for yourself instead of for me. Your success would have been more easy and more certain and you would have made a much better use of it both for the public and your own family. I will not despair, however, of seeing us still side by side in the House."

At a celebration dinner in September of that year, he observed there were many differences still remaining between the Tories and Whigs, and added that the Whigs:

"would rashly sweep away what they consider, and what we, perhaps, may consider, the evil, regardless of the good which must be carried with it. We would separate the evil from the good, and would even consent to endure the smaller portion of the evil, rather than expose to risk the infinitely larger portion of the good. The leading principle on which they proceed ... is practically a destructive principle. The leading principle on which we proceed ... is practically a conservative principle."

He sought to convinced moderate Whigs that "we are no more enamoured than they are of a despotic power, but that we would only so temper our love of civil liberty, as to prevent freedom from degenerating into licence, anarchy and revolution". The Wellington ministry saw Russell was one of their "friends" and, in October 1830, he met with the Patronage Secretary, Joseph Planta, who reported to Henry Russell that he was "courteous and complimentary".

Russell did not attend a constituency meeting the next day, at which a petition calling for repeal of the house and window taxes was presented. Upon hearing of this, Russell observed to his brother that "my troubles begin to thicken on me" and that the petition was "hard under a declining revenue to force on a minister specific repeals of taxation". Despite this, he agreed to present the petition, and any others, but refused to pledge himself to it "until I see what measures are proposed by the government". Russell also avoided an anti-slavery petition organised by local quakers, pleading he had a prior engagement in London, and adding:

"I am aware that my answers in both these cases will be held to be evasive, but they are no more so than prudence requires and than all my declarations have invariably been. They must be so if I would go unfettered to these questions. If I acquiesce more fully or attend the meetings I shall gradually be drawn into the predicament of connecting myself with the radical and Dissenting party."

Russell avoided another meeting, on the same day, on the subject of reform, at which Palmer was present.

Russell did not take his seat in the House of Commons until October 1830, and immediately shared in the belief that the government had acted "foolishly" on cancelling the royal visit to the City of London on 9 November of that year. Yet, he struggled on the problem of distress" noting it was "severe" among "parts of the agricultural population" but was "by no means general". He concluded that he should say little on the matter, particularly with petitions from constituents pending, and noted the government had few speakers supporting its position on the matter.

In November, he voted silently with the ministers on the civil list, but the vote failed and the government was brought down, leading to a Whig government formed by Lord Grey. In the same month, as he had feared, a petition was lodged against his election, alleging bribery and corruption, but this was not persevered as its promoters believed parliament would be dissolved and an election would be called. Russell admitted this was a "great relief", but he remained anxious that accounts should be settled and care should be taken when "making illegal payments".

While this concern was over, he faced further wrath from his constituents who, as the Berkshire Chronicle reported, were "disappointed" at his vote on the civil. Russell was prepared to defend himself, arguing the vote had not been "a question of economy" but one of "whether the Duke of Wellington or Lord Grey should be premier", adding "I should have been a coward and traitor if I had not voted as I did", if the liberal Reading Mercury attacked the vote. No action was taken immediately, but Russell came under "very unreasonable" fire from his leading friends, who were "greviously offended". In an explanation to his brother, Russell said:

"It seems to me that after professing in every speech I made at Reading opinions favourable to the late ministry, I should have been guilty of the grossest inconsistency, if, on the first important division, before they had time to develop any of their plans, I had lent my hand to cut their throats. Even the opposition ... raised but little clamour about the amount of the civil list ... I know as a positive fact that the effect of the division ... was not generally foreseen, and that, if it had been, many who voted in the majority would have supported ministers."

In any event, Russell was prepared to go to Reading in person to pacify his critics, if his brother approved, and when he was denounced by the Reading Mercury at the end of the month, he wrote a written reply for the Berkshire Chronicle—and considered whether to couple this with an attack on the new government. Nevertheless, he decided that there was a "desire to give a fair trial" to the new government, noting "the opinion of the necessity of economy and reform seems universal and prevails with both parties". He told his brother "we must manage any attack on the present ministry cautiously".

He continued to contemplate a speech on the assessed taxes and whether to present a scheme for their modification, and regarded the Chronicle article as "capital", but disregarded an idea by his chief agent, Alfred Compigne, that he should justify his vote in a public letter to constituents. He said:

"It is the adoption of a principle, from which I entirely dissent, that I owe a responsibility to my constituents for each individual vote; it may prove a very inconvenient and embarrassing precedent; and it commits me still further than I am committed to the present opposition and against the present government."

In December 1830, Russell both presented an anti-slavery petition from the women of Reading and asked if there was any prospect of a Reading reform meeting, noting he "has always been favourable to granting representatives to the large unrepresented towns", believing this would "prove the means of checking the torrent of reform".

By the start of 1831, Russell was still busy trying to finalise his election accounts and, alarmed by reports of plans to dissolve parliament, he planned to return to Reading. His brother advised him and Monck to make a plea to the Home Secretary Lord Melbourne to provide clemency to the so-called 'Swing' rioters who had been sentenced to death at a recent special commission.

Russell attended, with Palmer, a local reform meeting despite believing its signatories were "few and scurvy" and that the meeting was no longer a party matter, believing the Whig government should decide the details on "a firm conviction of its expediency". He said he was prepared to support a "temperate" measure of the type advocated by the government, but disputed that the ballot would "lead to the results which the supports of it expected". His brother did not think "any substantial use" could be made of the argument that the ballot would destroy beneficial "social influences" and admit the "evil" influences advocated by Radicals William Cobbett and Richard Carlile. Despite this, Charles planned to speak on the motion proposed by Henry Warburton, and Henry wrote a speech on this.

At a town meeting in January 1831, Russell reiterated his willingness to support "practical and substantial reform" as long as it was "temperate and consonant with the principles and practice of the English constitution", but flatly refused to countenance the ballot, and again had to defend his vote on the civil list. He said he supported the previous government "because he believed them friends to economy and peace" but would support the current government if they showed similar support for the same principles. Radicals agreed he had performed well and with unsuspected ability. Russell later told his brother that the proposed reform scheme was "gigantic in its dimensions, and it is impossible to contemplate such vast changes without anxiety and alarm. As regards the main point after all, however, the degree in which it will increase the democratic element of our constitution, it has some redeeming virtues."

He particularly agreed with the increase in members for county constituencies and to exclude borough voters from counties which, he said, would "introduce into the house a phalanx of country gentleman connected with the most solid property in the company". He also supported plans for a £10 householder borough franchise, removing non-resident voters, and shortening the duration of the polls. His brother said he "must support the measure", adding it was "popular among the most Tory of our friends" and doing so would "not displease any of your party, and you will conciliate several of the adverse party".

Nevertheless, Russell continued to be "alarmed at the magnitude of the changes" but believed the country would "never be satisfied till they are carried" and would therefore support the bill "on public... as well as on personal considerations". His agent urged him to speak on the matter, but worried about "making any debut on such a question" believing the "fall from such a height will be tremendous" so Russell should first make speeches on "less ambitious views". Henry was asked to draft a speech, and did so "strongly and unreservedly in its favour", believing it would only benefit Russell's position amongst the electorate. He then advised Russell to give a silent vote at the bill's second reading, and then speak at committee stage praising the bill's "principle of raising the respectability of the electors". Indeed, he further advocated raising the borough franchise to £12, or making it £10 based on rates rather than rent. Henry believed this would get rid of opposition from the electorate that were prone to bribery or to support the Radicals. Yet, he warned he "must not openly propose or advocate the change, for fear of giving offence to the parties who would be affected by it".

Charles was attracted by this idea, but composed a speech a set speech on the principle of the measure in case it was required. Compigne was, however, adamant that it would be electorally advantageous, causing Charles to complain to this brother:

"I have got amongst a set of cormorants, and, though I have not said it to a human being, I think I shall probably consult both my happiness and my interest by giving up Parliament. To be sure I have fallen on troubled times, but as yet I have experienced nothing but annoyance."

Upon request, Henry provided a speech for a town meeting on the matter to Charles in the hope it would "please your hearers, those of our own, as well as of the adverse party, despite Charles complaining the meetings were "prodigious bores". Charles told his brother:

"The ground on which I rest my vote is that the present bill, with great and alarming tendencies, yet has many securities; and that with the impulse which the measure has received from the authority of government, it is better to take it as it is and not wait till we shall get it on worse terms. This is my conscientious view, which is always a valid reason for presenting it. With respect to Reading, the honest truth is I am not over-solicitous about it. A seat in Parliament is not worth holding in such trammels, and under such odious and disgusting sacrifices as are constantly demanded from me."

Despite this animosity, at the meeting, he declared his unequivocal support the bill, which he said was based on the "combined principles of population and property; population, to infuse into the system the spirit of real and popular representation; property, to impart to it a character of stability and order". He did not in the end make a set speech at the bill's second reading but, when Palmer presented a petition to the house, he "forced on the house, which was very reluctant to listen to me", a "few words" supporting both the petition and the bill. He then voted for the bill at its second reading, and his intervention escaped the notice of journalists.

Yet, Russell felt parliament would have to be dissolved, regardless of whether the bill passed, noting he was unable to reconcile "how Lord Grey is to carry on the business of the country with the present house" while "Peel would probably shrink from forming a new administration on the unpopular basis of a reform short of that now proposed".

==== 1831–1832 ====
He was correct, and at the general election that year, he pledged his intention to give "honest support" to the bill, and was returned unopposed alongside Palmer. At the hustings, he reiterated his support for the bill on the grounds that "legitimate power given to property" and "that influence conferred on those classes where influence ought to reside". He reserved a right on any alterations, but denied that would do so in "any covert spirit of hostility".

Shortly after his election, Russell fell ill and was unable to attend the opening weeks of the new parliament, obtaining a fortnight's sick leave, before attending for the first time on 26 July 1831. His first vote was then in the committee stage of the reintroduced reform bill, when he divided for the partial disfranchisement of Sudbury, despite believing his opponents "had much reason on their side". He continued to vote steadily in favour of the bill for the remainder of that month and, fearing backlash if he missed a debate on the borough qualification proposals, missed his father's 80th birthday celebrations on 19 August. He then spoke, under "urgent" pressure from Compigne, on the qualification clause on 24 August.

After this, he was not known to have spoken again in parliament, and voted with ministers for the prosecution of those found guilty of giving bribes at the Dublin City election on 23 August. Again, he feared early dissolution of parliament if the House of Lords rejected the bill, and he asked his brother to put in order their election accounts so that they could avoid "the wasteful and exorbitant expenditure" foisted on them in 1830. He missed the unexpected vote on the bill's third division on 19 September, as he was at a dinner, but voted in favour of its passage two days later.

Anticipating a motion by Lord Ebrington on confidence in the ministry, he told his brother:

"If the reform question be made the ground... or if it even occupy a prominent place amongst other grounds, I must vote for it in redemption of my pledges, for any course which could be interpreted into a shrinking from my promises would do me harm with both parties. If the reform question should not mentioned, and a resolution of confidence be proposed on general grounds, even then I think the utmost I could do would be to abstain... and to take an opportunity of explaining at Reading that I did so because, though I could not give a vote which would embrace an approbation of the financial and foreign policy of the present ministry, yet that I could not give one which might be interpreted into a condemnation of their measures on the subject of parliamentary reform."

Henry endorsed the message and Russell then divided for the motion, although he was unable to see "what advantage" ministers derived from it.

Russell then missed a meeting in Reading called by Monck and local radicals to address William IV on the issue of reform, as he received the invitation too late. He also feared that, if a county meeting was called, his presence would be "extremely awkward" as he "could not avoid taking a decisive tone in supporting reform or I should be considered as a trimmer by the reformers; and if I did take a decisive tone I should offend many of the old Blue party". However, no meeting took place.

He was again struck ill in the autumn from a "deranged stomach, a dry hacking cough" and reported that "the secretions of my bowels are slimy and unhealthy" and used this as an excuse to avoid attending a dinner in Reading to pay tribute to Monck on 22 November.

Still ill, he attended the State Opening of Parliament, and began to doubt the revisions put forward by the Grey ministry to the reform bill, wondering "by what means Lord Grey proposes to carry it through the Lords". He soon learned of a plan to appoint 45 new peers, and divided for the bill's second reading on 17 December 1831, as well as to deprive 30 boroughs of one member on 23 January 1832. He voted with the government on reforms to Appleby, Helston and Tower Hamlets, and for the bill's third reading on 22 March. On 14 May, he once again stayed away from a Reading meeting on the subject, with his brother noting:

"The whole tone and character of the meeting, and the resolutions that will be moved, and probably adopted, are expected to be of the most violent description. Your entering into them cordially is out of the question; your entering into them partially will offend your friends, without satisfying your enemies; and your opposing them, perhaps the wisest as well as the manliest course, if you were compelled to attend, would exasperate a very powerful body of hostile and even neutral constituents, without pleasing the Tories a bit more than you would please them by staying away altogether."

On 22 February, he was appointed to the select committee on the East India Company's affairs, a day after his brother had given evidence to its political and foreign sub-committee—which also happened on 30 March, and in the military sub-committee on 19 April.

Ahead of the dissolution of parliament, Russell wrote to the chairman saying these was no reason to worry about his absence, noting his votes provided the "best proofs of his sincerity in the cause of reform". He voted in favour of the second reading of the Irish reform bill on 25 May and against any increase in Scottish county representation on 1 June.

==== 1832–1847 ====
Russell was subsequently returned again for Reading at the 1832 general election, when he pledged for cautious reform of the church and the Corn Laws but evaded questions on slavery, triennial parliaments and municipal reform. He began to gravitate towards Peelite Conservatives and it was in that regard he was re-elected in 1835 and lost an election in 1837. He regained the seat in 1841 before losing it again in 1847 and retiring from politics.

== Later life and death ==
Then living in Adelaide Place near London Bridge, in 1839, he became a member of the Institution of Civil Engineers. Between 1839 and 1855, he was a "forceful and successful" chairman of the Great Western Railway, retiring due to ill health.

In 1856, he committed suicide at his home in Argyle Street, London, becoming the second of four Reading MPs to take his own life. An inquest after his death found, in the early hours of 15 May, he had shot himself in the mouth on a second attempt after the pistol had first misfired. His valet said, in his final few days, he had been suffering from chest pains which had depressed him, and had found him alive but insensible at 06:45, lingering until 14:00 with a bullet in his brain. A verdict of suicide under the influence of "temporary insanity" was returned.

In accordance with his will, the residue of his estate was left to his nephew, Sir Charles Russell, 3rd Baronet, and created a trust fund for the payment of annuities of £200 each to spinster Mary Ann Watkins and her daughter, who may also have been his, Jane Watkins. He also left money for care of Janes Monies née Ellis, who he had been trustee for and was confined in a Hoxton lunaitc asylum. This paid for the rents and profits on a leasehold in St Pancras, London, which provided her with £100 a year for life.

Parliament of the United Kingdom
Preceded by John Monck; Charles Fyshe Palmer	Member of Parliament for Reading; 1830–1837; With: Thomas Talfourd (1835–1837); Charles Fyshe Palmer (1830–1835)	Succeeded by Thomas Talfourd; Charles Fyshe Palmer
Preceded by Thomas Talfourd; Charles Fyshe Palmer	Member of Parliament for Reading; 1841–1847; With: Henry Cadogan	Succeeded by Thomas Talfourd; Francis Pigott
