= HMS Algiers (1854) =

Ship of the line of the Royal Navy

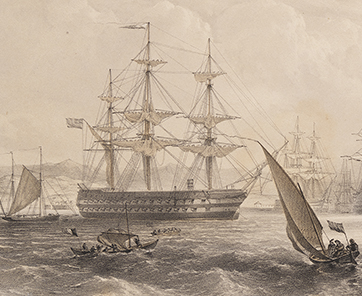
- Algiers off Sebastopol

History

United Kingdom
- Name: Algiers
- Ordered: 3 October 1833 (as 110-gun first rate); 26 December 1840 (as 90-gun second rate); 25 April 1847 (altered design); 3 August 1852 (conversion to steam)
- Builder: Pembroke Dockyard (as first ordered); Plymouth Dockyard (from 1840)
- Laid down: 10 July 1843
- Launched: 26 January 1854
- Completed: By 30 June 1854
- Decommissioned: 12 December 1862
- Fate: Sold for scrap, 26 February 1870

General characteristics (as built)
- Type: 91-gun second rate ship of the line
- Displacement: 4,730 long tons (4,810 t)
- Tons burthen: 3,347 bm
- Length: 218 ft 7 in (66.6 m) (gun deck)
- Beam: 60 ft (18.3 m)
- Draught: 25 ft 7 in (7.8 m)
- Depth of hold: 24 ft 5 in (7.4 m)
- Installed power: 1,117 ihp (833 kW)
- Propulsion: 1 screw; 1 single-expansion steam engine
- Sail plan: Full-rigged ship
- Speed: 9 knots (17 km/h; 10 mph)
- Complement: 850
- Armament: 91 muzzle-loading, smoothbore guns: Lower deck: 32 × 8 in (203 mm) shell guns; Upper deck: 32 × 32 pdrs; Quarter deck & Forecastle: 26 × 32 pdrs; 1 × 68 pdr gun

HMS Algiers was a 91-gun, second rate steam and sail-powered ship of the line built for the Royal Navy (RN) during the 1850s. The ship was converted to screw power while under construction. Completed in 1854, she initially served as a troopship during the Crimean War of 1854–1856 against the Russian Empire. Algiers was transferred to the Black Sea later that year and played a minor role in the Siege of Sevastopol. She participated in the Battle of Kinburn in 1855 before returning home to be paid off in 1856. Her engine was replaced during a lengthy refit before she was recommissioned in 1859 for service with the Channel Fleet. Algiers was transferred to the Mediterranean Fleet in 1861 and returned home the following year to be paid off for the final time. The ship was sold for scrap in 1870.

== Background and description ==
Algiers had an exceedingly complicated design history. The ship was first ordered from HM Dockyard, Pembroke, in 1833 as a 110-gun, first rate Queen-class ship of the line designed by Sir William Symonds, Surveyor of the Navy. On 10 December 1834, the order for Algiers was changed to a 74-gun, third rate with her original dimensions, but this was changed once more to a 110-gun ship on 5 February 1839. The order was amended once more, to build her at HM Dockyard, Devonport, as a 90-gun Albion-class ship of the line on 26 December 1840, effectively cancelling the original order. Algiers was finally laid down to this design on 10 July 1843.

Construction was suspended on 5 March 1844 and Algiers was reordered on 25 April 1847 to a modified Queen design by the Chatham Committee of three graduates from the School of Naval Architecture which was lengthened by 6 feet (1.8 m). She was intended to measure 210 feet (64 m) at the gun deck and 170 feet (51.8 m) at the keel. She would have had a beam of 60 feet (18.3 m), a depth of hold of 24 feet 5 inches (7.4 m) and had a tonnage of 3,165 42/94 tons burthen. Her crew would have numbered 750 officers and ratings. The ship had the usual three-masted full-ship rig. Algiers's muzzle-loading, smoothbore armament was intended to consist of thirty-two 8-inch (203 mm) (65 cwt) shell guns (Note: "Cwt" is the abbreviation for hundredweight, 65 cwt referring to the weight of the gun.) on the lower gun deck. The upper gun deck was planned to have had thirty-two 56 cwt, 32-pounder guns. Between her forecastle and quarterdeck, the ship would have carried twenty-four 42 cwt, 32-pounder guns and a pair of 8-inch, 52 cwt, shell guns.

=== Screw conversion ===
Completion of the French fast steam-powered, second-rate Napoléon in early 1852 and the French preparations for building more like her caused an invasion scare that prompted the First Derby ministry to authorize a large programme of steam-powered ships of the line to maintain British naval superiority; thus initiating a naval arms race between France and Britain. Captain Baldwin Wake Walker, the Surveyor of the Navy, ordered Algiers to be converted in 1852 in response while she was still under construction. She had to be lengthened by 8 feet (2.4 m) to incorporate a steam engine and a propeller. The ship measured 218 feet 7 inches (66.6 m) on the gun deck and 179 feet 9 inches (54.8 m) on the keel. Her beam and depth of hold were unchanged. She had a deep draught of 25 feet 7 inches (7.8 m). Algiers displaced 4,730 long tons (4,810 t) and had a tonnage of 3,347 tons burthen. The ship was fitted with a four-cylinder, geared, single-expansion steam engine built by William Fairbain and Sons that had been taken from the frigate Megaera. The engine was rated at 450 nominal horsepower and drove a single propeller shaft. Her boilers provided enough steam to give the engine 1,117 indicated horsepower (833 kW) that was good for a speed of 9 knots (17 km/h; 10 mph). To reduce drag and improve performance under sail, the ship could hoist her propeller into the hull and retract the telescoping funnel. Her crew numbered 850 officers and ratings.

The ship's armament consisted of thirty-two 8-inch shell guns on her lower gundeck and thirty-two 32-pounder (56 cwt) guns on her upper gundeck. Between her forecastle and quarterdeck, Algiers carried twenty-six 32-pounder (42 cwt) guns and a single 95 cwt, 68-pounder gun on a pivot mount.

== Construction and career ==
Named to commemorate of the Bombardment of Algiers in 1816, Algiers was the first ship of her name to serve in the RN. She was initially ordered on 3 October 1833 and laid down in May 1843. Her design was changed several times before she was re-ordered on 25 April 1847 as a 90-gun second rate. The Admiralty ordered that she be lengthened and fitted with screw propulsion while under construction on 3 August 1852. The conversion began on 27 September and Algiers was launched on 26 January 1854. The ship was commissioned on 27 May by Captain Charles Talbot and completed on 30 June. During the Crimean War, Algiers helped to ferry 10,000 French troops to the Åland Islands the following month, off-loading the guns from her lower gun deck to accommodate some of the French troops. and then transporting 420 Russian prisoners back to Britain that had been captured during the Battle of Bomarsund in August.

The ship arrived in the Black Sea on 23 October and suffered rudder damage during the storm of 14 November. She helped to blockade Sevastopol through the winter of 1854–1855. On 22 May, Algiers was part of the fleet that landed Allied troops near the city of Kerch. The Russian troops in the vicinity withdrew, demolishing the local defences and burning most of their supplies, allowing the Allies to occupy and loot Kerch and Yeni-Kale. The ship then participated in the bombardment of Kinburn Fortress on 17 October. Algiers departed the Black Sea in November. Commodore Henry Codrington assumed command of the ship on 13 February 1856 and was appointed to command a division of gunboats for the forthcoming campaign in the Baltic. The Treaty of Paris that ended the war was signed the following month forestalled the British plans. She ferried troops home from the Crimea before she was paid off on 13 September.

Her unreliable and inefficient engine was replaced by a 600-nhp engine built by Maudslay, Sons and Field in a lengthy refit that lasted from January 1857 to March 1859. During her sea trials in Stokes Bay on 18 February 1858, the ship reached 12.2 knots (22.6 km/h; 14.0 mph) from 2,516 ihp (1,876 kW), albeit without her masts.Algiers was recommissioned on 7 February 1859 by Captain George O'Callaghan on 7 February and assigned to the Channel Fleet. She was transferred to the Mediterranean Fleet in March 1861 and O'Callaghan was relieved by Captain Edward Rice later that year. The ship returned home and was paid off on 12 December 1862. Algiers was sold for scrap on 26 February 1870.

== Bibliography ==
- Clowes, William Laird (1901). The Royal Navy: A History from the Earliest Times to the Present. Vol. VI. Sampson Low, Marston.
- Colledge, J. J.; Warlow, Ben & Bush, Steve (2020). Ships of the Royal Navy: The Complete Record of all Fighting Ships of the Royal Navy from the 15th Century to the Present (5th revised and updated ed.). Seaforth Publishing. ISBN 978-1-5267-9327-0.
- Duckers, Peter (2011). The Crimean War at Sea: Naval Campaigns against Russia, 1854-56. Pen & Sword Maritime. ISBN 978-1-84884-267-0.
- Lambert, Andrew D. (1984). Battleships in Transition: The Creation of the Steam Battlefleet 1815-1860. Conway Maritime Press. ISBN 0-85177-315-X.
- Lambert, Andrew (2011) [1990]. The Crimean War: British Grand Strategy Against Russia, 1853–56 (Second ed.). Ashgate. ISBN 978-1-4094-1011-9.
- Lambert, Andrew D. (1991). The Last Sailing Battlefleet: Maintaining Naval Mastery 1815 - 1850. Conway Maritime Press. ISBN 0-85177-591-8.
- Manning, T. D. & Walker, C. F. (1959). British Warship Names. Putnam. OCLC 838607.
- Winfield, Rif (2014). British Warships in the Age of Sail 1817–1863: Design, Construction, Careers and Fates. Seaforth Publishing. ISBN 978-1-84832-169-4.
