= Edward York (landowner) =

Edward York JP DL (6 January 1802 – 26 January 1861) was an English landowner.

== Early life ==
He was the son of Richard York and Lady Mary Anne Lascelles. His father served as High Sheriff of Yorkshire from 1832 to 1833.

His maternal grandparents were Edward Lascelles, 1st Earl of Harewood, MP for Northallerton, and the former Anne Chaloner (a daughter of Thomas Chaloner of Guisborough).

== Career ==
He lived at Wighill Park, Wighill, Yorkshire. The family later moved to Hutton Hall in York.

York served as a Justice of the Peace and Deputy Lieutenant of the North Riding of Yorkshire.

== Personal life ==
On 25 November 1837, York married Penelope Beatrix Sykes (1810–1873) in Roos, Yorkshire. She was a daughter of the Rev. Christopher Sykes, the Rector of Roos, and Lucy Dorothea Langford. Together, they were the parents of:

- Lucy Mary York (1838–1893), who married Edward Brooksbank, son of Rev. Edward Hawke Brooksbank and Hannah Heywood, in 1857.
- Caroline Penelope York (1839–1893), who married Rev. John Morland Rice, son of Edward Royd Rice and Elizabeth Knight (a niece of Jane Austen), in 1864.
- Edward Christopher York (1842–1885), who married Isabel Augusta Fairfax, daughter of Thomas Fairfax and Louisa Constantia Ravenscroft, in 1870. After her death, he married Celina Rose Marsden, daughter of Rev. Charles Marsden, in 1876.
- Laura Marianne York (1846–1899), who married Admiral Sir Ernest Rice, also a son of Edward Royd Rice, in 1870. After her death in 1899, he married Fanny Julia Dawkins, daughter of Clinton George Augustus Dawkins, consul-general to Vienna, in 1903.

York died on 26 January 1861.

=== Descendants ===
Through his daughter Lucy, he was a grandfather of Sir Edward Clitherow Brooksbank, 1st Baronet, a Justice of the Peace and a deputy Lieutenant for the West Riding of Yorkshire.
