= Edward Rice (Royal Navy officer) =

Royal Navy Admiral (1819-1902)

Admiral Sir Edward Rice KCB DL
- Born: 30 October 1819; Godmersham, Kent
- Died: 30 October 1902 (aged 83); Dane Court, Dover
- Military career
- Allegiance: United Kingdom
- Branch: Royal Navy
- Service years: 1832–1884
- Rank: Admiral
- Commands: HMS Leander; HMS Royal Albert; HMS Algiers; HMS St George; HMS Asia; Nore Command
- Conflicts: First Opium War; Second Anglo-Burmese War; Crimean War
- Awards: Knight Commander of the Order of the Bath

Admiral Sir Edward Bridges Rice, KCB, DL (30 October 1819 – 30 October 1902) was a Royal Navy officer who went on to be Commander-in-Chief, The Nore.

== Naval career ==
The son of Edward Royd Rice MP and Elizabeth Austen Knight (niece of Jane Austen). He was the brother of Admiral Sir Ernest Rice, Edward Rice joined the Royal Navy in 1832. He became mate in 1839, and was on board HMS Dido which took part in operations on the Yangtze River in 1842 during the First Opium War. After promotion to lieutenant in 1844 and commander in 1850, he then commanded a flotilla of boats on the Irrawaddy River in 1852 during the Second Anglo-Burmese War. Rice had charge of the seamen and naval guns on shore at the capture of Prome, for which he received the official thanks of the Governor-General in Council. In 1854, when commander of HMS Prometheus, he attacked the Riff pirates on shore near Cape Tres Forcas, and recaptured an English brig.

Promoted to captain in 1855, he commanded HMS Leander at Sevastopol during the closing stages of the Crimean War. He also commanded HMS Royal Albert, HMS Algiers, HMS St George and then HMS Asia, and was aide-de-camp to Queen Victoria from 1869 to 1873. Promoted to flag rank as rear-admiral in 1873, he was appointed Second-in-Command of the Mediterranean Fleet in 1875, Admiral Superintendent of Malta Dockyard in 1876, then promoted to vice-admiral in 1878. He was Commander-in-Chief, The Nore from 1882 until he retired in 1884, and was promoted to admiral three days after his retirement. He was appointed a Companion of the Order of the Bath (CB) in 1881, and promoted to Knight Commander (KCB) in the 1887 Golden Jubilee Honours list.

He lived at Dane Court in Dover and in retirement was Deputy Lieutenant of Kent.

He died at Dane Court on 30 October 1902, aged 83.

== Family ==
Rice married in 1864 Cecilia Caroline Harcourt, daughter of Rev. William Vernon Harcourt, of Nuneham Park; they had one son, Henry Edward Harcourt Rice (1864-1944), who married Hon. Helen Sarah Godley, daughter of Arthur Godley, 1st Baron Kilbracken.

His only son had issues including Edward Denis Rice (1899-1973), who married and later dirvoced Grace Lucille Marcella Rice (Duggan), daughter of Grace, Marchioness Curzon of Kedleston, had 3 children with her (one of them was Caroline Helen Rice, wife of Other Windsor-Clive, 3rd Earl of Plymouth).

Military offices
Preceded by Edward Inglefield	Admiral Superintendent, Malta Dockyard; 1876–1878	Succeeded by William Luard
Preceded by Sir Reginald Macdonald	Commander-in-Chief, The Nore; 1882–1884	Succeeded by Sir John Corbett
