= George King (Royal Navy officer) =

Royal Navy Admiral (1809–1891)

Admiral Sir George King KCB
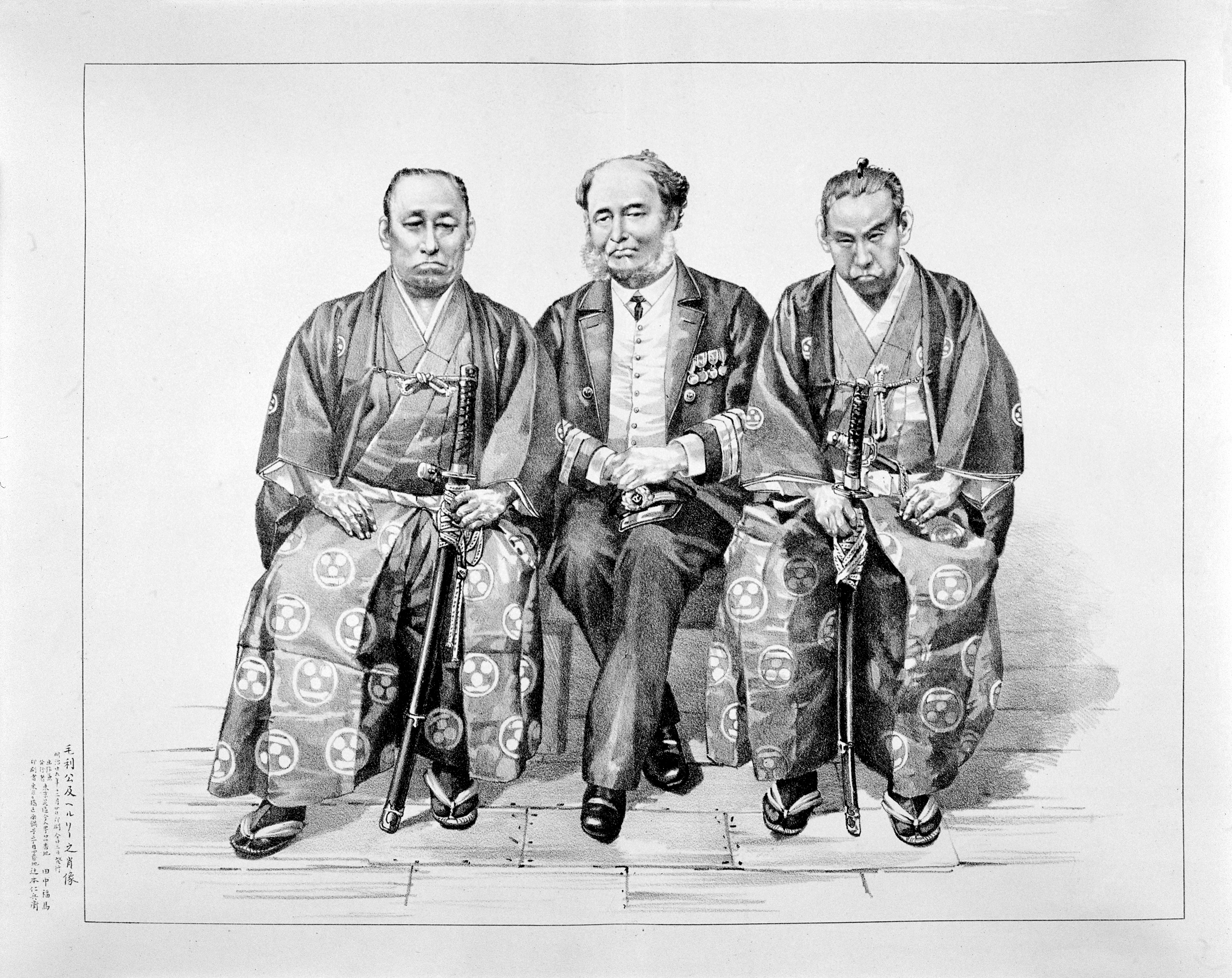
- Vice-Admiral George King with Mōri Takachika and Mōri Motonori of Chōshū Domain in 1867 (Yamaguchi Prefectural Archives)
- Born: 15 July 1809; Stonehouse, Devon, England
- Died: 18 August 1891 (aged 82); Exeter, Devon, England
- Military career
- Allegiance: United Kingdom
- Branch: Royal Navy
- Service years: 1822–1877
- Rank: Admiral
- Commands: HMS Leander; HMS Rodney; HMS St Jean d'Acre; East Indies and China Station; China Station
- Conflicts: Crimean War
- Awards: Knight Commander of the Order of the Bath

Admiral Sir George St Vincent King KCB (15 July 1809 – 18 August 1891) was a Royal Navy officer who served as Commander-in-Chief, China Station.

== Early life ==
King was born on 15 July 1809 at Stonehouse, Devon, the second son of Vice-Admiral Sir Richard King and Sarah Anne née Duckworth. He pursued studies at Royal Naval College, Portsmouth.

== Naval career ==
King joined the Royal Navy in 1822. Promoted to captain in 1841, he commanded HMS Leander in the Black Sea during the Crimean War. He commanded HMS Rodney from 1854 and HMS St Jean d'Acre from 1855. In September 1856, HMS St Jean d'Acre took Earl Granville to the coronation of Czar Alexander II at St Petersburg. Earl Granville was leader of the Liberal party in the House of Lords, and head of the British delegation to Alexander II's coronation.

He was appointed commander-in-chief, East Indies and China Station in 1864 and commander-in-chief, China Station in 1865. He retired in 1877 and succeeded his elder brother as the 4th Baronet in 1887.

== Family life ==
King married Lady Caroline Mary Dawson Damer in 1847. He assumed the arms and prefix surname of the Duckworth family from Admiral Sir John Duckworth, his grandfather, in 1888. King died at his home Wear House in Exeter, Devon, on 18 August 1891 aged 82. He was buried in a new vault at Topsham Cemetery, Exeter on 25 August 1891.

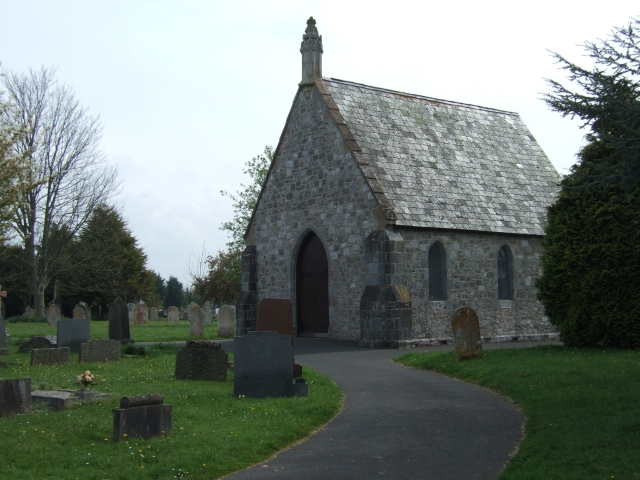
Topsham Cemetery and Chapel

Military offices
Preceded by Sir Augustus Kuper	Commander-in-Chief, East Indies and China Station; 1864–1865	Succeeded by Frederick Montresor as Commander-in-Chief East Indies & Cape of Good Hope Station
New post	Commander-in-Chief, China Station; 1865–1867	Succeeded by Sir Henry Keppel
Baronetage of Great Britain
Preceded by Richard Duckworth King	Baronet (of Bellevue); 1887–1891	Succeeded by Dudley Duckworth-King
