= HMS Leander (1848) =

Sailing frigate of the Royal Navy

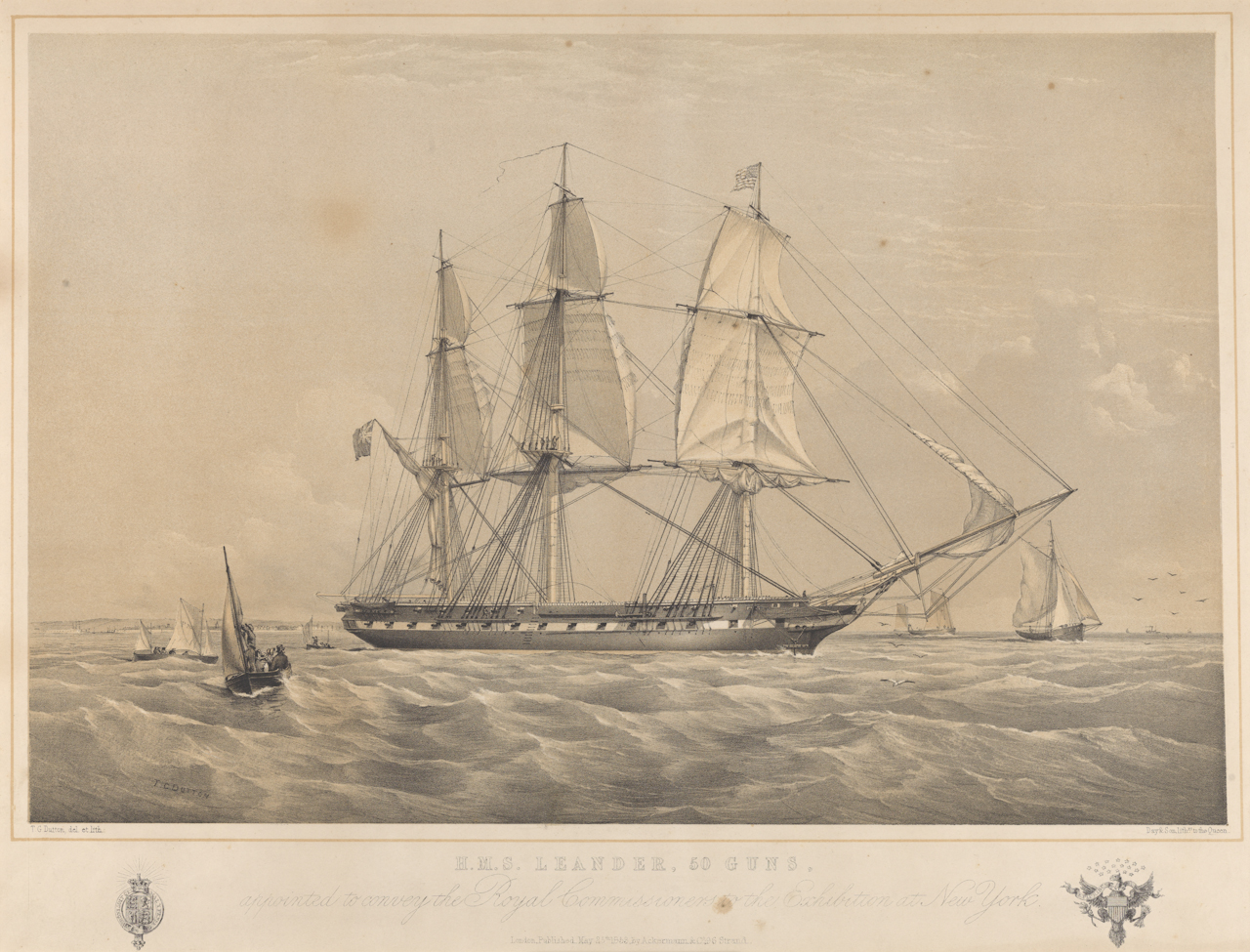
- H.M.S. Leander, 50 guns, appointed to convey the Royal Commissioners to the Exhibition at New York, artist and engraver Thomas Goldsworthy Dutton

History

United Kingdom
- Name: HMS Leander
- Builder: HMNB Portsmouth, Portsmouth, United Kingdom
- Laid down: 4 July 1843
- Launched: Floated out 8 March 1848
- Christened: 8 March 1848
- Commissioned: 28 September 1849
- Decommissioned: 17 November 1866
- In service: 1848?
- Out of service: 1867
- Reclassified: 26 February 1861 as steam frigate
- Refit: 21 January 1860 for conversion to screw propulsion
- Stricken: 17 November 1866
- Honours and awards: Crimean War
- Fate: Sold to Castle & Beech April 1867 for BU at Charlton, Kent

General characteristics
- Class & type: 50-gun fourth rate
- Type: Frigate
- Tons burthen: 1,98710/94 bm as Sailing Frigate; 3,53910/94 bm as Screw Frigate
- Length: 181 feet (55 m) (gundeck) as Sailing Frigate; 241 feet (73 m) (gundeck) as Screw Frigate
- Beam: 16 feet (4.9 m)
- Installed power: 400 ihp.
- Propulsion: sail then sail & Steam
- Sail plan: Full-rigged ship
- Speed: 9.703 knots under steam power
- Crew: 525 as Screw Frigate
- Armament: 50 guns as Sailing Frigate and 51 guns as Screw Frigate

HMS Leander was a 50-gun frigate (rated in the fourth rate) of the Royal Navy which saw service in the Crimean War.

Leander operated from 1849 to 1856 as a sailing frigate. She served as flagship for Rear-Admiral Charles Howe Fremantle in the Black Sea during the Crimean War, from 6 January 1855 to 23 September 1856. She was then refitted and recommissioned on 16 February 1861 as a steam-powered screw frigate. From 23 May 1863 to 16 June 1866 she was the flagship of the Pacific Station Southern Division based out of Valparaíso, Chile before returning to Britain on 17 November 1866 and being broken up in 1867.

== Construction and commissioning ==
HMS Leander was ordered from the HMNB Portsmouth on 4 July 1843. She was three-eighths completed in January 1846 and built of wood to a design by Richard F. S. Blake, the master shipwright for HMNB Portsmouth from 1830 to 1835. Leander was floated out on 8 March 1848.

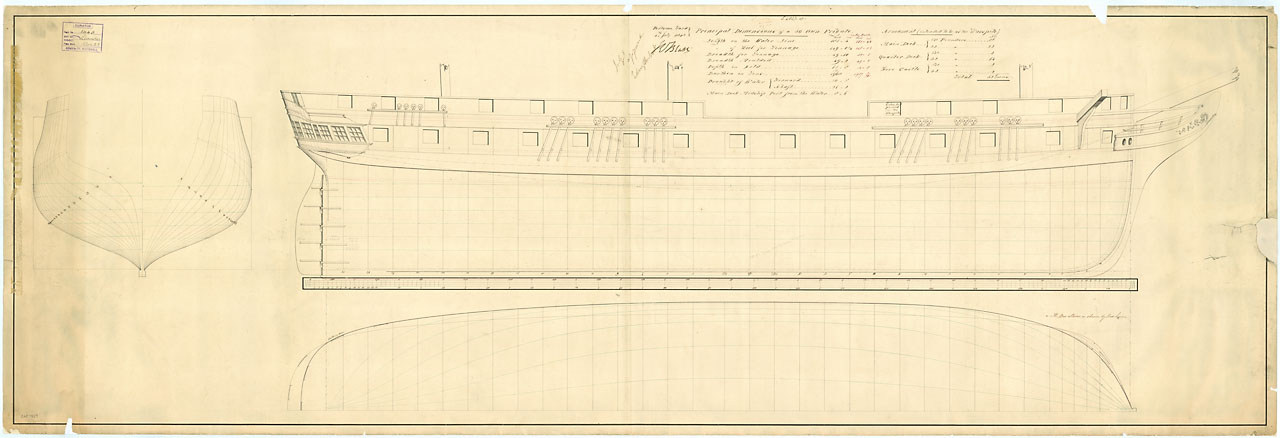
Plan of Leander drawn in 1843

== Early service ==
Leander was commissioned under her first commander, Captain Sidney Dacres, on 28 September 1849. Born into a substantial naval dynasty during the Napoleonic Wars, he eventually rose to the rank of admiral and became First Naval Lord. His only significant action as First Naval Lord was to press for the abolition of masts. He went on to be visitor and governor of Greenwich Hospital. He commissioned her at Portsmouth for particular service in a Squadron of Evolution. He commanded the Leander until 3 June 1852.

== Crimean War service ==
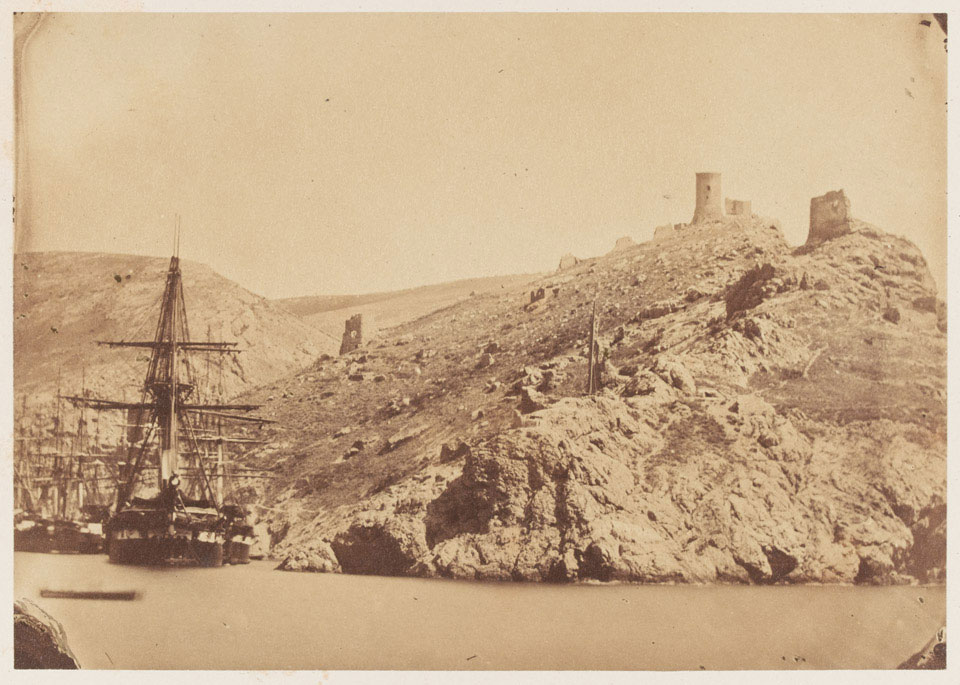
The Leander at the entrance of Balaclava harbour, 1855

Her next captain, George King, commanded her from 3 June 1852 to 22 November 1854. On 25 May 1853 she was engaged to convey the royal commissioners to the Exhibition of the Industry of All Nations in New York City. He then took her out to the Mediterranean and then the Black Sea at the start of the Crimean War. King went on to be Commander-in-Chief, China Station. Her next captain was Swynfen Carnegie from 22 November 1854 to 1855. He went on to be Fourth Naval Lord. On 6 January 1855, under her new Captain William Peel, she became the flagship of Rear-Admiral Charles Howe Fremantle, controlling the naval transport service from Balaclava on the Crimean Peninsula during the Crimean War. Peel served with the Naval Brigade during the Crimean War. On 18 October 1854 at the Siege of Sevastopol, he picked up from amongst several powder cases a live shell with the fuse still burning and threw it over the parapet. The shell burst as it left his hands. For this he was awarded the Victoria Cross (VC); it is now displayed at the National Maritime Museum in Greenwich, England. On 13 August 1855 William Moorsom became her captain, and she remained Fremantle's flagship. Her final Crimean War captain was Edward Rice, from 5 January 1856 until she paid off at Chatham Dockyard on 23 September 1856. He ended his career as Commander-in-Chief, The Nore from 1882 until he retired in 1884 and was promoted to full Admiral three days after his retirement.

== Pacific Station service ==
On 16 February 1861, she was undocked as screw-propelled steam frigate, and it is assumed she went into reserve. As refitted, she now had a James Watt & co. engine with cylinders 64" in diameter 3 ft. stroke. 400 h.p. NHP. 1,568 ihp = 9.703 kts., making her a sailing ship with auxiliary steam power. She was rearmed with thirty ML 8-inch shell guns on her main deck and twenty 32-pounder guns 56cwt plus one 68-pounder gun 95cwt chaser on her upper deck. Leander's next commission started at Sheerness Dockyard on 23 May 1863, under Commodore Thomas Harvey, eldest son of Vice-Admiral Sir Thomas Harvey. She sailed for Pacific Station, where she served as the flagship of the Southern Division, based at Valparaíso. On 1 January 1866, she received a new captain, Commodore Michael de Courcy, remaining flagship of the Pacific Station Southern Division. De Courcy had previously served as captain of HMS Pylades (1854) on the Pacific Station from 1859 to 1861, and De Courcy Island on Canada's west coast is named for him. Under his command she was present for the Bombardment of Valparaíso on the 31 March 1866. Due to the damage inflicted on British property, while the Pacific Station commander, Admiral Henry Mangles Denham in HMS Sutlej and Leander, stood by and watched, it was described as "a Spanish victory over Britain". Her final captain, William Dowell, took command on 16 June 1866 and brought her home to Sheerness Dockyard for decommission on 17 November 1866. She was sold to the shipbreaking firm of Castle & Beech of New Charlton, London April 1867 for breaking up. Like most other screw frigate conversions of the period she was obsolete when completed and only had one commission.
