= Edward Royd Rice =

English cricketer and politician

The Right Honourable Edward Royd Rice JP DL

Member of Parliament for Dover
- In office 25 July 1837 – 28 March 1857 Serving with Sir John Reid, Bt, Sir George Clerk, Bt, Viscount Chelsea
- Preceded by: John Minet Fector; Sir John Reid, Bt
- Succeeded by: Ralph Bernal Osborne; Sir William Russell, Bt

High Sheriff of Kent
- In office 1830–1830
- Preceded by: Thomas Rider
- Succeeded by: Baden Powell

Personal details
- Born: Edward Royd Rice; 25 April 1790 Dover, Kent
- Died: 27 November 1878 (aged 88) Eastry, Kent
- Party: Whig
- Spouse: Elizabeth Knight (m. 1818; died 1878)
- Relations: Walter Francis Rice (grandson); The 12th Earl of Winchilsea (grandson); The 13th Earl of Winchilsea (grandson); Harold Finch-Hatton (grandson)
- Children: 15, including Sir Edward, Ernest
- Parent(s): Henry Rice; Sarah Samson
- Cricket career

Cricket information

Domestic team information
- Years: Team
- 1826: Middlesex
- 1834: England
- Source: CricketArchive, 2 June 2013

Edward Royd Rice JP DL (25 April 1790 – 27 November 1878) was an English politician and cricketer. He was Member of Parliament for Dover from 1847 to 1857.

== Early life ==
Rice was born on 25 April 1790 in Dover, Kent. He was the third son of Henry Rice, Esq. of Brambling House, near Wingham, Kent, and Sarah Samson (a daughter of J. Samson, Esq.). His paternal grandfather was Walter Rice, Esq. of Llwyn-y-Brain Hall, Carmarthenshire.

== Career ==
In 1830, he was High Sheriff of Kent.

From 1837 to 1857, Rice served as a Whig Member of Parliament for Dover.

=== Cricket career ===
In cricket, he was associated with Middlesex and was active from 1826 to 1834, being recorded in two matches in which he totalled 22 runs with a highest score of 13.

== Personal life ==
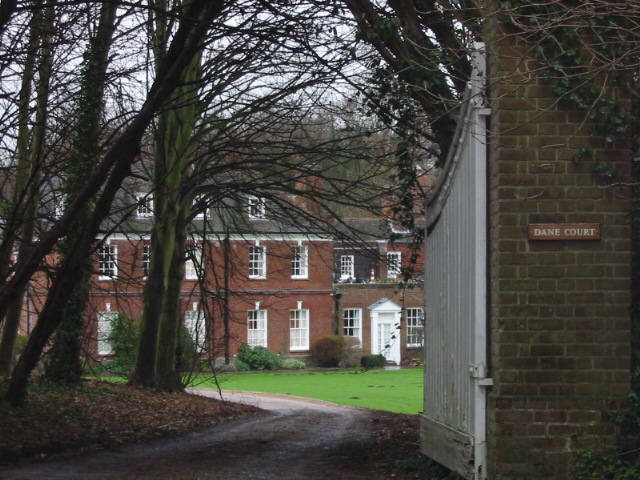
The Rice family seat, Dane Court

On 6 October 1818, Rice was married to Elizabeth Knight (1800–1884), the sixth (of eleven) child of Edward Austen Knight of Godmersham Park (who added Knight to his surname to inherit from his relative, Thomas Knight) and Elizabeth Bridges (herself the daughter of Sir Brook Bridges, 3rd Baronet). Through her father, she was niece of author Jane Austen. Together, they lived at Dane Court in Tilmanstone, Kent, and were the parents of ten sons and five daughters:

- Sir Edward Bridges Rice (1819–1902), an Admiral with the Royal Navy; he married Cecilia Caroline Harcourt, daughter of Rev. William Vernon Harcourt, of Nuneham Park, in 1864.
- Henry Rice (1821–1849), a Captain with the 72nd Highlanders.
- Frances Margaretta "Fanny" Rice (1820–1909), who married, as his third wife, George Finch-Hatton, 10th Earl of Winchilsea, in 1849.
- John Morland Rice (1823–1897), the Rector of Bramber who married Caroline Penelope York, daughter of Edward York of Wighill Park, in 1861.
- Marianne Sophia Rice (1826–1903), who married the Rev. Sir Emilius Bayley, 3rd Baronet, in 1855.
- George Augustus Rice (1827–1853), a Commander with the Royal Navy.
- Charles Augustus Rice (1829–1905), a Major with the Royal Engineers; he married his cousin, Adela Mary Margaretta Knight, third surviving daughter of Edward Knight of Chawton House, in 1875.
- Cecil Rice (1831–1917), a Lt.-Col. with the 72nd Highlanders; he married Anne Frances "Fanny" Napier, descendant of the 6th Lord Napier. After her death in 1884, he married Lady Matilda Horatia Seymour, daughter of Admiral Sir George Seymour and sister to Francis Seymour, 5th Marquess of Hertford.
- Walter Brook Rice (1837–1892), a Major General with the British Army.
- Arthur Rice (1838–1861), a Lt. with the 72nd Highlanders.
- Ernest Rice (1840–1927), also an Admiral who achieved flag rank in the Royal Navy; he married Laura Marianne York, another daughter of Edward York of Wighill Park, in 1870. After her death, he married Fanny Julia Dawkins, daughter of Clinton George Augustus Dawkins, Consul-General to Vienna, in 1903.
- Lionel Knight Rice (1844–1929), who married Eleanor Murray, daughter of Robert Hay Murray, Esq., in 1878.

Rice died on 27 November 1878 in Eastry, Kent, and was buried at St. Andrew Churchyard in Tilmanstone.

=== Descendants ===
Through his son Cecil, he was a grandfather of Walter Francis Rice, Lieutenant Governor of British Crown Colony of Burma.

Through his daughter Fanny, he was a grandfather of Murray Finch-Hatton, 12th Earl of Winchilsea, Henry Finch-Hatton, 13th Earl of Winchilsea, Lady Evelyn Georgiana Finch-Hatton (who married the 4th Viscount Templetown), and Harold Finch-Hatton.

Honorary titles
| Preceded by Thomas Rider | High Sheriff of Kent; 1830–1830 | Succeeded by Baden Powell |
Parliament of the United Kingdom
| Preceded by John Minet Fector; Sir John Reid, Bt | Member of Parliament for Dover; 1837–1857; With: Sir John Reid, Bt (1837–1847); Sir George Clerk, Bt (1847–1852); Viscount Chelsea (1852–1857) | Succeeded by Ralph Bernal Osborne; Sir William Russell, Bt |

== Bibliography ==
- Haygarth, Arthur (1996) [1862]. Scores & Biographies, Volume 1 (1744–1826). Kennington: Frederick Lillywhite. ISBN 978-19-00592-23-9.
- Haygarth, Arthur (1997) [1862]. Scores & Biographies, Volume 2 (1827–1840). Kennington: Frederick Lillywhite. ISBN 978-19-00592-23-9.
