= Ernest Rice (Royal Navy officer) =

Royal Navy Admiral (1840–1927)

Admiral Sir Ernest Rice KCB
- Born: 24 February 1840
- Died: 15 April 1927 (aged 87)
- Relatives: Edward Royd Rice (father); Sir Edward Bridges Rice (brother)
- Military career
- Allegiance: United Kingdom
- Rank: Admiral

Admiral Sir Ernest Rice KCB (24 February 1840 – 15 April 1927) was a Royal Navy officer.

== Early life ==
He was the youngest son of the politician Edward Royd Rice and the brother of Admiral Sir Edward Bridges Rice.

== Career ==
Rice entered HMS Britannia in June 1854. As a midshipman on HMS Odin, he took part in the Crimean War in the Baltic. He was involved in the failed attack on Gamla Carleby (now Kokkola), and was also present at the Battle of Bomarsund and the Bombardment of Sveaborg.

He was promoted to captain on 25 March 1878. In April 1880, he was appointed naval attaché for Europe, where he resided in Paris. There he conducted negotiations regarding the joint French and British protection of the Suez Canal.

On 6 March 1889, as captain of the Sultan, Rice ran his ship onto an uncharted rock in the channel between Comino and Malta during torpedo firing exercises. The ship remained stranded until she sank on 14 March after an extensive effort to refloat her. At the resulting court martial in April, as the only officer charged, Rice was acquitted of negligence but was reprimanded for an error of judgment in running his ship too close to the five-fathom line.

He was promoted to vice admiral on 13 July 1899. In May 1903 he was appointed in command of Coastguard and Naval Reserves, and he was promoted to full admiral on 15 March 1904. He was placed on the retired list on 24 February 1905.

== Personal life ==
On 22 September 1870, he married Laura Marianne York (1846–1899), daughter of Edward York and Penelope Sykes. Before her death in 1899, they were the parents of:

- Laura Gwenllian Rice (1871–1952), who married Walter James, 3rd Baron Northbourne, in 1894. After his death in 1932, she married architect William Curtis Green.

After her death in 1899, he married Fanny Julia Dawkins, daughter of Clinton George Augustus Dawkins, Consul-General to Vienna, and Marianne Jane Robarts, on 12 September 1903.

Sir Ernest died in Kent on 15 April 1927.
