= Charles Fyshe Palmer =

British politician (1769–1843)

Charles Fyshe Palmer (1769 – 24 January 1843) was a British politician. He was the nephew of Thomas Fyshe Palmer.

Palmer lived at Luckley Park at Wokingham in Berkshire. He married Madeline, the daughter of the Duke of Gordon. He stood for the Whigs in Reading at the 1818 UK general election, winning the seat. He held the seat until 1826, and again from 1827 until the 1835 UK general election, when he stood down. At the 1837 UK general election, he again stood in Reading, winning a seat, and serving until 1841, when he retired once more.
