= Gatford =

Gatford is a surname. Notable people with the surname include:

- Ian Gatford (1940-2026), British Anglican clergyman
- Lionel Gatford (priest, died 1665), royalist Church of England clergyman
- Lionel Gatford (priest, died 1715), English Anglican priest, Archdeacon of St Albans

== See also ==
- Gafford (disambiguation)
