= Great Tew Circle =

British group of clerics and literary figures

The Great Tew Circle was a group of clerics and literary figures who gathered in the 1630s at the manor house of Great Tew, Oxfordshire in southern England, and in London.

Lord Clarendon referred to the Circle as "A college situate in a purer air", referring to its pursuit of truth away from the partisan passions of the town. The house was the property of the noble Cary family, and the circle was brought together by Lucius Cary, who became 2nd Viscount Falkland on the death of his father in 1633. The most prominent of those taking part was Edward Hyde, the future 1st Earl of Clarendon, who after 1660 would become known as a leading statesman, and then a historian.

== Views ==
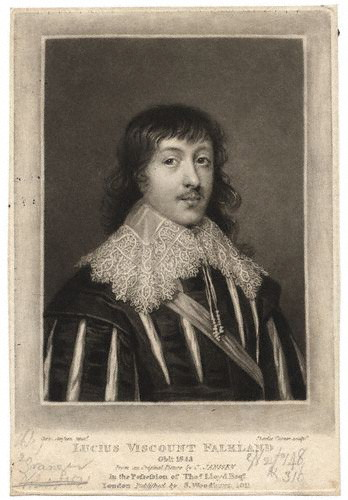
Late engraving (1811) of Lord Falkland, after a portrait by Cornelis Janssens van Ceulen

In the vexed religious climate of the time, the Circle was heterodox, inclining to sympathy with Socinianism. The favoured approach of some of those involved has been defined as "Arminian humanism", and in any case opposed to rigid Calvinism. In politics, their views were essentially conservative and royalist. The central religious figure of the Circle was William Chillingworth. Falkland himself had a Catholic convert, Elizabeth Cary, Lady Falkland, for his mother, and found the tolerant approach of Erasmus attractive. He organised the circle with his wife Lettice.

== Influences ==
Major influences on the thinking of the circle were Hugo Grotius and Richard Hooker because of the place the latter made for the use of reason in Biblical interpretation and church polity. These writers formed part of the broader Christian humanist tradition of Jacobus Acontius, George Cassander, Sebastian Castellio, Bernardino Ochino and Faustus Socinus. The anti-patristic views of Jean Daillé were also significant. According to the writings of Hyde (as Lord Clarendon), the gatherings and discussions themselves were modelled on those of Cicero and Erasmus, with guests being welcome to differ on points of view. Discourse also took place around the dinner table, with Clarendon likening the "Convivium Philosophicum or Convivium Theologicum ("philosophical-" or "theological feast") to Erasmus's Convivium Religiosum ("godly feast")."

== Tolerance, eirenicism, latitude ==
Chillingworth was influenced by Acontius, and the Circle read Acontius alongside Johannes Crellius, a Socinian. They found greater relevance in the eirenicism of Acontius than in the theology (Unitarianism) of Socinus himself. The context, as explained by the historian Hugh Trevor-Roper, was that of the Thirty Years' War with its Protestant defeats of the 1620s and Catholic expansion; but also of the doctrines of the contra-Remonstrants in an environment of increasing skepticism on religious matters. Falkland and Chillingworth had been seared by the "Pyrrhonian crisis" of skepticism rampant. Opposed to fideism, the Circle found in the use by Grotius of probabilism a more attractive option to deal with the challenge of skepticism.

Trevor-Roper supported the claims of the Great Tew group to the eirenic moral high ground on religious toleration and a commitment to rational dialogue on religion. This analysis has been challenged from the direction of the Circle's political thought, with its commitment to sovereignty. It has also been argued that these are two sides to the understanding of the period of the term "Socinian". The eirenic style was understood by Puritan opponents as Arminian rhetoric, and they moved away from compromise with it, to polemic and contemplation of war.

The major theologians of the circle (Chillingworth, Hales, Taylor) have regularly been claimed as precursors of the Latitudinarians, a term anachronistic before 1660. They are now considered to have paved the way for the Cambridge Platonists, in the attitude that there is no single basis for essential and true beliefs. The distinction now usual between the Cambridge Platonists and other Latitudinarians is a conventional one, introduced by John Tulloch in the 19th century.

== Participants ==
Participation in any actual dialogues as described by Hyde is problematic to establish; and the time scale has different points on it, though a beginning date of 1634 (Martinich) seems to be agreed widely. After about 1640 the troubled political situation overshadowed theoretical discussion and writing. The influence of the circle can be traced in theological production (especially Chillingworth's Religion of Protestants, 1638), literary works and translation in a humanist vein, and the political line pursued by Falkland and Hyde in 1640–1, attempting to find a middle position between Puritan and Laudian extremes.

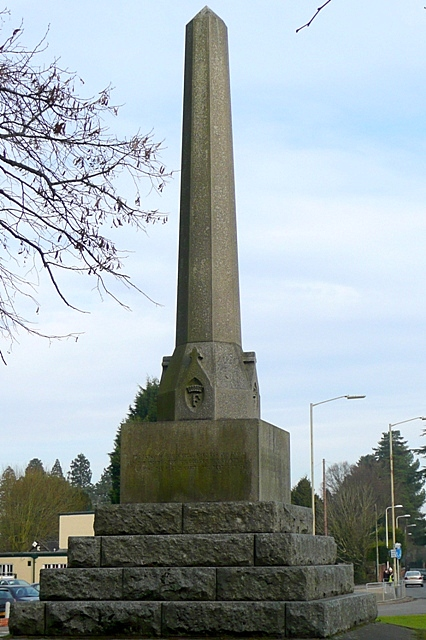
Memorial to Falkland, who died at the first battle of Newbury of 1643, fighting recklessly on the royalist side, some 30 miles south of Great Tew

Among those mentioned as being in Falkland's circle are:

Churchmen

- George Aglionby
- Thomas Barlow
- William Chillingworth
- Hugh Paulinus Cressy
- John Earle
- Charles Gataker
- John Hales
- Henry Hammond
- George Morley
- Walter Raleigh the cleric.
- Gilbert Sheldon
- Jeremy Taylor.

Men of letters

- Thomas Carew
- Charles Cotton (died 1658), father of Charles Cotton the poet.
- Abraham Cowley
- Sidney Godolphin
- George Sandys
- Sir John Suckling
- Thomas Triplet
- Edmund Waller

Politicians and lawyers

- Dudley Digges
- Edward Hyde
- John Selden

=== Associations ===
Since Great Tew was best known as an open house for Oxford scholars, and Falkland's contacts included a group centred on London and the court, it is artificial at best to assign membership in the circle to some who are known to have associated with the group.

- Thomas Hobbes. Whether Hobbes actually visited Great Tew is unclear; he possibly did so in 1634. His associations with the circle through friendships are more certain in a London context.
- Poets: Ben Jonson was on good terms with members of the circle, and visited Great Tew; Thomas May associated with the circle.
- Wits: George Digby and Sir John Vaughan.
- Katherine Jones, Viscountess Ranelagh, who moved to England from Ireland after the 1641 rebellion.
- Sons of Thomas Coventry, 1st Baron Coventry.
- Francis Wenman and Henry Rainsford, friends and neighbours of Falkland, linked to the Virginia Company of London.
- Robert Payne and Thomas Lockey, on the Great Tew–Oxford axis of the 1630s.
- The Catholics Kenelm Digby and Wat Montagu, possibly.
- Izaak Walton, biographer of Hooker, not likely to have participated at Great Tew, but close to a number of the Circle.

== Relationship to other groups ==
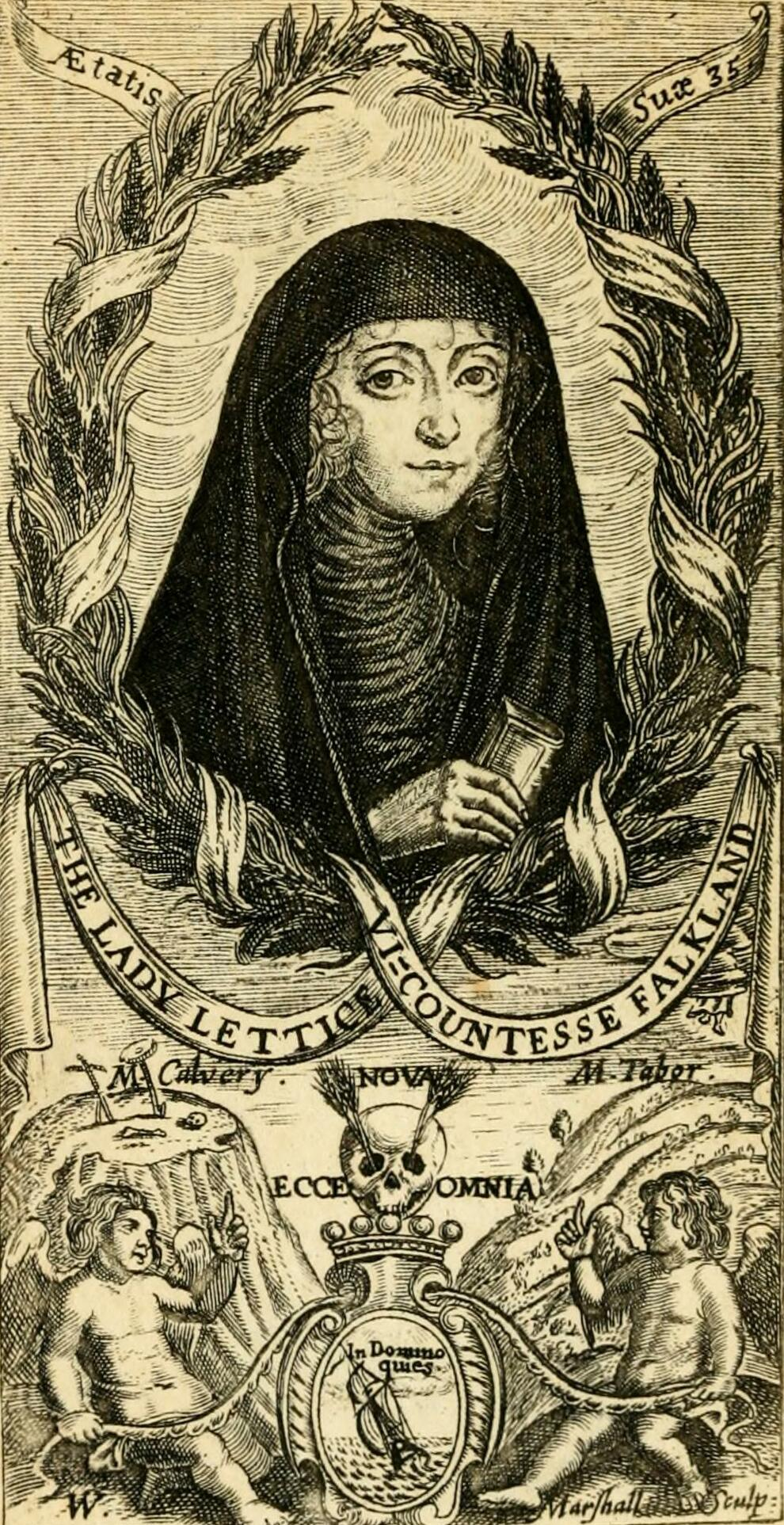
Lettice Cary, Viscountess Falkland, as a widow

Falkland himself is identified as one of the Tribe of Ben, the followers of Jonson; and others of the Circle were also in the Tribe. Falkland also gave the first of the poetical tributes in the 1638 Oxford memorial volume Jonson Virbius, and others of the Circle who contributed were Henry Coventry, May and Digges.

Hales and Chillingworth have been identified with an "Oxford School of rational theology", containing also Christopher Potter and William Page. It has been said that, despite the political difference over the defence of episcopacy, there is no clear distinction between the Great Tew line and Laudianism in theology. Falkland, Hyde and Sir John Colepepper were leaders of the "Country Alliance" of 1640.

Katherine Jones was someone common to the Great Tew Circle and the Hartlib Circle. Robert Payne was a central figure in the so-called Welbeck Academy, around the Cavendishes, with which Hobbes was more closely associated than with Great Tew.

The widowed Lady Falkland (Lettice) took in John Duncon, brother of Eleazar Duncon and Edmund Duncon, who had lost his Essex rectory during the Civil war. He later wrote her biography (1648, in the form of an exchange of letters). It has been suggested that the household was run on lines similar to the Little Gidding community.
