= Lionel Gatford =

Lionel Gatford may refer to:

- Lionel Gatford (priest, died 1665), royalist Church of England clergyman
- Lionel Gatford (priest, died 1715), English Anglican priest, Archdeacon of St Albans
