= Lettice Cary, Viscountess Falkland =

English noblewoman

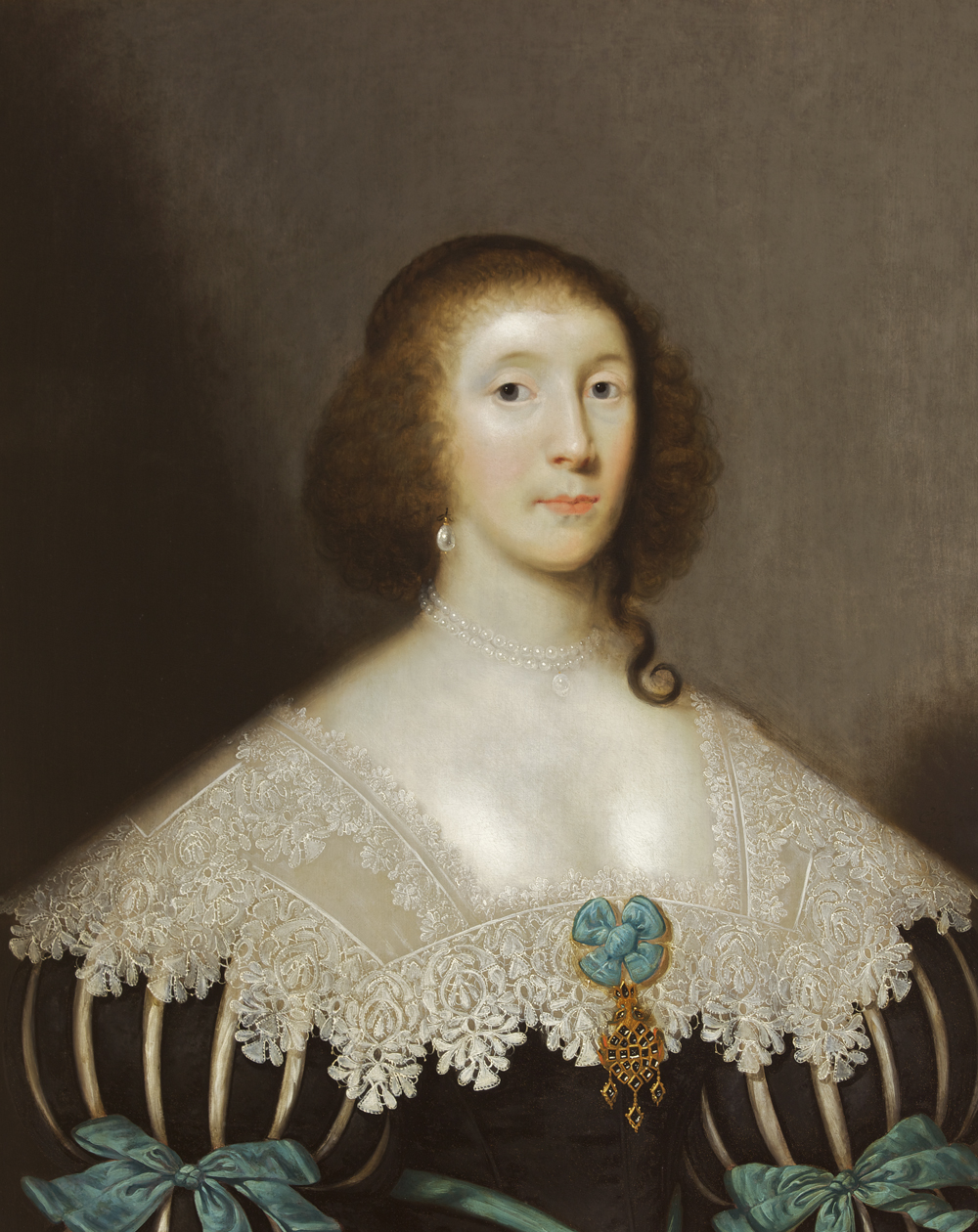
- A portrait by Cornelius Johnson
- Born: Lettice Morison (or Moryson) c. 1612
- Died: 1647; Great Tew
- Occupation: Noblewoman
- Spouse: Lucius Cary, 2nd Viscount Falkland
- Children: Lucius Cary, 3rd Viscount Falkland; Henry Cary, 4th Viscount Falkland
- Parent: Sir Richard Moryson

Lettice Cary, Viscountess Falkland, also known as Letitia Cary, (née Moryson; c. 1612–1647) was an English noblewoman. She married Sir Lucius Cary, who later became 2nd Viscount Falkland. Together they had four sons and hosted the Great Tew Circle, before he died in the First English Civil War. The Anglican and Royalist Cary then devoted herself to religious causes and died at the age of about 35.

== Life ==
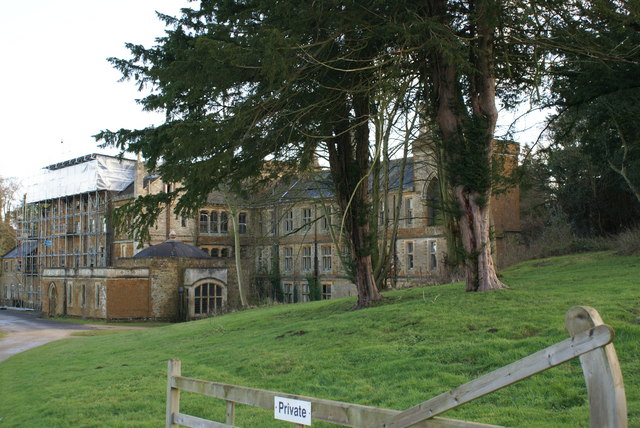
Great Tew manor house

Lettice (or Letitia) Morison (or Moryson) was born c. 1612 to mother Mary and father Sir Richard, who was Lieutenant-General of the Ordnance. She had one brother, Henry. She spent her childhood at Tooley Park in Leicestershire, then in 1630 married a friend of her brother, Sir Lucius Cary. Her husband's father the 1st Viscount Falkland was against the marriage because she was not wealthy and so they moved to the Dutch Republic, in the Hague, where he sought military employment. She gave birth to four sons between 1632 and 1639, becoming Viscountess Falkland in 1633 when her husband's father died and he inherited the position of Viscount Falkland. They then lived at Burford Priory and Great Tew manor, both in Oxfordshire.

Together the couple hosted the Great Tew Circle in the 1630s, a discussion group based on the teachings of Jacobus Arminius which featured philosopher William Chillingworth and historian Edward Hyde who later became 1st Earl of Clarendon and Lord Chancellor. Hyde described Cary as "a lady of most extraordinary wit and judgement, and of the most signal virtue and exemplary life that the age produced".

Having become Secretary of State in 1642, Lucius Cary died at the First Battle of Newbury during the First English Civil War the following year. Cary's oldest son (also named Lucius) died in 1645 and her son Henry took the title of viscount.

Grief at losing her husband and eldest son pushed the devout Cary further towards religion. Under the chaplaincy of John Duncon, brother of Eleazar Duncon, she followed a pious lifestyle, donating money to serve the poor and building a school at Great Tew. She kept her Royalist and Anglican beliefs, but had Presbyterian and Roman Catholic acquaintances. Cary died at home of tuberculosis on 24 February 1647 and was buried in Great Tew church.

== Legacy ==
Cary had her portrait painted by Cornelius Johnson. Duncon wrote a biography of Cary entitled The Returns of Spirituall Comfort which was reprinted three times between 1648 and 1653, and it was also republished in 1908. Cary was the only woman to be featured in Clement Barksdale's 1661 compendium Memorials of Worthy Persons.
