= Walter Raleigh (priest) =

English divine

Walter Raleigh or Ralegh (1586 – 10 October 1646) was an English divine, Dean of Wells from 1641. He died after a violent attack as a prisoner in his own deanery.

== Life ==
Raleigh was the second son of Sir Walter Raleigh's elder brother, Sir Carew Raleigh, of Downton, Wiltshire. His mother was Dorothy, widow of Sir John Thynne, of Longleat, Wiltshire, and daughter of Sir William Wroughton, of Broad Hinton, Wiltshire. He was educated at Winchester School and at Magdalen Hall, Oxford, where he matriculated as commoner on 5 November 1602. He graduated B.A. in 1605 and M.A. in 1608.

Raleigh took holy orders, and in 1618 became chaplain to William Herbert, 3rd Earl of Pembroke. In 1620 he was presented by his patron to the rectory of Chedzoy, near Bridgwater, Somerset; in the following year he received the rectory of Wilton St Mary, Wiltshire. About 1630 he was chosen a chaplain-in-ordinary to Charles I, who admired his preaching. In 1632 he was made rector of Elingdon or Wroughton, and in 1635 of Street, Somerset. In 1634 he was minor prebendary of Combe in Wells Cathedral, and received besides the rectory of Street-cum-Walton. In 1636 he was created D.D. In 1637 he became dean and rector of St Buryan, Cornwall, and in 1641 he was chosen to succeed Dr George Warburton as dean of Wells.

Among Raleigh's friends were Lucius Cary, 2nd Viscount Falkland, Henry Hammond, William Chillingworth, and Edward Hyde, Earl of Clarendon. A royalist and a member of the Falkland circle, Raleigh suffered during the First English Civil War. While he was attending the king, his rectory-house at Chedzoy was plundered by the parliamentarians, his property stolen, his cattle driven away, and his wife and children expelled from their home. But in the western counties fortune was for some time favourable to the king, and Raleigh was enabled to return to Chedzoy. He continued to live there in safety until the defeat of George Goring, lord Goring, at Langport in 1645. Raleigh then fled to Bridgwater, and on the fall of the town (21 July 1645) surrendered to the parliamentarians. From Bridgwater he was sent a prisoner to Chedzoy, but on account of his weakness he was allowed to live in free custody in his own house.

The departure of Fairfax and Cromwell was for Raleigh the beginning of new troubles. One Henry Jeanes, being anxious, it is said, to secure the rectory for himself, carried off the dean to Ilchester, and there had him lodged in the county gaol. From Ilchester the prisoner was removed to Banwell, and then to the deanery, Wells, where he was entrusted to the care of David Barrett, a shoemaker.

== Death ==
Raleigh was harshly dealt with, and mortally wounded in a scuffle. According to Simon Patrick, Raleigh was murdered while attempting to screen from Barrett's curiosity a letter that he had written to his wife. He died on 10 October 1646, and was buried in the choir of Wells Cathedral, before the dean's stall.

Raleigh's eldest son George attempted to bring Barrett to justice. A priest-vicar of Wells named Standish was arrested for having permitted the burial of the dean in the cathedral, and kept in custody. The handling of these matters in the Sufferings of the Clergy by John Walker, half a century later, has been used to illustrate the methods and problems of Walker's historiography.

== Works ==
Raleigh's papers were preserved in the family, and thirteen of his sermons were given by his widow to Simon Patrick, who published them in 1679, with a biographical notice, and a Latin poem written in praise of Raleigh by a Cambridge admirer, who is probably Patrick himself. The volume is entitled Reliquiæ Raleighanæ, being Discourses and Sermons on several subjects, by the Reverend Dr. Walter Raleigh. The editor praises Raleigh's quickness of wit, ready elocution, and mental powers, but says that he 'was led to imitate too far a very eminent man,' whose name is not given.

In 1719 Laurence Howell published Certain Queries proposed by Roman Catholicks, and answered by Dr. Walter Raleigh, with an account of Raleigh copied from Patrick. Of a tract on the millennium which Raleigh is said to have written, no trace remains.

== Family ==
Between 1620 and 1623 Raleigh married Maria, daughter of Sir Ralph Gibbs. During the civil war she took refuge at Downton, where she was joined by her husband.
