= George Morley (bishop) =

English bishop (1598–1684)

The Right Reverend George Morley
- George Morley, as Bishop of Winchester
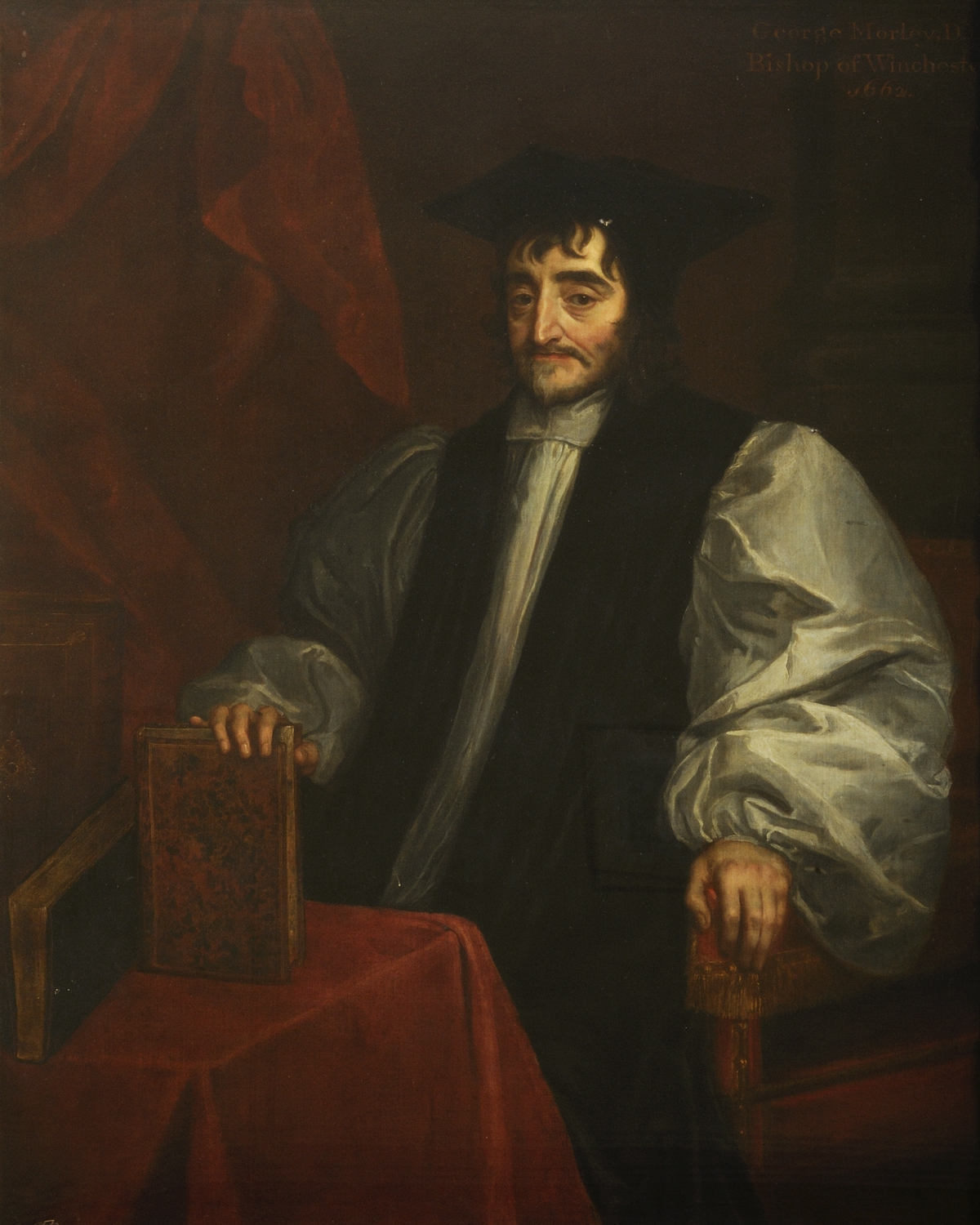
- Portrait by Peter Lely
- Church: Church of England
- Diocese: Winchester
- See: Bishop of Winchester
- In office: May 1662 to October 1684
- Predecessor: Brian Duppa
- Successor: Peter Mews
- Other posts: Dean of Christ Church (26 July 1660–1660); Bishop of Worcester (1660–1662); Dean of the Chapel Royal (1663 – February 1668)

Personal details
- Born: 27 February 1598 Cheapside, London
- Died: 29 October 1684 (aged 86) Farnham, Surrey, England
- Buried: Winchester Cathedral
- Denomination: Church of England
- Residence: Farnham Castle (at death)
- Parents: Francis Morley & Sarah née Denham
- Education: Christ Church, Oxford

Ordination history of George Morley
History
Episcopal consecration
- Consecrated by: Brian Duppa
- Date: 28 October 1660
- Place: Henry VII Chapel

George Morley (27 February 1598 – 29 October 1684) was a senior member of the Church of England from London, who served as Bishop of Worcester from 1660 to 1662, and of Winchester from 1662 to 1684.

== Early life ==
Morley was born in London, England, in February 1598, to Francis Morley and Sarah Denham (Sir John Denham was a cousin), and was educated at Westminster School and then at Christ Church, Oxford.

While both men were students there, Edmund Waller saw him being arrested for outstanding debts––Morley was penniless at the time––and upon learning that Morley was a distant relative of his, and being impressed by Morley's wit, Waller persuaded him to come down to his home in Beaconsfield. Edmund Gosse writes that Morley "in these early days ... was secular and humanistic in his proclivities, and it is said ... that it was mainly due to him that Waller seriously undertook to cultivate poetry." Morley would spend the next ten years alternatively living with the Wallers and as domestic chaplain to Robert Dormer, 1st Earl of Carnarvon.

Morley graduated BA, 1618, and MA, 1621. Throughout the 1620s and 1630s he moved in the illustrious intellectual political circles of Lucius Cary, 2nd Viscount Falkland at Great Tew. In 1640, he was presented to the sinecure living of Hartfield, Sussex, and in the following year he was made canon of Christ Church, Oxford and exchanged Hartfield for the rectory of Mildenhall, Wiltshire.

He preached before the House of Commons in 1642, but his sermon gave offence, and when in 1647 he took a prominent part in resisting the parliamentary visitation of Oxford University he was deprived of his canonry and living.

Leaving England, he joined the court of Charles II, and became one of the leading clergy at The Hague. Shortly before the Restoration he came to England on a highly successful mission to gain for Charles the support of the Presbyterians. In 1660, he regained his canonry, and soon became Dean of Christ Church. In the same year, he became Bishop of Worcester. He was elected to the See on 9 October, confirmed 23 October, and consecrated a bishop on 28 October. At the Savoy Conference of 1661 he was chief representative of the bishops. He was translated to the See of Winchester in 1662 and made Dean of the Chapel Royal in 1663, a position he held until dismissed by Charles II in 1668.

== Works ==
His works are few and chiefly polemical, e.g. The Bishop of Worcester's to a friend for Vindication of himself from the Calumnies of Mr. Richard Baxter.

== Sources ==
- "Morley, George". Oxford Dictionary of National Biography (online ed.). Oxford University Press. doi:10.1093/ref:odnb/19285. (Subscription, Wikipedia Library access or UK public library membership required.)

Academic offices
Preceded by Edward Reynolds	Dean of Christ Church, Oxford; 1660	Succeeded by John Fell
Church of England titles
Vacant Commonwealth Title last held by John Prideaux	Bishop of Worcester; 1660–1662	Succeeded by John Gauden
Preceded by Brian Duppa	Bishop of Winchester; 1662–1684	Succeeded by Peter Mews
Preceded by Gilbert Sheldon, Bishop of London	Dean of the Chapel Royal; 1663–1668	Succeeded by Herbert Croft, Bishop of Hereford
