= Gilbert Sheldon =

Archbishop of Canterbury from 1663 to 1677

The Most Reverend and Right Honourable Gilbert Sheldon
- Archbishop of Canterbury
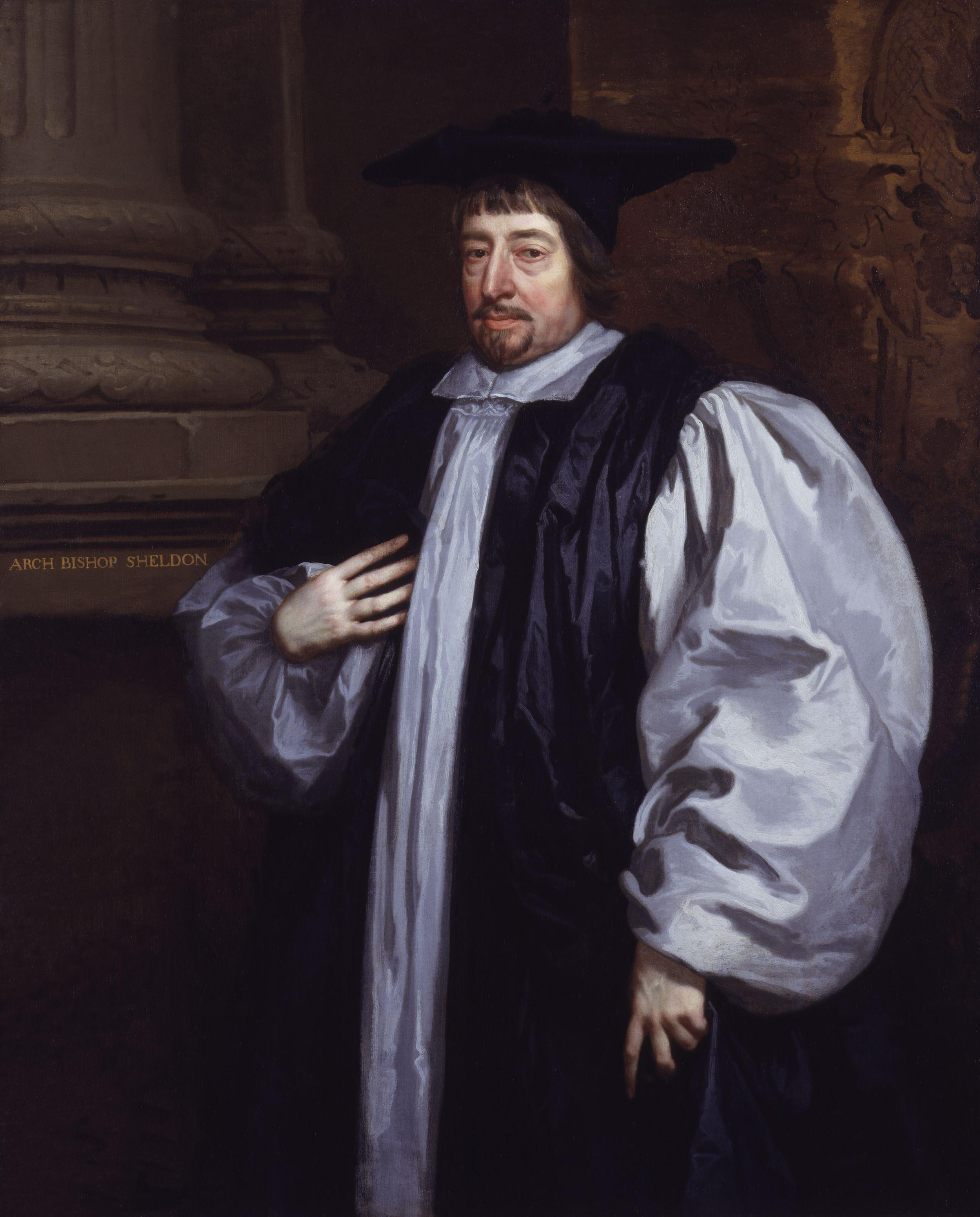
- Portrait by Peter Lely
- Church: Church of England
- Province: Province of Canterbury
- Diocese: Diocese of Canterbury
- Elected: 11 August 1663 (elected); 31 August 1663 (election confirmed)
- Installed: 7 September 1663 (by proxy)
- Term ended: 9 November 1677 (death)
- Predecessor: William Juxon
- Successor: William Sancroft
- Other posts: Dean of the Chapel Royal (1660–1663); Bishop of London (1660–1663); Master of the Savoy (1660–1663); Chancellor of the University of Oxford (1667–1669)

Personal details
- Born: 19 June 1598 Stanton, Staffordshire
- Died: 9 November 1677 (aged 79) Lambeth Palace, Surrey
- Buried: Croydon parish church, Surrey
- Denomination: Anglican
- Parents: Roger Sheldon
- Profession: Theologian
- Education: Trinity College, Oxford

Ordination history of Gilbert Sheldon
History
Diaconal ordination
- Ordained by: John Howson (Oxford)
- Date: 23 May 1624
- Place: Dorchester on Thames
Episcopal consecration
- Principal consecrator: Brian Duppa (Winch.)
- Co-consecrators: Accepted Frewen (York), Matthew Wren (Ely), John Warner (Rochester), Henry King (Chichester)
- Date: 28 October 1660
- Place: Henry VII Chapel, Westminster Abbey

Gilbert Sheldon (19 June 1598 – 9 November 1677) was an English religious leader who served as the Archbishop of Canterbury from 1663 until his death.

== Early life ==
Sheldon was born in Stanton, Staffordshire in the parish of Ellastone, on 19 June 1598, the youngest son of Roger Sheldon; his father worked for Gilbert Talbot, 7th Earl of Shrewsbury. He was educated at Trinity College, Oxford; he matriculated at Oxford on 1 July 1614, graduated BA from Trinity College on 27 November 1617, and MA(Oxon) on 28 June 1620. In 1619, he was incorporated at Cambridge. In 1622 he was elected fellow of All Souls' College, where he took the degrees of BD on 11 November 1628 and DD on 25 June 1634. In 1622, he was ordained, and shortly afterwards he became domestic chaplain to Thomas Coventry, 1st Baron Coventry.

In March 1636 he was elected warden of All Souls' on the death of Richard Astley. He had already made the acquaintance of William Laud, and corresponded with him on college business, university politics, and on the conversion of William Chillingworth from Roman Catholicism. Sheldon was not initially a Laudian, and he resisted (unsuccessfully) Laud's appointment of Jeremy Taylor to a fellowship at All Souls'. In 1634 and 1640 he was pro-vice-chancellor. In 1638 he was on the commission of visitation for Merton College; the visit produced a report requiring reforms.

During the years 1632–1639 he received the livings of Hackney (1633); Oddington, Oxfordshire; Ickford, Buckinghamshire (1636); and Newington, Oxfordshire; besides being a prebendary of Gloucester from 1632. Sheldon gravitated towards the Great Tew circle of Lucius Cary (Falkland), and was on friendly terms with Edward Hyde; he had no Puritan sympathies. He became a royal chaplain through Coventry, and the king intended preferment for him, plans interrupted by the political crises.

== Civil War period ==
He was intimate with the Royalist leaders, and participated in the negotiations for the Uxbridge treaty of 1645. During this period he became with Henry Hammond one of the churchmen closest to the king, and attended him as Clerk of the Closet in Oxford, later in Newmarket, Suffolk and finally in the Isle of Wight. When the parliamentarians occupied Oxford in 1646 he resisted the visitation, but was finally and physically ejected from All Souls in early 1648. Taken into custody, he was to have been imprisoned in Wallingford Castle with Hammond but the commander was unwilling to have them. He was freed, with restrictions on his movements, later that year.

He lived quietly for a dozen years in the Midlands, at Snelston in Derbyshire or with friends in Staffordshire, Nottinghamshire and Glamorgan, where he stayed with Sir John Aubrey. He was active in fundraising for the poor clergy and for Charles II in exile. He corresponded with Jeremy Taylor, whom he supported, and with Hyde. On the death of John Palmer, whom the visitors had made warden of All Souls' in his place, on 4 March 1659, he was quietly reinstated.

== Bishop of London ==
On 21 September 1660, Sheldon was nominated Bishop of London; he was elected on 9 October and his election was confirmed on 23 October. On 28 October, he was consecrated in the Henry VII Chapel at Westminster Abbey; he had been made Dean of the Chapel Royal not long before and became Master of the Savoy not long after. Since William Juxon was now Archbishop of Canterbury, but was aged and infirm, Sheldon in practical terms exercised many of the powers of the archbishopric in the period to 1663, and he was on the privy council. He was commissioned to consecrate the new Scottish bishops.

The Savoy Conference of 1661 was held at his lodgings. He hardly participated but was understood to be pulling strings in terms of the outcome. In his formulation, Puritan objections should be set out and considered; the point of the Conference was liturgical, to look into reform of the Book of Common Prayer. The subsequent Uniformity Act 1662 was very much in line with Sheldon's thinking. The Act was a sequel to Sheldon's successful orchestration of opposition to Charles II's intended Declaration of Indulgence, earlier in 1662.

== Archbishop of Canterbury ==
He was translated to become Archbishop of Canterbury in 1663: the congé d'élire was issued on 14 July, Sheldon was elected on 11 August, royal assent was given on 20 August and his election was confirmed (in a legal ceremony by which he officially took his new post) on 31 August at Lambeth Palace; (Note: The bishops present to confirm Sheldon's election were: George Morley, Bishop of Winchester; William Piers, Bishop of Bath and Wells; Robert Skinner, Bishop of Oxford; Humphrey Henchman, Bishop of Salisbury; Seth Ward, Bishop of Exeter; and John Earle, Bishop of Worcester.) he was enthroned by proxy and vested with the temporalities on 7 September. He was greatly interested in the welfare of the University of Oxford, of which he became Chancellor in 1667, succeeding Lord Clarendon, as Hyde now was. The Sheldonian Theatre at Oxford was built and endowed at his expense. He was elected a Fellow of the Royal Society in 1665.

He accepted much purely secular work, acting as arbiter on petitions presented through him, and taking up investigations passed on by the king, especially in connection with the navy. Sheldon lost political influence after the fall of Clarendon in 1667, and by making Charles's philandering a matter of religious reproach. He was vocal against the Royal Declaration of Indulgence of 1672. He is depicted in a window in Gray's Inn Chapel.

Sheldon is mentioned in Pepys' Diary who relates a story from his "Cozen Roger" that "...the Archbishop of Canterbury that now is, do keep a wench, and that he is a very wencher as can be and tells us that is publicly known that Sir Charles Sedley had got away one of the Archbishop's wenches from him..." Such stories, spread by his enemies, were common. There is in fact no credible evidence that Sheldon led an immoral life, though Samuel Pepys's cousin Roger Pepys, a Puritan, may well have believed the gossip. A later entry in Pepys' Diary praises the Archbishop as a "stout and high spirited man", who openly spoke his mind to the King on matters of morality.

Sheldon never married: this may have inspired the gossip reported by Pepys about his immoral private life. His niece, Catherine, married John Dolben, Archbishop of York.

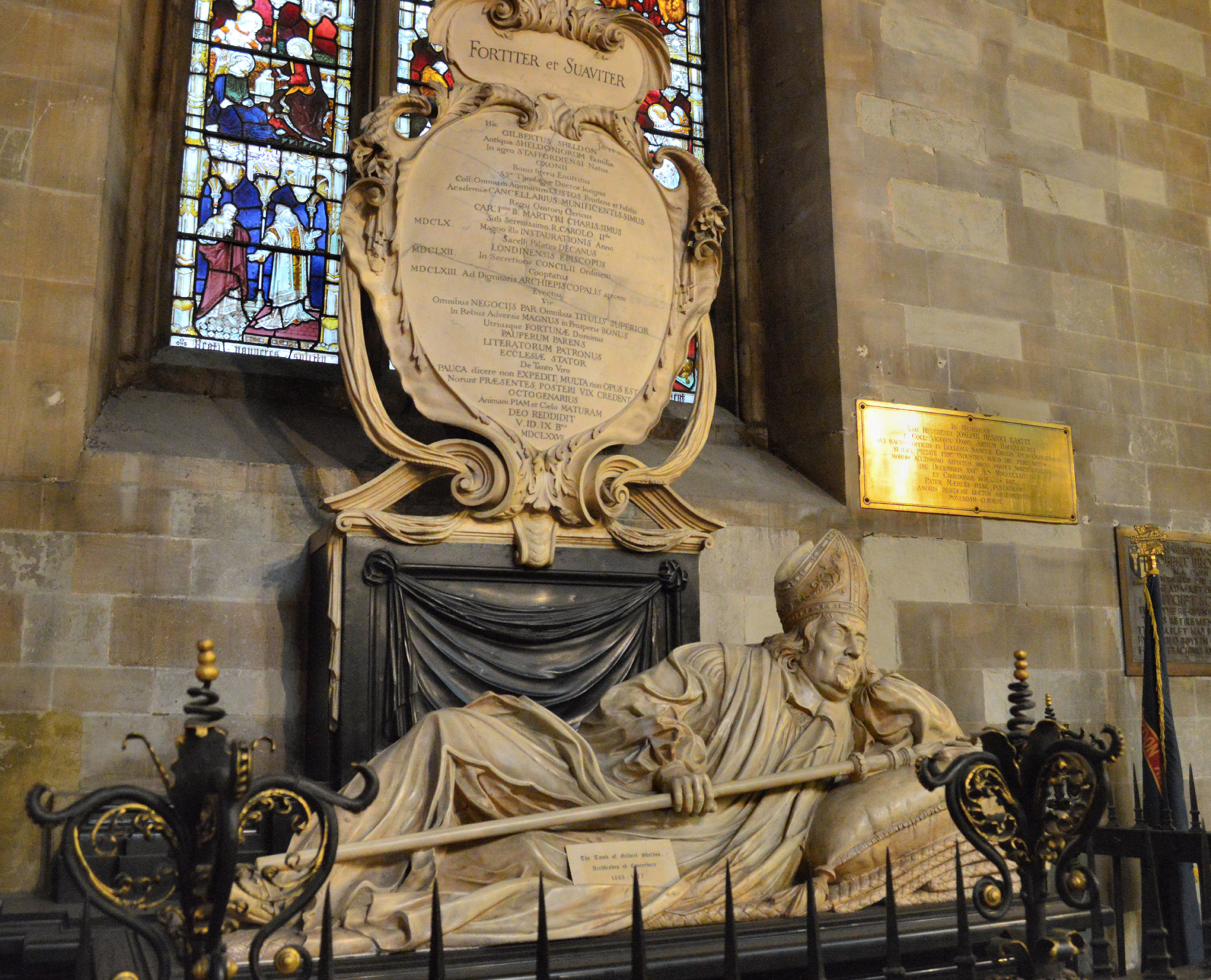
Tomb in Croydon Minster

Sheldon was buried in Croydon Parish Church, now renamed Croydon Minster.

== Arms ==
Coat of arms of Gilbert Sheldon

Notes
While serving as a bishop Sheldon's arms would be displayed impaled with the arms of the diocese and topped by a mitre.
Escutcheon
Argent on a chevron Gules three sheldrakes of the field on a canton of the second a rose Or.

== Sources ==
- This article incorporates text from a publication now in the public domain: "Sheldon, Gilbert". Dictionary of National Biography. London: Smith, Elder & Co. 1885–1900.

Church of England titles
Vacant Title last held by William Juxon	Bishop of London; 1660–1663	Succeeded by Humphrey Henchman
Preceded by William Juxon	Archbishop of Canterbury; 1663–1677	Succeeded by William Sancroft
Academic offices
Preceded by The Earl of Clarendon	Chancellor of the University of Oxford; 1667–1669	Succeeded by The Duke of Ormonde
