= Richard Moryson =

English politician

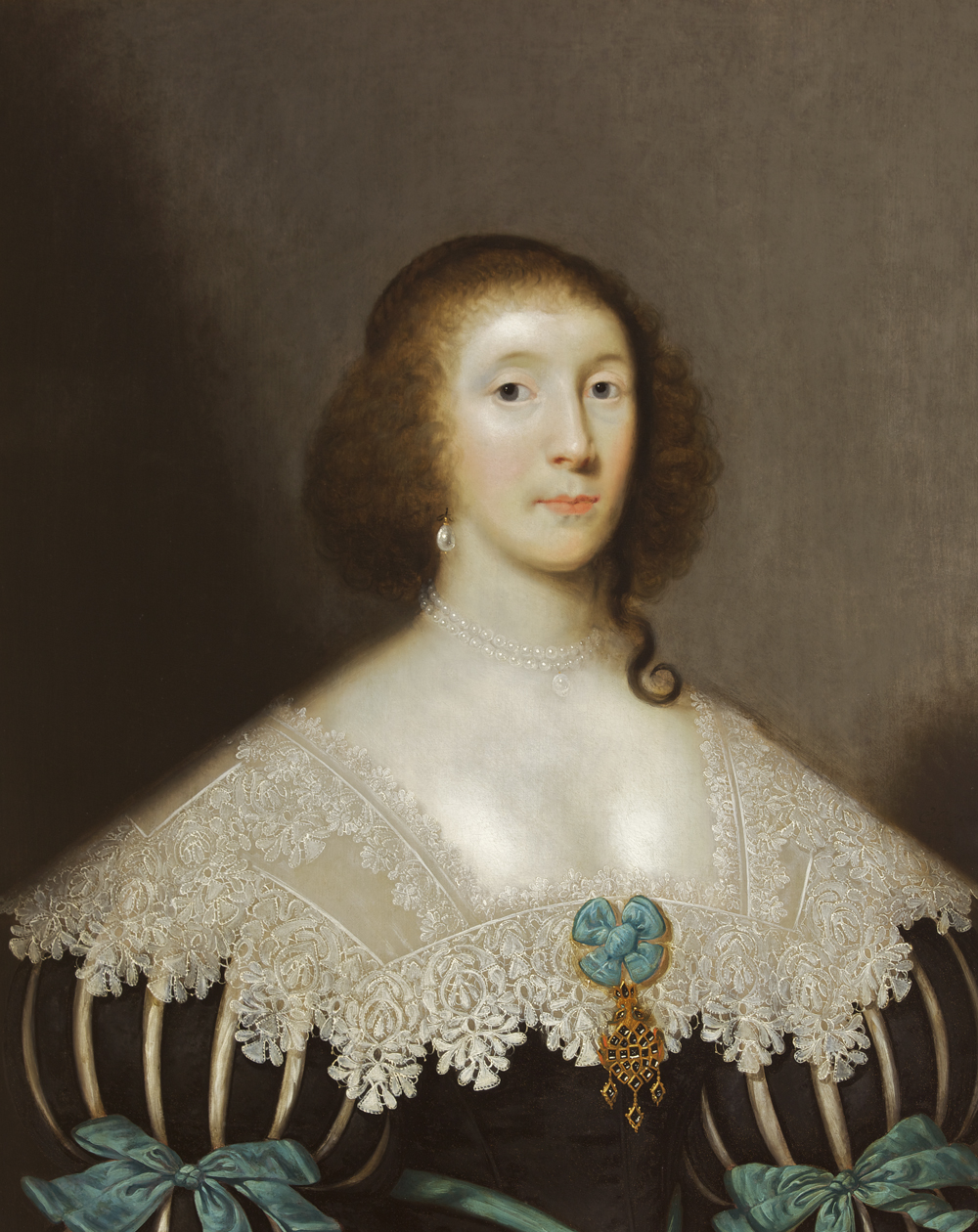
Richard Moryson married Elizabeth Harrington, with whom he had several children including Lettice (pictured).

Coat of Arms of Richard Moryson

Sir Richard Moryson (died 1625) was an English soldier and politician who sat in the House of Commons from 1621 to 1622.

Moryson was the son of Thomas Moryson and his wife Elizabeth Moigne, daughter of Thomas Moigne of North Willingham, Lincolnshire. His father was a Lincolnshire gentleman who had been member of parliament for Grimsby. Moryson became a soldier and served in the Netherlands. He was knighted on 5 August 1599 in Ireland by the Earl of Essex. Subsequently, he became Vice-President of Munster, and sat in the Irish House of Commons in the Irish Parliament of 1613–15 as member for Bandonbridge. After a "long and honourable stay" in Ireland, he returned to England in 1615 and settled at Tooley Park, Leicestershire. He was appointed Lieutenant General of the Ordnance and in 1621, he was elected Member of Parliament for Leicester.

Moryson wrote his will in 1624, adding a codicil on 29 August 1625, and was dead by the following 3 October.

Moryson married Elizabeth Harrington, daughter of Sir Henry Harrington. His son Francis became Governor of Virginia, and two other sons Richard and Robert also emigrated to Virginia. His daughter Lettice, or Letitia, married Lucius Cary, 2nd Viscount Falkland. His brother Fynes Moryson was a noted travel writer.

Parliament of England
| Preceded by Henry Rich; Sir Francis Leigh | Member of Parliament for Leicester; 1621–1622; With: Sir William Herrick | Succeeded by Sir Humphrey May; William Ive |
