= Henry Cary, 4th Viscount Falkland =

English politician

Custos Rotulorum of Oxfordshire
- In office 1660–1663

Lord Lieutenant of Oxfordshire
- In office 1660–1663

Member of Parliament for Oxford
- In office 1660–1661

Member of Parliament for Arundel
- In office 1660

Personal details
- Born: 1634
- Died: 2 April 1663 (aged 28–29)
- Spouse: Rachel Hungerford (m. 1653)
- Children: Anthony Cary
- Parents: Lucius Cary (father); Lettice Morison (mother)
- Relatives: Lucius Cary (brother); Henry Cary (grandfather)

Henry Cary, 4th Viscount Falkland (1634 – 2 April 1663) was an English politician who sat in the House of Commons between 1659 and 1663.

== Life ==
Cary was the son of Lucius Cary, 2nd Viscount Falkland and his wife Lettice Morison, daughter of Sir Richard Morison of Tooley Park, Leicestershire. He was educated at Hayes, Middlesex under Dr Thomas Triplett. He inherited the title Viscount Falkland after his brother Lucius Cary died in 1649 and travelled abroad in France in 1650. Cary like his father and elder brother, had Royalist sympathies and during the early years of the Interregnum his movements were monitored by the Council of State, but after William Lockhart of Lee, the Protector's ambassador in Paris, had assessed him, he was no longer perceived to be a serious threat to the new establishment.

In 1659, Cary was elected Member of Parliament for Oxfordshire in the Third Protectorate Parliament where he opposed recognition of the Other House. During the second Commonwealth period he sided against the Officers in charge of the New Model Army in London and was arrested for involvement in the proposed 1659 Royalist rising and sent to the Tower of London. In February 1660 he threw himself behind General George Monck when with other Oxfordshire gentry signed a declaration calling for a free parliament. The next month he was appointed justice of the peace and a commissioner for the militia for Oxfordshire.

Cary was returned as Member of Parliament for both Oxford and Arundel and chose to sit for Oxford in the Convention Parliament. He was an active in this parliament supporting Anglican and Royalists cause, and he was selected as one of the twelve members chosen to visit King Charles II in Holland and returned across the channel with the King. While Charles was in Canterbury, Cary returned to London carrying a letter from the King to Parliament.

During the debates over the Indemnity and Oblivion Bill Cary "took a strong line towards the regicides, and argued that any member who had sat in the high court of justice should be excluded from the house. Regarding individual parliamentarians, he wished to make William Sydenham and John Pyne liable for any penalty short of death, and he opposed the limited punishment proposed for Francis Lascelles."

In June 1660, shortly after the Restoration of King Charles II Cary was made a colonel of horse and gentleman of the privy chamber. From then until his sudden death in 1663 he was active at court and Royal service. In 1661 he was elected Member of Parliament for Oxfordshire in the Cavalier Parliament as well as holding various military commissions. He supported the crown during the debates on the Militia Bill that affirmed the crown's powers over the armed forces, but was in disfavour with some at court over his ardent support for the Act of Uniformity making clear his dislike of both Catholics and dissenters and not accepting the government's line that tolerance should be shown. In 1661 he was appointed colonel of foot in the Dunkirk garrison. In August 1662 he was elected to the Irish parliament for Fore and spent some time there, and in October 1662, after his regiment was disbanded, he was appointed captain of a troop of horse in Ireland. The same month he returned to London to resume his work on committees in the Commons.

Cary was the author of the play The Marriage Night. Set in Castile it had themes of tragedy and revenge, of which Samuel Pepys wrote in his diary after seeing it "a kind of a tragedy, and some things very good in it, but the whole together, I thought, not so" (Diary of Samuel Pepys, 21 March 1667).

Cary died at the age of about 29 and was buried at Great Tew.

== Family ==
On 14 April 1653, Cary married Rachel Hungerford, daughter of Anthony Hungerford of Blackbourton Oxfordshire. They had one son Anthony Cary, 5th Viscount Falkland (1656–1694). Rachel Hungerford twice remarried, one of her husbands being Sir James Hayes (d.1694). She died at Bedgebury in Kent on 24 February 1718.

== Notes ==
Parliament of England
Preceded by John Downes	Member of Parliament for Arundel; 1660; With: The Earl of Orrery	Succeeded by The Earl of Orrery; John Trevor
Unknown	Member of Parliament for Oxford; 1660–1661; With: James Huxley	Succeeded by Richard Croke; Brome Whorwood
Honorary titles
English Interregnum	Lord Lieutenant of Oxfordshire; 1660–1663	Succeeded by The Earl of Clarendon
Preceded by The Earl of Berkshire	Custos Rotulorum of Oxfordshire; 1660–1663	Succeeded by Viscount Cornbury
Peerage of Scotland
Preceded by Lucius Cary	Viscount Falkland; 1649–1663	Succeeded by Anthony Cary
