= Custos Rotulorum of Oxfordshire =

This is a list of people who have served as Custos Rotulorum of Oxfordshire.

- William Fermor bef. 1544–1552
- John Williams, 1st Baron Williams of Thame bef. 1558–1559
- Sir Francis Knollys bef. 1562 – aft. 1584
- William Knollys, 1st Earl of Banbury bef. 1594–1632
- Thomas Howard, 1st Earl of Berkshire 1632–1646
- Interregnum
- Thomas Howard, 1st Earl of Berkshire 1660
- Henry Cary, 4th Viscount Falkland 1660–1663
- Henry Hyde, 2nd Earl of Clarendon 1663–1689
- James Bertie, 1st Earl of Abingdon 1689–1697

For later custodes rotulorum, see Lord Lieutenant of Oxfordshire.
