= John Hales (theologian) =

English cleric, theologian and writer

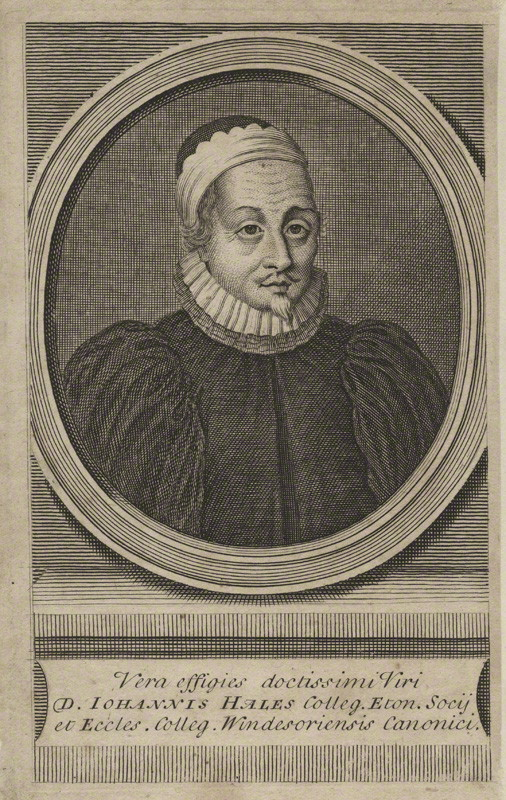
Line engraving from 1716 after an unknown artist.

John Hales (19 April 1584 – 19 May 1656) was an English cleric, theologian and writer. An eminent if modest author and critic, his posthumous works earned him the title of the "Ever-memorable".

== Early life ==
He was born in St. James' parish, Bath, on 19 April 1584. His father, John Hales, had an estate at Highchurch, near Bath, and was steward to the Horner family. After passing through the Bath grammar school, King Edwards, Hales went on 16 April 1597 as a scholar of Corpus Christi College, Oxford at the age of thirteen and graduated B.A. on 9 July 1603. He came to the notice of Sir Henry Savile, and was elected as a fellow of Merton College in 1605. He took orders; shone as a preacher, though not for his voice; and graduated M. A. on 20 June 1609. At Merton he distinguished himself as lecturer in Greek; he is said by Clarendon to have been largely responsible for Savile's edition of Chrysostom (1610–13). In 1612 he became public lecturer on Greek to the university. Next year he delivered (29 March) a funeral oration on Sir Thomas Bodley. Soon after (24 May) he was admitted fellow of Eton College, of which Savile was Provost. He was Regius Professor of Greek in 1615.

== Synod of Dort ==
In 1616 Hales went to the Netherlands as chaplain to the ambassador, Sir Dudley Carleton. Carleton sent him in 1618 to the Synod of Dort, as observer, and he remained there from 13 November till the following February. Then Walter Balcanquhall took over for him. Anthony Farindon states (as on Hales's own authority) that Hales departed from Calvinism when Simon Episcopius pressed the verse St. John iii. 16 to support his own doctrine. According to Hales's own letter (19 January 1619) it was Matthias Martinius of Bremen, who took a middle position, who employed this text. It is not clear that Hales became an Arminian, but in any case he came away less sectarian, and he was impressed by the debate on schism, which he reported on 1 December 1618.

== Later life ==
Hales then refused all offers of ecclesiastical preferment, choosing instead a scholarly retirement in a Fellowship of Eton College, of which his friends Sir Henry Savile and Sir Henry Wotton were successively Provost. He lived much among his books, visiting London only once a year, although he was possibly there more frequently during the period (1633–43) of Lucius Cary's connection with London.

In 1642, he was ejected from his stall as canon of Windsor by the parliamentary committee. He was not immediately turned out of his fellowship at Eton, but by 1644 both armies had battened onto the college rents. Hales hid himself for nine weeks in a private lodging in Eton, living on brown bread and beer at a cost of sixpence a week. On his refusal to take the engagement of 16 April 1649 he was formally dispossessed of his fellowship. Penwarden, who was put into his place, offered to share, but he declined. He went to Richings Lodge, near Colnbrook, Buckinghamshire, the residence of Anne Salter, second wife to Sir William Salter and sister to Brian Duppa, as tutor to her son William. To this house Henry King also retreated, with some members of his family, and they lived a sort of a collegiate life, with Hales acting as chaplain. After the order against harbouring malignants, he left Mrs. Salter against her wish, and lodged in Eton and was forced to sell his library. Some books were in Latin but most of his collection was in English. He sold them for seven hundred pounds, them having cost him two thousand five hundred pounds.

Hales died at Eton in the house of widow Dickenson, the wife of his servant in 19 May 1656 age 72.

== Biographers ==
His life was to have been written by Farindon; but Farindon died before the issue of the Golden Remains, to which his contribution is a letter to Garthwait the publisher. It is said that John Pearson was asked to take up Farindon's task; but he contented himself by prefixing to the Remains a few pages of eulogy. Farindon's materials passed to William Fulman, who likewise failed to write the memoir. Use has been made of Fulman's papers by John Walker and Chalmers.

John Aubrey, probably incorrectly, attributed to Hales the title "the first Socinian in England", an epithet he had earlier, equally incorrectly, previously given to Lucius Cary, 2nd Viscount Falkland.

== Works ==
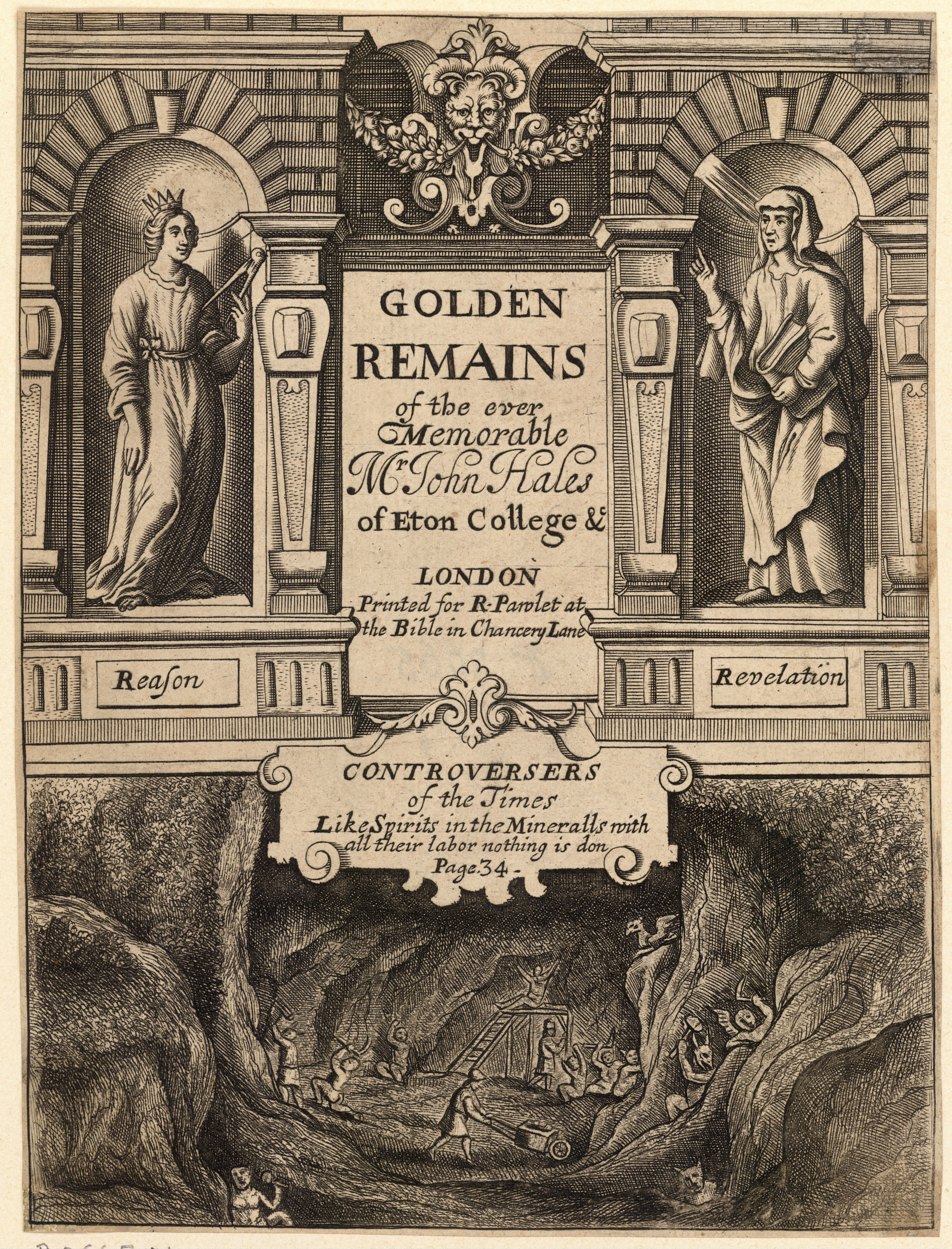
Golden Remains, etched by Wenceslaus Hollar

His reports to Carleton are included in his Golden Remains; an additional letter (11–22 December 1618) is given in Carleton's Letters (1757), and is in the 1765 edition of Hales's Works.

=== Main works ===
On the appearance (in 1628 and 1633) of two anonymous eirenic and Socinian tracts, he was commonly but inaccurately accredited with their authorship. Hales wrote little for publication. His works are:

- Oratio Funebris habita in Collegio Mertonensi . . . quo die . . . Thomse Bodleio funus ducebatur, &c., Oxford, 1613.
- A Sermon . . . concerning the Abuses of the obscure places of Holy Scripture, &c., Oxford, 1617.
- The sermon Of Dealing with Erring Christians, preached at St. Paul's Cross, seems also to have been printed, at Farindon's instigation.
- The sermon Of Duels, preached at the Hague, is said to have been printed, though Farindon implies the contrary.

=== Other works ===
Other pieces, published during his lifetime, but apparently without his authority, were:

- The Way towards the Finding of a Decision of the Chief Controversie now debated concerning Church Government, &c., 1641, anon.
- A Tract concerning Schisme and Schismatiques, ... by a learned and judicious divine, &c., 1642; two London editions, same year, also one at Oxford, with animadversions.
- Of the Blasphemie against the Holy Ghost, &c., 1646, anon.

=== Posthumous ===
- Golden Remains of the Ever Memorable Mr. John Hales, &c., 1659; 2nd edit., with additions, 1673; 3rd edit.
- Sermons preached at Eton, &c.
- Several Tracts, &c., 1677; 2nd edit., 1716, with addition of the letter to Laud.

The Works . . . now first collected, &c., were edited by Sir David Dalrymple, Lord Hailes, and printed at Glasgow by Foulis, 1765, in 3 vols.

Note:The eirenic tract on Schism and Schismatiques may have been written about 1636. Hales describes it as 'a letter,' and 'for the use of a private friend,' probably William Chillingworth, then working on his Religion of Protestants (1637). Those two works, with the Discourse of Infallibility (1645) of Lucius Cary, 2nd Viscount Falkland, have been identified as key texts of the Great Tew Circle to which Hales belonged.

It was circulated in manuscript, and a copy fell into the hands of William Laud. Hearing that the paper had given offence to the archbishop, Hales wrote, and Laud interviewed him. Des Maizeaux mentions the story that Hales assisted Laud in the second edition (1639) of his Conference with John Percy. Laud made him one of his chaplains, and obtained for him a canonry at Windsor, into which he was installed on 27 June 1639.
