= William Chillingworth =

English churchman (1602-1644)

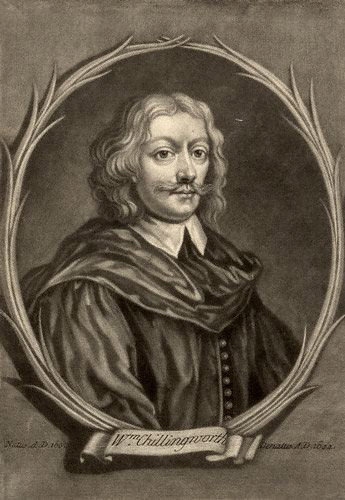
William Chillingworth, 18th-century engraving by Francis Kyte

William Chillingworth (12 October 1602 – 30 January 1644) was a controversial English churchman.

== Early life ==
He was born in Oxford, where his father served as mayor; William Laud was his godfather. In June 1618 he became a scholar of Trinity College, Oxford, of which he was made a fellow in June 1628. He gained a reputation as a skilful debater, excelled in mathematics, and also became known as a poet. He associated with Sir Lucius Cary, John Hales, and Gilbert Sheldon.

Interested in religious controversy and not yet in orders, Chillingworth took on the Jesuit John Percy (alias "John Fisher"). Percy succeeded in converting Chillingworth, and persuaded him to go to the Jesuit college at Douai, in 1630. There he wrote an account of his reasons for leaving Protestantism, but kept in touch with Laud. In 1631, however, he thought again, and left Douai. He did not immediately return to the orthodox positions of the Church of England, but was drawn into controversy with Catholics including John Floyd, and in a disputation with Thomas White before Lord Digby and Sir Kenelm Digby.

== Theology ==
He was substantially influenced by Pyrrhonism, and said to "have delighted in Sextus Empiricus." His theology was a kind of probabilism based on an ultimate Pyrrhonism.

His theological sensitiveness appears in his refusal of a preferment offered to him in 1635 by Sir Thomas Coventry, Lord Keeper of the Great Seal. He was in difficulty about subscribing the Thirty-Nine Articles. As he informed Gilbert Sheldon, then Warden of All Souls College, Oxford, in a letter, he was fully resolved on two points: that to say that the Fourth Commandment is a law of God appertaining to Christians is false and unlawful, and that the damnatory clauses in the Athanasian Creed are false, presumptuous and schismatical. To subscribe, therefore, he felt would be to "subscribe his own damnation". Chillingworth also adopted Arminian views.

== The Religion of Protestants ==
His major work was an intervention in another controversy, undertaken in defence of Christopher Potter, Provost of The Queen's College, Oxford, against the Jesuit Edward Knott. Potter had replied in 1633 to Knott's Charity Mistaken (1630), and Knott retaliated with Mercy and Truth, which Chillingworth attempted to answer. Knott brought out a preemptive pamphlet tending to show that Chillingworth was a Socinian. Chillingworth wrote The Religion of Protestants while staying at Great Tew, owned by Lucius Cary, 2nd Viscount Falkland. Laud, now Archbishop of Canterbury, was anxious about Chillingworth's reply to Knott; at his request it was examined by Richard Baily, John Prideaux, and Samuel Fell, and published with their approval in 1637, with the title The Religion of Protestants a Safe Way to Salvation.

The main argument is a vindication of the sole authority of the Bible in spiritual matters, and of the free right of the individual conscience to interpret it. In the preface Chillingworth expresses his new view about subscription to the articles. "For the Church of England," he there says, "I am persuaded that the constant doctrine of it is so pure and orthodox, that whosoever believes it, and lives according to it, undoubtedly he shall be saved, and that there is no error in it which may necessitate or warrant any man to disturb the peace or renounce the communion of it. This, in my opinion, is all intended by subscription."

== Later life ==
In the following year (1638), he was promoted to the chancellorship of the church of Sarum, with the prebend of Brixworth annexed to it. In the First English Civil War, he wrote a criticism of the Scots, and was in the king's army at the siege of Gloucester, suggesting a testudo for assaulting the town. Shortly afterwards he accompanied Ralph Hopton, general of the king's troops in the west, in his march; and, being taken ill at Arundel Castle, he was captured by the parliamentary forces under Sir William Waller. As he was unable to go to London with the garrison, he was conveyed to Chichester, where he died. His last days were harassed by the diatribes of the Puritan preacher, Francis Cheynell. Gerald Aylmer thought the subject was "remarkably ineffective" as an anti-Puritan spokesman and that he died "virtually a martyr" for the established church.

== Works ==
Besides his principal work, Chillingworth wrote a number of smaller anti-Jesuit papers published in the posthumous Additional Discourses (1687), and nine of his sermons have been preserved. He was a zealous Royalist, asserting that even the unjust and tyrannous violence of princes may not be resisted, although it might be avoided in terms of the instruction, "when they persecute you in one city, flee into another."

His writings enjoyed a high popularity, particularly towards the end of the 17th century, after a popular, condensed edition of The Religion of Protestants appeared in 1687, edited by John Patrick. The Religion of Protestants is acutely argued, and was commended by John Locke. The charge of Socinianism was frequently brought against Chillingworth, but, as John Tillotson thought, "for no other cause but his worthy and successful attempts to make the Christian religion reasonable." The gist of his argument is expressed in a single sentence:

"I am fully assured that God does not, and therefore that men ought not to, require any more of any man than this, to believe the Scripture to be God's word, and to endeavour to find the true sense of it, and to live according to it."

In this way he bypassed the debate on the fundamental articles, a bone of contention between the Catholic and Protestant approaches.

A Life by Thomas Birch was prefixed to the 1742 edition of Chillingworth's Works.

== See also ==
- Great Tew Circle

== Sources ==
- Lueker, Erwin Louis (2000b). "Arminianism". Christian Cyclopedia. Saint Louis, MO: Concordia publ. House.
- Lueker, Erwin Louis (2000). "Chillingworth, William". Christian Cyclopedia. Saint Louis, MO: Concordia publ. House.

Attribution:

- This article incorporates text from a publication now in the public domain: "Chillingworth, William". Dictionary of National Biography. London: Smith, Elder & Co. 1885–1900.
