= Gafford =

Gafford is a surname. Notable people with the surname include:

- Alice Taylor Gafford (1886–1981), American nurse, teacher, and artist
- Carl Gafford (born 1953), American comics artist
- Daniel Gafford (born 1998), American basketball player
- Monk Gafford (1920–1987), American football player
- Ray Gafford (1914–1990), American golfer
- Rico Gafford (born 1996), American football player
- Thomas Gafford (born 1983), American football player

== See also ==
- Gafford, Texas, an unincorporated community in Hopkins County, Texas
