= Lionel Gatford (priest, died 1665) =

Lionel Gatford (died 1665) was a royalist Church of England clergyman.

== Life ==
Born in Sussex to unknown parents, Lionel Gatford entered Jesus College, Cambridge in 1618, graduating B.A. in 1621–2. In 1625 he proceeded M.A. and became a fellow of Jesus. He was ordained deacon at Peterborough on 24 December 1626, and was elected junior university proctor in 1631–2. In 1633 he proceeded B.D. and became vicar of St Clement's Church, Cambridge. Disturbed by the theological views of Eleazar Duncon's 1633 DD commencement, which recommended bowing at the altar and suggested that "good works are efficaciously necessary to salvation", Gatford wrote a long letter on the subject to Lord Goring. Resigning his Jesus fellowship in 1638, he was presented by another patron, Sir John Rous, to the rectory of Dennington, Suffolk in 1641.

Soon after the outbreak of the English Civil War, Gatford retired to Cambridge in order to write a pamphlet setting forth the doctrine of the church in regard to the obedience due to kings. On the night of 26 January 1642–3 Oliver Cromwell seized his manuscript, then in the press at Cambridge, arrested Gatford in his bed at Jesus College, and sent both author and copy to London. On 30 January the Commons ordered him to be imprisoned in Ely House, Holborn. Nothing daunted he contrived to publish in the following March a vigorous onslaught on anabaptists and other Puritans, called An Exhortation to Peace. This was ordered by the Commons on 3 July to be referred to the consideration of the committee for Cambridge. After seventeen months' confinement Gatford was freed in an exchange of prisoners.

Banned from returning to Dennington or resuming work as a clergyman elsewhere, Gatford went to the royalist headquarters at Oxford, where he lived with the mayor, Thomas Smith. There he wrote a whimsical tract on the spiritual and bodily causes and effects of the plague raging in Oxford, Λόγος Ἀλεξιφάρμακος or Hyperphysicall Directions in Time of Plague (1644). Gatford soon after went to Cornwall as chaplain of Pendennis Castle. About July 1645 he drafted an address "to the valiant and loyal Cornish men", urging them to rise up in support of the royal cause. He was taken prisoner when Pendennis Castle surrendered in August 1646, and by 1647 he was exiled with the royalists in Jersey, becoming there a favourite of Sir Edward Hyde, who made him his chaplain. His next publication was A Faithfull and Faire Warning, reissued as Englands Complaint (1648): Gatford called upon "Inhabitants of the county of Suffolk" to help the royalist garrison at Colchester holding out against the New Model Army, and expressed fears that parliament would grant toleration to Catholics, who would consequently return to power.

Gatford appears to have remained in exile about seven years. After his return he supported himself by taking boarders, living at different times at Kenninghall Place, Sanden House, Kilborough, and Swaffham in Norfolk. From there he moved to Hackney, Middlesex, afterwards to Well Hall, Kent, and finally to Walham Green. Pursued by the county committees for persisting in keeping up the traditional Church of England service, he protested in A Petition for the Vindication of the Publique use of the Book of Common Prayer (1655), prefixed by a spirited letter to the parliament. Publick Good without Private Interest appeared in 1657.

At the Restoration Gatford was created Doctor of Divinity by royal mandate. He found the chancel and parsonage-house of Dennington in ruins, and, as he could not afford to have them rebuilt, petitioned the king for the vicarage of St Andrew's Church, Plymouth in Devon, to which he was presented on 20 August 1661. Gatford's last literary labour was to defend his old patron, Sir John Rous, from puritan allegations of drunkenness in A true and faithfull Narrative of the … death of Mr. William Tyrrell (1661). In August 1662 Dr. George, the nonconformist vicar of Plymouth, was ejected, but the corporation elected Roger Ashton as his successor. In 1663 the right of appointing to the incumbency of Great Yarmouth was disputed between the corporation of the town and the dean and chapter of Norwich. Gatford, on the recommendation of Edward Hyde, now Earl of Clarendon and high steward of the borough, was accepted by the corporation, and allowed "to officiate as curate during the pleasure of the House."

Gatford died of the plague in 1665, and the corporation presented his widow Dorcas with £100 in consideration of the "pains he had taken in serving the cure for two years". His son, Lionel Gatford, D.D., contributed a highly coloured account of his parents' sufferings during the civil war to John Walker's Sufferings of the Clergy. Gatford has a Greek distich in Ralph Winterton's Hippocratis Aphorismi.

== Works ==
- An Exhortation to Peace: with an Intimation of the prime Enemies thereof, lately delivered in a Sermon [on Psalm cxxii. 6], and newly published with some small Addition, 4to, London, 1643.
- Λόγος Ἀλεξιφάρμακος [Logos alexipharmakos] or Hyperphysicall Directions in Time of Plague. Collected out of the sole authentick Dispensatory of the chief Physitian both of Soule and Body, and disposed more particularly, though not without some alteration and addition, according to the method of those Physicall Directions printed by Command of the Lords of the Councell at Oxford, 1644 and very requisite to be used with them: also, certain aphorismes, premised, and conclusions from them deduced, concerning the plague, necesiary to be knovvn and observed of all, that would either prevent it, or get it cured Li, &c. 4to, Oxford, 1644.
- A Faithfull and Faire Warning: humbly presented to the knights, gentlemen, clergie-men, yeomen, and other the inhabitants of the county of Suffolke ..., London: Printed for John Gyles, 1648.
- Englands Complaint: or a sharp Reproof for the Inhabitants thereof; against that now reigning Sin of Rebellion; but more especially to the Inhabitants of the County of Suffolk. With a Vindication of those Worthyes now in Colchester, 4to, London, 1648.
- A Petition for the Vindication of the Publique use of the Book of Common Prayer from some foul … aspersions lately cast upon it. … Occasioned by the late Ordinance for the ejecting of scandalous … Ministers …, London, 1655.
- Publick Good Without Private Interest: or ... the Present Sad State and Condition of the English Colonie in Virginea, London, 1657
- To the most reverend, the arch-bishops, and bishops, the reverend deans, arch deacons, and the rest of the learned and much honoured convocation now assembled at Westminster ... the humble remonstrance and petition of Lionel Gatford, D.D. and chaplin to His Sacred Majesty, in the behalf of their and his fellow-sufferers, that are ready to starve and perish for want of subsistance, 1661
- A true and faithful narrative of the much to be lamented death of Mr. William Tyrrell and the more to be magnified preservation of Sr. John Rous of Henham, Baronet, and divers other gentlemen ... published for the vindication of Gods truth and those persons honour and credit, from some foul and scandalous aspersions cast upon them in alying libell entituled, Sad and lamentable news from Suffolk, 1661
