= Great Tew =

Village in Oxfordshire, England

Coordinates: 51.963°N 1.435°W

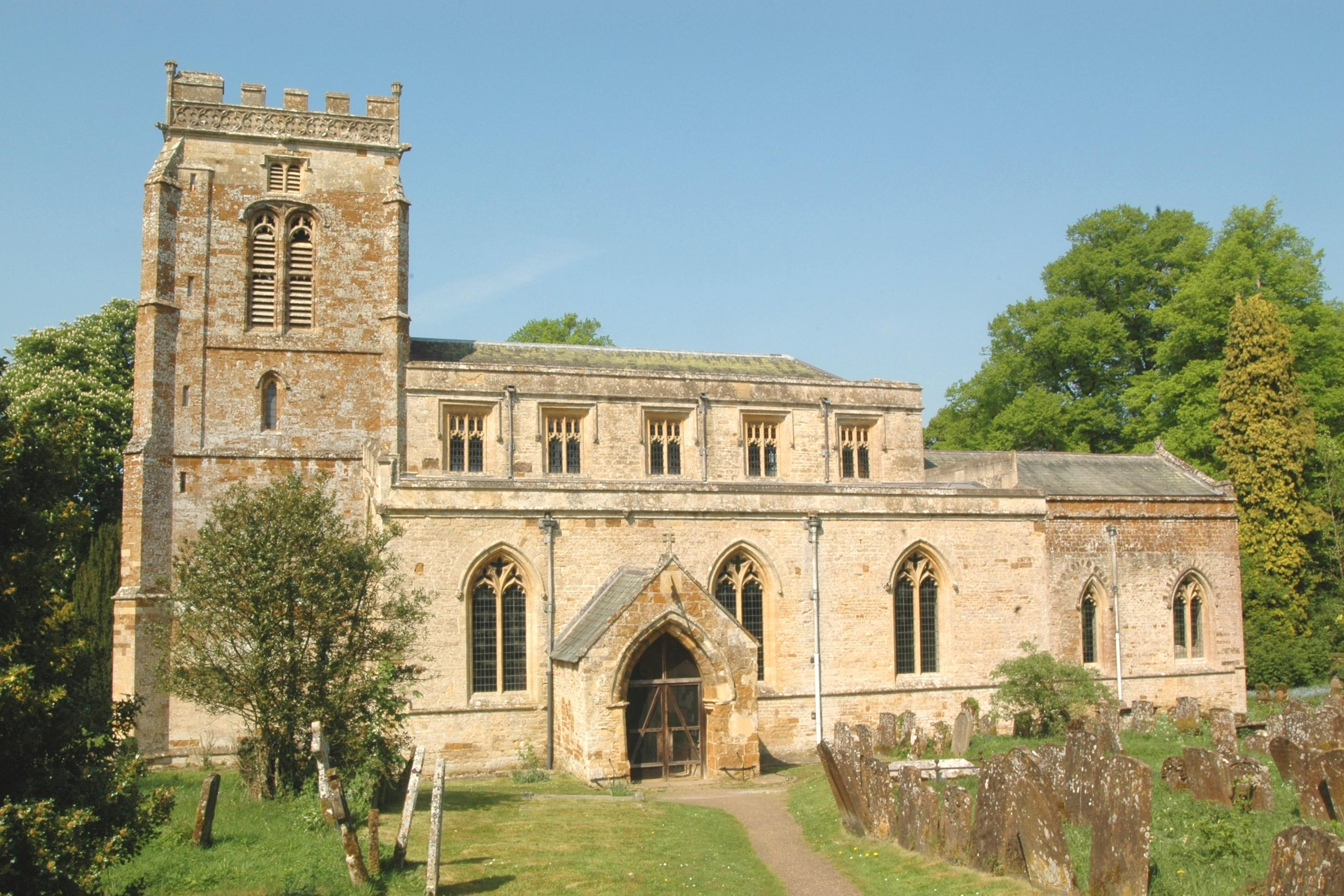
- St Michael & All Angels' parish church

- Location within Oxfordshire
- Population: 156 (2011 census)
- OS grid reference: SP3929
- Civil parish: Great Tew
- District: West Oxfordshire
- Shire county: Oxfordshire
- Region: South East
- Country: England
- Sovereign state: United Kingdom
- Post town: Chipping Norton
- Postcode district: OX7
- Dialling code: 01608
- Police: Thames Valley
- Fire: Oxfordshire
- Ambulance: South Central
- UK Parliament: Banbury
- Website: Great Tew

Great Tew is an English village and civil parish in Oxfordshire, about 5 miles (8 km) north-east of Chipping Norton and 8 miles (13 km) south-west of Banbury, close to the Cotswold Hills. The 2011 census gave a parish population of 156. This qualifies it for an annual parish meeting, not a monthly parish council. The village has largely belonged since the 1980s to the Johnston family, as the Great Tew Estate, with renovations and improvements.

== Name ==
In Old English, the toponym Cyrictiwa – "Church Tew" – distinguishes the village from neighbouring Little Tew, which then lacked a church, and Nether Worton which seems not to have had a place of worship until the 12th century. In the 17th century, some Raynsford family genealogical records mention the village as "Tew Magna".

== History ==
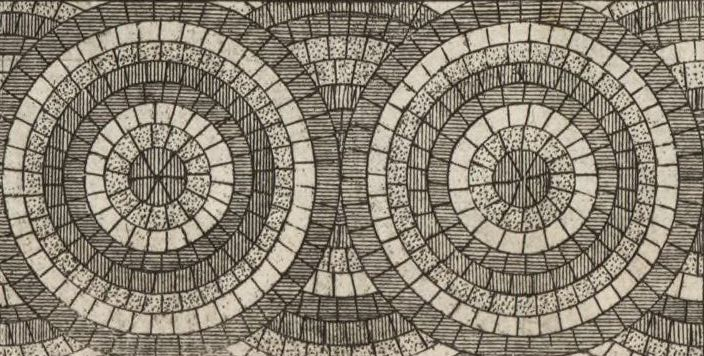
Herman Moll's 1724 engraving of the Roman mosaic at the Beaconsfield villa

=== Antiquity ===
Evidence that the area has been inhabited since at least the Bronze Age includes a barrow about 1 mile (1.6 km) south of the village. Under Roman rule, a villa connected to a road was located 1.5 miles (2.4 km) southeast of the village at what is now Beaconsfield Farm. The villa was rediscovered in the 17th century and excavations have subsequently revealed a hypocaust and mosaic floors, pottery from the 3rd and 4th centuries, and some evidence that Roman occupation may have begun early in the 2nd century.

=== Middle Ages ===
The main settlement moved to its present location in the Anglo-Saxon era. Ælfric of Abingdon held the manor of Great Tew by 990 and became Archbishop of Canterbury in 995. Ælfric died in 1005, leaving Great Tew to Saint Alban's Abbey. In 1049–1052 the abbey leased Great Tew:

Leofstan, abbot, and St Albans Abbey, to Tova, widow of Wihtric, in return for 3 marks of gold and an annual render of honey; lease, for her lifetime and that of her son, Godwine, of land at Cyrictiwa, with reversion to St Albans.

William the Conqueror granted the manor to his half-brother Odo, Bishop of Bayeux. It was recorded among Odo's estates in the Domesday Book in 1086.

=== Modernity ===
Tew Great Park was created before the latter part of the 16th century. Sir Lawrence Tanfield, Lord Chief Baron of the Exchequer, bought Great Tew estate in 1611 from Edward Rainsford. He deprived the villagers of timber, causing some cottages to fall into disrepair. Tanfield enclosed part of Great Tew's lands in 1622. However, most of the parish's common lands remained unenclosed until an enclosure act for Great Tew was passed in 1767. After Tanfield died in 1626, followed by his wife Elizabeth in 1629, Great Tew passed to his young grandson Lucius Cary, 2nd Viscount Falkland. In the 1630s Lucius gathered together a Great Tew circle of writers and scholars, who included Abraham Cowley, Ben Jonson and Edmund Waller. During the English Civil War the young Viscount fought on the Royalist side and was killed in 1643 at the First Battle of Newbury. Great Tew remained in the Cary family until the death of Anthony Cary, 5th Viscount of Falkland in 1694.

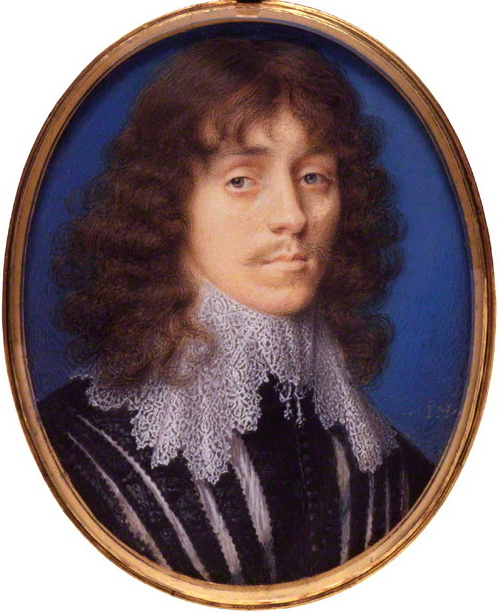
Miniature of Lucius Cary, 2nd Viscount Falkland

Viscount Cary lived in a large manor house that seems to have been built in or before the early 17th century and extended in the latter part. In 1736 the political manager Susanna Keck married Anthony Keck MP who had inherited the manor. It was demolished in about 1800, but surviving adjacent structures from about 1700 include stables, a dovecote and a stone gate piers.

In 1780 and 1793 Great Tew estate was bought by George Stratton, who had made a fortune in the East India Company. He died in March 1800 and was succeeded by his son George Frederick Stratton. The manor house had evidently fallen into disrepair, as the Strattons lived in a smaller Georgian dower house slightly to the south of it, and had the manor house demolished in about 1803. In 1808 George Frederick Stratton engaged the Scots botanist and garden designer John Loudon, who laid out north and south drives in Great Tew Park and planted ornamental trees in and around the village, which still enhance its appearance.

In 1815–1816, Matthew Robinson Boulton, son of the manufacturer Matthew Boulton of Soho, Birmingham, bought the estate. In 1834 he added a Gothic Revival library to the east end of the house, and in 1856 his family added to the west end a Tudor style section designed by F.S. Waller. Great Tew stayed with the family until M. E. Boulton died without heirs in 1914. In 2014, the house seemed unoccupied and clad in scaffolding and plastic sheeting, as a restoration project for the owners, the Johnston family, who reopened the local ironstone quarry in 2000. Rupert Murdoch and Jerry Hall acquired the manor in 2020; the building was "in a derelict condition" but the couple planned a restoration to include a domed roof. In recent years the Great Tew Estate has hosted events through the year, including the Cornbury Music Festival.

== Parish church ==
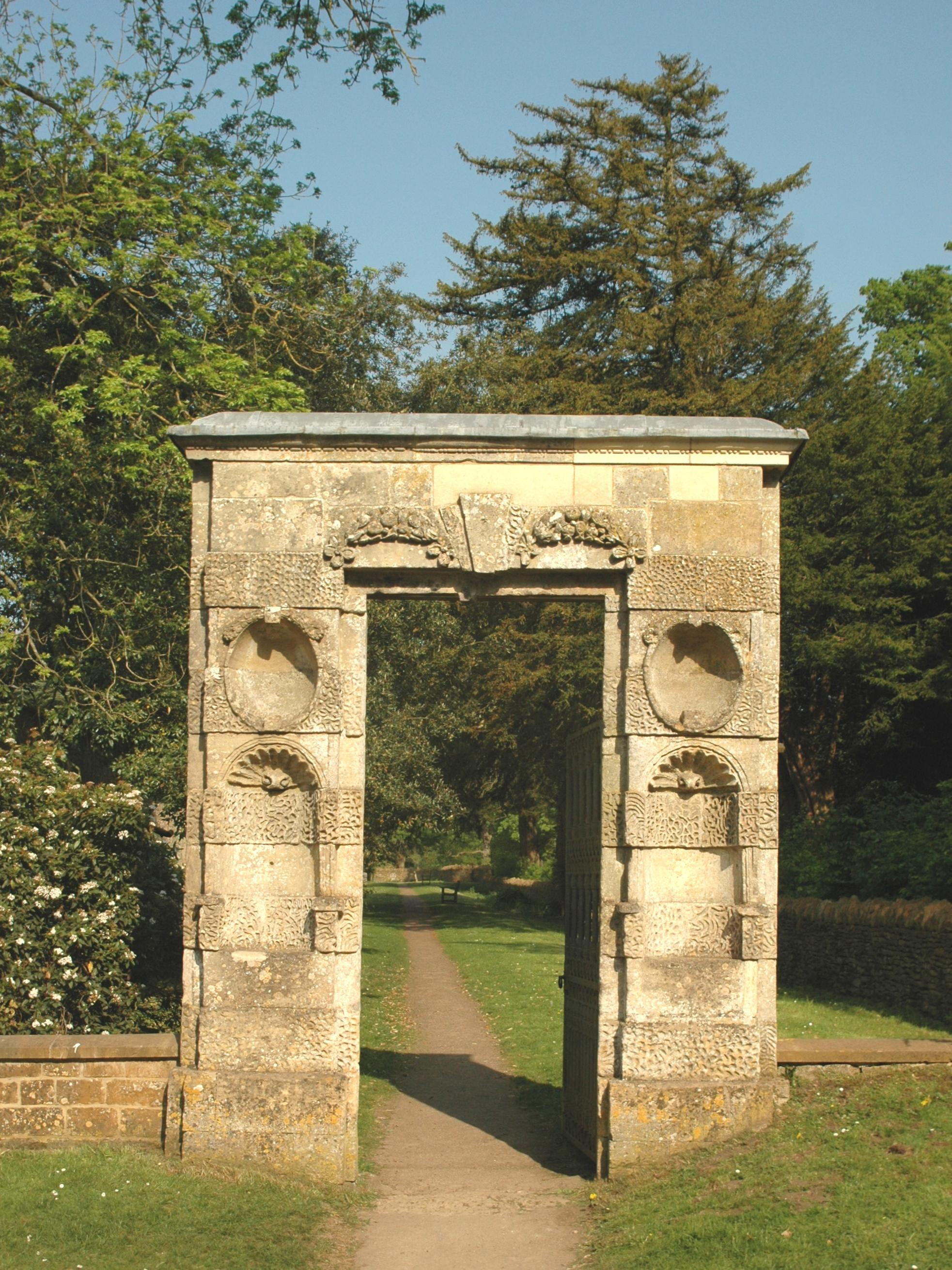
17th-century gateway leading to St Michael's parish church

The Church of England parish church of St Michael and all Angels was originally Norman. The south doorway of about 1170 survives. Rebuilding ensued in the 13th century; the arcades of stone pillars inside and the south porch survive from that period. Early in the 14th century the aisles were enlarged and most of today's windows installed. The bell tower was built late in the 14th century in a transitional style between Decorated Gothic and Perpendicular. Next the Perpendicular Gothic clerestory was added. The architect Thomas Rickman repaired the church and restored its chancel in 1826–1827. The chancel has a monument to Mary Anne Boulton, which includes a reclining female figure sculpted in white marble by Francis Chantrey in 1834. The church is a Grade I listed building.

The tower has a ring of eight bells. Six were cast in 1709 by Abraham I Rudhall of Gloucester. A seventh was cast in 1785 by Abraham's grandsons Charles and John Rudhall, also of Gloucester. The newest bell was cast in 1842 by W & J Taylor, presumably at their foundry in Oxford. The organ by Henry Williams of Cheltenham is a fine example dating from about 1863, the work of a maker who as foreman of Gray and Davison in London had been involved in building the organ for the Great Exhibition of 1851, now in St Anne's, Limehouse. The living of St Michael's was granted to the Benedictine Godstow Abbey in 1302 and remained under it until the abbey was suppressed in the dissolution of the monasteries in 1539. The villages of Nether Worton and Little Tew were part of the Great Tew church parish. Nether Worton became separate again in the 17th century and Little Tew in the 1850s. Great and Little Tew were reunited as a single Church of England benefice in 1930.

A further manor, called "Purceles Maner" in Great Tew, in mentioned in 1452, held by Thomas Purcell.

== Economic and social history ==
=== Mills ===
Great Tew is said to have had two watermills by the 13th century. Both were still in use when the estate was surveyed in 1778. Mill Lane, about 600 yards (550 m) north of the village, is named after a mill built or rebuilt in the 17th century for wool processing. Traces of its mill pond, mill stream and wheel chamber were still visible in the early 1980s. About 1 mile (1.6 km) north of the village, there was a mill on the stream near Cottenham Farm. Traces of its mill ponds, buildings and two water wheels were still visible in the early 1980s, and a small wood there is still called Pool Spinney. One mill had ceased to be used by the time G. F. Stratton sold the estate in 1815; the other was disused by 1837.

One of J. C. Loudon's works for G. F. Stratton after 1808 was an elaborate watermill at Tracey Farm in the south of the parish. It was a bone mill, because the British Agricultural Revolution had identified lime as a fertiliser and bone meal as a source of it. The stream at Tracey Farm was dammed in a mill pond, and both the leat feeding the water wheel and the tail race downstream of it were in brick-lined tunnels, the latter 20 feet (6 m) below ground. While most Oxfordshire watermills have an undershot or a breastshot wheel, Loudon adopted a more efficient backshot wheel made of wood and iron and 16 feet (5 m) in diameter. A sawmill powered by a beam engine was built in the middle of the 19th century. The beam engine has gone but the engine house and its tall chimney survive.

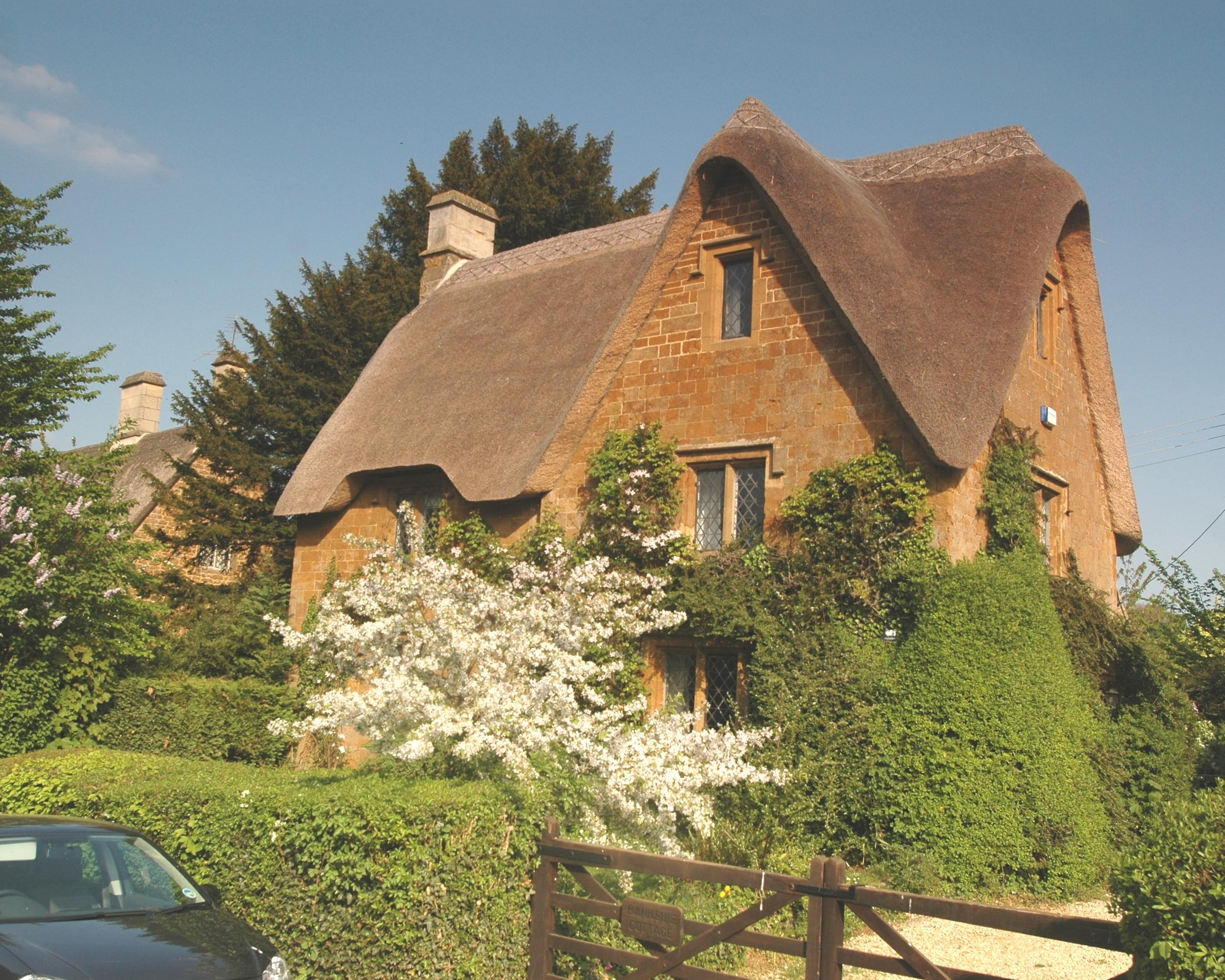
One of the thatched cottages in Brook Road

=== Cottages ===
Many dwellings in the village seem to have been built in the 17th century during the Great Rebuilding of England. Given the Tanfields' behaviour towards the villagers, they are more likely to have been built in the decades when the Cary family had the estate. Every cottage and house is built of local ironstone from Great Tew's quarry, and most have thatched roofs. Matthew Robinson Boulton had most of the village's old cottages and houses rebuilt and embellished from 1819 onwards.

After M. E. Boulton's death in 1914 Great Tew estate was held in public trusteeship for nearly 50 years, during which time many of its historic cottages and houses were unoccupied and allowed to become derelict. In 1962 Major Eustace Robb, only son of Major-General Sir Frederick Spencer Robb, inherited the estate and declared he would restore its prosperity and buildings. However, a decade later many cottages were continuing to decay and Jennifer Sherwood and Sir Nikolaus Pevsner condemned this as "one of the most depressing sights in the whole county. Terraces of cottages lie derelict (1972) and will soon be beyond hope of restoration. A scheme of gradual rehabilitation is said to be in progress, but nothing has been done meanwhile to prevent the decay of unused cottages, some of which are completely ruinous and will need to be entirely rebuilt."

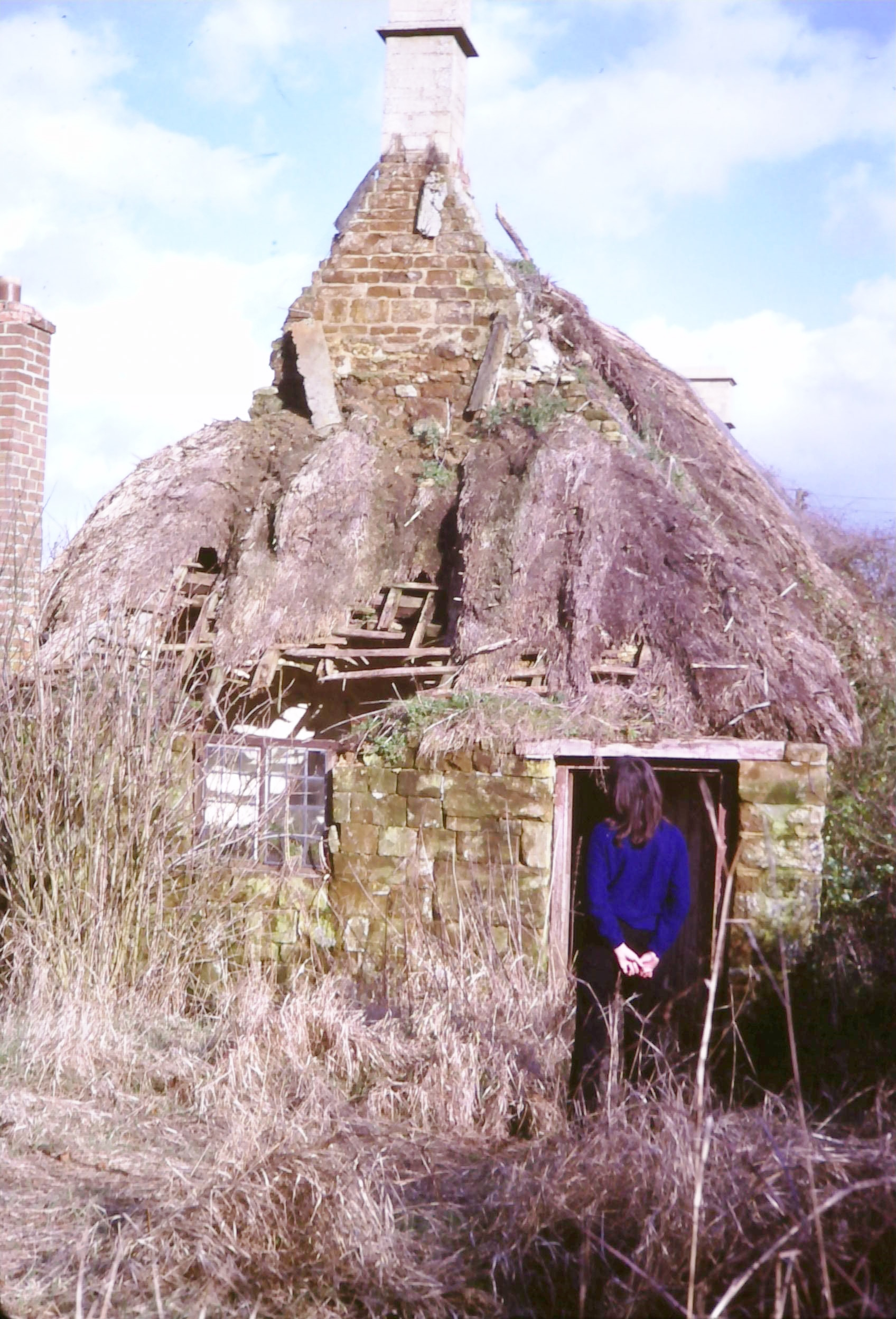
A cottage standing derelict in 1980

In 1978 another authority described Major Robb's treatment of Great Tew as a "notorious example" that "demonstrated that a single-minded or neglectful owner can still cause both the community and the village fabric to die." Also in 1978, Great Tew village was declared a conservation area. In 1985 Major Robb died, leaving Great Tew estate to the Johnston family, who have worked on restoration. In 2000 they reopened Great Tew's quarry to supply ironstone for building. Many of the cottages are Grade II listed buildings. One pair of 17th-century cottages, 57 and 58 The Lane, are Grade II* listed.

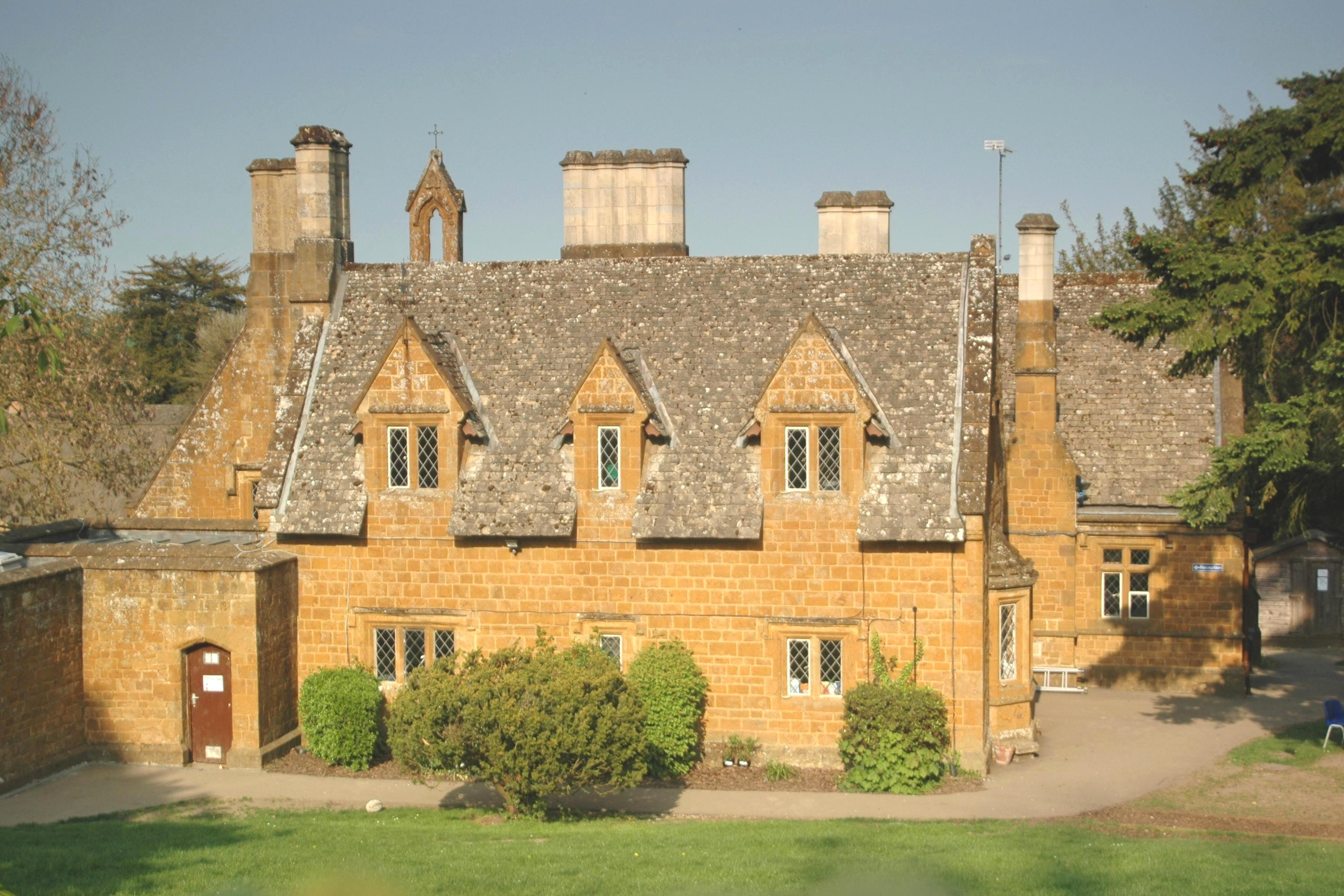
Great Tew County Primary School, built in 1852

Great Tew has 87 Grade II listed buildings.

=== School ===
In the 17th century, Lettice Cary, wife of the 2nd Viscount Falkland, cared for the poor and sick of Great Tew and founded a village school. The village still had a school in the 18th century, but a schoolroom attached to the church was disused by 1738 and demolished later in that century. A school had been re-established by 1774; its building was enlarged in 1815. In 1818, the village also had two dame schools. In 1852 M. R. Boulton moved the primary school to a new building on the village green. In 1923 this was enlarged to take extra pupils from Little Tew. It has three classrooms for pupils in classes of mixed age and ability. It is a county primary school run by Oxfordshire County Council.

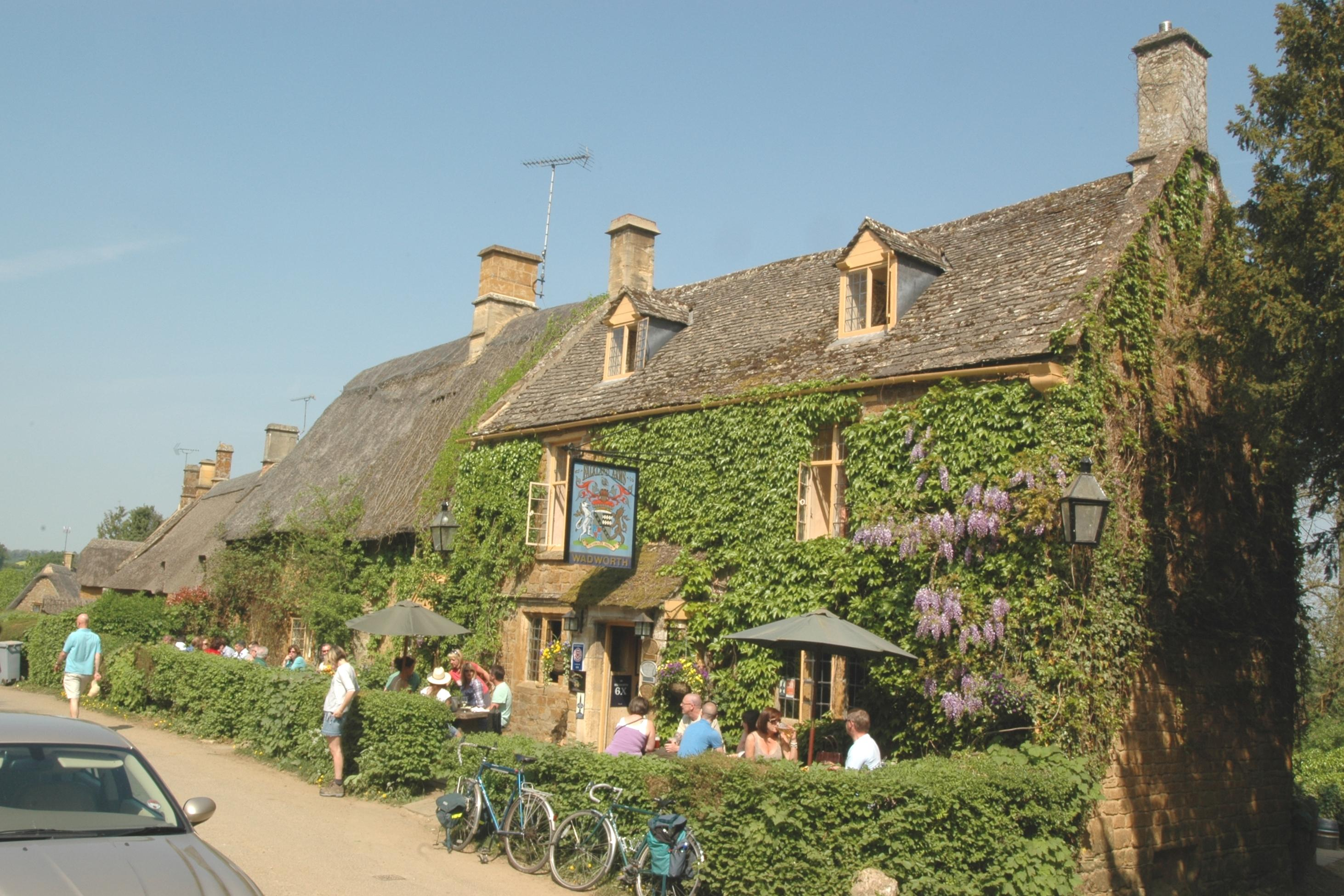
The Falkland Arms public house

== Amenities ==
The Falkland Arms is mostly a late 17th-century public house, in part possibly earlier. It had acquired its current name by 1830 and is now held by Wadworth Brewery. It offers accommodation, food and real ale, and is listed in a Michelin Guide. Great Tew has a general store-cum-café, which was once also the sub-post office. The Tew Centre between the village and Little Tew, also has a café. Great and Little Tew Cricket Club is based there. Just outside the village, on the site of the former Tracey Farm is the Soho Farmhouse member's club Soho House (club). The Soho Farmhouse is noted as one of the area's most fashionable destinations and a celebrity destination.

== Notable people ==
- David and Victoria Beckham
- Jack Savoretti

== Sources ==
- Case, H.J.; Kirk, J.R. (1951). "Archaeological Notes 1951" (PDF). Oxoniensia. XVI. Oxford Architectural and Historical Society: 80.
- Baggs, A.P.; Colvin, Christina; Colvin, H.M.; Cooper, Janet; Day, C.J.; Selwyn, Nesta; Tomkinson, A. (1983). "Great Tew". In Crossley, Alan (ed.). A History of the County of Oxford. Victoria County History. Vol. 11: Wootton Hundred (northern part). pp. 223–247.
- Emery, Frank (1974). The Oxfordshire Landscape. The Making of the English Landscape. London: Hodder & Stoughton. pp. 70, 130, 138–140, 220. ISBN 0-340-04301-6.
- Foreman, Wilfrid (1983). Oxfordshire Mills. Chichester: Phillimore & Co Ltd. pp. 67, 70, 108. ISBN 0-85033-441-1.
- Gray, Howard L (1959) [1915]. The English Field Systems. Cambridge, MA; London: Harvard University Press; Merlin Press. pp. 128–130.
- Loudon, J.C. (1812). Observations on laying out Farms in the Scotch style adapted to England.
- Rowley, Trevor (1978). Villages in the Landscape. Archaeology in the Field Series. London: J.M. Dent & Sons Ltd. p. 32. ISBN 0-460-04166-5.
- Sherwood, Jennifer; Pevsner, Nikolaus (1974). Oxfordshire. The Buildings of England. Harmondsworth: Penguin Books. pp. 624–628. ISBN 0-14-071045-0.
