= Eleazar Duncon =

English Royalist divine

Eleazar Duncon (died 1660) was an English Royalist divine.

== Biography ==
Duncon probably matriculated at Queens' College, Cambridge; but took his B.A. degree as a member of Caius College, and was then elected Fellow of Pembroke Hall in 1618. On 13 March 1624–5, being M. A., he was ordained deacon by William Laud, then bishop of St. David's, receiving priest's orders from Richard Neile, at that time bishop of Durham, on 24 September 1626. Neile made him his chaplain, and gave him several valuable preferments.

In January 1628, being then B.D., he was collated to the fifth stall in the church of Durham, obtaining the twelfth stall at Winchester 13 November 1629. On 10 April 1633, having taken his doctor's degree in the previous March, he became rector of St Andrew's Church, Haughton-le-Skerne, Durham. He resigned his stall at Winchester, 24 April 1640, to succeed to the prebend of Knaresborough-cum-Brickhill in York Minster on the following 1 May. He was also chaplain to the king.

Duncon, who was one of the most learned as well as ablest promoters of Laud's high church policy, was stripped of all his preferments by the parliament, and retired to the continent. In 1651 he was in attendance upon the English court in France, and officiated with other exiled clergymen in Sir Richard Browne's chapel at Paris. During the same year he went to Italy, but in November 1655 he was living at Saumur, busied with a scheme of consecrating bishops. On 28 August 1659 John Cosin, writing from Paris to William Sancroft, says of Duncon, "now all his employment is to make sermons before the English merchants at Ligorne and Florence". According to his friend, Dr. Richard Watson, Duncon died at Leghorn in 1660; in Barnabas Oley's preface to George Herbert's A Priest to the Temple he and his brother, John Duncon, are mentioned as having "died before the miracle of our happy restauration".

== Works ==
His only known work, De Adoratione Dei versus Altare, his determination for the degree of D.D., 15 March 1633, appears to have been published soon after that date. The arguments were answered in a tract entitled Superstitio Superste. It was reprinted after the author's death by R. Watson, (Cambridge?), 1660, an English version, by I. D., appearing a few months later, London (1661). A reply by Zachary Crofton entitled Altar Worship, London, 1661, gave little ground to the Puritan view; a tirade by Daniel Cawdry, Bowing towards the Altar ... impleaded as grossely Superstitious, London, 1661, came out shortly afterwards. Two of Duncon's letters to John Cosin dated 1637 and 1638 are in the British Library (Add MS 4275, ff. 197 & 198).

== Family ==
John Duncon, brother of Eleazar, was, as he says, holding a cure in Essex at the time of the civil war. After his deprivation he was received into the house of Lady Falkland (widow of Lucius Cary, 2nd Viscount Falkland). He is author of a quaint and once popular religious biography, The Returnes of Spiritual Comfort and Grief in a devout Soul. Represented (by entercourse of Letters) to the Right Honourable the Lady Letice, Vi-Countess Falkland, in her Life time. And exemplified in the holy Life and Death of the said Honorable Lady (without author's name). It was published in London in 1648, 1649 and 1653. It has since been republished several times including a 1908 edition: Howard, M. F., ed. (1908). Lady Lettice, vi-countess Falkland...

Another brother, Edmund Duncon, was a puritan who was sent by Nicholas Ferrar of Little Gidding, near Huntingdon, to visit George Herbert during his last illness. Herbert placed the manuscript of A Priest to the Temple in his hands, with an injunction to deliver it to Ferrar. Duncon afterwards became possessed of it, and promoted its publication. He also gave some slight assistance to Walton when writing his life of Herbert. On 23 May 1663 he was instituted to the rectory of Friern Barnet, Middlesex. He died in 1673.
