= Lionel Gatford (priest, died 1715) =

English Anglican priest

Lionel Gatford D.D. was an English Anglican priest in the 17th century.

The son of Lionel Gatford, he received his education at Jesus College, Cambridge. He was incorporated at Oxford in 1706. He held livings at St Margaret's, Laceby; St Andrew's, Clewer, and St Dionis Backchurch in the City of London. He was appointed Archdeacon of St Albans in 1713; and Precentor and Treasurer of St Paul's Cathedral in 1714.

He was an investor in the slave-trade, buying shares in the Royal African Company worth £1,000 (equivalent to £168,900 in 2025) in 1714.

He died on 15 September 1715, bequeathing money for scholarships at Jesus College, Cambridge.
