= Lucius Cary, 2nd Viscount Falkland =

English author and politician (died 1643)

The Right Honourable The Viscount Falkland PC
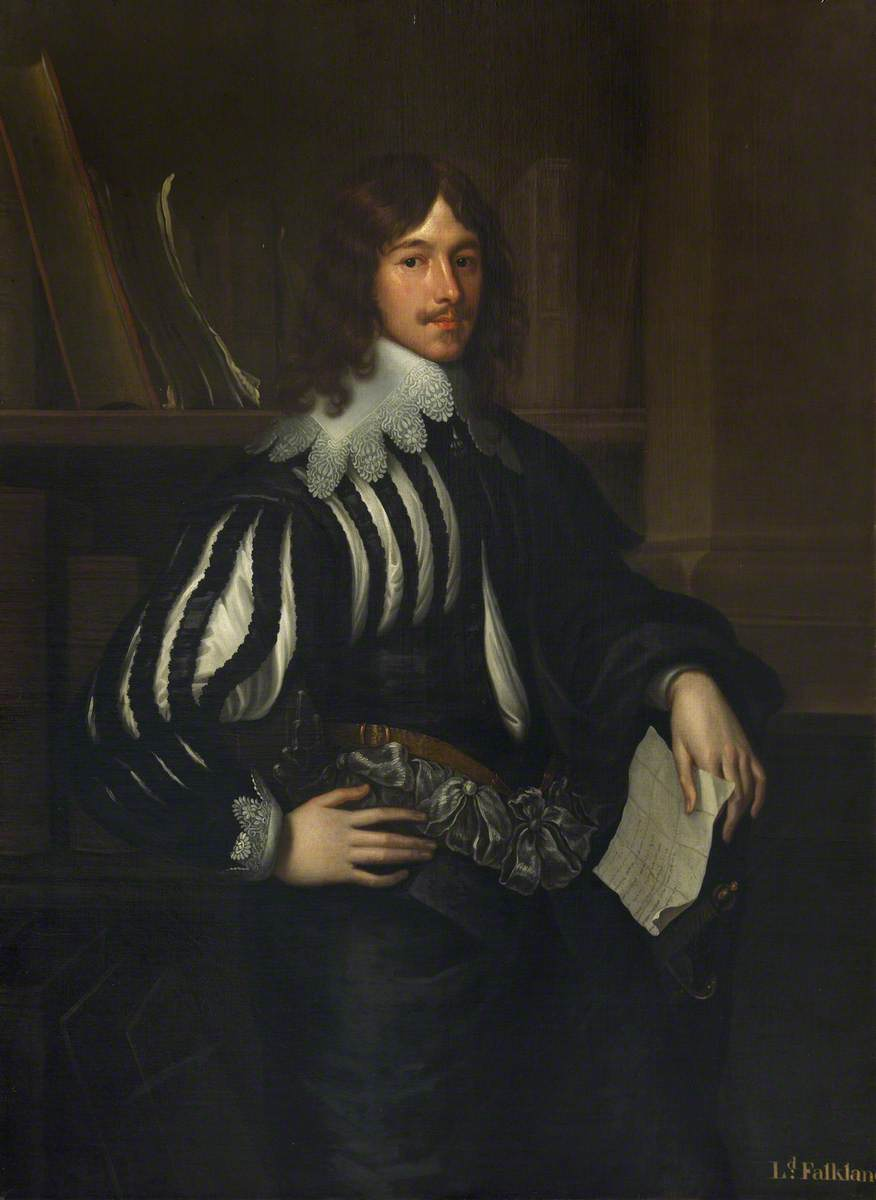
- 1630s portrait by Anthony van Dyck

Secretary of State
- In office 8 January 1642 – 20 September 1643
- Monarch: Charles I
- Preceded by: Sir Edward Nicholas
- Succeeded by: The Earl of Bristol

Lord Privy Seal
- In office 1643–1643
- Monarch: Charles I
- Preceded by: The Earl of Manchester
- Succeeded by: Sir Edward Nicholas

Personal details
- Born: c. 1610 Burford, Oxfordshire, England
- Died: 20 September 1643 (aged 32 or 33) Newbury, Berkshire, England
- Spouse: Lettice Moryson
- Children: Lucius Cary, 3rd Viscount Falkland; Henry Cary, 4th Viscount Falkland
- Parents: Henry Cary, 1st Viscount Falkland; Elizabeth Tanfield
- Education: Trinity College, Dublin; St John's College, Cambridge

Military service
- Allegiance: Royalist
- Rank: Cavalrymen
- Battles/wars: English Civil War: Battle of Edgehill; Siege of Gloucester; First Battle of Newbury

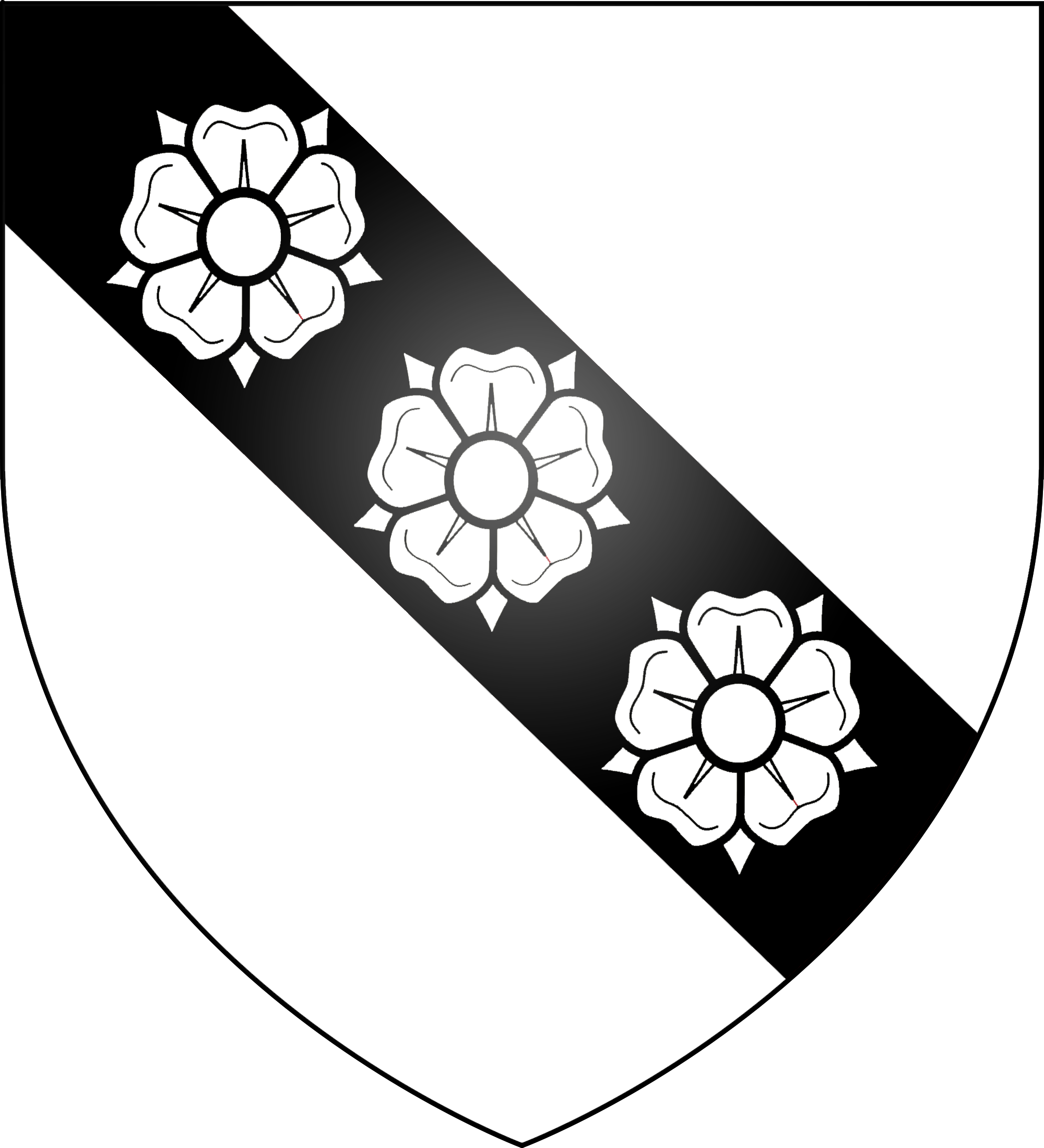
Arms of Cary: Argent, on a bend sable three roses of the field

Lucius Cary, 2nd Viscount Falkland PC (c. 1610 – 20 September 1643) was an English writer and politician who sat in the House of Commons from 1640 to 1642. He fought on the Royalist side in the English Civil War and was killed in action at the First Battle of Newbury.

== Early life ==
Cary was born at Burford in either 1609 or 1610 as the son of Sir Henry Cary, afterwards first Viscount Falkland, and his wife Elizabeth, whose father Sir Lawrence Tanfield was at that time Lord Chief Baron of the Exchequer. Henry Cary, a member of an ancient Devon family, was lord deputy of Ireland from 1622 to 1629. He was made Viscount Falkland and Lord Cary in 1620. His viscountcy, Falkland, was a royal burgh in Scotland, notwithstanding that the Carys were an English family and had no connection with the burgh, though letters patent were later issued naturalising the Viscount and his successors as Scottish subjects.

In 1621 Lucius was admitted to St John's College, Cambridge but in the following year he migrated to Trinity College, Dublin, where he graduated BA in 1625. In 1625 he inherited from his grandfather the manors of Great Tew and Burford in Oxfordshire, and, about the age of 21, married Lettice, daughter of Sir Richard Moryson, of Tooley Park in Leicestershire. Following a quarrel with his father, whom he failed to propitiate by offering to hand over to him his estate, he left England to take service in the Dutch army, but soon returned. In 1633, by the death of his father, he became Viscount Falkland. His mother had embraced Roman Catholicism, to which it was now sought to attract Falkland himself, but his studies and reflections led him, under the influence of William Chillingworth, to the interpretation of religious problems rather by reason than by tradition or authority.

In 1634, he sold Burford Priory to William Lenthall.

== Great Tew circle ==
At Great Tew he enjoyed a short but happy period of study, and he assembled a cultured circle, whom the near neighbourhood of the university and his own qualities attracted to his house. He was the friend of John Hales and Chillingworth, was celebrated by Ben Jonson, John Suckling, Abraham Cowley and Edmund Waller in verse, and in prose by Edward Hyde, 1st Earl of Clarendon, who calls him the "incomparable" Falkland, and draws a picture of his society and hospitality.

== Political and military career ==
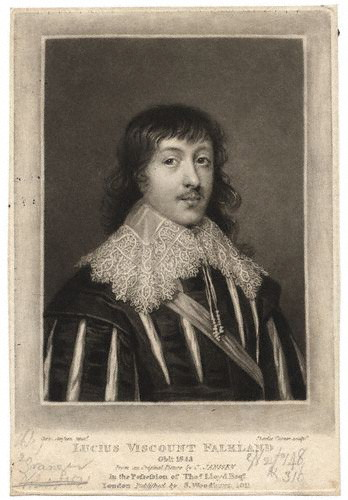
Engraving depicting Lord Falkland, based on a portrait by Cornelis Janssens van Ceulen.

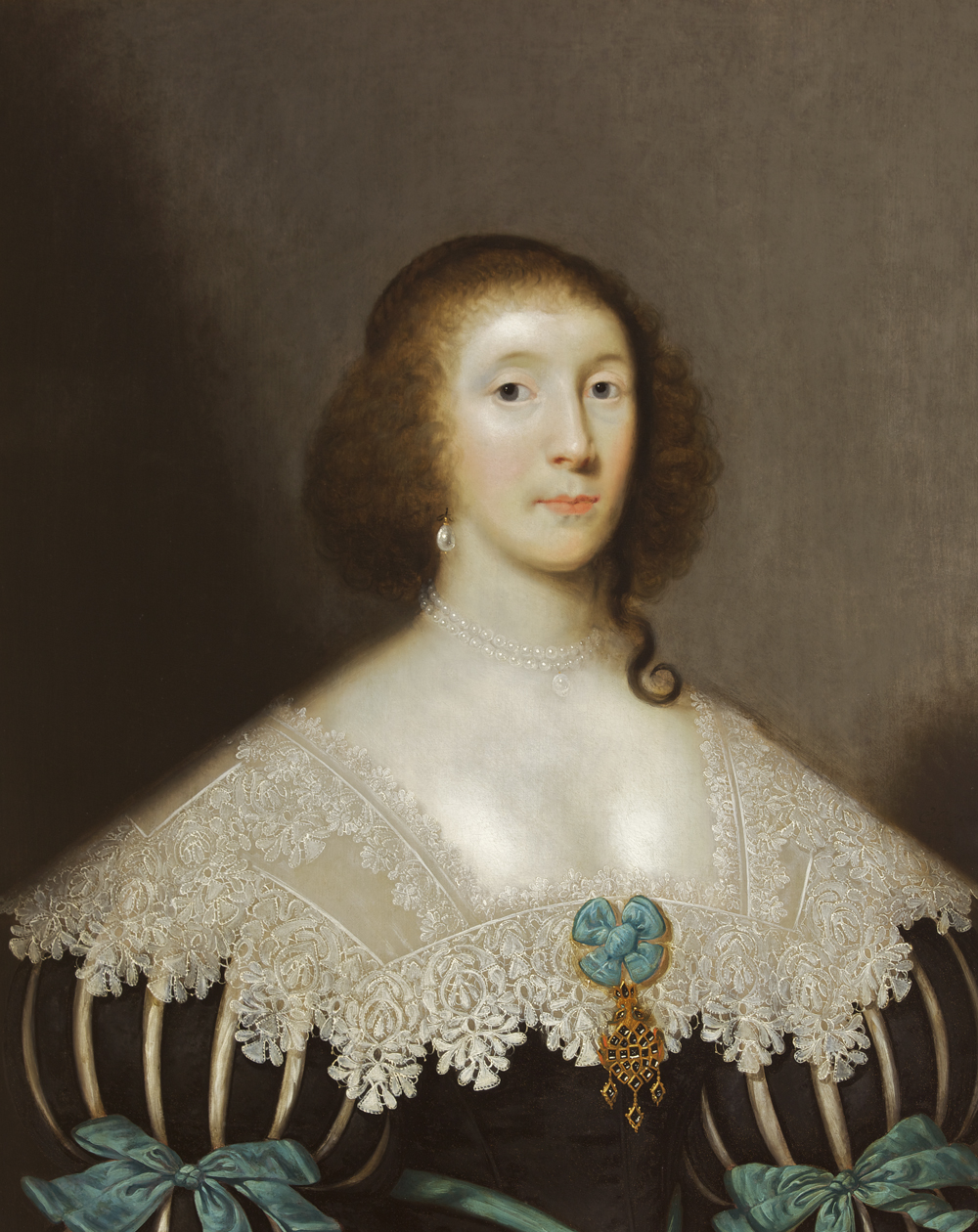
Falkland's wife, Lettice

Falkland's intellectual pleasures, however, were soon interrupted by war and politics. He felt it his duty to take part on the side of King Charles I as a volunteer under the Earl of Essex in the Bishops' Wars of 1639 against the Scots. In 1640 he was elected Member of Parliament for Newport in the Isle of Wight to the Short Parliament. He was re-elected for Newport for the Long Parliament in November 1640, and took an active part on the side of the opposition. He spoke against the exaction of ship money on 7 December 1640, denouncing the servile conduct of Lord Keeper Finch and the judges.

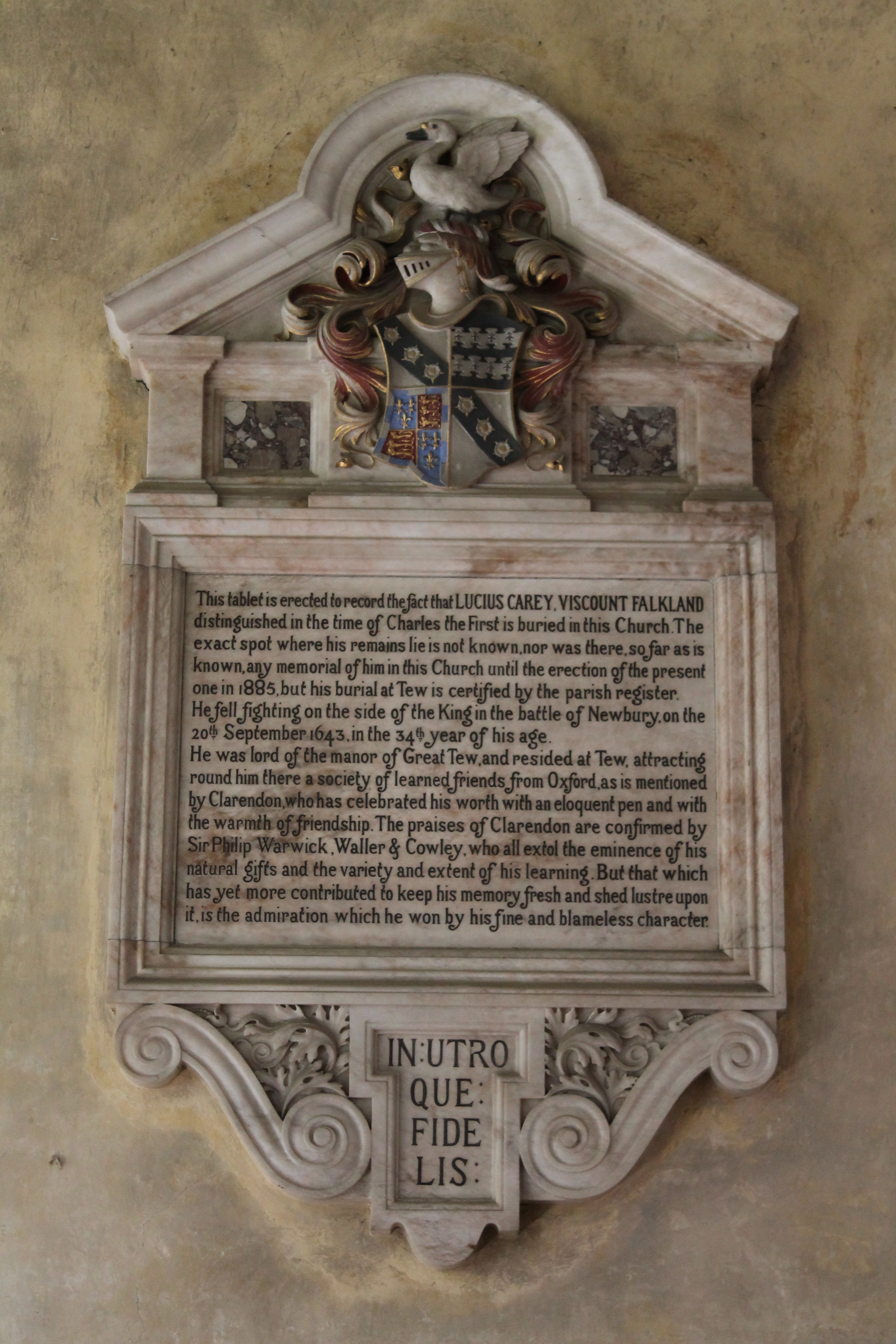
Mural monument to Lucius Carey, 2nd Viscount Falkland, erected 1885, south chancel wall, Church of St Michael & All Angels, Great Tew. The arms are quarterly 1 & 4: Cary; 2: Spencer of Spencercombe, Crediton, Devon; 3: Beaufort

He supported the prosecution of Thomas Wentworth, 1st Earl of Strafford, at the same time trying more than once to moderate the measures of the House of Commons in the interests of justice, and voted for the third reading of the attainder on 21 April 1641. On the question of the church he urged, in the debate of 8 February 1641, that the interference of the clergy in secular matters, the encroachments in jurisdiction of the spiritual courts, and the imposition by authority of unnecessary ceremonies, should be prohibited. On the other hand, though he denied that episcopacy existed jure divino, he was opposed to its abolition; fearing the establishment of the Presbyterian system, which in Scotland had proved equally tyrannical. Triennial parliaments would be sufficient to control the bishops, if they meditated any further attacks upon the national liberties, and he urged that "where it is not necessary to change, it is necessary not to change". (This was probably said in reply to John Hampden during the Root and Branch Bill debate that happened later.) Even John Hampden still believed that a compromise with the episcopal principle was possible, and assured Falkland that if the bill taken up to the House of Lords on 1 May 1641, excluding the bishops from the Lords and the clergy from secular offices, were passed, "there would be nothing more attempted to the prejudice of the church". Accordingly, the bill was supported by Falkland.

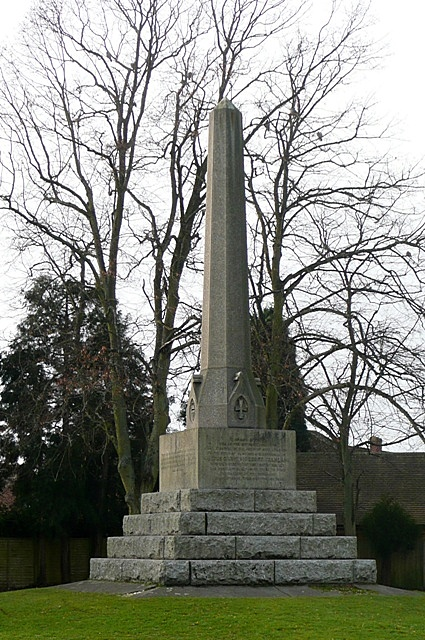
Monument to Lucius Cary in Newbury

The times, however, were not favourable to compromise. The bill was lost in the Lords, and on 27 May the Root and Branch Bill, for the total abolition of episcopacy, was introduced in the House of Commons. This measure Falkland opposed, as well as the second bill for excluding the bishops, introduced on 21 October 1641. In the discussion on the Grand Remonstrance he took the part of the bishops and the Arminians. He was now opposed to the whole policy of the opposition, and, being reproached by John Hampden with his change of attitude, replied "that he had formerly been persuaded by that worthy gentleman to believe many things which he had since found to be untrue, and therefore he had changed his opinion in many particulars as well as to things as to persons".

On 1 January 1642, immediately before the attempted arrest of the five members, of which, however, Falkland was unaware, the King offered him the secretaryship of state, and Sir Edward Hyde (later Lord Clarendon) persuaded him to accept it. Falkland thus became involved directly in the king's policy, though evidently possessing little influence in his counsels. He was one of the peers who signed the protestation against making war, at York on 15 June 1642. On 5 September 1642 he carried Charles's overtures for peace to the parliament, when he informed the leaders of the opposition that the king consented to a thorough reformation of religion. The secret correspondence connected with the Waller plot passed through his hands.

Falkland fought for the king at the Battle of Edgehill (23 October 1642) and at the Siege of Gloucester. By this time the hopelessness of the situation had completely overwhelmed him. The aims and principles of neither party in the conflict could satisfy a man of Falkland's high ideals and intellectual vision. His royalism could not suffer the substitution, as the controlling power in the state, of a parliament for the monarchy, nor his conservatism the revolutionary changes in church and state now insisted upon by the opposite faction. The fatal character and policy of the king, the most incapable of men and yet the man upon whom all depended, must have been by now thoroughly understood by Falkland. Compromise had long been out of the question. The victory of either side could only bring misery; and the prolongation of the war was a prospect equally unhappy.

Falkland's ideals and hopes were now destroyed, and he had no definite political convictions such as inspired and strengthened Strafford and John Pym. In fact his sensitive nature shrank from contact with the practical politics of the day and prevented his rise to the place of a leader or a statesman. Lord Clarendon has recorded his final relapse into despair:

Sitting among his friends, often, after a deep silence and frequent sighs (he) would with a shrill and sad accent ingeminate the word "Peace, Peace," and would passionately profess that the very agony of the war, and the view of the calamities and desolation the kingdom did and must endure, took his sleep from him and would shortly break his heart.

At Gloucester he had in vain exposed himself to risks. On the morning of the First Battle of Newbury, on 20 September 1643, he declared to his friends, who would have dissuaded him from taking part in the fight, that "he was weary of the times and foresaw much misery to his own Country and did believe he should be out of it ere night." He served during the engagement as a volunteer under Sir John Byron and, riding alone at a gap in a hedge commanded by the enemy's fire, was immediately killed.

His body was stripped and left until recognised by a servant, who took his body back to Great Tew, where he was buried in an unmarked grave in the village churchyard.

== Death and legacy ==
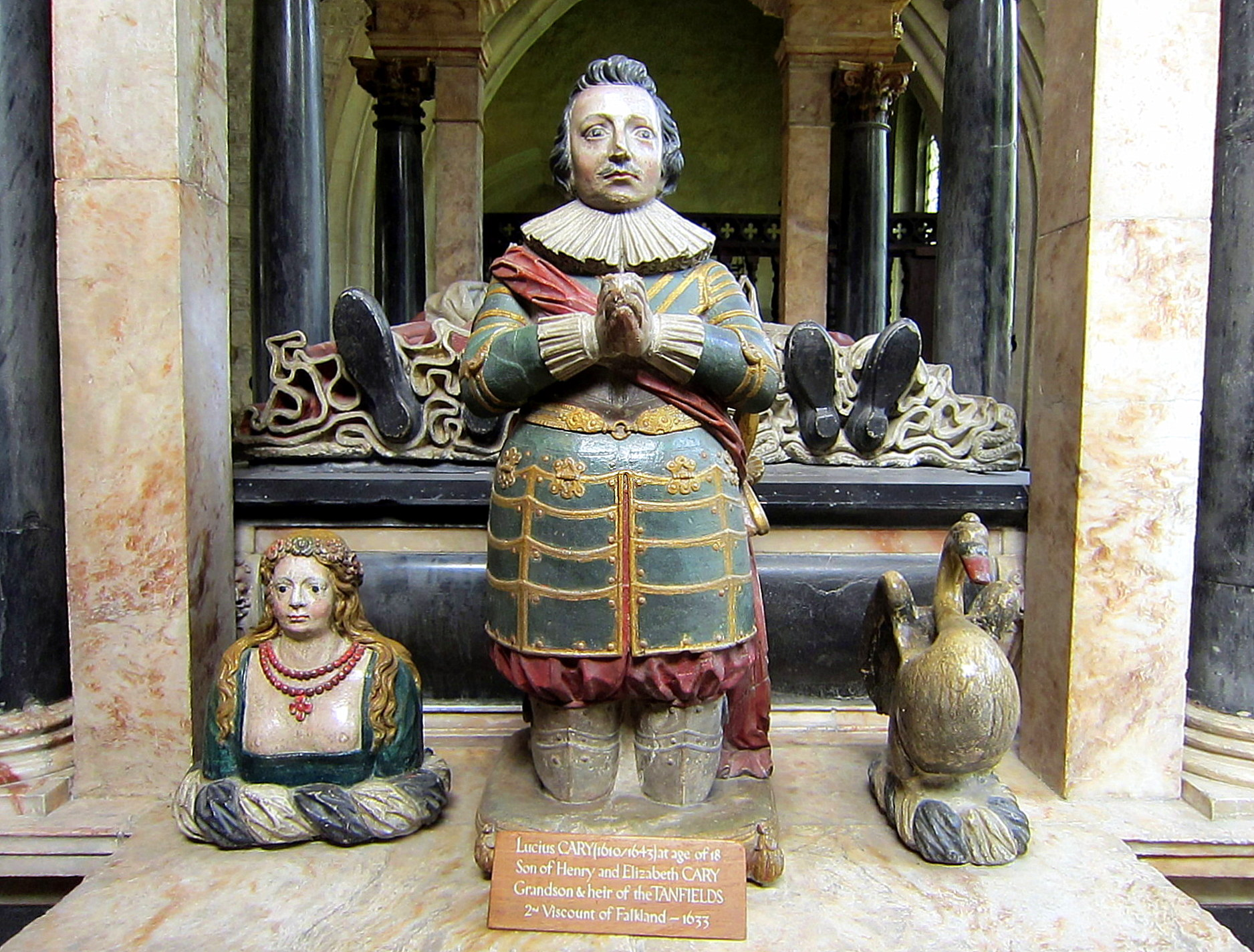
Sculpture of Lucius Cary in front of the grave of his grandparents in the Church of St John the Baptist, Burford

He died at the age of 33 and was succeeded in the title by his eldest son Lucius, 3rd Viscount Falkland. His male descent became extinct in the person of Anthony, 5th viscount in 1694, when the viscounty passed to Lucius Henry (1687–1730), a descendant of the first viscount via another line.

A statue of Falkland sculpted by John Bell in 1845 stands in St Stephen's Hall in the Houses of Parliament. In 1909 a suffragette called Margery Humes chained herself to the statue while protesting for women's right to vote. The authorities were unable to remove her without chipping off much of the spur on the statue's right boot. As it was never repaired, this lasting damage is considered a symbol of the suffragettes' struggle.

== Works ==
Falkland wrote a Discourse of Infallibility, published in 1646 (Thomason Tracts, E 361), reprinted in 1650, in 1651 (E 634) edited by Triplet with replies, and in 1660 with the addition of two discourses on episcopacy by Falkland. This is a work of some importance in theological controversy, the general argument being that "to those who follow their reason in the interpretation of the Scriptures God will either give his grace for assistance to find the truth or his pardon if they miss it. And then this supposed necessity of an infallible guide (with the supposed damnation for the want of it) fall together to the ground." Also A Letter ... 30 Sept. 1642 concerning the late conflict before Worcester (1642); and Poems, in which he shows himself a follower of Ben Jonson, edited by A. B. Grosart in Miscellanies of the Fuller Worthies Library, vol. iii. (f 871).

John Aubrey attributed to Falkland the title "the first Socinian in England" but later gave that title to John Hales.

Also attributed to Falkland is the dictum, "When it is not necessary to make a decision, it is necessary not to make a decision."

== Assessment ==
According to Clarendon, he was:

In no degree attractive or promising. His stature was low and smaller than most men; his motion not graceful ... but that little person and small stature was quickly found to contain a great heart ... all mankind could not but admire and love him.

== Bibliography ==
- There is a Life and Times by John Arthur Ransome Marriott (1907): see also S. R. Gardiner's History of England; History of the Civil War; the same author's article in the Dictionary of National Biography.

Parliament of England
| Vacant Parliament suspended since 1629 | Member of Parliament for Newport (Isle of Wight); 1640–1642; With: Henry Worsley | Succeeded by Henry Worsley; William Stephens |
Political offices
| Preceded by Sir Edward Nicholas | Secretary of State; 1642–1643; With: Sir Edward Nicholas | Succeeded by Sir Edward Nicholas; The Earl of Bristol |
| Preceded by The Earl of Manchester | Lord Privy Seal; 1643 | Succeeded by Sir Edward Nicholas |
Peerage of Scotland
| Preceded by Henry Cary | Viscount Falkland; 1633–1643 | Succeeded by Lucius Henry Cary |
