= Clovelly (disambiguation) =

Clovelly is a town and electoral ward in Devon, England.

Clovelly may also refer to:

== Places ==
- Manor of Clovelly, a historic manor in North Devon, England
- Bratton Clovelly, a village in West Devon, England
- Clovelly, Cape Town, a suburb of Cape Town, South Africa
- Clovelly, New South Wales, a suburb of Sydney, Australia
- Clovelly Park, South Australia, a suburb of Adelaide, Australia

== Ships ==
- SS Empire Caicos, the cargo ship SS Clovelly in service from 1962 to 1967
- SS Clovelly (ferry), a steam ferry that operated on Okanagan Lake in British Columbia, Canada
- Clovelly-class fleet tenders, a class of Royal Maritime Auxiliary Service boats

== See also ==
- Clovelly Court, a country house in Clovelly, Devon, England
- Clovelly Dykes, an Iron Age hill fort or earthwork near Clovelly, Devon, England
- Clovelly Trails, a neighbourhood in St. John's, Newfoundland and Labrador, Canada
