= Sir James Hamlyn, 1st Baronet =

British politician

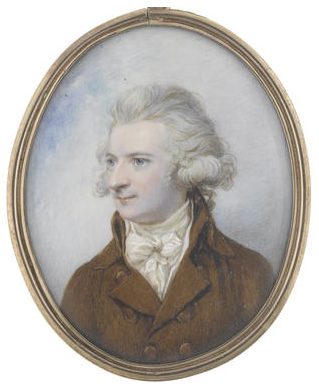
Miniature portrait of Sir James Hamlyn, 1st Baronet (1735–1811). One of a pair with portrait of his wife. School of Richard Cosway (1742–1821), RA

Sir James Hamlyn, 1st Baronet (1735–1811) (born James Hammet) of Clovelly Court in Devon, and of Edwinsford, Carmarthenshire, Wales, was a Member of Parliament (MP) for Carmarthen 1793–1802. He served as Sheriff of Devon in 1767–8. He was created a baronet in 1795. He not only inherited a large estate in Devon from his wealthy childless great-uncle, but also married a wealthy Welsh heiress.

== Origins ==
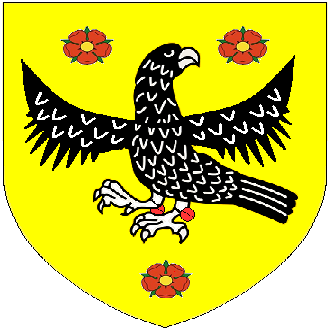
Arms of Hammett: Or, a falcon sable belled gules between three roses gules leaved vert

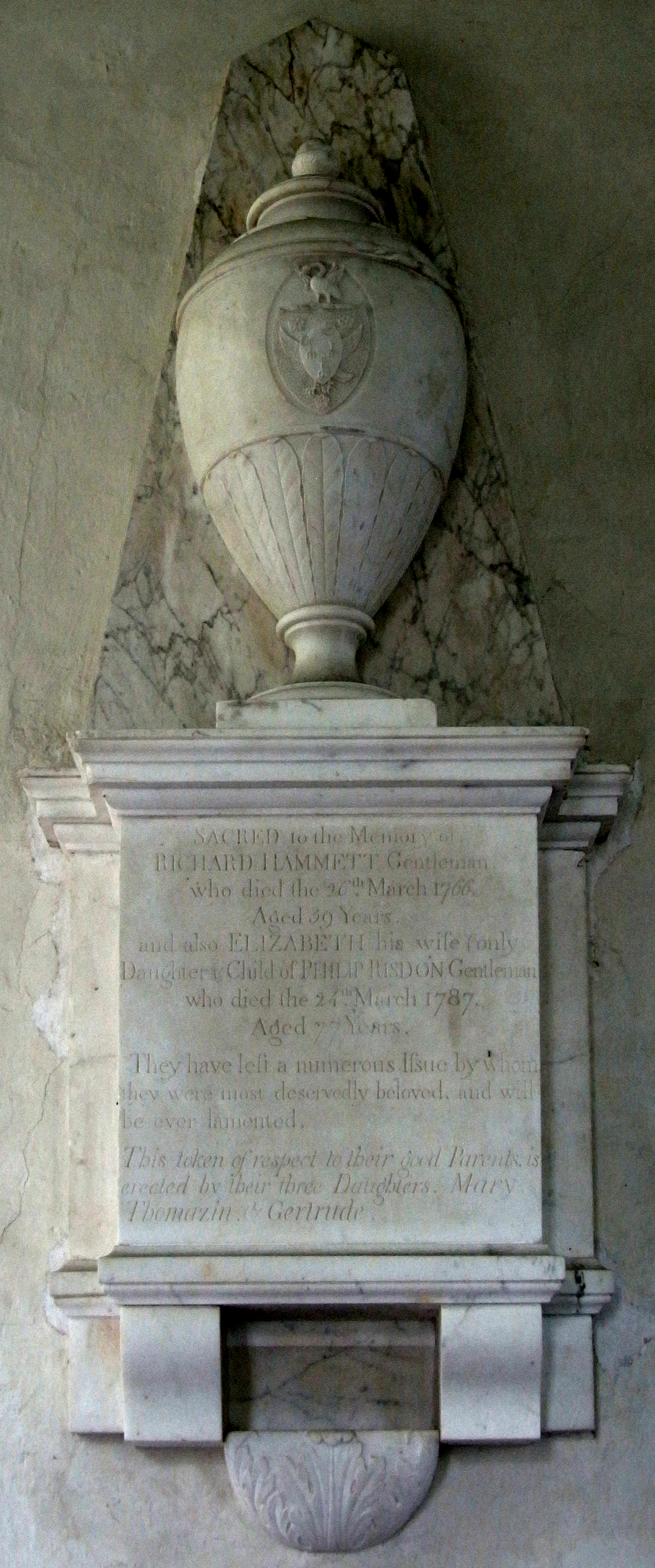
Mural monument to Hammett and his wife in Holy Trinity Church, Woolfardisworthy

James Hammett was born in October 1735, the eldest son of Richard Hammett (1707–1766) of Kennerland, in the parish of Clovelly, Devon, by his wife Elizabeth Risdon (1710–1787), daughter and sole heiress of Philip Risdon, Gentleman. The mural monument to his parents survives in Holy Trinity Church, Woolfardisworthy, near Clovelly, inscribed as follows:

"Sacred to the memory of Richard Hammett, Gentleman, who died the 26th March 1766 aged 59 years and also Elizabeth his wife (only daughter and child of Philip Risdon, Gentleman) who died the 24th March 1787 aged 77 years. They have left a numerous issue by whom they were most deservedly beloved and will be ever lamented. This token of respect to their good parents is erected by their three daughters Mary, Thomazin & Gertrude"

It shows the arms of Hammett (Or, a falcon sable belled gules between three roses gules leaved vert) with inescutcheon of pretence of Risdon of Bableigh: (Argent, three birding bolts sable), with crest of Hammett above: A swan with wings endorsed argent collared gules winged beaked and legged or holding in his beak a bolt sable. The Risdons were an ancient Devonshire family seated at Bableigh in the parish of Parkham (near Clovelly), with a junior branch at Winscott in the parish of St Giles in the Wood, near Great Torrington, of which latter family was the Devon historian Tristram Risdon (died 1640).

== Inheritance ==
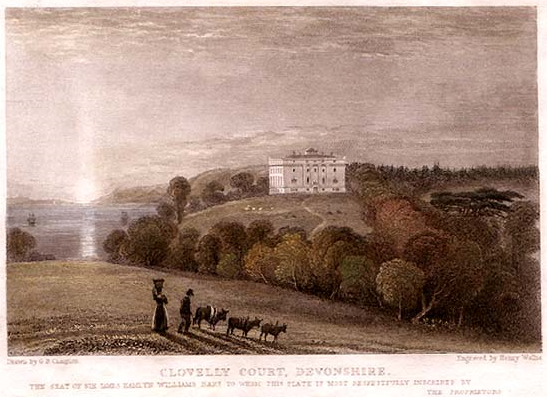
Clovelly Court in 1831, as rebuilt by the 1st Baronet after the fire in 1789. Engraving after a painting by George Bryant Campion (1795–1870)

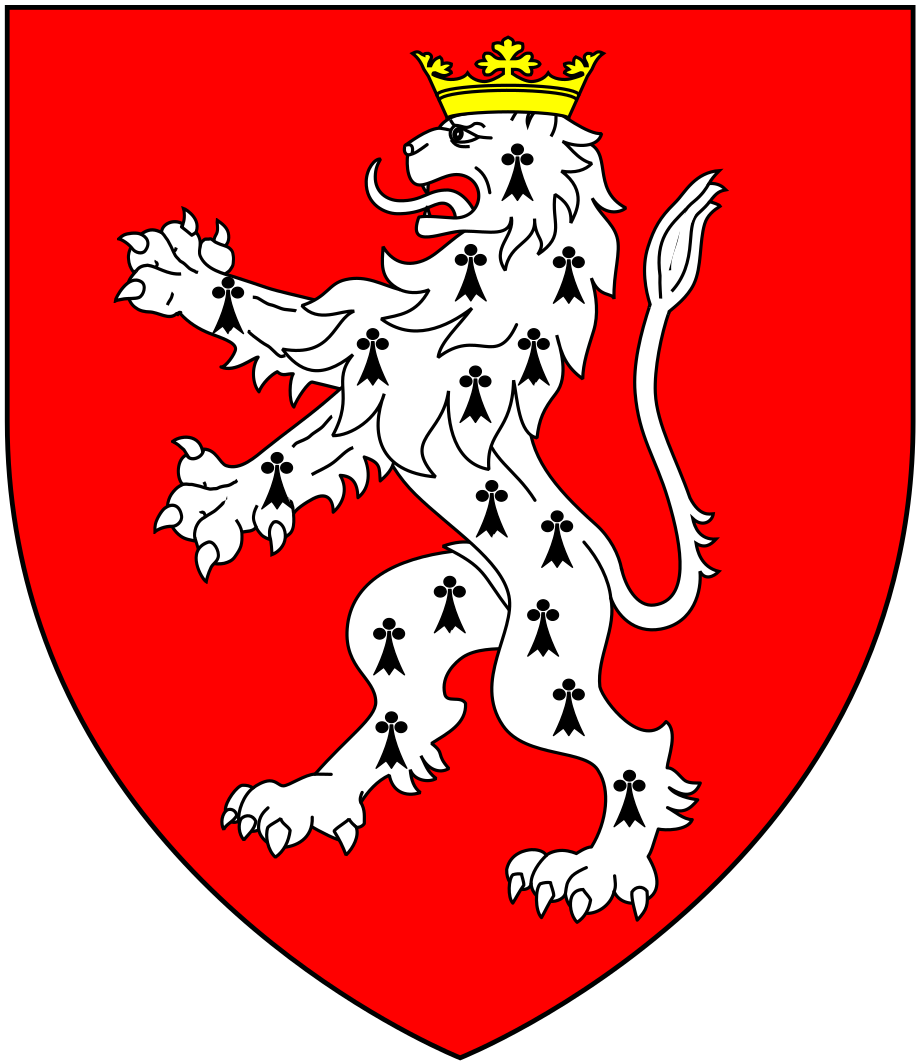
Arms of Hamlyn, adopted by James Hammett as a condition of his inheritance: Gules, a lion rampant ermine crowned or. As shown on mural monument to Zachary Hamlyn (1677–1759) in Clovelly Church

In 1759 he became heir to the manor of Clovelly, following the death of his unmarried great-uncle Zachary Hamlyn (1677–1759), of Woolfardisworthy, three miles south-east of Clovelly, a lawyer of Lincoln's Inn and a Clerk of the Journals of the House of Commons, who in 1738 had purchased the manor of Clovelly from the last of the Cary family, longtime lords of the manor, and had made Clovelly Court his residence.

The Hamlyn family is believed to have descended from Hamelin, the Domesday Book tenant in 1086 of two manors (Alwington and Broad Hempston) under the Norman magnate Robert, Count of Mortain (died 1090), half-brother of King William the Conqueror. He may have been the same Hamelin who also held two manors in Cornwall from the same overlord. Sir John Hamlyn, of Larkbeare, in the parish of St Leonard, Exeter, father of Sir Osbert, was at the Battle of Bouroughbridge in 1322, and his arms are recorded on the roll of arms of the Knights present: Gules, a lion rampant ermine, crowned or.

According to Worthy (1892), the branch of the family "which long flourished in much repute in Woolfardisworthy" seems to have descended from John Hamlyn, fourth son of Richard Hamlyn, of Widecombe, and brother to Robert and Thomas, paternal and maternal ancestors of the Hamlyn family resident at Buckfastleigh in 1892. The first Hamlyn of Woolfardisworthy was William Hamlyn of Mershwell, whose arms, as previously blazoned, were on two shields in painted glass in one of the windows at Mershwell, with the date 1540. William Hamlyn was born in 1540, and was buried at Woolfardisworthy in 1597. By his wife, Agnes Yeo, of Stratton, he had a son, William, whose son William, of Mershwell, was baptized at Woolfardisworthy, on the 21 October 1579. His son, William Hamlyn, married Gertrude Cary, and was buried in 1708. He had issue by her fourteen children, and at his death his son Zachary Hamlyn succeeded to Mershwell. Zachary recorded his pedigree at the College of Arms but did not carry it further back than the William Hamlyn who was buried at Woolfardisworthy in 1597.

James Hammet's Name Act 1759
- Act of Parliament
- Parliament of Great Britain
- Long title: An Act to enable James Hammett Esquire and his Issue to take and use the Surname of Hamlyn only
- Citation: 33 Geo. 2. c. 15

Dates
- Royal assent: 24 March 1760

In accordance with the terms of the bequest, in 1760 by Act of Parliament (33 Geo. 2. c. 15), James Hammet adopted the arms (Gules, a lion rampant ermine crowned or) and surname Hamlyn in lieu of his patronymic. According to the Devon topographer Swete (d. 1821), who visited Clovelly in 1797, his brother was Mr Hamet, "clergyman of Clovelly" who had recently built at Clovelly a house "of very neat appearance, standing high in a small lawn and shrubbery".

== Career ==
He received his legal education at Lincoln's Inn in 1750. He served as Lord Lieutenant of Carmarthenshire and as Member of Parliament for Carmarthen 1793–1802, and as Sheriff of Devon 1767-8. He was created a baronet on 7 July 1795.

== Rebuilds Clovelly Court ==
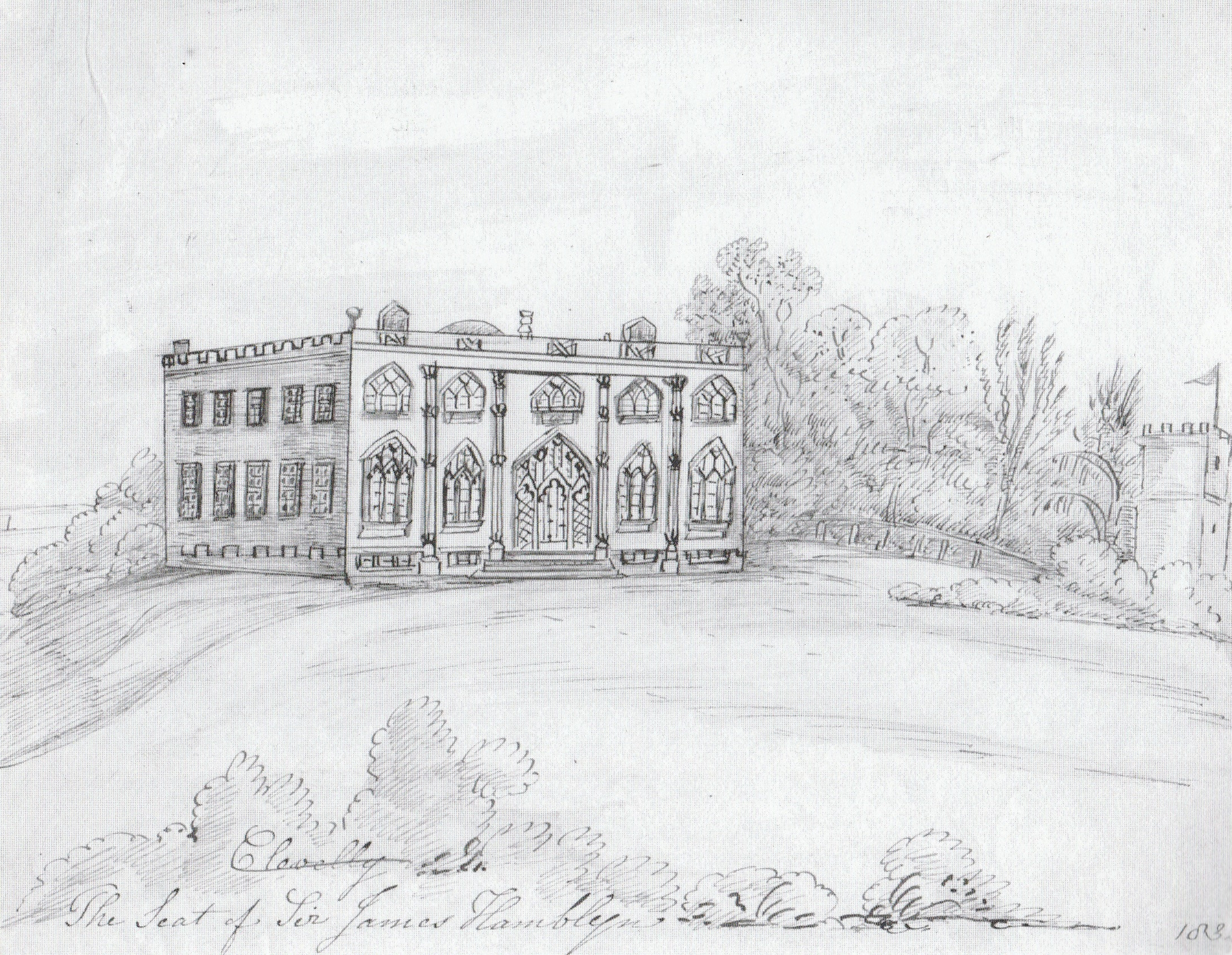
1832 ink sketch attributed to A.P. Radcliffe inscribed: "Clovelly the seat of Sir James Hamblyn (sic) 1832" (i.e. during ownership of the 2nd Baronet). The tower of the parish church is visible at right

In 1789 his manor house Clovelly Court was destroyed by fire and he rebuilt it in the then fashionable Georgian-Gothic style. In 1797 Swete wrote as follows in his Journal concerning his visit to Clovelly:

"At this spot a road diverging to the right led towards Clovelly. My guide, who proved to be Sir James Hamlyn's bailiff or hind, conducted me through a gateway and a plantation to Court, the seat of the baronet. The old mansion of the Carys had been demolished a few years ago by an accidental fire and the present fabric had been raised by the plans of the possessor... The front which first appeared was that of entrance; this was altogether Gothic. A good deal of taste in an assemblage of ornaments appropriate to this kind of architecture was displayed in an open vestibule or portico; these were carved in freestone and wore an air of light elegance. Moving round to the other two fronts, I was astonished to find that the Gothic style had totally disappeared – it had given place to the fashion of modern buildings. The curve of the window had become rectangular and the circle had been squared... I was dissatisfied with this abrupt transition; I was disappointed in not finding a consistency of beauty and parts, where the want of harmony to effect a perfect whole was too glaring not to be noticed by the most superficial observer, and I could not help exclaiming: Infelix operis summa quia ponere totum nescit". (Horace, Ars Poetica I, lines 34-5. "The whole work is unsuccessful because he did not know how to fit it together").

Swete's verdict concerning the landscape and natural setting were in contrast entirely complimentary.

== Marriage and children ==
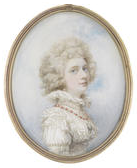
Miniature portrait of Arabella Williams (died 1797), wife of Sir James Hamlyn, 1st Baronet (1735–1811). One of a pair with portrait of her husband. School of Richard Cosway (1742–1821), RA

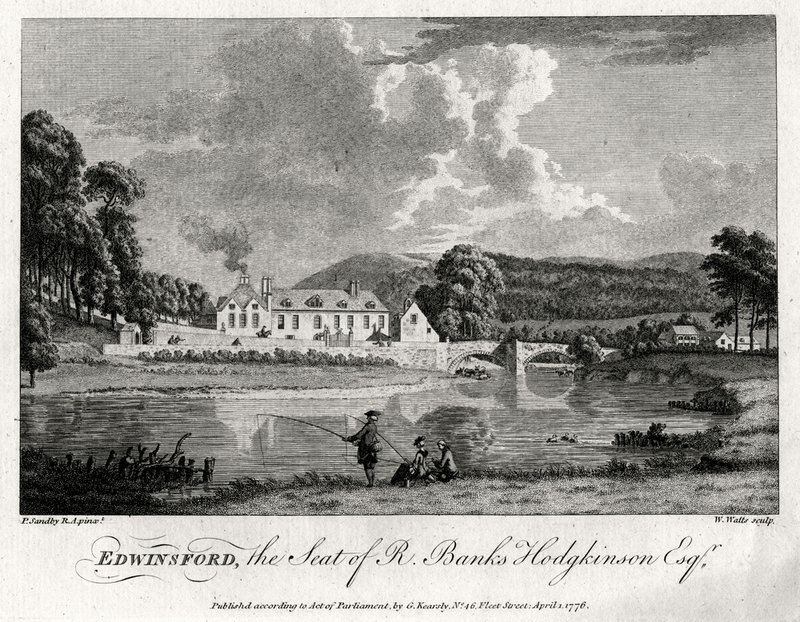
1776 engraving titled "Edwinsford, the seat of R. Banks Hodgkinson, Esq.", after painting by Paul Sandby (1731–1809), RA. A ruin in 2014.

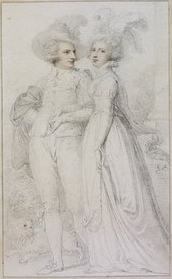
Hamlyn and his wife Arabella, in Van Dyck costume. Watercolour circa 1789 by Richard Cosway (1742–1821).

On 11 June 1762 Hamlyn married Arabella Williams (died 1797), daughter and eventual heiress of Thomas Williams (died 1762) of Edwinsford, Llandeilo, and of Court Derllys, both in Carmarthenshire. In 1797 Swete wrote in his Journal concerning Sir James Hamlyn:

This gentleman was originally in the law and marrying a Miss Williams of vast fortune in Carmarthenshire, he has lately taken up the chief part of his residence at his seat in that county.

The family of Williams (alias Rhydodin), claimed descent from Hywel Dda and Rhodri Mawr, and from King Henry I of England, via Ellen, wife of Llewelyn ap Phylip. Thomas Williams had inherited Edwinsford from his childless elder brother Sir Nicholas Williams, 1st Baronet (1681–1745). He married twice, firstly to Arabella Vaughan, daughter and co-heiress of John Vaughan of Court Derllys, Carmarthenshire, without children, and secondly to Anne Singleton, daughter of William Singleton of London. His eldest daughter and heiress from his second marriage was Bridget Williams, who lived at Edwinsford with her husband Robert Banks Hodgkinson (c. 1721 – 1792), of Overton, MP for Wareham in Dorset 1748–51 and High Sheriff of Carmarthenshire in 1784. As Bridget died without children, Edwinsford was inherited by her younger sister Arabella Williams, wife of James Hamlyn, 1st Baronet. By Arabella he had two sons and one daughter:

- Sir James Hamlyn-Williams, 2nd Baronet (1765–1829), who assumed the additional surname of Williams in 1798 .
- Zachary Hamlyn, who died young;
- Arabella Hamlyn (d. 1805), who married Ambrose St John (1760–1822), MP for Callington and Lt-Col Commandant of the Supply Militia of Worcestershire, who died at Douglas on 29 November 1822, and whose monument survives in Worcester Cathedral, eldest son of St Andrew St John (1732–1795), Dean of Worcester Cathedral, the second son of John St John, 11th Baron St John of Bletso. She left two sons (St Andrew St John and Beauchamp St John (d.18 April 1827 at Douglas)) and five daughters, as is recorded on the monument.

== Death and burial ==
He died on 28 May 1811 and was buried in All Saints Church, Clovelly, next to Clovelly Court. Monuments (both by T. King & Sons of Bath) survive in the church to the 1st Baronet, showing a seated woman by an urn, and to his wife, showing a standing woman by an urn.

== Sources ==
- Thorne, R.G., biography of Hamlyn, James (1735–1811), of Edwinsford, Carmarthen and Clovelly Court, Devon, published in History of Parliament: House of Commons 1790–1820, ed. R. Thorne, 1986
- Lauder, Rosemary, Devon Families, Tiverton, 2002, pp. 131–136, Rous of Clovelly

Parliament of Great Britain
Preceded by Hon. George Talbot Rice	Member of Parliament for Carmarthenshire; 1793–1801	Succeeded by Parliament of the United Kingdom
Parliament of the United Kingdom
Preceded by Parliament of Great Britain	Member of Parliament for Carmarthenshire; 1801–1802	Succeeded by James Hamlyn-Williams
Baronetage of Great Britain
New creation	Baronet (of Clovelly); 1785–1811	Succeeded by James Hamlyn-Williams
