= Pattawilya =

Pattawilya may refer to:

- a later name for the ship built as SS Empire Caicos
- the Kaurna name for the area around Glenelg, South Australia
