= Hamlyn-Williams baronets =

The Hamlyn, later Hamlyn-Williams Baronetcy, of Clovelly Court in the County of Devon and of Edwinsford in the County of Carmarthen, was a title in the Baronetage of Great Britain. It was created on 7 July 1795 for James Hamlyn (born James Hammett), heir of his great-uncle Zachary Hamlyn (1677–1759) of Clovelly. He married Arabella Williams, daughter and eventual heiress of Thomas Williams (d.1792) of Edwinsford, Llandeilo, in Carmarthenshire, himself the heir of his elder brother Sir Nicholas Williams, 1st Baronet (1681–1745) of Edwinsford. He was Member of Parliament for Carmarthenshire from 1793 to 1802.

The 2nd Baronet assumed the additional surname of Williams in 1798, in connection with an inheritance. He represented Carmarthen in parliament from 1802 to 1806. His son the 3rd Baronet, a "staunch reformer", came into parliament unopposed in 1832, serving also from 1835 to 1837. The title became extinct on his death in 1861.

== Hamlyn, later Hamlyn-Williams baronets, of Clovelly Court and Edwinsford (1795) ==
- Sir James Hamlyn, 1st Baronet (1735–1811)
- Sir James Hamlyn-Williams, 2nd Baronet (1765–1829)
- Sir James Hamlyn-Williams, 3rd Baronet (1790–1861)

== Extended family ==
- Charles Hamlyn-Williams, younger son of the 2nd Baronet, was a Rear-Admiral in the Royal Navy.
- Susan Hester Hamlyn-Williams, eldest daughter of the 3rd Baronet, inherited the family seat of Clovelly Court and married Henry Fane, who assumed the surname Hamlyn-Fane.

== Arms ==
Coat of arms of Hamlyn of Clovelly Court
Crest A swan, with wings endorsed Argent, collared Gules, winged, beaked and legged Or, holding in his beak a bolt Sable. Escutcheon Or, a falcon Sable, belled Gules, between three roses Gules, leave Vert.

Coat of arms of Hamlyn-Williams of Clovelly Court and Edwinsford
Notes No royal licence can be found, so these the arms of Williams of Edwinsford are quartered as a standard quartering through an heiress. Crest A swan, with wings endorsed Argent, collared Gules, winged, beaked and legged Or, holding in his beak a bolt Sable. Escutcheon Quarterly, 1st and 4th: Or, a falcon Sable, belled Gules, between three roses Gules, leave Vert (Hamlyn); 2nd and 3rd: Argent, a lion rampant Sable, face, paws and tuft of the tail of the Field (Williams). Motto Mea virtute me involvo.

== See also ==
- Williams-Drummond baronets
- Williams baronets

Baronetage of Great Britain
Preceded by Vanden-Bempde-Johnstone baronets	Hamlyn baronets of Clovelly Court and Edwinsford; 7 July 1795	Succeeded by Poore baronets
