= Clovelly Dykes =

Iron Age hill fort in Devon, England

Coordinates: 50.9855°N 4.4072°W

Clovelly Dykes is an Iron Age hill fort or earthwork near Clovelly, Devon, England. Situated on the high plateau behind the coast at approx 210 metres above sea level, it is one of the largest and most impressive Early Iron Age hill-forts in Devon. It is a complex series of earthworks covering more than 20 acres (8.1 ha).

An excavation was carried out at Clovelly Dykes in about 1903, but it is poorly documented. The site was designated a scheduled monument in 1924. Substrata carried out geophysical surveys south of the site in 2017 and 2018, and surveys of the fort's interior in 2019. Excavations were carried out in 2018 and 2019.
