= Battle of Sainte-Foy =

1760 battle in Quebec during the Seven Years' War

- Part of the Seven Years' War the French and Indian War
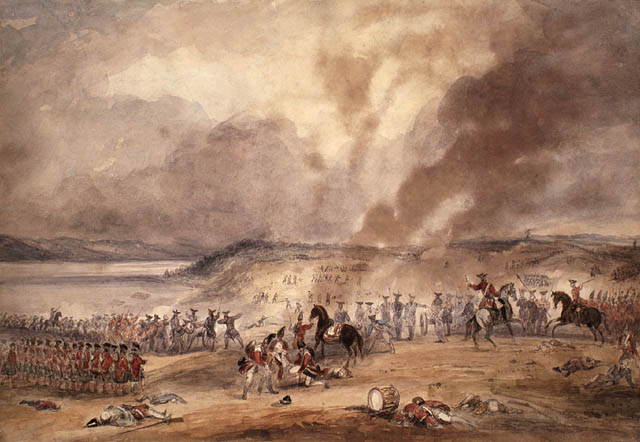
- The Battle of Sainte-Foy by George B. Campion, watercolour.
| Date | April 28, 1760 |
| Location | Quebec, Canada, New France (present-day Canada) 46°48′08″N 71°14′31″W |
| Result | French victory |

Belligerents
| France: (New France) Colony of Canada | Great Britain |

Commanders and leaders
| (Kingdom of France) François Gaston de Lévis | (Kingdom of Great Britain) James Murray |

Strength
| 5,000 regulars and militia | 3,800 regulars 27 guns |

Casualties and losses
| 193 killed 640 wounded | 259 killed 829 wounded 20 guns lost |

The Battle of Sainte-Foy (French: Bataille de Sainte-Foy) sometimes called the Battle of Quebec (French: Bataille du Quebec), was fought on April 28, 1760, near the British-held town of Quebec in the French province of Canada during the Seven Years' War (called the French and Indian War in the United States). It was a victory for the French under the Chevalier de Lévis over the British army under General Murray. The battle was notably bloodier than the Battle of the Plains of Abraham of the previous September, with 833 French casualties to 1,124 British casualties.

At first the British had some success, but the advance masked their artillery, while the infantry became bogged down in the mud and melting snowdrifts of the late spring. The battle turned into a two-hour fight at close range; eventually, as more French soldiers joined the fray, the French turned the British flanks, forcing Murray to realize his mistake and to recall the British back to Quebec without their guns, which Lévis then turned on the city.

== Background ==
New France had suffered significant setbacks in the 1758 campaigns of the French and Indian War. Its fortress at Louisbourg was lost in a siege by British forces, and Fort Duquesne was abandoned to another advancing British army. The situation got worse in 1759 when Fort Carillon and Fort Niagara were taken by the British, and the key city of Quebec fell after a prolonged siege and the Battle of the Plains of Abraham of September 13, 1759. The French army regrouped in Montreal under General Chevalier de Lévis. Meanwhile, the British army, left behind in Quebec after the fleet sailed at the end of October 1759, suffered from hunger, scurvy and the difficulties of living in a city that they had largely destroyed in the siege.

In April 1760, Lévis returned to Quebec with an army of over 7,000 men, including Canadien militia. He hoped to besiege Quebec and force its surrender in the spring, when he expected a French fleet to arrive in his support

General James Murray, left in command at Quebec, believed that his army was too small to adequately defend the walls of Quebec, which had not been improved since the British capture of the town. He therefore moved some 3,800 men into the field, all he could muster, along with over twenty cannon, to the same position that Montcalm had occupied for the 1759 battle. Rather than wait for the French to advance, however, he took the gamble of going on the offensive.

== Battle ==
=== Forces ===
Lévis commanded 6,910 soldiers, including 3,889 in eight regular battalions. Compagnies Franches de la Marine comprised two more battalions. The remainder of his army was made up of Canadien militia. Of this force, approximately 5,000 and only three cannons were present on the field of Sainte-Foy.

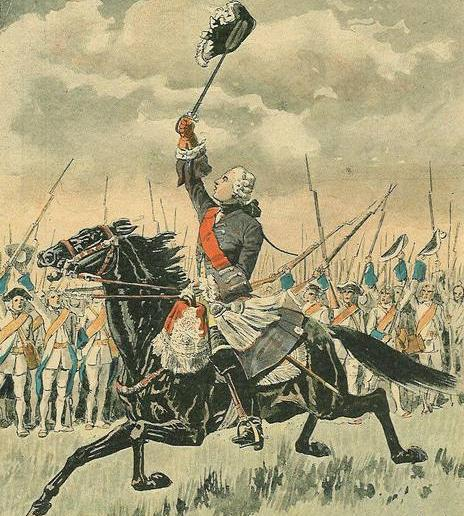
The French general Chevalier de Lévis rallies his army prior to the battle. He commanded regulars of the Compagnies Franches de la Marine and units of the Canadien militia.

Murray's 3,886-man force consisted of ten regular battalions, a converged light infantry battalion, and two companies of rangers. In order to cover the entire plateau, the battalions were each drawn up in two ranks with three-foot gaps between files, instead of the normal elbow-to-elbow formation. There were 40-yard intervals between battalions. The light infantry covered the right flank. In order, from right to left, were the 48th Foot, 15th Foot, 58th Foot, 2nd battalion of the 60th Foot, 43rd Foot, 47th Foot, 78th Foot, and 28th Foot. The rangers and some volunteers covered the left flank. In reserve behind the right flank stood the 35th Foot, while the 3rd battalion of the 60th formed the left flank reserve. The infantry were supported by 20 cannons and two howitzers. One sergeant recorded that the British army was "a poor pitiful handful of half starved scorbutic skeletons."

=== North flank ===
Observing that the French army was still deploying, Murray resolved to strike his enemies before they were ready. As the British advanced, Lévis pulled his three formed right wing brigades back into the Sillery Woods. At this time, the French left wing had not yet deployed. The British light infantry drove some French grenadiers out of a windmill on the right flank. Pursuing, they soon ran into trouble. The French left wing troops aggressively attacked and scattered the light infantry. Murray committed the 35th Foot from his reserve and restored the right flank of the British line. However, a bitter struggle for possession of the windmill continued.

=== Decision ===
The British left flank troops captured some redoubts, but then Lévis launched a powerful counterattack with his right wing. Murray sent in his final reserve, the 3/60th to stop this attack. He also pulled out the 43rd Foot from his center, which Levis had mostly ignored, and moved it to support his left flank. However, the British left flank finally gave way after suffering heavy losses, and the line collapsed from left to right. Lévis later claimed that he tried to cut the British off from Quebec, but a mischance allowed his enemies to escape. Instead of attacking straight ahead, as ordered, one of his right wing brigades went astray, heading over to help the left wing.

At the beginning of the action the numerous British cannon kept the French attacks at bay. The French advance gained momentum when the guns began to run out of ammunition. When Murray ordered the line forward, their ammunition carts had become bogged in the snow. The British spiked and abandoned their guns in the retreat.

== Result ==
=== Casualties ===
The British army suffered 292 killed, 837 wounded, and 53 captured, for a total of 1,182 casualties. The French lost 833 men, including 193 killed and 640 wounded. The 15th Foot lost 138 out of 386 soldiers of all ranks, or 34% casualties. Three-quarters of the officers of the Fraser Highlanders (78th) were killed or wounded. This makes the Battle of Sainte-Foy one of the bloodiest engagements ever fought on Canadian soil.

=== Failed siege ===
Lévis was, however, unable to retake Quebec. The British retreated behind the city's walls, and withstood Lévis' feeble siege until the arrival of naval reinforcements in May. The French fleet never arrived, because France's naval hopes were smashed at Quiberon Bay the previous fall and the few supply ships sent from France were lost in the Bay of Chaleur in the Battle of Restigouche. HMS Lowestoffe raised her flag as she neared Quebec followed by HMS Diana, and HMS Vanguard under Commodore Swanton which then destroyed Levis' support ships on the Saint Lawrence. He quickly raised the siege and retreated to Montreal, where he surrendered in September to overwhelming British forces that approached the city from three directions.

== Memory ==
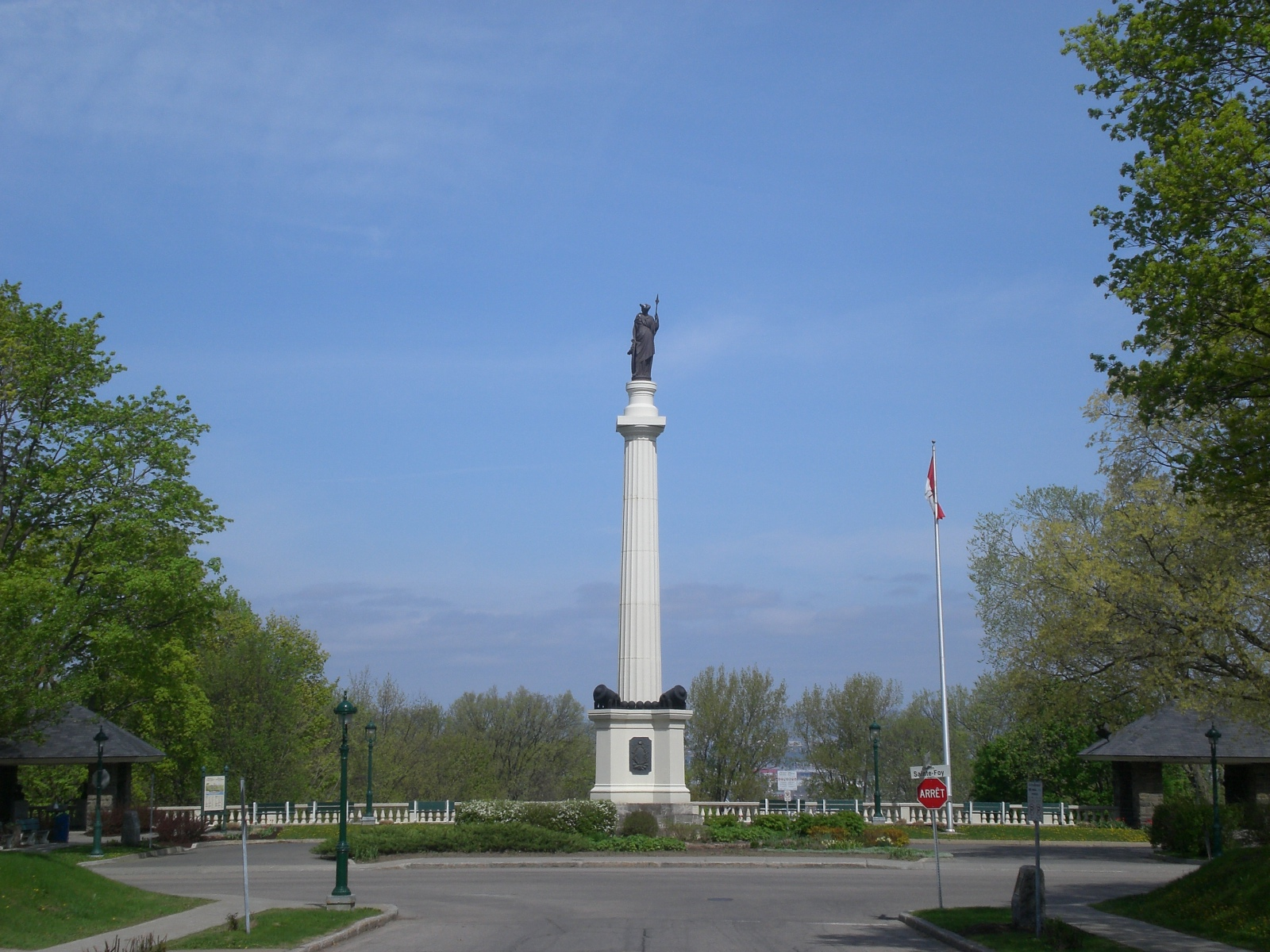
The Monument des Braves, which commemorates the Battle of St. Foy.

"The Monument des Braves," in Quebec in 1863, commemorated the Battle of Sainte-Foy. It began a wave of commemorations that took place across Canada between 1850 and 1930. They were designed to create positive memories, leave out the harshness of the British conquest, and bring Anglophones and Francophones closer together.

The battle and its aftermath, with the fruits of the French victory snatched by the arrival of British warships, was dramatized by modernist poet F. R. Scott in, "On the Terrace, Quebec":

I think of the English troops
imprisoned in the broken city
in the spring of 1760
waiting the first ship.

Whose flag would it fly?

And the other army,
victorious at Ste. Foy,
still strong,
watching.

Suddenly, round the bend,
masts and sails
begin to finger the sky.

The first question is answered.
