= Zachary Hamlyn =

English lawyer (1677-1759)

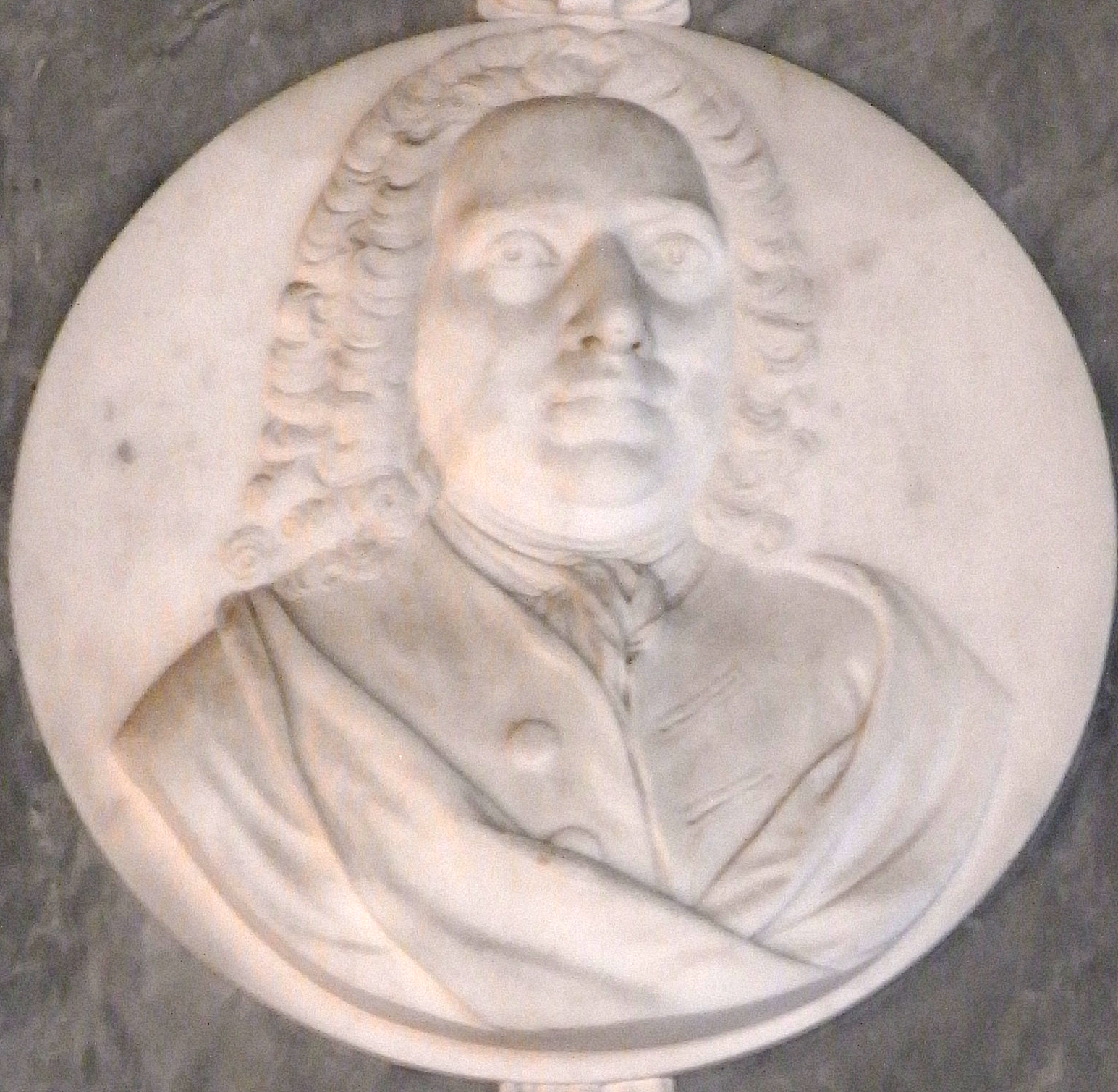
Medallion bust of Zachary Hamlyn (1677–1759) of Clovelly Court, Devon. Detail from his mural monument on north wall of north aisle, All Saints Church, Clovelly

Zachary Hamlyn (1677–1759), of Clovelly and Woolfardisworthy, three miles south-east of Clovelly, Devon, was a lawyer of Lincoln's Inn and thought to be the first Clerk of the Journals of the House of Commons. He made a large fortune and in 1738 purchased the manor of Clovelly from the last of the Cary family, longtime lords of the manor, and made Clovelly Court his residence.

== Origins ==
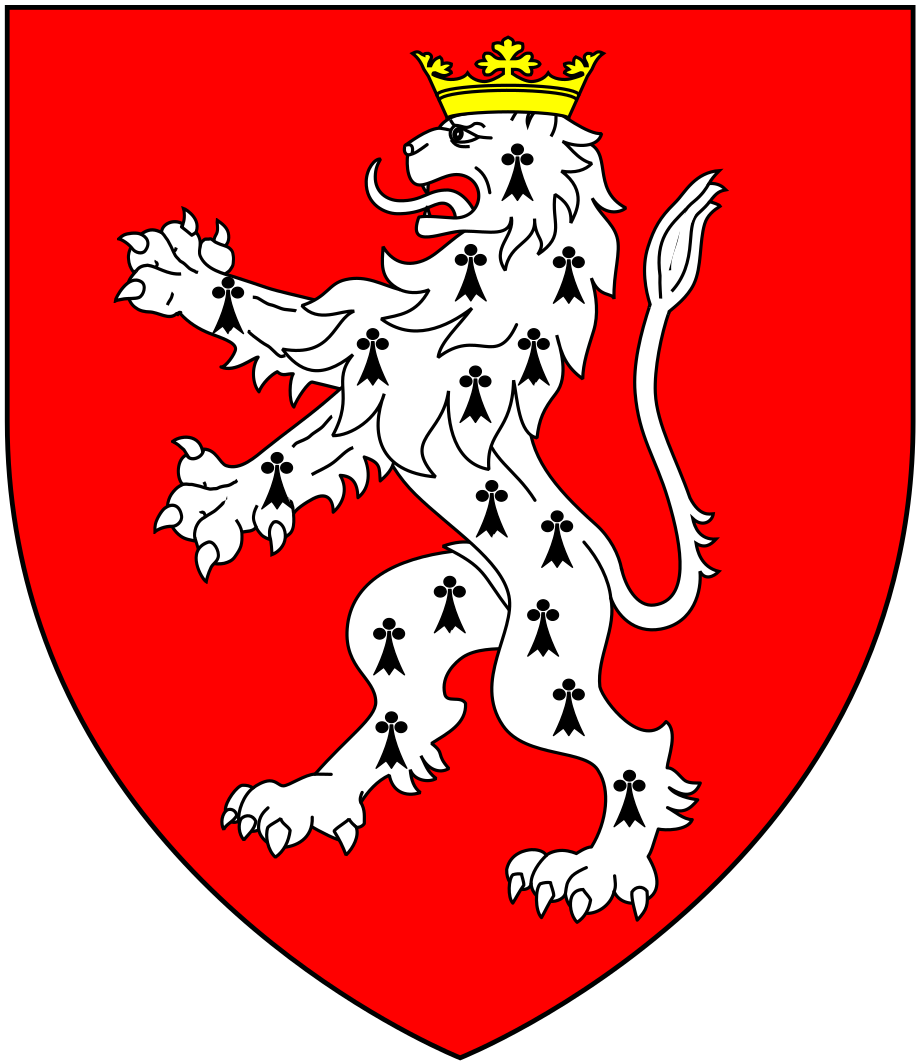
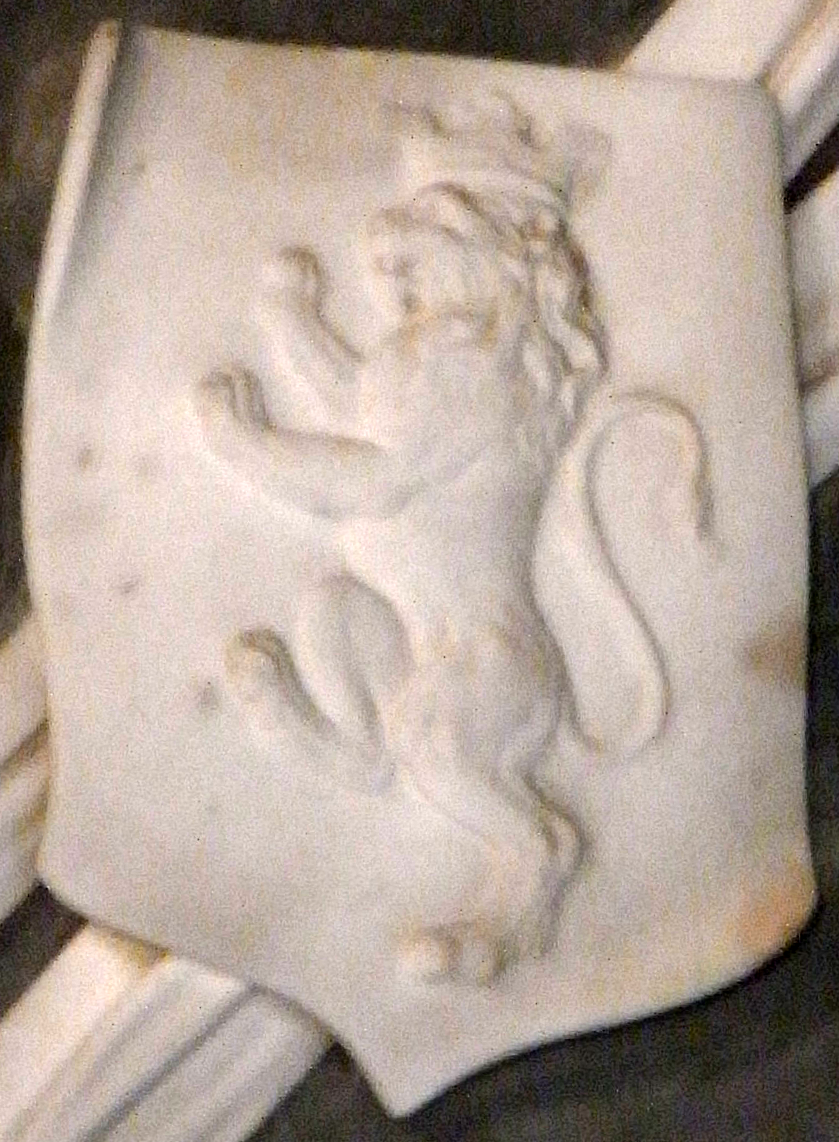
Left: Arms of Hamlyn of Widecombe and Buckfastleigh: Gules, a lion rampant ermine crowned or.; right: As shown on mural monument to Zachary Hamlyn (1677–1759) in Clovelly Church

Zachary Hamlyn was the son of William Hamlyn (junior) of Mershwell (alias Marshfield), in the parish of Woolfardisworthy, Devon, by his wife Gertrude Cary (d.1697), daughter of Thomas Cary, MA, whose relationship, if any, to the Carys of Clovelly is not recorded. A ledger stone on the floor of the chancel in Woolfardisworthy Church is inscribed: Here lyeth Gertrude, the wife of William Hamlyn of Marshwell, in this parish, who was buried 8 December 1697.

Although Zachary was buried in the chancel of the parish church of Wolfardisworthy, his mural monument is in Clovelly Church. A fine painting of him by Joseph Highmore (1692-1780) was destroyed in the fire at Clovelly Court in 1789, but an engraving of it (but possibly of his friend the author Samuel Richardson) by James MacArdell (c.1729–1765) exists in the National Portrait Gallery. A relief sculpted portrait bust exists on his mural monument in Clovelly Church. (See full text on Wikisource of s:Last Will and Testament of Zachary Hamlyn). Zachary Hamlyn's sister Thomazine Hamlyn married Richard Hammett, and had an eldest son Richard Hammett, husband of Elizabeth Risdon and father of James Hammett, his eldest son.

== Ancestry ==
Surviving sources do not enable Zachary Hamlyn's origins to be connected to the ancient Devonshire gentry family of Hamlyn of Widecombe and Buckfastleigh, resident at Widecombe in 1522 and still at Buckfastleigh in the late 19th century. However, the arms of the Hamlyn family of Widecombe and Buckfastleigh (Gules, a lion rampant ermine crowned or), appear on the monument to Zachary Hamlyn in Clovelly Church. The Hamlyn family is believed to have descended from Hamelin, the Domesday Book tenant in 1086 of two manors (Alwington and Broad Hempston) under the Norman magnate Robert, Count of Mortain (d.1090), half-brother of King William the Conqueror. He may have been the same Hamelin who also held two manors in Cornwall from the same overlord. Sir John Hamlyn, of Larkbeare, in the parish of St Leonard, Exeter, father of Sir Osbert, was at the Battle of Bouroughbridge in 1322, and his arms are recorded on the roll of arms of the Knights present: Gules, a lion rampant ermine, crowned or.

According to Worthy (1892), the branch of the family "which long flourished in much repute in Woolfardisworthy" seems to have descended from John Hamlyn, fourth son of Richard Hamlyn, of Widecombe, and brother to Robert and Thomas, paternal and maternal ancestors of the Hamlyn family resident at Buckfastleigh in 1892. The first Hamlyn of Woolfardisworthy was William Hamlyn of Mershwell, whose arms, as previously blazoned, were on two shields in painted glass in one of the windows at Mershwell, with the date 1540. William Hamlyn was born in 1540, and was buried at Woolfardisworthy in 1597. By his wife, Agnes Yeo, of Stratton, he had a son, William, whose son William, of Mershwell, was baptised at Woolfardisworthy, on the 21st day of October 1579. His son, William Hamlyn, married Gertrude Cary, and was buried in 1708. He had issue by her fourteen children, and at his death his son Zachary Hamlyn succeeded to Mershwell. Zachary recorded his pedigree at the College of Arms but did not carry it further back than the William Hamlyn who was buried at Woolfardisworthy in 1597.

== Death ==
Zachary Hamlyn died on 22 June 1759, aged 82. As requested in his will, he was buried in the chancel of the parish church of Wolfardisworthy, but his mural monument is in Clovelly Church. A fine painting of him by Joseph Highmore (1692–1780) was destroyed in the fire at Clovelly Court in 1789, but an engraving of it (but possibly of his friend the author Samuel Richardson) by James MacArdell (c.1729–1765) exists in the National Portrait Gallery. A relief sculpted portrait bust exists on his mural monument in Clovelly Church.

(See full text on Wikisource of s:Last Will and Testament of Zachary Hamlyn).

== Succession ==
Zachary Hamlyn died unmarried and without progeny. He designated as his heir to Clovelly and to his other estates, his great-nephew James Hammett (1735–1811), who following the terms of the bequest, in 1760 by Act of Parliament (33 Geo. 2. c. 15), adopted the arms and surname Hamlyn in lieu of his patronymic. In 1795 he was created a baronet, and thus became known as Sir James Hamlyn, 1st Baronet. He also inherited the estate of Edwinsford in Carmarthenshire from his wife and served as Member of Parliament for Carmarthen 1793–1802, and as Sheriff of Devon 1767-8.

Zachary Hamlyn's sister Thomazine Hamlyn had married Richard Hammett of Kennerland in the parish of Clovelly, and had an eldest son Richard Hammett, husband of Elizabeth Risdon and father of James Hammett, his eldest son.

== Mural monument ==
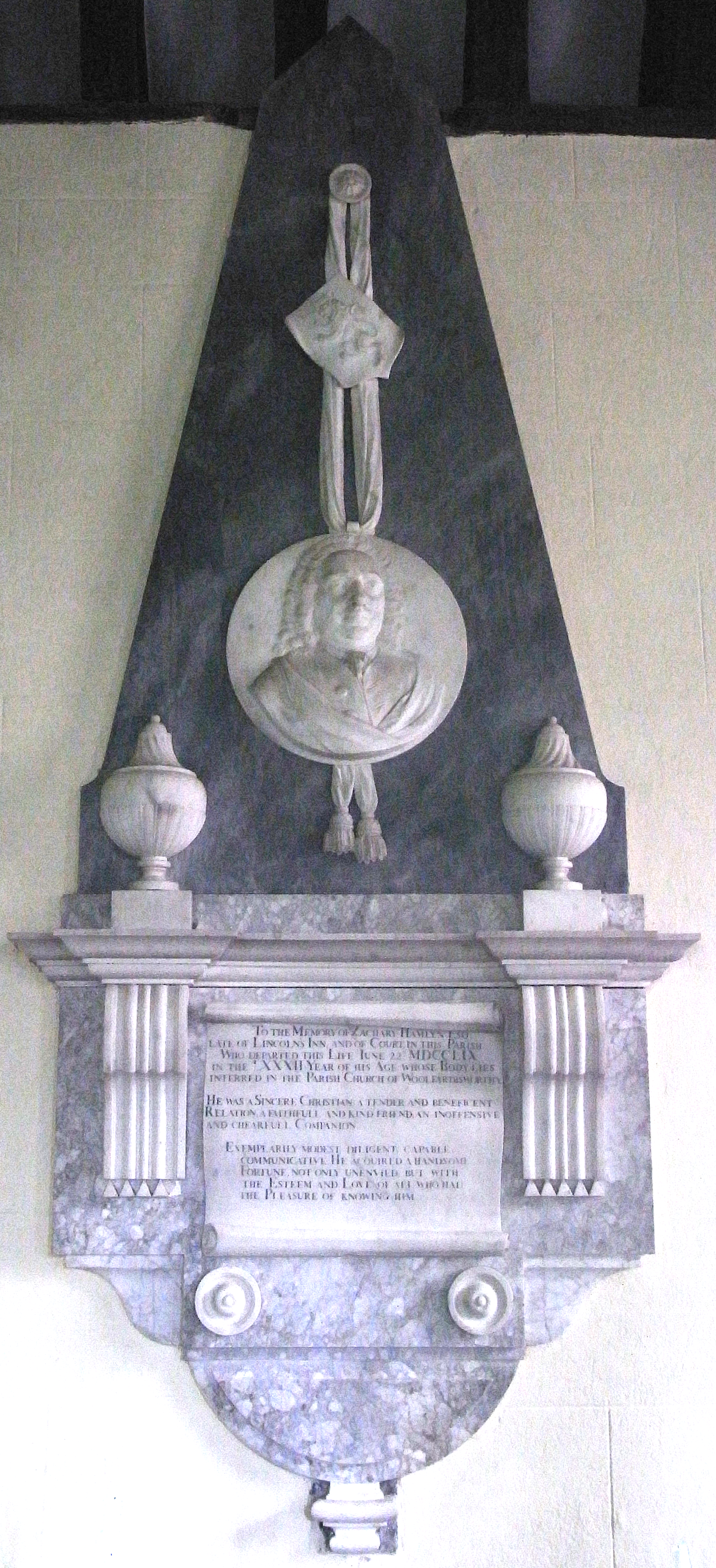
Mural monument to Zachary Hamlyn (1677–1759) of Clovelly Court, Devon. North wall of north aisle, All Saints Church, Clovelly

A mural monument to Zachary Hamlyn survives on the north wall of the north aisle of All Saints Church, Clovelly, inscribed as follows:

"To the memory of Zachary Hamlyn Esq. late of Lincoln's Inn and of Court in this parish who departed this life June 22d MDCCLIX in the LXXXII year of his age. Whose body lies interred in the parish church of Woolfardisworthy. He was a sincere Christian, a tender and beneficent relation, a faithfull and kind friend an inoffensive and chearfull companion. Exemplarily modest, diligent, capable, communicative, he acquired a handsome fortune not only unenvied but with the esteem and love of all who had the pleasure of knowing him".

Above is a medallion bust, and an escutcheon showing the arms of Hamlyn: Gules, a lion rampant ermine crowned or.

== Sources ==
- Lauder, Rosemary, Devon Families, Tiverton, 2002, pp. 131–136, Rous of Clovelly
