= Windbury Head =

Iron Age hill fort in North Devon, England

Coordinates: 51.0129°N 4.4442°W

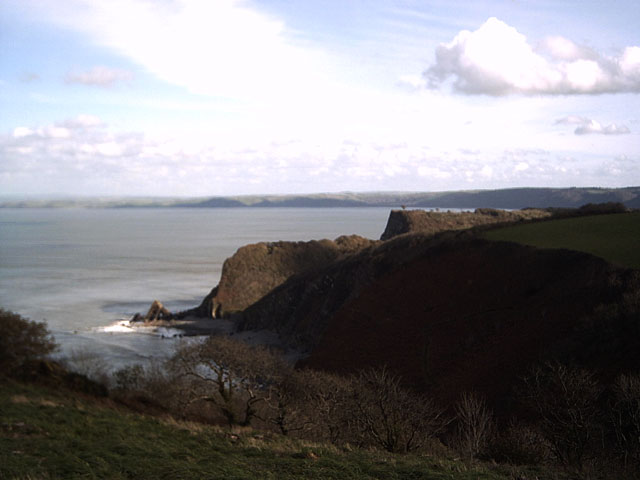
The view from Windbury Hillfort with part of the fort in the left foreground

Windbury Head is the site of an Iron Age hill fort on the Hartland Peninsula, just north of Clovelly in North Devon, England. Most of the fort has been lost to coastal erosion, but the southern ramparts still exist at approximately 100 metres (330 ft) above sea level.
