= Sir Nicholas Williams, 1st Baronet =

British politician (1641–1745)

Williams baronets
- Escutcheon of the Williams baronets of Edwinsford
- Creation date: 1707
- Status: extinct
- Extinction date: 1745
- Seat: Edwinsford
- Arms: Argent, a lion rampant Sable, face, paws and tuft of the tail of the Field.

Sir Nicholas Williams, 1st Baronet (1681 – 19 July 1745) was a British politician.

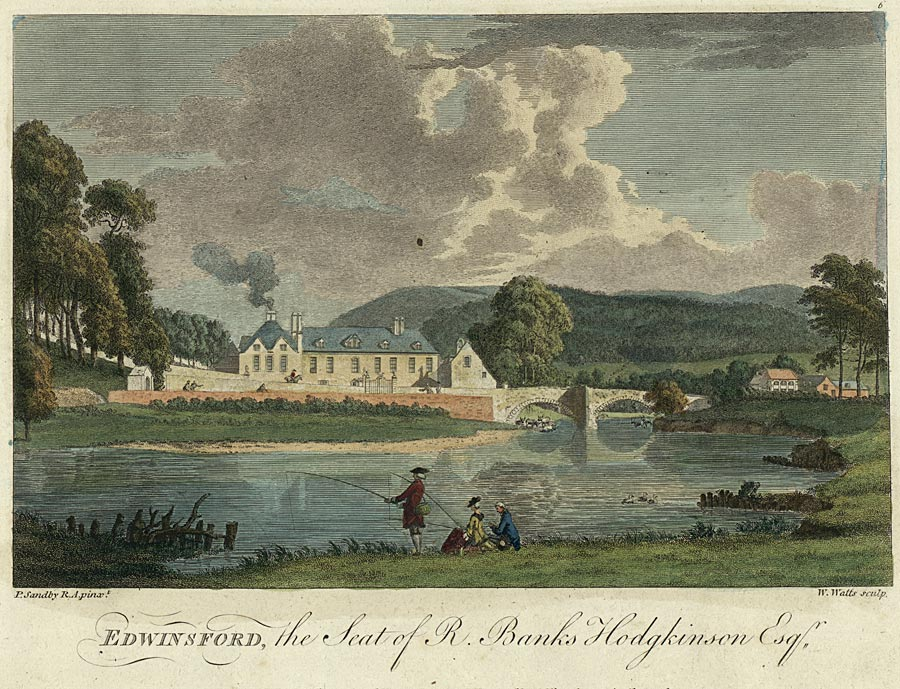
Edwinsford, Carmarthenshire

He was the eldest son of Sir Rice Williams, of Edwinsford, Carmarthenshire, by his second wife, Mary Vaughan, daughter and co-heir of John Vaughan of Llanelly. He was educated at Eton College and Queens' College, Cambridge.

He was High Sheriff of Carmarthenshire from 1697 to 1698, and was created a baronet on 30 July 1707. From 1724 until his death, he was a member of parliament for Carmarthenshire in the Parliament of Great Britain, and was Lord Lieutenant of the county from 1735 to 1740. He was a supporter of Robert Walpole.

He married Mary Cocks, the daughter of Charles Cocks and niece of John Somers, 1st Baron Somers, on 19 June 1712 at St Mildred, Poultry, London. They had no children, and the baronetcy became extinct on his death in 1745. His estate eventually devolved to the second and third Hamlyn-Williams baronets.

After his death, his brother Thomas took over as Custos Rotulorum of Carmarthenshire.

== See also ==
- Hamlyn-Williams baronets

Parliament of Great Britain
Preceded by Edward Rice	Member of Parliament for Carmarthenshire; 1724–1745	Succeeded by John Vaughan
Baronetage of Great Britain
New creation	Baronet (of Edwinsford); 1707–1745	Extinct
Preceded by Dashwood baronets	Williams baronets of Edwinsford; 30 July 1707	Succeeded by Goodere baronets
