= George Bryant Campion =

British artist (1795–1870)

- Born: 1795
- Died: 1 April 1870 (aged 74–75); Woolwich, UK
- Occupation: painter
- Known for: watercolour landscapes
- Notable work: Olden Times, Gathering Orach, The Battle of Sainte-Foy

George Bryant Campion (1795–1870) was an English watercolour landscape painter.

== Life ==
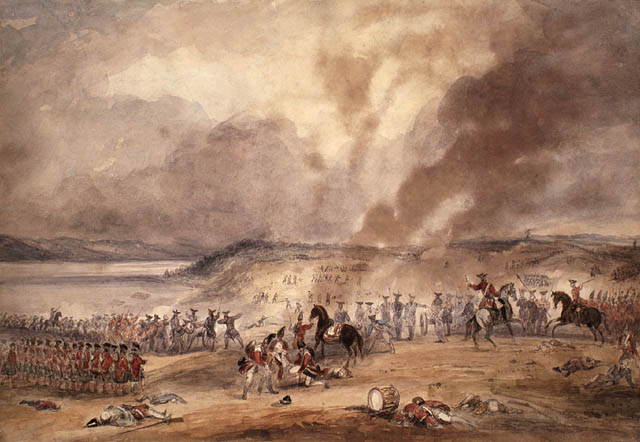
The Battle of Sainte-Foy, c. 1850s

Campion was one of the earliest members of the New Society of Painters in Water Colours, having been elected in 1837, and was a frequent contributor to the exhibitions of that society. Olden Times and Gathering Orach, both exhibited at the Institute of Painters in Water Colours (as the Society was renamed in 1863) in 1869, are fair specimens of his art. He was for some time drawing master at the Military Academy, Woolwich. Although many sites say that George Bryant Campion retired and died in Munich, he died on 1 April 1870 at Woolwich, UK. Another common mistake is that he was the author of "The Adventures of a Chamois Hunter".

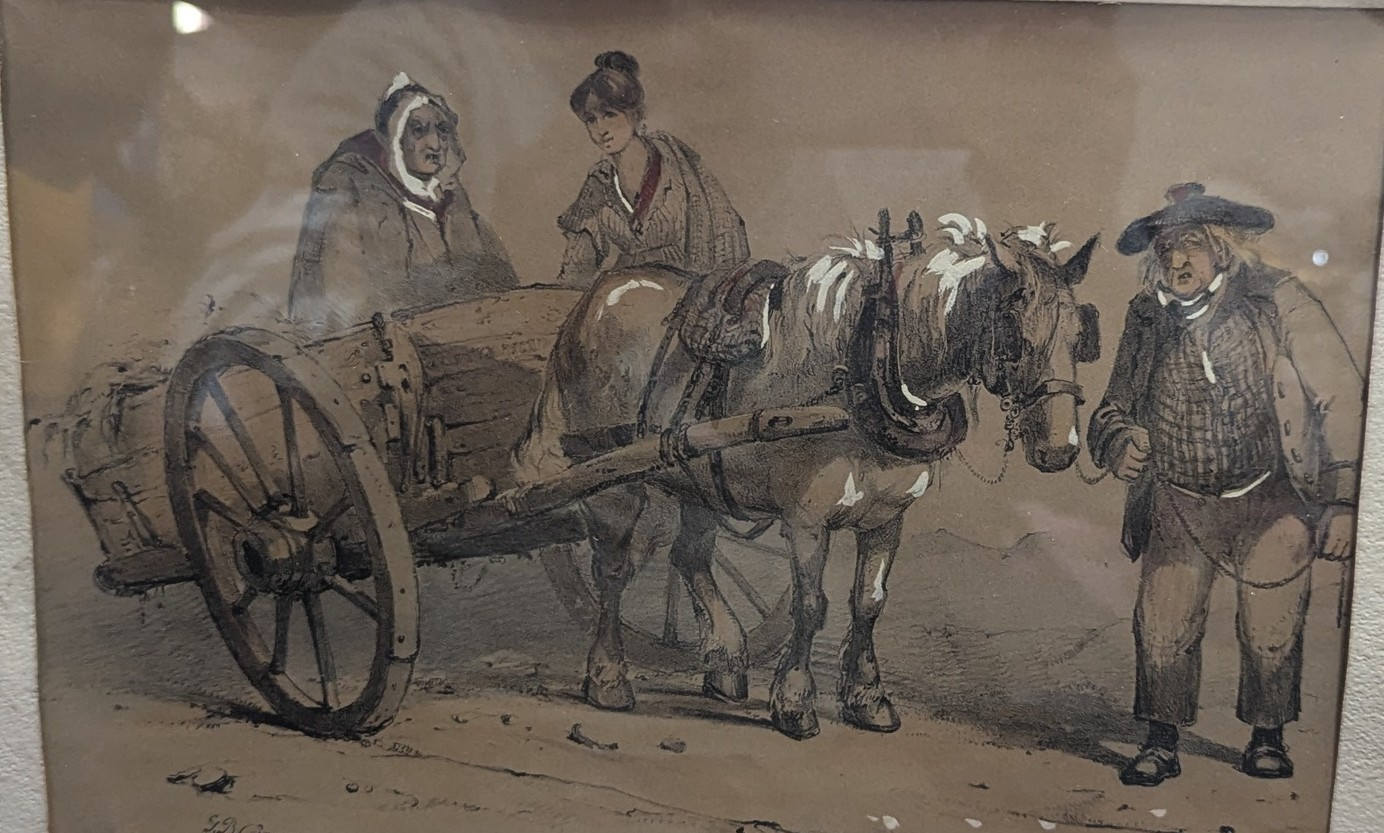
Highland Farmer by George Bryant Campion
