= Manor of Clovelly =

Historic manor in Devon, England

The Manor of Clovelly is a historic manor in North Devon, England. Within the manor are situated the manor house known as Clovelly Court, the parish church of All Saints, and the famous picturesque fishing village of Clovelly. The parish church is unusually well-filled with well-preserved monuments to the lords of the manor, of the families of Cary, Hamlyn, Fane, Manners and Asquith. In 2015 the Rous family, direct descendants via several female lines of Zachary Hamlyn the only purchaser of Clovelly since the 14th century, still own the estate or former manor, amounting to about 2,000 acres, including Clovelly Court and the advowson of the parish church, and the village of Clovelly, run as a major tourist attraction with annual paying visitor numbers of about 200,000.

== History ==
=== Normans ===
The manor of CLOVELIE was recorded in the Domesday Book of 1086 as held at some time in chief from William the Conqueror by the great Saxon nobleman Brictric, but later held by the king's wife Matilda of Flanders. According to the account by the Continuator of Wace and others, in his youth Brictric declined the romantic advances of Matilda and his great fiefdom was thereupon seized by her. Whatever the truth of the matter, years later when she was acting as Regent in England for William the Conqueror, she used her authority to confiscate Brictric's lands and threw him into prison, where he died. Most of Matilda's landholdings, including Clovelly, descended to the Honour of Gloucester.

Brictric's lands were granted after the death of Matilda in 1083 by her eldest son King William Rufus to Robert FitzHamon, the conqueror of Glamorgan, whose daughter and sole heiress Maud (or Mabel) FitzHamon brought them to her husband Robert de Caen, 1st Earl of Gloucester. Thus Brictric's fiefdom became the feudal barony of Gloucester. The Giffard family later held Clovelly as feudal tenant of the Honour of Gloucester, and the Book of Fees records Roger Giffard holding Clovelly "from the part of Earl Richard", that is Richard de Clare, 5th Earl of Hertford, 6th Earl of Gloucester, feudal baron of Gloucester. The feudal barony of Gloucester was soon absorbed into the Crown, when the Giffards became tenants in chief.

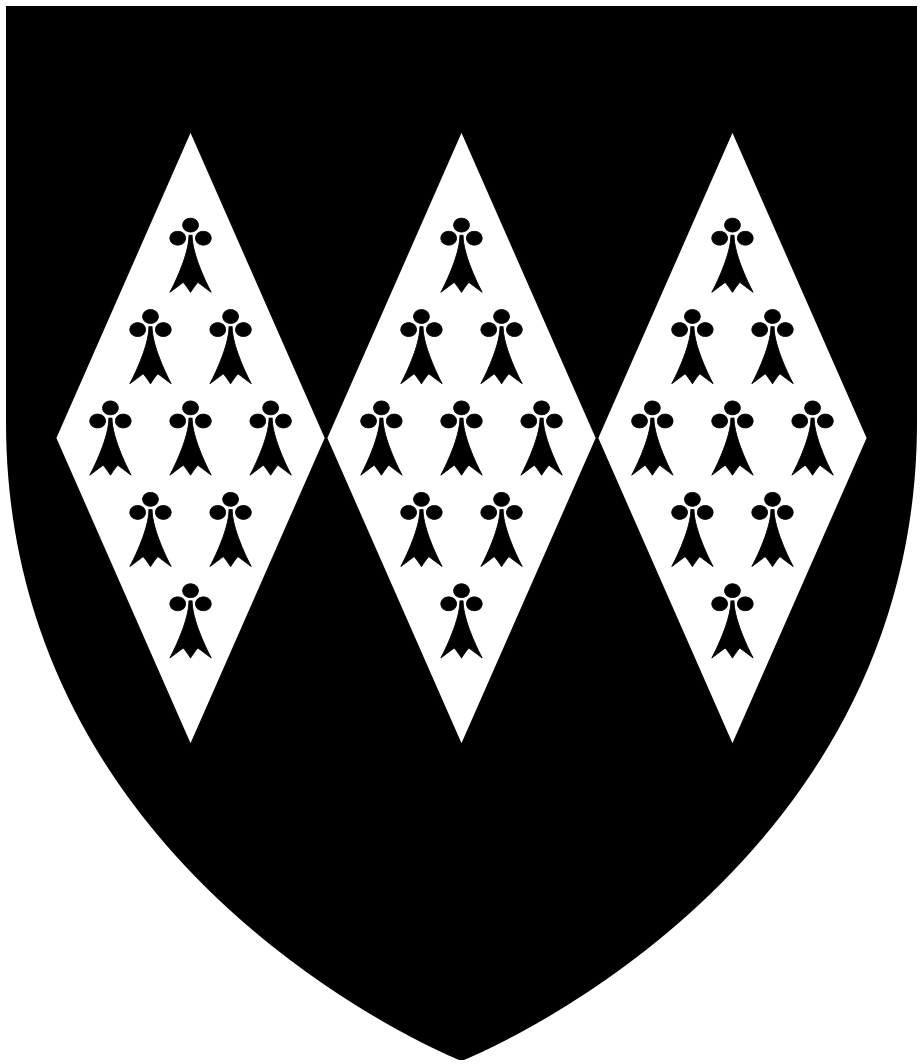
Arms of Giffard of Weare Giffard, Halsbury and Brightley, all in Devon: Sable, three fusils conjoined in fesse ermine

Roger Giffard in 1242 held Clovelly as one knight's fee from Sir Walter Giffard of Weare Giffard. His son Matthew Giffard left two daughters and co-heiresses, one married to Stanton, the other to Mandevile. Matthew Giffard presumably died before 1314 as in that year Clovelly was held jointly by John de Stanton and John Maundeville. In 1345 Clovelly was held by Sir John de Stanton and Robert Mandevill. It appears that on an eventual split of the Giffard estates Mandeville inherited Fonthill Gifford in Wiltshire whilst Stanton received Clovelly. John de Stanton left a daughter and sole heiress Matilde de Stanton, wife of John Crewkern of Childhey in Dorset. During the reign of King Richard II Clovelly was sold to Sir John Cary, as is generally accepted, although the Devon historian Thomas Westcote in his View of Devonshire suggested that the latter inherited it from his mother Margaret Bozum, daughter of Richard Bozum apparently of the family seated at Bozum's Hele, in the parish if Dittisham, Devon.

=== Cary ===
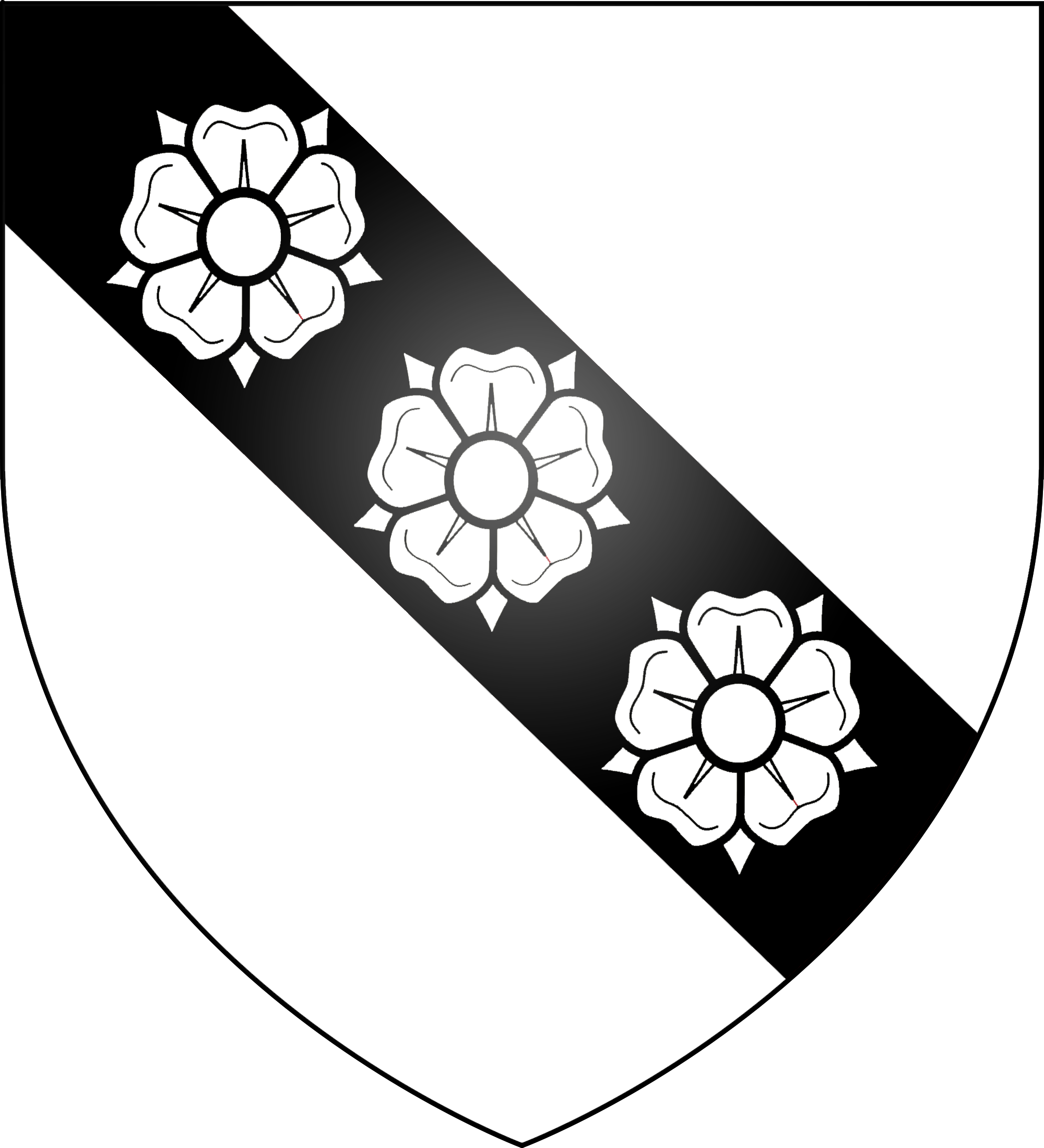
Arms of Cary: Argent, on a bend sable three roses of the field

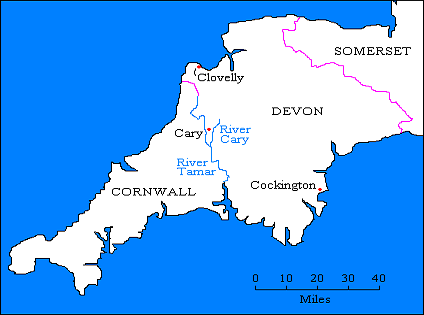
Seats of the Cary family in Devon: Cary, in the parish of St Giles in the Heath, next to the River Cary; Clovelly and Cockington, the latter both purchased by Sir John Cary (died 1395), Chief Baron of the Exchequer and Member of Parliament for Devon

In the 14th century, Clovely is found held by the Cary family. Sir John Cary purchased the manor but probably never lived there and certainly died in exile in Ireland. At some time after 1350 the Cary family acquired the manor of Cockington, in Devon, which they made their principal seat. Certainly according to Pole, Robert Cary held Cockington during the reign of King Henry IV. It then passed to Sir Philip Cary, of Cockington, eldest son and heir, by his father's first wife.

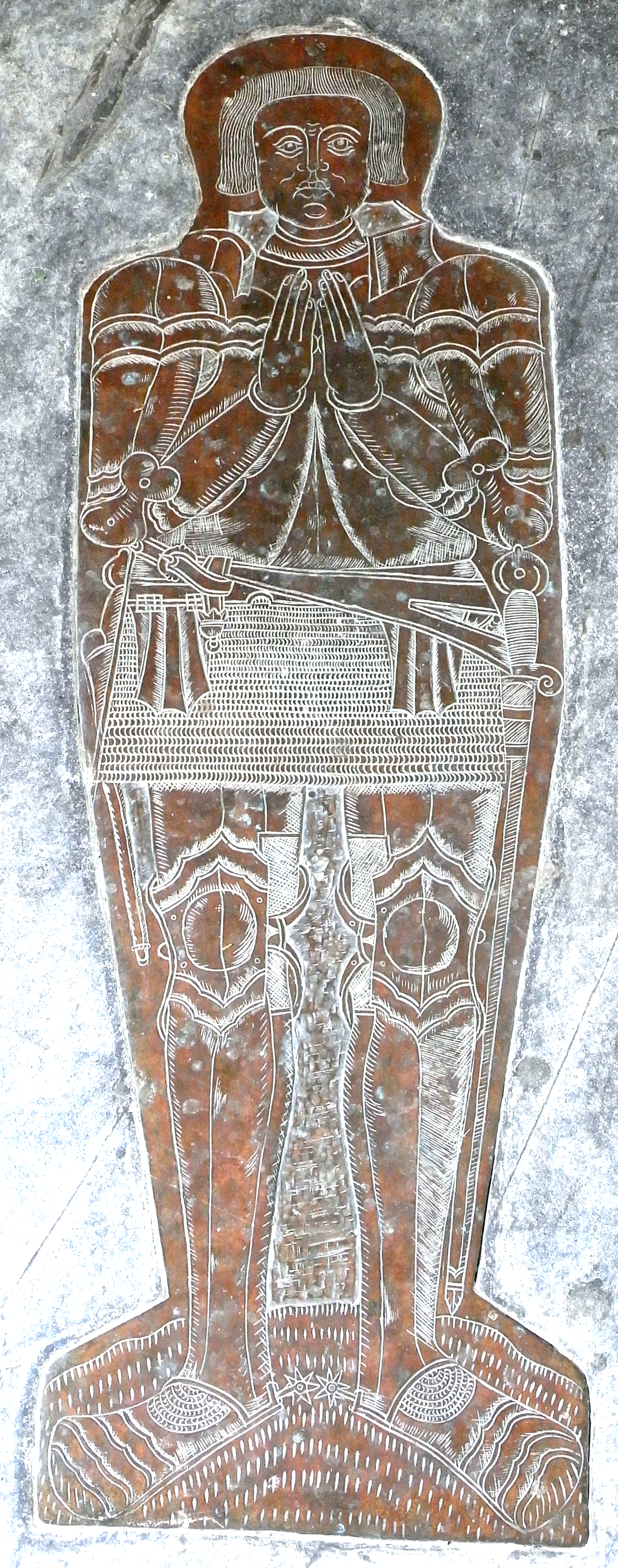
Monumental brass believed to represent Sir William Cary (1437–1471), lord of the manors of Clovelly and Cockington, Devon. Set into a slate ledger stone in floor of chancel, All Saints Church, Clovelly, without identifying inscription or armorials, next to brass of his son and heir Robert Cary (died 1540)

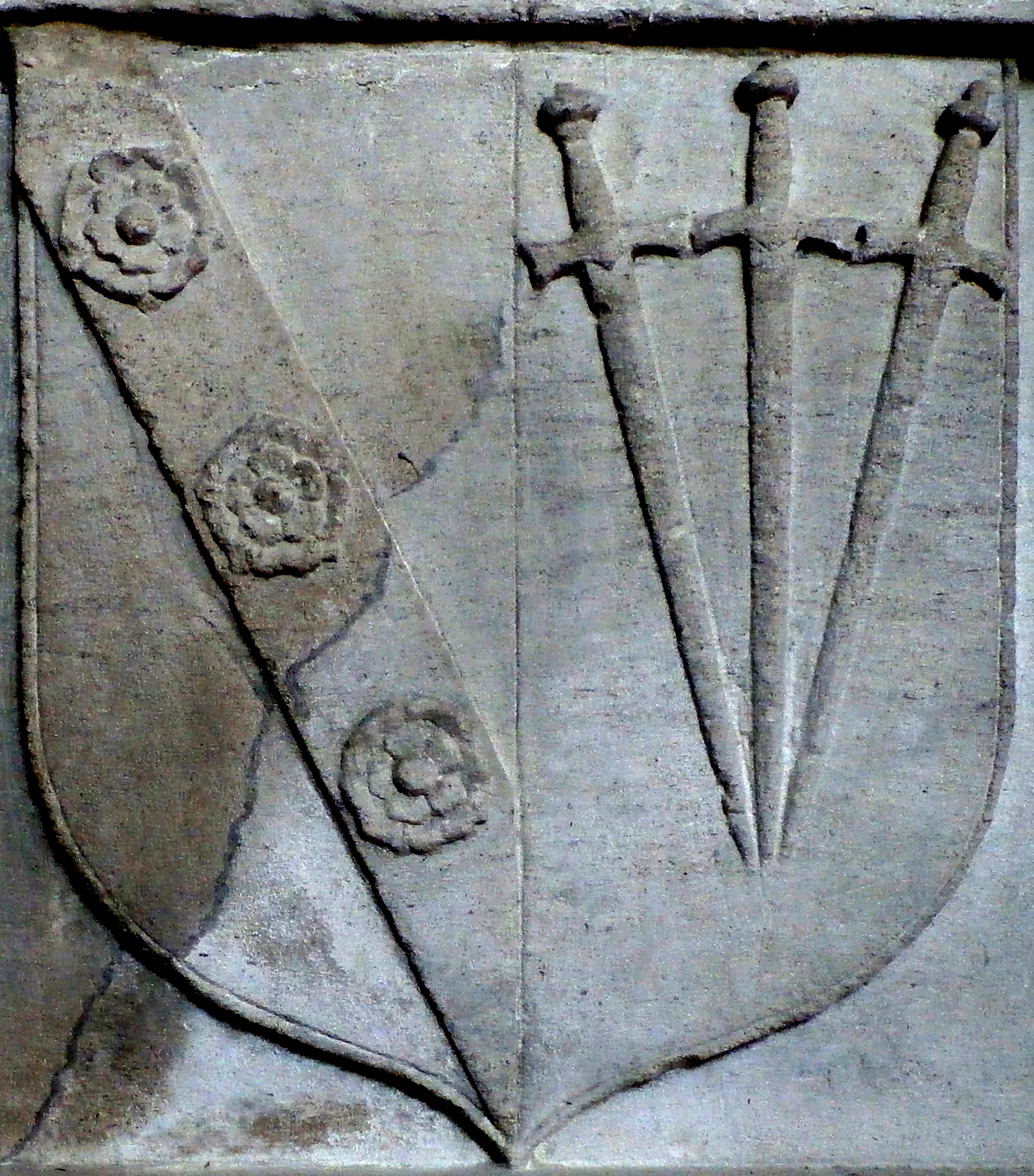
Arms of Sir William Cary (1437–1471), as seen on the base of the monument in Clovelly Church of his grandson Robert Cary (died 1586), showing Cary impaling Sable, three swords pilewise points in base proper pomels and hilts or (Poulett)

Sir William Cary was beheaded after the defeat of the Lancastrians at the Battle of Tewkesbury in 1471. He is believed to be represented by a monumental brass of a knight, without surviving identifying inscription, set into a slate ledger stone on the floor of the chancel of All Saints Church, Clovelly, next to a smaller brass, in similar style, of his son and heir Robert Cary. Robert's monumental brass, showing a bare-headed knight dressed in full armour and standing in prayer, survives with its inscription, set into a ledger stone on the floor of the chancel of All Saints Church at Clovelly. The inscription reads:

Praye for the soule of Master Robert Cary Esquier sonne & heyer of Sur Will'm Cary, Knyght, whiche Robert decessyd the XVth day of June i(n) the yere of o(u)r Lord God MVCXL o(n) whos sowle J(es)hu have m(er)cy

Robert Cary was given Clovelly by his father. He was the first Cary to be seated exclusively at Clovelly, the manors of Cary and Cockington having been inherited by his half-brothers. He served as Recorder of Barnstaple after 1560. He was a magistrate and along with several other members of the Devonshire gentry then serving as magistrates he died of gaol fever at the Black Assize of Exeter 1586. His large monument, with strapwork decoration, survives against the south wall of the chancel of All Saints Church, Clovelly. Along the full length of the cornice is inscribed in gilt capitals: Robertus Carius, Armiger, obiit An(no) Do(mini) 1586 ("Robert Cary, Esquire, died in the year of Our Lord 1586"). On the base of the north side are shown two relief sculpted heraldic escutcheons, showing Cary impaling Chequy argent and sable, a fess vairy argent and gules (Fulkeram, for his father) and Cary impaling Sable, three swords pilewise points in base proper pomels and hilts or (Poulett, for his grandfather). On the base of the west side is a similar escutcheon showing his own arms of Cary (of four quarters, 1st: Cary; 2nd: Or, three piles in point azure (Bryan); 3rd: Gules, a fess between three crescents argent (Holleway); 4th: A chevron (unknown, possibly Hankford: Sable, a chevron barry nebuly argent and gules) impaling Gules, a chevron or between three millets hauriant argent (Milliton)

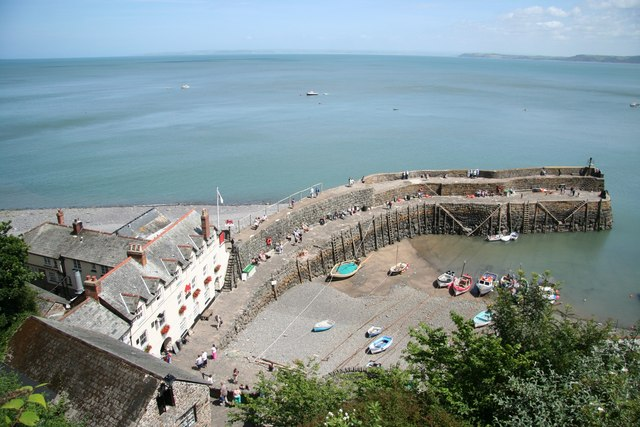
The "Pile" or harbour wall at Clovelly built by George Cary (1543–1601), which created the only safe anchorage between Appledore and Boscastle

George Cary (1543–1601) constructed at Clovelly a harbour wall, surviving today, described by Risdon as "a pile to resist the inrushing of the sea's violent breach, that ships and boats may with the more safety harbour there". Clovelly's main export product was herring fish, which formerly appeared at certain times of the year in huge shoals, close off-shore in the shallow waters of the Bristol Channel, and such a harbour wall was a great benefit to the village fishermen, tenants of the Cary lords of the manor. His monumental brass survives in Clovelly Church in the form of a ledger stone on the floor of the chancel, inset into which is an inscribed brass tablet and below which in the 1860s was added into an empty matrix a reproduction large monumental brass in the form of a bishop's crozier. It is unclear what relevance such an object might have to him and when the original brass which once filled the matrix was removed or robbed.

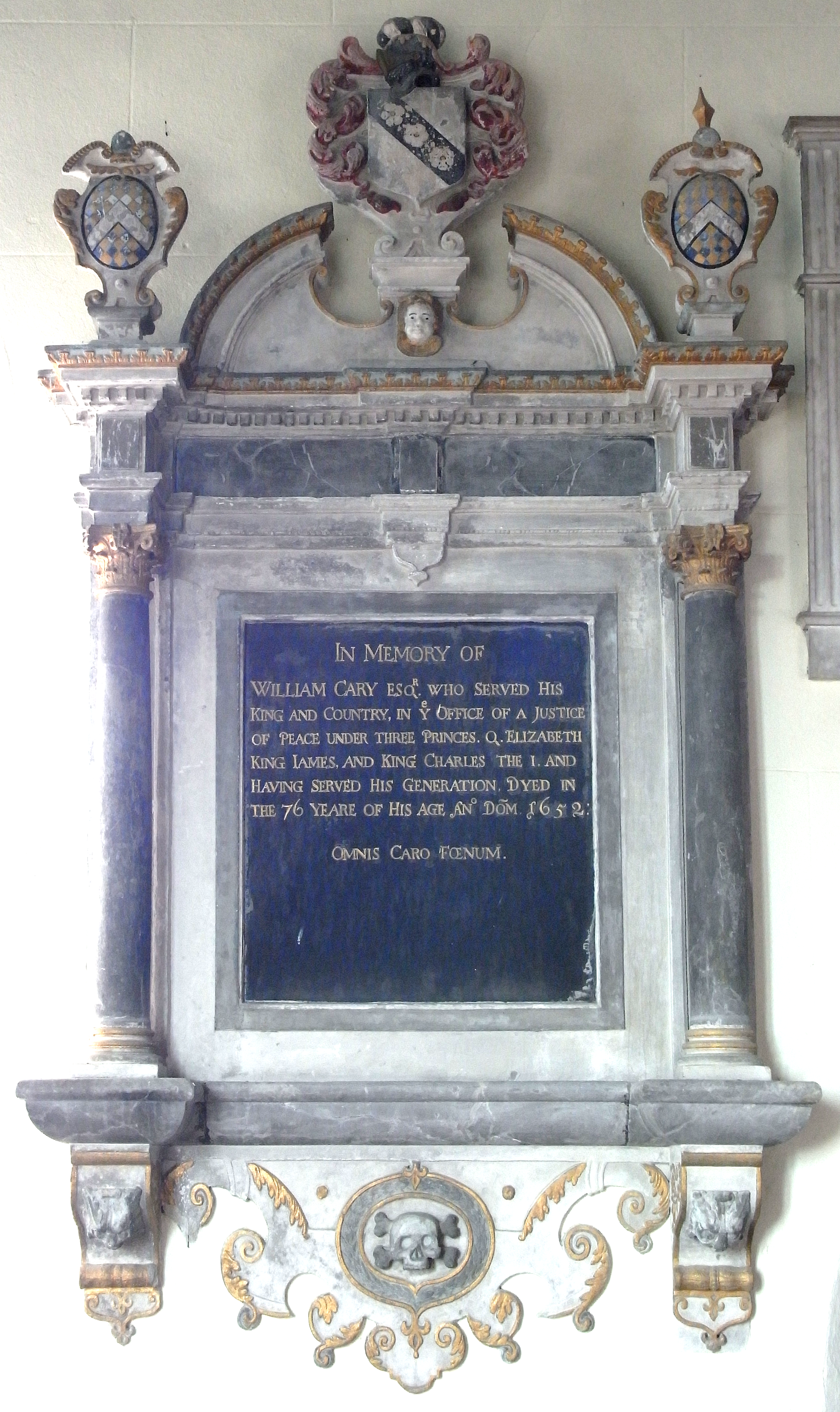
Mural monument to William Cary (1576–1652), All Saints Church, Clovelly

William Cary (1576–1652) is sometimes said to be the model for Will Cary featured in Westward Ho!, the 1855 novel by Charles Kingsley, who appears in the narrative concerning the Spanish Armada in 1588, although he would have been a boy aged just 12 at the time. However the "daring foreign exploits attributed to him are entirely fictional". Kingsley spent much of his childhood at Clovelly as his father was Rev. Charles Kingsley, Curate of Clovelly 1826–1832 and Rector 1832–1836. Indeed, the author's small brass monumental tablet is affixed to the wall of the church under the mural monument of Sir Robert Cary, eldest son of William. His mural monument survives on the south chancel wall of Clovelly Church, erected by his second son and eventual heir George (who erected a similar one also opposite on the north chancel wall to his elder brother Sir Robert), inscribed as follows:

"In memory of William Cary Esq^{r} who served his king and country in ye office of a Justice of Peace under three princes, Q. Elizabeth, King James and King Charles the I and having served his generation dyed in the 76 yeare of his age An^{o} Dom 1652: Omnis Caro Foenum".

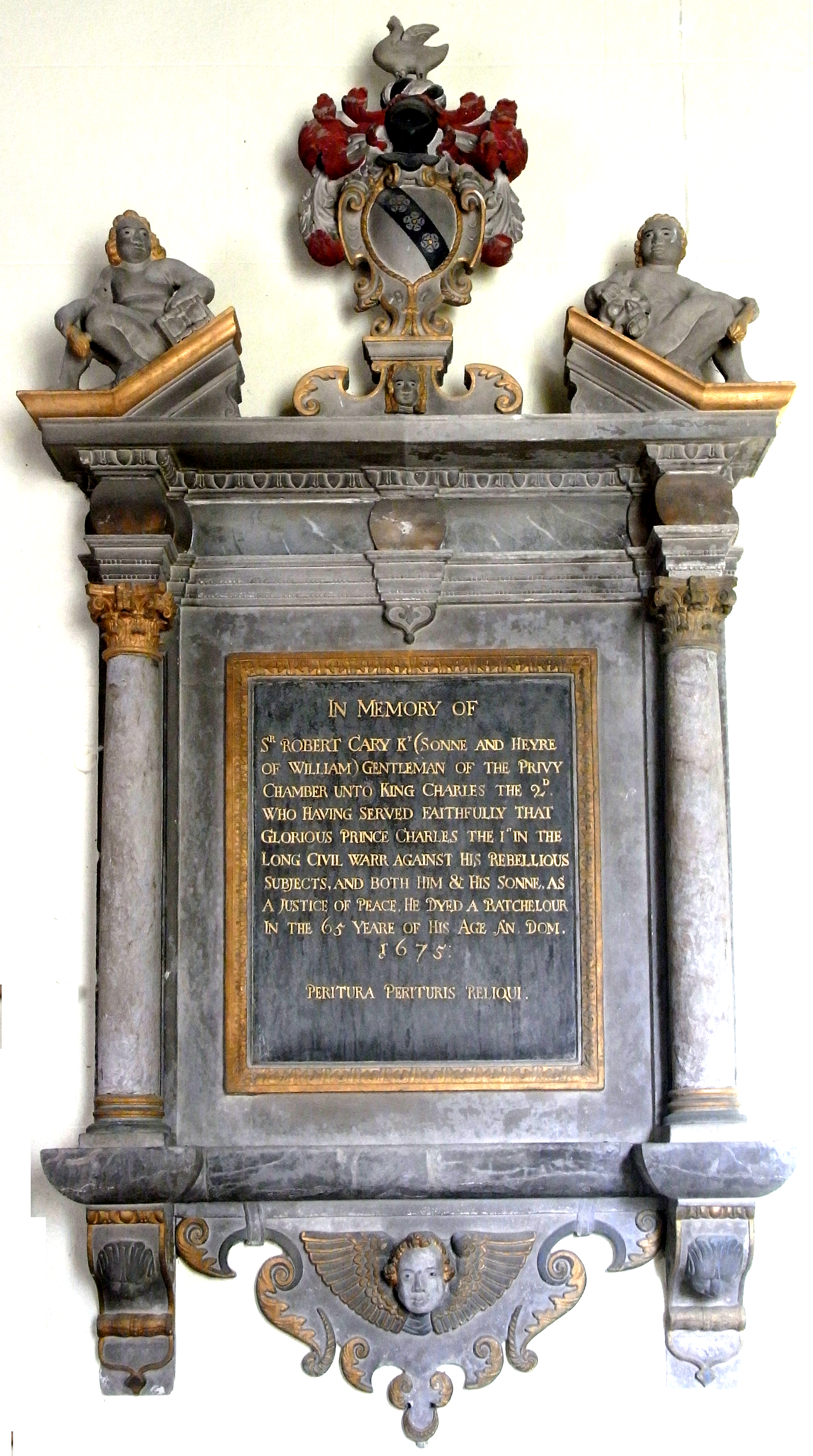
Mural monument to Sir Robert Cary (1610–1675), All Saints Church, Clovelly, north wall of chancel

Sir Robert Cary (1610–1675) died unmarried and without children. His mural monument survives in Clovelly Church, erected by his younger brother and heir George Cary (1611–1680) and inscribed as follows:

"In memory of S^{r} Robert Cary K^{t} (sonne and heyre of William) Gentleman of the Privy Chamber unto King Charles the 2^{d} who having served faithfully that glorious prince, Charles the I^{st}, in the long Civil Warr against his rebellious subjects, and both him and his sonne as a Justice of Peace, he dyed a batchelour in the 65 yeare of his age An. Dom. 1675. Peritura Perituris Reliqui".

Doctor George Cary (1611-1680), younger brother, was a Professor (Doctor) of Divinity, Dean of Exeter (amongst other duties responsible for the maintenance and decoration of the cathedral building) and Rector of Shobrooke in Devon. He was one of the Worthies of Devon of John Prince (died 1723). His first clerical appointment was by his father as Rector of Clovelly. During most of his career he lived about 44 miles south-east of Clovelly, at Exeter, and at Shobrooke, near Crediton, 9 miles to the north-west of Exeter. Indeed, it appears that until about 1702 Clovelly was occupied by his second cousins, the three brothers John Cary, George Cary (died 1702) and Anthony Cary (died 1694), sons of Robert Cary of Yeo Vale, Alwington, near Clovelly. He rebuilt the rectory house at Shobrooke, which he found in a dilapidated state and made it "a commodious and gentile dwelling". He also rebuilt the "ruinous,...filthy and loathsome" Dean's House in Exeter, which during the Civil War had been let to negligent tenants by the See of Exeter, and "in a short time so well repaired, so thoroughly cleansed and so richly furnished this house that it became a fit receptacle for princes". As the Emperor Augustus with the City of Rome, so did Dean Cary with the Dean's House in Exeter "found it ruines but he left it a palace", as Prince suggests. Indeed, King Charles II stayed there on the night of 23 July 1670, having visited the newly built Citadel in Plymouth. It was also the chosen abode of Christopher Monck, 2nd Duke of Albemarle, Lord lieutenant of Devon, for three weeks in 1675 and again during the Monmouth Rebellion. He was a liberal benefactor in assisting the Corporation of Exeter in the completion in 1699 of the cutting of a leat between Exeter Quay and Topsham, which fed into a pool which could shelter 100 ships. He twice refused offers of the Bishopric of Exeter made by King Charles II, on vacancies arising in 1666 and 1676. The reason for his first refusal, or profession of Nolo Episcopari, is unknown, but he refused the second time due to age and infirmity which would prevent him attending Parliament as would be required. He died at Shobrooke but was buried in Cloveely Church. His mural monument survives in Clovelly Church, erected by his eldest son Sir George Cary (1654–1685), the armorials of the latter's two wives appearing on the top of the monument as follows: dexter: Azure, a chevron between three mullets pierced or (Davie of Canonteign, Christow); sinister: Or, a lion reguardant sable langued gules (Jenkyn of Cornwall).

Sir George Cary (1654–1685), eldest son and heir. He was knighted by King Charles II during his father's lifetime and in 1681 served as Member of Parliament for Okehampton, Devon, and occupied the honourable position of Recorder of Okehampton. His mural monument survives in Clovelly Church, with arms of Cary above, inscribed thus:

"In memory of S^{r} George Cary K^{t} sonne and heire of D^{r} George Cary Dean of Exon who dyed the 6th day of Jan^{ry} in the 31 year of his age An^{o} Dom 1684/5. Ne amemines vitam quam si in bonis accenseret numen justis non raperet". (Do not .... life, .... God would not seize away the Just if he had not counted them amongst the Good)

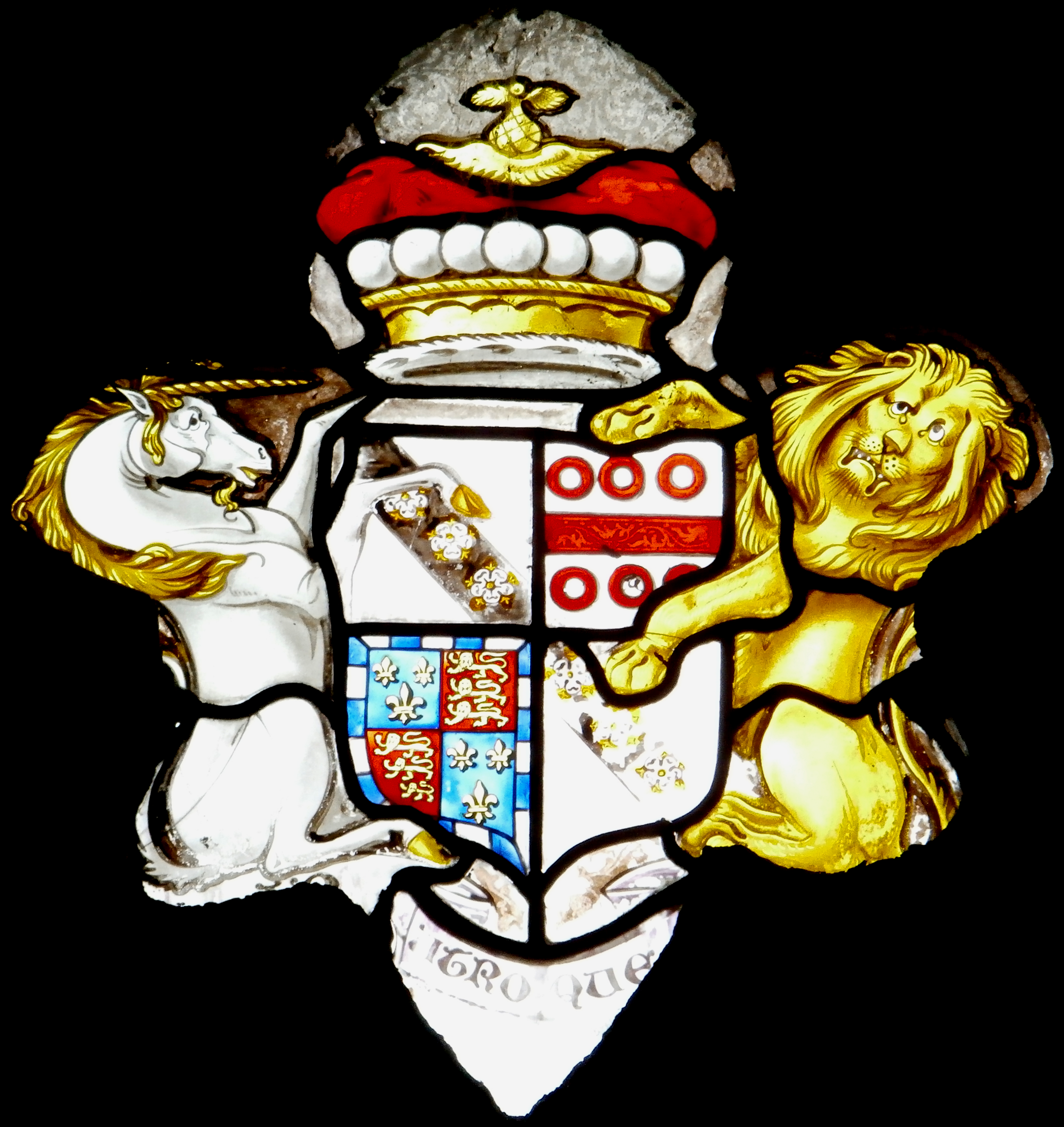
Stained glass heraldic achievement of Lucius Henry Cary, 6th Viscount Falkland (1687–1730), south chancel window, All Saints Church, Clovelly. His distant cousin Elizabeth Cary, the last of the Cary family of Clovelly, died in 1738 and the manor was sold by her husband Robert Barber in 1739. There is no reason to suppose that Cary arms were affixed inside the church after that date

William Cary (c. 1661 – 1710), younger brother, twice Member of Parliament for Okehampton in Devon 1685–1687 and 1689–1695 and also for Launceston in Cornwall 1695–1710. His mural monument survives in Clovelly Church. In 1704 he obtained a private act of Parliament, Carey's Estate Act 1703 (2 & 3 Ann. c. 33 Pr.), to allow him to sell entailed lands in Somerset and to re-settle his Devon estates in order to pay debts and provide incomes for his younger children. He was suffering financial difficulties and applied to Robert Harley for a lucrative government post to restore his finances:

"...by 16 or 17 years of war my estate, which mostly lies near the sea, has felt more than ordinary calamities of it, and hath been lessened in its income beyond most of my neighbours living in the inland country, and that a considerable jointure upon it, and four small children and the Act of Parliament procured last session for dismembering it, are motives which concur with my ambition to serve her Majesty".

He married twice:

- Firstly, after 1683, to Joan Wyndham (1669–1687), a daughter of Sir William Wyndham, 1st Baronet (c. 1632 – 1683) of Orchard Wyndham, Watchet, Somerset, Member of Parliament for Somerset 1656–1658 and for Taunton 1660–1679. Without issue. Her mural monument survives in Clovelly Church, showing at the top the arms of Cary impaling Wyndham: Azure, a chevron between three lion's heads erased or, which arms on escutcheons are also held by a pair of putti below. the monument is inscribed as follows:

"In memory of Joan the wife of William Cary of Clovelly Esq^{r} daughter of S^{r} William Wyndham of Orchard Wyndham in the county of Somersett, Baronett, who dyed Febr^{y} the 4th 86/7 in the 18th year of her age and lys buryed in St Decomans Church Somersett. En forma, moribus, virtutibus vere egregiam! Sed cum egregiam dicimus hic tacemus lugentes (i.e. "Behold! in her appearance, morals and virtues (she was) truly outstanding! But when we say outstanding, here we are silent, lamenting")

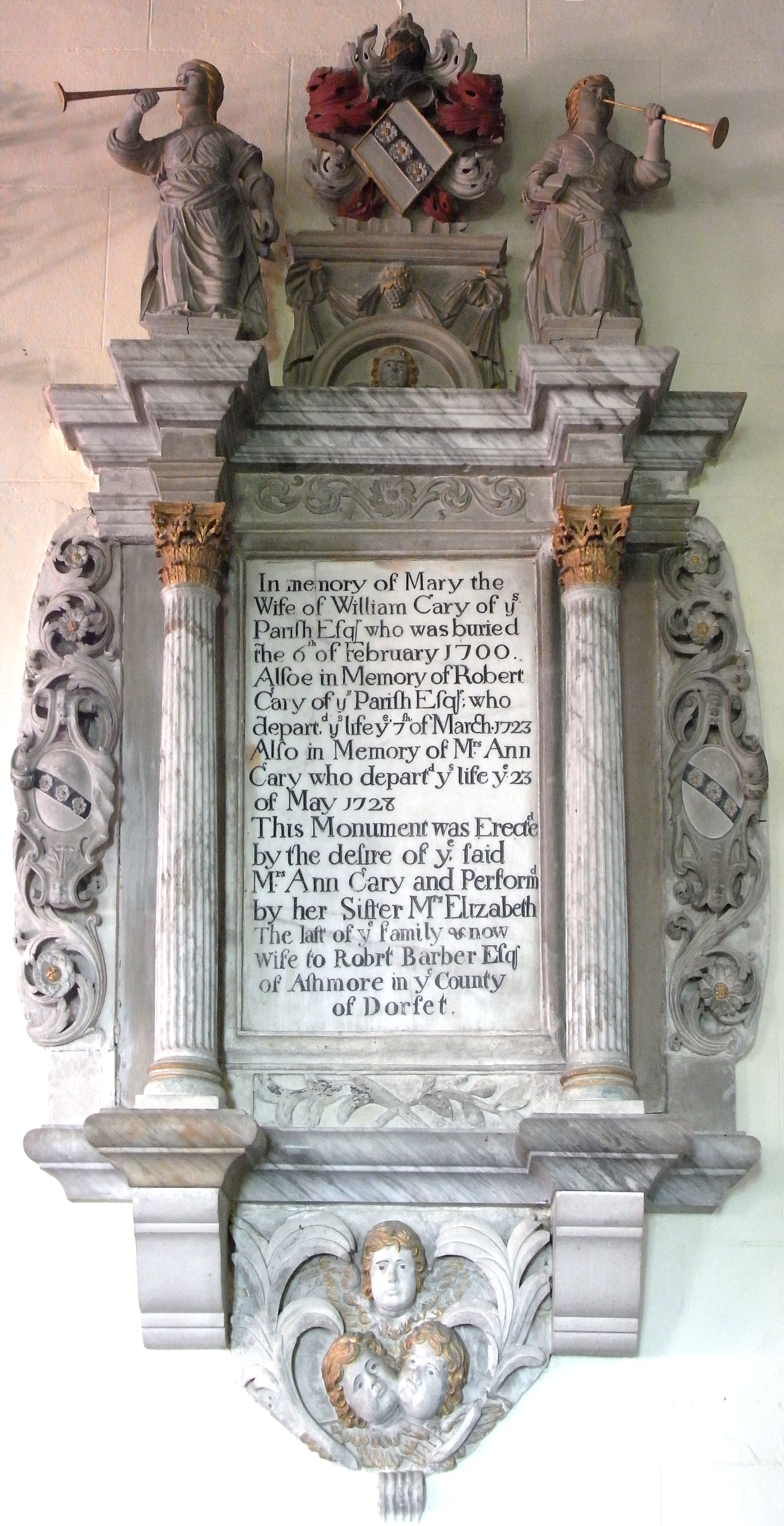
Monument in Clovelly Church to Mary Mansell (died 1700), second wife of William Cary (c. 1661 – 1710). Also to her children Robert Cary (died 1723) and Ann Cary (died 1728), by whose surviving sister, Elizabeth Cary (died 1738), the last of the Cary family of Clovelly, it was erected

- Secondly in 1694 to Mary Mansel (died 1701), daughter of Thomas Mansel of Briton Ferry, Glamorgan, MP, and sister of Thomas Mansel, MP. She brought a large dowry of £5,000. her mural monument survives in Clovelly Church inscribed as follows:

"In memory of Mary the wife of William Cary of y^{s} parish, Esq^{r} who was buried the 6th of February 1700. Also in memory of Robert Cary of y^{s} parish Esq^{r} who depart^{d} y^{s} life y^{e} 7th of March 1723. Als in memory of M^{rs} Ann Cary who depart^{d} y^{s} life y^{e} 23 of May 1728. This monument was erected by the desire of y^{e} said M^{rs} Ann Cary and perform^{d} by her sister M^{rs} Elizabeth the last of y^{e} family & now wife to Rob'rt Barber Esq of Ashmore in y^{e} county of Dorset"

By Mary Mansel he had children 3 sons and 2 daughters, which generation was the last of the Cary family of Clovelly:

  - Robert Cary (1698–1724), eldest son, who died aged 26. His ledger stone slab survives on the floor of the chancel of Clovelly Church. He is also mentioned on the monument to his mother in Clovelly Church.
  - William Cary (1698–1724), died aged 26.
  - George Cary (1701–1701), 3rd son, died an infant.
  - Ann Cary (1695–1728), eldest daughter, died unmarried aged 33. Her ledger stone slab survives on the floor of the chancel of Clovelly Church. She is also mentioned on the monument to her mother in Clovelly Church.
  - Elizabeth Cary (1699–1738), youngest daughter, wife of Robert Barber (died 1758) of Ashmore in Dorset, by whom she had issue 2 sons and 4 daughters. She was the last of the Carys of Clovelly, which manor was sold in 1739, one year after her death, to Zachary Hamlyn. Her mural monument, a marble tablet, survives in St Nicholas's Church, Ashmore, (now in the vestry, formerly on the north wall) inscribed as follows:

"In memory of Elizabeth, wife of Robert Barber of Ashmore, in the county of Dorset, Esq., by whom she left two sons, viz. : Robert Cary Barber and Jacob; and four daughters, viz. : Ann, Elizabeth, Lucy and Molly. She was daughter of William Cary of Clovelly, in the county of Devon, Esq. He was member of Parliament for Launceston, in the county of Cornwall. His first wife was Joan, aunt to the present Sir Will. Windham. His second wife Mary, daughter of Thomas Mansell of Britton Ferry, in the county of Glamorgan, Esq., nearly related to Lord Mansell. She was the last of the family of the Carys of Clovelly aforesaid, who descend from the ancient branch of the noble family of which was and are Cary Lord Hunsdon, Cary Lord Faulkland, Cary Lord Lepington and Monmouth, Sir Robert and Sir George Cary. She died in May 1738".

A space is left for the day of her death, which has never been filled in. She was not buried at Ashmore. On the monument are shown the arms of Barber (Argent, two chevrons between three cinquefoils gules) with inescutcheon of pretence of Cary.

== Sources ==
- Vivian, Lt.Col. J.L., (Ed.) The Visitations of the County of Devon: Comprising the Heralds' Visitations of 1531, 1564 & 1620, Exeter, 1895, pp. 150–9, pedigree of Cary
- Lauder, Rosemary, Devon Families, Tiverton, 2002, pp. 131–6, Rous of Clovelly
- Griggs, William, A Guide to All Saints Church, Clovelly, first published 1980, Revised Version 2010
