= Clovelly Court =

Country house in Clovelly, Devon, England

Coordinates: 51.0008°N 4.4097°W

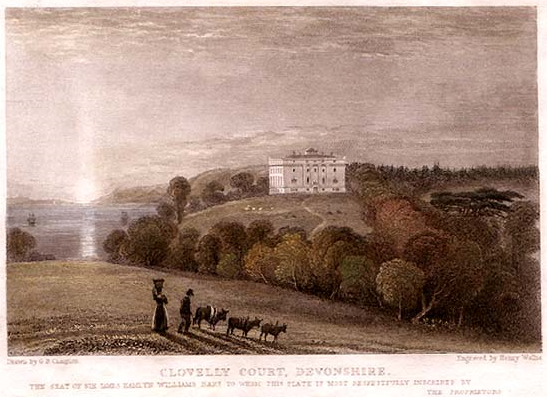
Clovelly Court in 1831

Clovelly Court is a privately owned country house in Clovelly, Devon. The house and adjacent stable block are Grade II listed buildings. The gardens and parts of the estate are open to the public.

== History ==
The manor of Clovelly was for over 600 years owned by the Cary family but in 1738 the estate was sold to locally born Lincoln's Inn lawyer Zachary Hamlyn (1677-1759). He rebuilt the old manor house in 1740, but this was burnt down in 1789 and rebuilt in the Gothic style by his successor. On his death he left the property to his great-nephew James Hammet (1735–1811) who changed his name to Hamlyn. He married Arabella Williams, a Carmarthenshire heiress, and was created a baronet in 1795 (see Hamlyn-Williams baronets). In that year he carried out substantial improvements to the house.

The 4,600-acre estate passed on the death of the 3rd and last baronet in 1861 to his son Neville and then following his early death to the baronet's eldest daughter Susan Hester Hamlyn-Williams who married Henry Fane, creating the Hamlyn-Fane family.

The house and estate remain in the family and are managed by the Hon. John Rous (born 1950), great-great-grandson of Susan Hester Hamlyn-Fane, great-grandson of Prime Minister H. H. Asquith and son of the 5th Earl of Stradbroke.

== All Saints Church ==
The parish church of Clovelly, dedicated to All Saints, is located immediately to the west of the manor house, and thus at a considerable distance from the village of Clovelly. It contains many mural monuments and monumental brasses to the Cary family, longtime lords of the manor, and to their successors the Hamlyns and Hamlyn-Fanes. Most of the stained glass windows are 19th century, but some small fragments of ancient stained glass are set into the north chancel window, displaying the arms of Berkeley and Newburgh Earl of Warwick (without the ermine cheveron).

== See also ==
- Manor of Clovelly
