= SS Empire Caicos =

World War II merchant ship of the United Kingdom

History
- Name: Empire Caicos (1945-50); Sugar Transporter (1950-57); Pattawilya (1957-62); Clovelly (1962-67)
- Owner: Ministry of War Transport (1945-50); Silvertown Services Ltd (1950-57); J Paterson & Co (Pty) Ltd (1957-61); McIlwraith McEacharn (1961-62); Cronulla Shipping Co Ltd (1962-63); San Jeronimo Steamship Co Ltd (1963-67)
- Operator: H Hogarth & Sons Ltd (1945-46); Rodney Steamship Co Ltd (1946-50); R S Dalgleish Ltd (1950-53); Kentships Ltd (1953-57); J Paterson & Co (Pty) Ltd (1957-62); J Manners & Co Ltd (1962-63); San Jeronimo Steamship Co Ltd (1963-67))
- Port of registry: (United Kingdom) West Hartlepool (1945-46); (United Kingdom) London (1946-57); (Australia) Melbourne (1957-62); (United Kingdom) Hong Kong (1962-63); Panama City (1963-67)
- Builder: William Gray & Co. Ltd.
- Launched: 28 February 1945
- Completed: March 1945
- Identification: United Kingdom Official Number 180082 (1945-57); Code Letters GFDY (1945-50)
- Fate: Scrapped 1967

General characteristics
- Tonnage: 3,533 gross register tons (GRT); 2,250 NRT
- Length: 315 ft 5 in (96.14 m)
- Beam: 46 ft 5 in (14.15 m)
- Depth: 22 ft 1 in (6.73 m)
- Installed power: Triple expansion steam engine
- Propulsion: Screw propeller
- Speed: 10 knots (19 km/h)

Empire Caicos was a 3,533 GRT cargo ship which was built in 1945 for the Ministry of War Transport (MoWT). She was sold in 1946 and renamed Sugar Transporter. In 1957 she was sold and renamed Pattawilya. In 1962, she was sold and renamed Clovelly, serving until she was damaged in a storm in 1967 and then scrapped later that year.

== Description ==
Empire Caicos was built by William Gray & Co. Ltd., West Hartlepool for the MoWT. She was launched on 28 February 1945 and completed in March.

The ship was 315 feet 5 inches (96.14 m) long, with a beam of 46 feet 5 inches (14.15 m) and a depth of 22 feet 1 inch (6.73 m)}. She had a GRT of 3,533 and a NRT of 2,250. She was propelled by a triple expansion steam engine which had cylinders of 20 inches (51 cm), 31 inches (79 cm) and 55 inches (140 cm) diameter by 39 inches (99 cm) stroke. The engine was built by the Central Marine Engineering Works, West Hartlepool. The engine could propel her at 10 knots (19 km/h).

== History ==
Empire Caicos was allocated the United Kingdom Official Number 180082. She used the Code Letters GFDY. She was owned by the MoWT and operated under the management of H Hogarth & Sons Ltd. In 1946, management was transferred to the Rodney Steamship Co Ltd.

In 1950, Empire Caicos was sold to Silvertown Services Ltd and renamed Sugar Transporter. She was placed under the management of R S Dalgleish Ltd, Newcastle upon Tyne. In 1953, management was transferred to Kentships Ltd. In the aftermath of Hurricane Charlie, Sugar Transporter departed Rochester, Kent for Jamaica with a cargo of 3,000 long tons (3,048 t) of cement and over 100 parcels of clothes. In 1957, Sugar Transporter was sold to J Paterson & Co (Pty) Ltd, Melbourne, Australia and renamed Pattawilya. She was used to carry cargos of coal, gypsum and limestone, as well as general cargo to the coastal ports of Australia.

In 1961 she was sold to McIlwraith, McEacharn & Co. In 1962, Pattawilya was sold to Cronulla Shipping Co Ltd, Hong Kong and renamed Clovelly. In 1963, she was sold to the San Jeronimo Steamship Co Ltd, Panama. On 6 January 1967, Clovelly was damaged in a storm and was towed in to Sasebo, Japan. She was then sold for scrap, arriving at Uchiumi on 13 May 1967.
