= Clovelly =

Village in Devon, England

Coordinates: 50.9983°N 4.3987°W

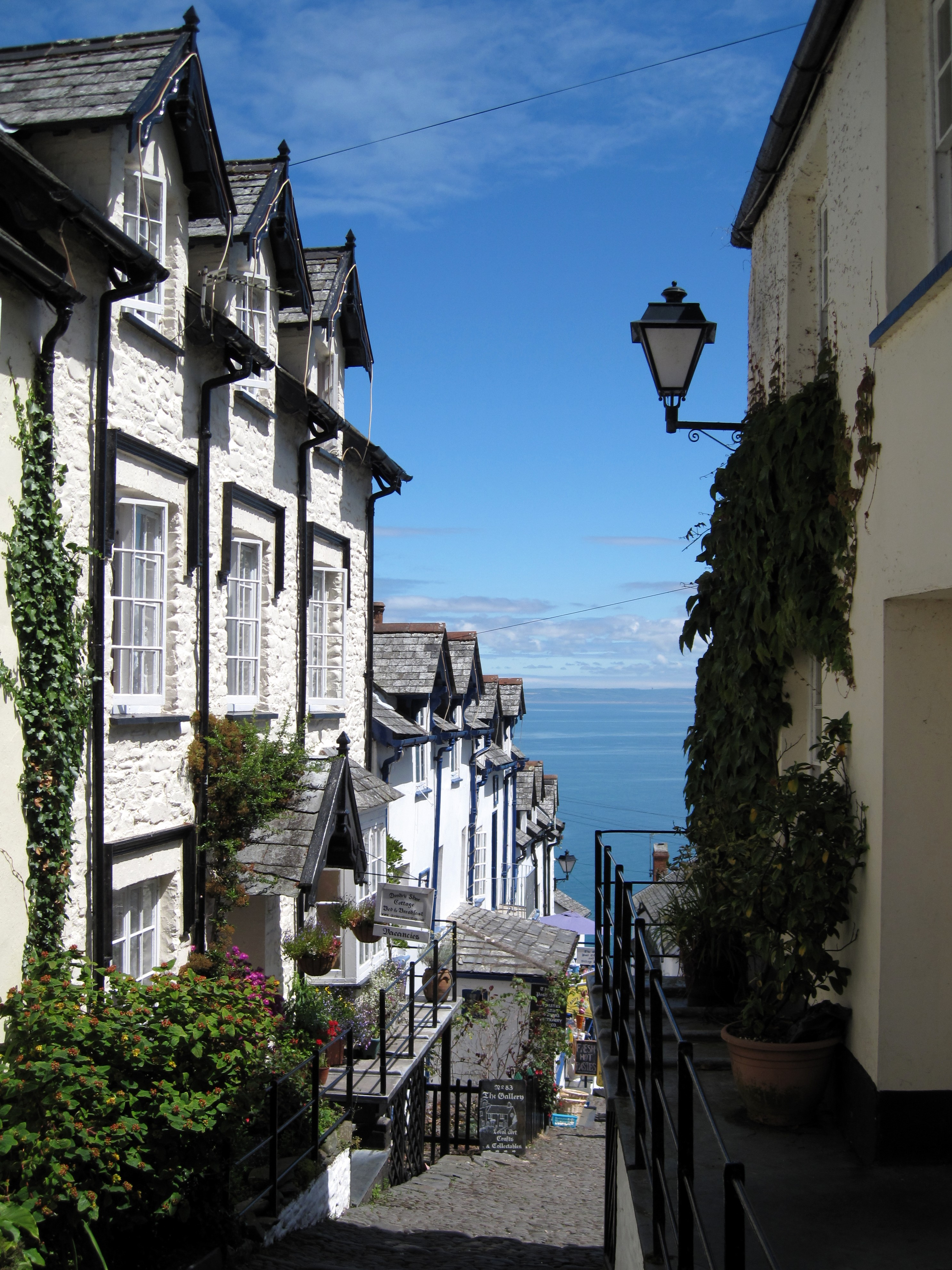
- The village sits 400 feet (120 metres) above the harbour and Bideford Bay

- Location within Devon
- Population: 443 —Whole parish (2011)
- OS grid reference: SS315245
- District: Torridge
- Shire county: Devon
- Region: South West
- Country: England
- Sovereign state: United Kingdom
- Post town: BIDEFORD
- Postcode district: EX39
- Dialling code: 01237
- Police: Devon and Cornwall
- Fire: Devon and Somerset
- Ambulance: South Western
- UK Parliament: Torridge and Tavistock

Clovelly (/kləˈvɛli/) is a privately owned harbour village in the Torridge district of Devon, England. The settlement and surrounding land belongs to John Rous, who inherited it from his mother in 1983. He belongs to the Hamlyn family, who have managed the village since 1738.

The village, which is built into the wooded sea cliffs of the north Devon shore, has a steep pedestrianised cobbled main street with architecture that was improved by Christine Hamlyn. Due to the gradients, donkeys (now mostly replaced with sledges) have been used to move goods and cargo from Clovelly Bay. Visitors to the village entering via the visitor centre are required to pay an entrance fee which covers parking, entrance to two museums, Clovelly Court gardens, and an audiovisual history guide. The village is a tourist destination and is host to an annual Lobster and Crab festival.

At the 2011 census, the parish population was 443, a decrease of 50 on the 2001 census. (Note: The ward of Clovelly Bay, which includes a neighbouring civil parish, had a total population in 2011 of 1,627, 11 greater than in 2001.) The island of Lundy is part of the electoral ward of Clovelly Bay.

== History ==
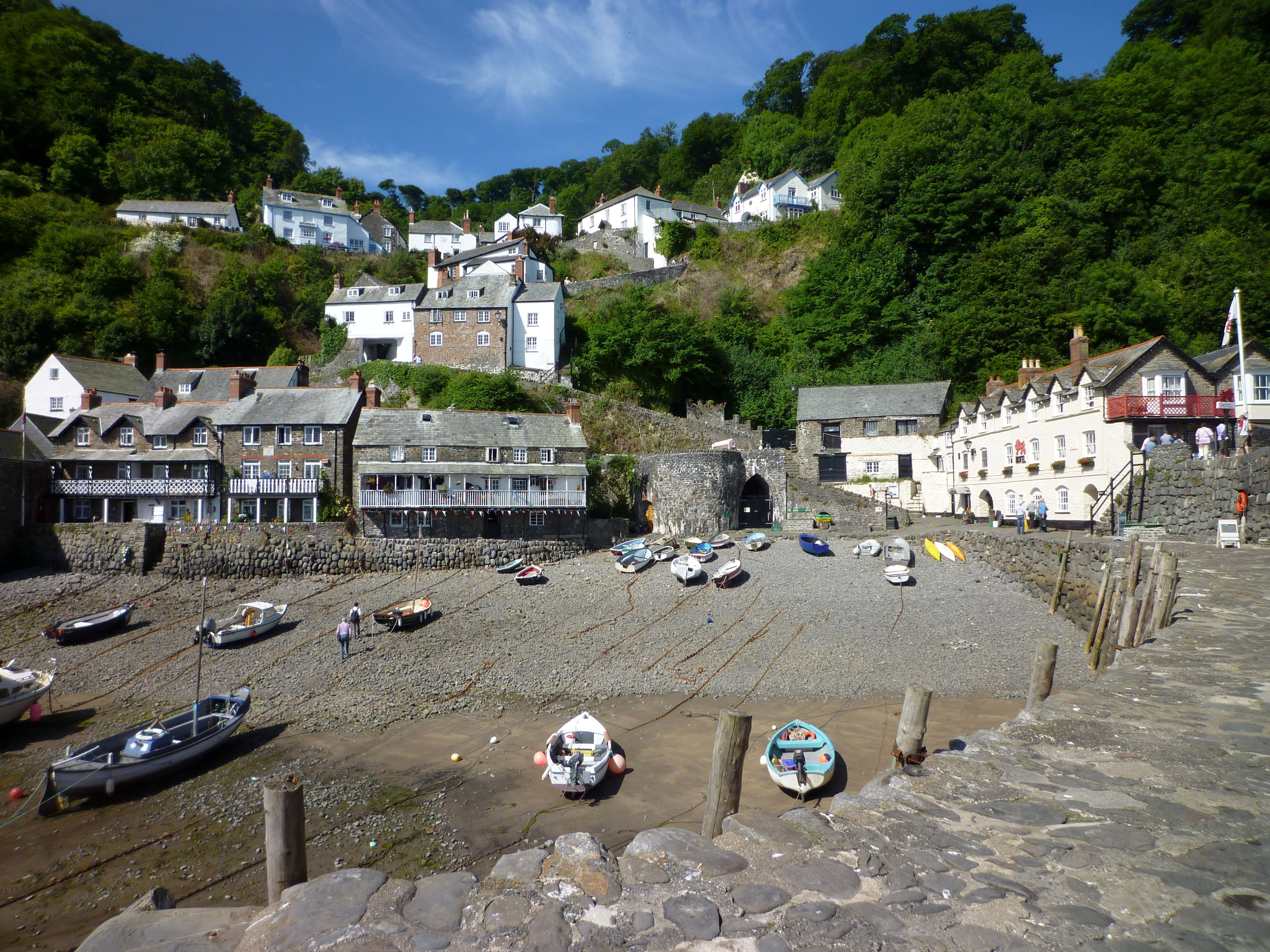
Lower part of the village, from the harbour wall

The area has had human habitation since the Iron Age; there is a hillfort at Windbury Head northwest of the village. Following the Norman Conquest of England in 1066, the Manor of Clovelly was acquired by William the Conqueror from its Saxon tenant. It was listed in the Domesday Book of 1086 as "Clovelie". William later gifted of the village to his wife Matilda of Flanders.

In the late 14th century, during the reign of Richard II, the Manor of Clovelly was bought by the judge Sir John Cary. The Church of All Saints contains several monuments to the Cary family, who remained the Lords of the Manor for another 400 years.

The village remained an agricultural parish until the late 16th century, when the squire, George Cary, had the stone breakwater erected, creating a harbour. This provided the only safe haven for ships along this stretch of the Devon coast between Appledore and Boscastle. Cary also erected fish cellars and warehouses at the cliff base and cottages along the banks of the stream that provided the only route to the shore from the plateau above. Cary spent £2,000 turning Clovelly into a fishing village.

The privately owned village has been associated with only three families since the middle of the 13th century. In 1738, the Clovelly Estate was acquired by the Hamlyn family. In 1901, the village had a population of 521.

Clovelly's preservation owes much to Christine Hamlyn, who dedicated herself to renovating and expanding the ancient cottages while beautifying the village. She built a new car park in order to keep the village car free. In the 1930s 50,000 cars were visiting each year. The village became a tourist attraction. In the 2020s the village was having 150,000 visitors each year.

=== Lifeboat station ===
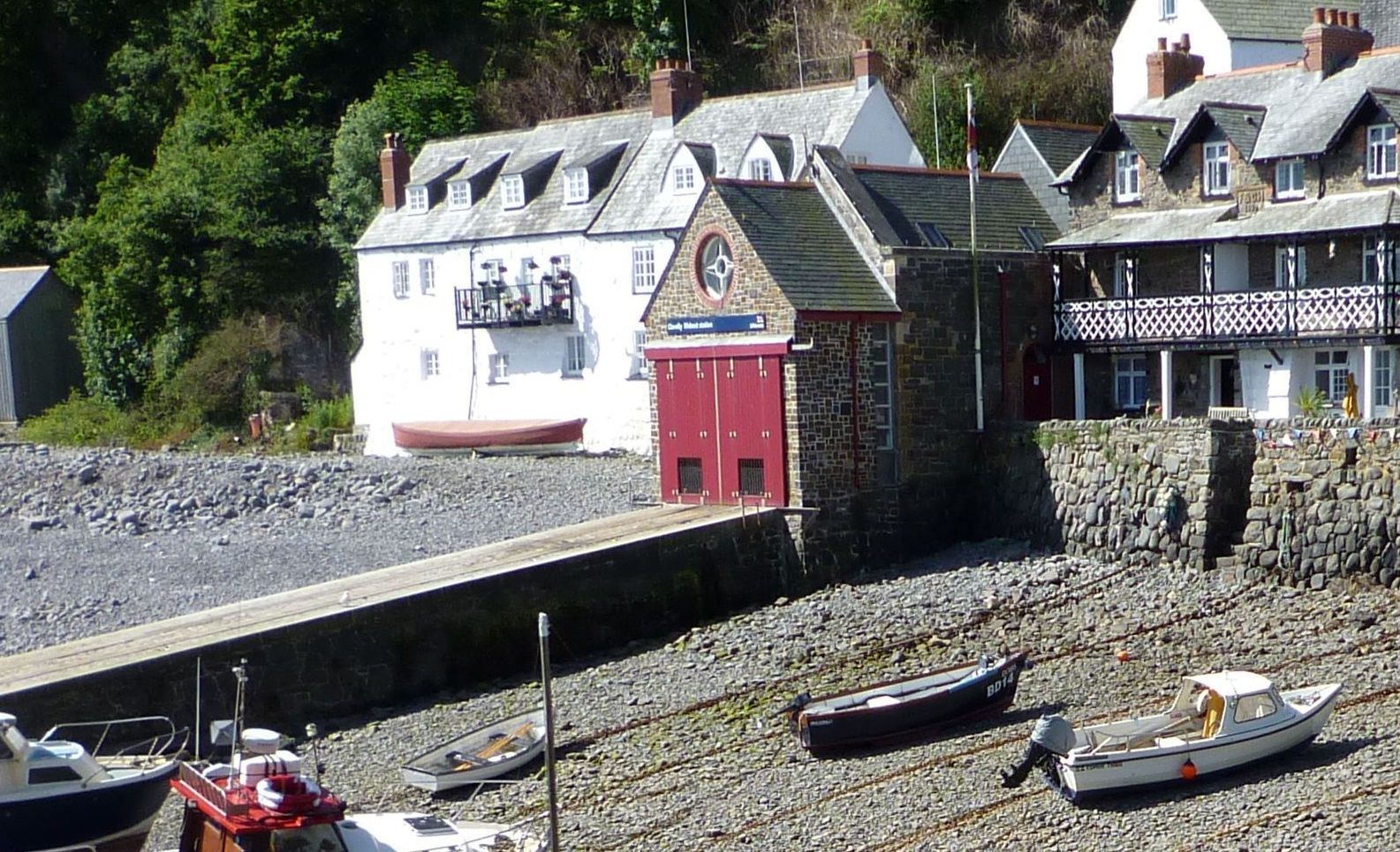
Clovelly Lifeboat Station

The village has had a Royal National Lifeboat Institution (RNLI) lifeboat station since 1870, which cost £175 to build. Between 1899 and 1931, the lifeboat saved 158 lives.

In 1988, the RNLI closed the station. In response, the villagers began operating their own rescue service. In 1998 the RNLI reopened the station. An Atlantic 85-class lifeboat was installed in 2014. It was named in honour of Toby Rundle, an Oxford student who took his own life in 2010.

== Architecture ==
Almost all the terraced buildings along the village's cobbled street are architecturally listed. More than 50 out of 71 are on the main street itself. Only seven buildings are not listed. The village's only Grade I listed building is the Church of All Saints, parts of which might still have some late Norman features, although its listing summary states, "Virtually all C15 and early C16, restored in 1843 and again in 1884". The Grade II* buildings are numbers 16, and 45–47, 53–54 (53 has the house name Crazy Kate's), and 59–61.

== Management ==
The Clovelly Estate Company owns all of the buildings in the village and is responsible for maintaining the village and preserving its character. The company is led by John Rous, a descendant of the Hamlyn family, who lives at Clovelly Court. John is the only son of Keith Rous, the 5th Earl of Stradbroke, by his second marriage, to Mary Asquith, granddaughter of former prime minister H. H. Asquith.

As of 2021, Clovelly included two chapels, two hotels, approximately 80 cottages, woodlands, and about 2000 acres of farmland. The village encourages tourism and its economy relies on the resulting income.

== Access ==
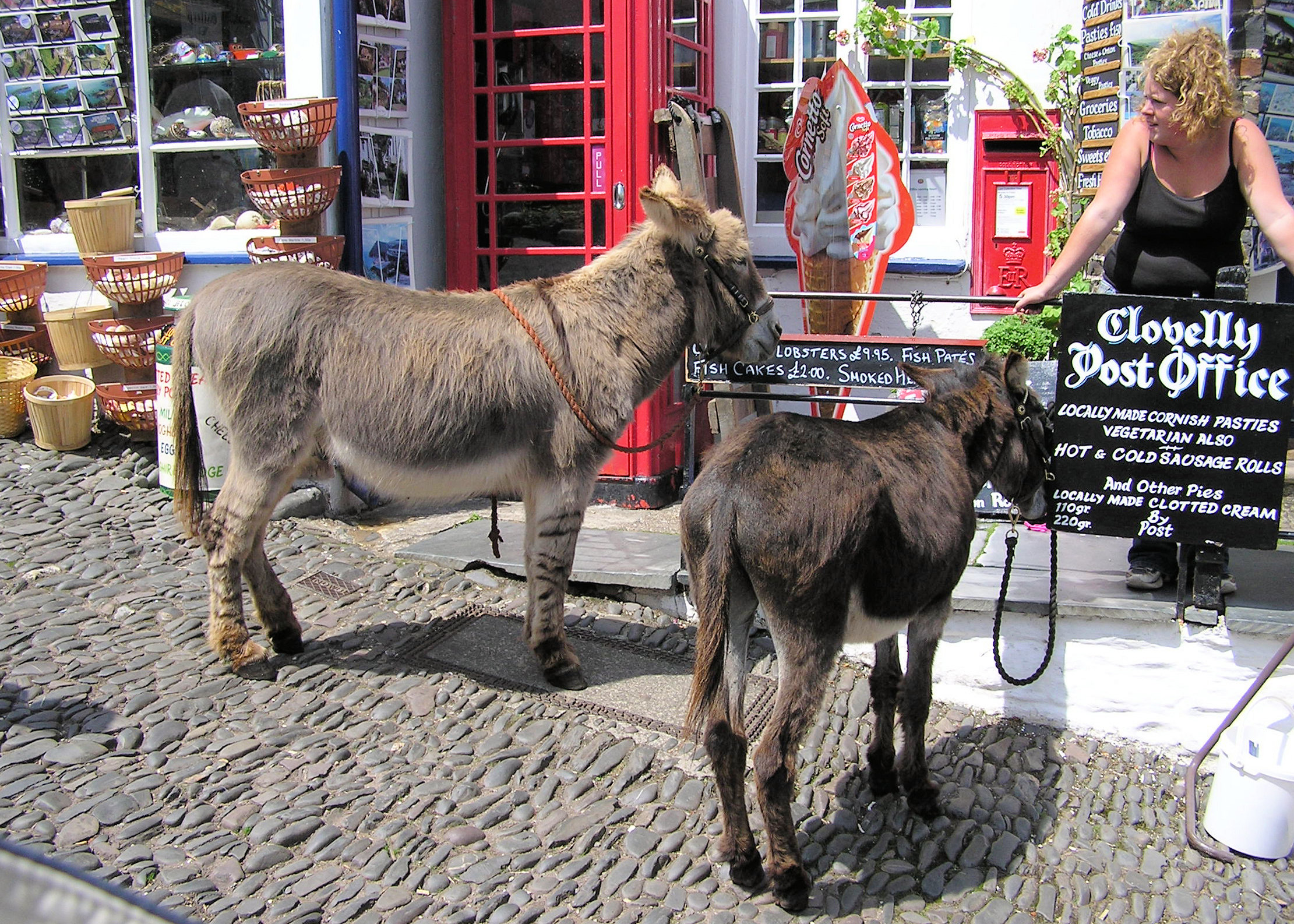
Donkeys on the steep main street, outside the village's post office. The slope can be seen by comparing the cobbled street with the (level) slate pavement in front of the shop.

The village main street is not accessible by motor vehicles.

The lack of vehicular access to the main street has led to deliveries being made by sledge. This is not done as a tourist attraction, but as a matter of practicality. Goods are delivered by being pulled down on a sledge from the upper car park, and refuse is collected by being pulled down the hill to a vehicle at the harbour.

The village is served by Stagecoach bus service 319; the route includes Barnstaple, Bideford and Hartland. The South West Coast Path National Trail runs from the top of the village.

From 2023, a per-person fee was instigated for entry into the village via its Visitor Centre, including the gardens of Clovelly Court and car parking, to fund maintenance of the village. Adult entry costs £9.50 and child entry is £5.50. Children under 7 are free. Dogs must be kept on a lead. The village is also legally accessible for free, on foot from public highways Clovelly High Street (known locally as "Up A Long" / "Down A Long"), Wrinkleberry Lane and Road to The Quay.

== Notable residents and cultural references ==
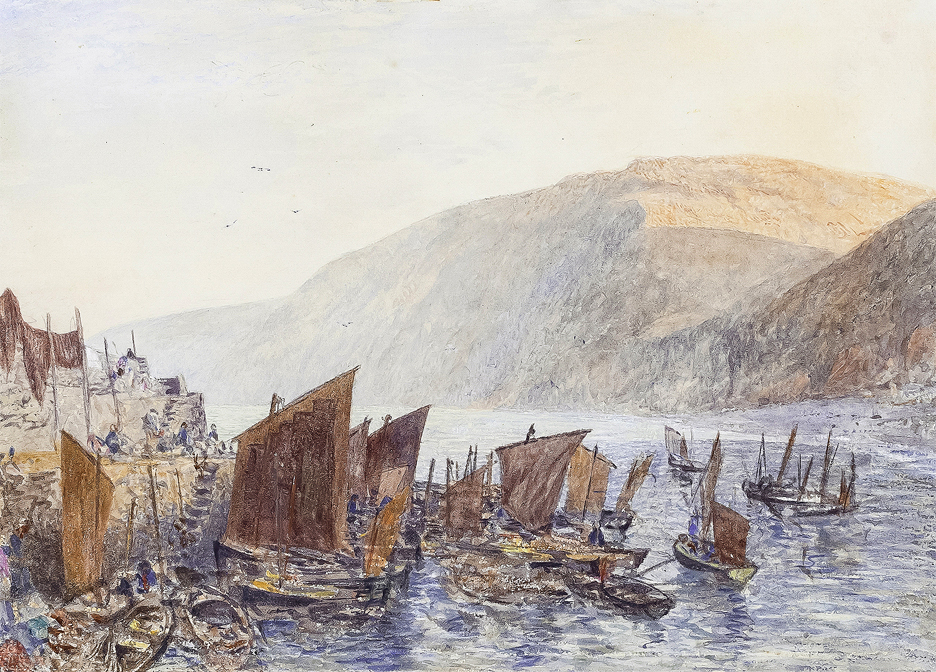
Clovelly Harbour, Devon by Alfred William Hunt (1830–1896)

The 16th-century Carys of Clovelly feature in the historical novel The Grove of Eagles by Winston Graham.

An 18th-century chapbook entitled The History of John Gregg and his Family of Robbers and Murderers explains that "Chovaley" (that is, Clovelly) was once the home of a tribe of fictional cannibalistic bandits. It is alleged that Gregg and his extended family of dozens were eventually tracked down by bloodhounds and were burnt alive in three fires. They were said to have lived in "a cave near the sea-side" and had committed some 1,000 murders. Writer Daniel Codd observes that a stretch of Clovelly Bay is called "the Devil's Kitchen"—"an apt name indeed if there is any truth in the ghoulish story of the Gregg family".

The surgeon Campbell De Morgan (1811–1876), who first speculated that cancer arose locally and then spread more widely in the body, was born here.

J. M. W. Turner's painting of Clovelly Harbour from around 1822 hangs in the National Gallery of Ireland, Dublin.

The novelist Charles Kingsley lived here as a child from 1831 to 1836, while his father, Rev. Charles Kingsley, served first as senior curate then as rector. Later, in 1855, his novel Westward Ho! did much to stimulate interest in Clovelly and to boost its tourist trade.

On Sunday, 28 October 1838, twelve fishing vessels with a total of twenty-six men on board left Clovelly Harbour for the fishing grounds. Only one vessel and its crew returned after a ferocious storm in the Bristol Channel. This event led to the founding of the Shipwrecked Mariners' Society early the following year with the object of:

giving relief and assistance to the widows and orphans of fishermen; and of mariners, members of the Society, who lose their lives by storms and shipwreck on any part of the coasts of the United Kingdom, while engaged in their lawful occupations; and also to render necessary assistance to such mariners, soldiers, or other poor persons as suffer shipwreck upon the said coasts.

The charity is active supporting the seafaring community suffering hardship and distress.

Clovelly is described by Charles Dickens in "A Message from the Sea" (1860) and was painted by Rex Whistler, whose cameos of the village were used on a china service by Josiah Wedgwood.

Local resident Joseph Harvey Jewell and his wife Mary Ann Jewell were two of only ten passengers to survive the wreck of the General Grant in 1866.

In Susan Coolidge's In the High Valley (1890), part of the Katy series, a walk into Clovelly is described:

...–surely a more extraordinary thing in the way of a street does not exist in the known world. The little village is built on the sides of a crack in a tremendous cliff; the "street" is merely the bottom of the crack, into which the ingenuity of man has fitted a few stones, set slant-wise, with intersecting ridges on which the foot can catch as it goes slipping hopelessly down.

Clovelly is mentioned in passing by Rudyard Kipling in Stalky & Co. (1899) as being located to the west of the boys' academy.

In 1973 the film Malachi's Cove was shot largely at Clovelly.

In 1989, actor Joss Ackland and his wife Rosemary bought a property in Higher Clovelly on the outskirts of the village. Ackland lived there until his death in 2023; Rosemary died in 2002 and is buried in the grounds of their home. Ackland appeared in promotional videos for the town and spoke often of his love of and connection to Clovelly.

== Twin towns – sister cities ==
Clovelly is twinned with:

- Cesny-Bois-Halbout, France

== See also ==
- North Devon Coast AONB
