= Cary family =

English aristocratic family

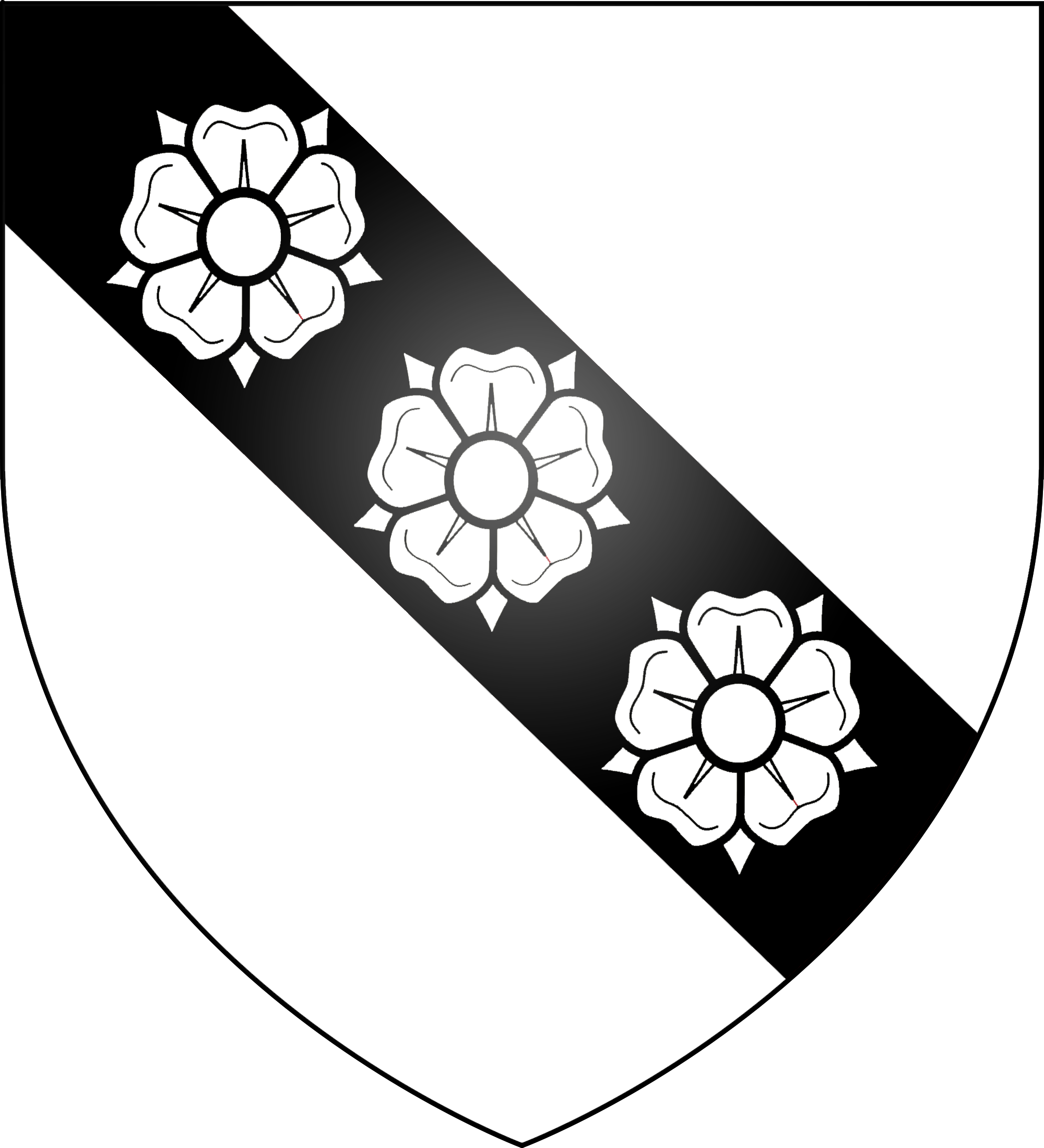
- Arms of Cary: Argent, on a bend sable three roses of the field
- Country: Kingdom of England, Kingdom of Ireland, United Kingdom of Great Britain and Ireland, United Kingdom
- Founded: 14th century (1300s)
- Founder: Sir John Cary
- Current head: Lucius Cary, 15th Viscount Falkland

The Cary family (also Carey) is an English aristocratic family with a branch in Ireland. The earliest known ancestor of the family is Sir Adam de Kari who was living in 1198. Sir John Cary (died 1395) purchased the Manor of Clovelly in the 14th century and established the family's status as members of the landed gentry. Various branches of the family were ennobled in the late 16th and early 17th centuries as Baron Hunsdon and Viscount Falkland.

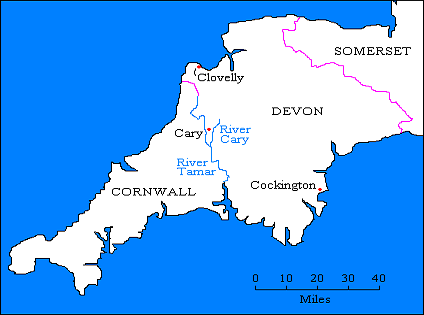
Seats of the Cary family in Devon: Cary, in the parish of St Giles in the Heathnext to the River Cary; Clovelly and Cockington, the latter both purchased by Sir John Cary (died 1395), Chief Baron of the Exchequer and Member of Parliament for Devon

== Origins ==
Sir John Cary (died 1395), who purchased the manor of Clovelly, but probably never lived there and certainly died in exile in Ireland. He was a judge who rose to the position of Chief Baron of the Exchequer (1386-8) and served twice as Member of Parliament for Devon, on both occasions together with his brother Sir William Cary, in 1363/4 and 1368/9. He was a son of Sir John Cary, Knight, by his second wife Jane de Brian, a daughter and co-heiress of Sir Guy de Brian (died 1349) (alias de Brienne), of Walwyn's Castle in Pembrokeshire and Torr Bryan, on the south coast of Devon, and sister of Guy de Bryan, 1st Baron Bryan, KG (died 1390). He married Margaret Holleway, daughter and heiress of Robert Holleway.

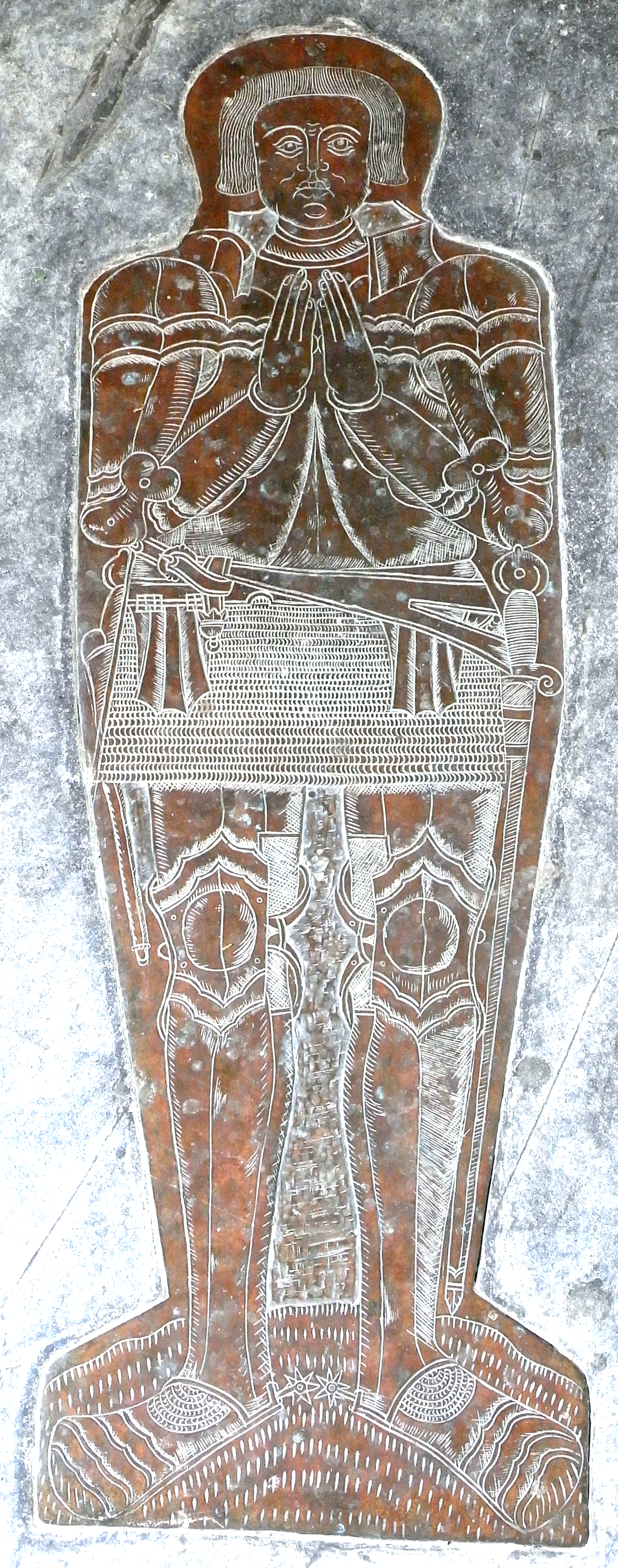
Monumental brass believed to represent Sir William Cary (1437–1471), lord of the manors of Clovelly and Cockington, Devon.

Sir John Cary's eldest son, Sir Robert Cary (died c. 1431) of Cockington, Devon, was 12 times MP for Devon. At some time after 1350 the Cary family acquired the manor of Cockington, in Devon, which they made their principal seat. Certainly according to Pole, Robert Cary held Cockington during the reign of King Henry IV (1399–1413). He was an esquire in the households of King Richard II (1377–1399) and of the latter's half-brother John Holland, 1st Duke of Exeter (c. 1352 – 1400). He married as his first wife Margaret Courtenay, a daughter of Sir Philip Courtenay (1340–1406), of Powderham, Devon, a younger son of Hugh Courtenay, 2nd Earl of Devon (1303–1377) by his wife Margaret de Bohun (died 1391), daughter and heiress of Humphrey de Bohun, 4th Earl of Hereford (1298–1322) by his wife Elizabeth Plantagenet, a daughter of King Edward I. Her eldest brother was Richard Courtenay (died 1415), Bishop of Norwich, a close friend and ally of Henry of Monmouth, later King Henry V (1413–1422), who did much to restore Robert Cary to royal favour after his father's attainder.

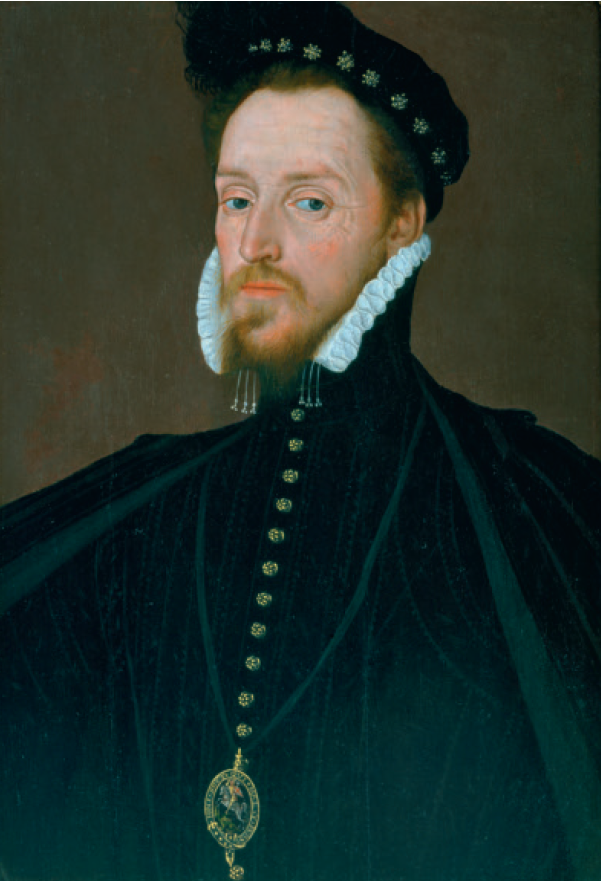
Henry Carey, 1st Baron Hunsdon, by Steven van Herwijck, c. 1561-63. Private collection, on loan to the Globe Theatre.

Sir Robert Cary's son by his first wife, his eldest son and heir, Sir Philip Cary (died 1437), of Cockington was MP for Devon in 1433. He married Christiana de Orchard (died 1472), daughter and heiress of William de Orchard of Orchard (later Orchard Portman), near Taunton in Somerset.

Sir Philip's son and heir, Sir William Cary (1437–1471), of Cockington, was beheaded after the defeat of the Lancastrians at the Battle of Tewkesbury in 1471. He is believed to be represented by a monumental brass of a knight, without surviving identifying inscription, set into a slate ledger stone on the floor of the chancel of All Saints Church, Clovelly, next to a smaller brass, in similar style, of his son and heir Robert Cary (died 1540). He married twice:

- Firstly to Elizabeth Poulett, a daughter of Sir William Poulett of Hinton St George, Somerset (ancestor of Earl Poulett), by whom he had a son and heir: Robert Cary (died 1540), of Cockington and Clovelly (whose descendants continued to occupy the Manor of Clovelly).
- Secondly he married Anna (or Alice) Fulford, a daughter of Sir Baldwin Fulford (died 1476) of Fulford, Devon, by whom he had a son: Thomas Cary of Chilton Foliat.

Thomas Cary of Chilton Foliat, above, married Margaret Spencer (1472–1536), (or Eleanor Spencer), one of the two daughters and co-heiresses of Sir Robert Spencer (d. circa 1510), "of Spencer Combe", in the parish of Crediton in Devon, by his wife Eleanor Beaufort (1431–1501), daughter of Edmund Beaufort, 2nd Duke of Somerset (1406–1455), KG. By Margaret Spencer he had two sons: Sir John Cary (1491–1552) of Plashey, eldest son, ancestor to the Cary Viscounts Falkland, and William Cary, the first husband of Mary Boleyn, sister of Queen Anne Boleyn, and ancestor to the Cary Barons Hunsdon, Barons Cary of Leppington, Earls of Monmouth, Viscounts Rochford and Earls of Dover.

== Viscounts Falkland ==
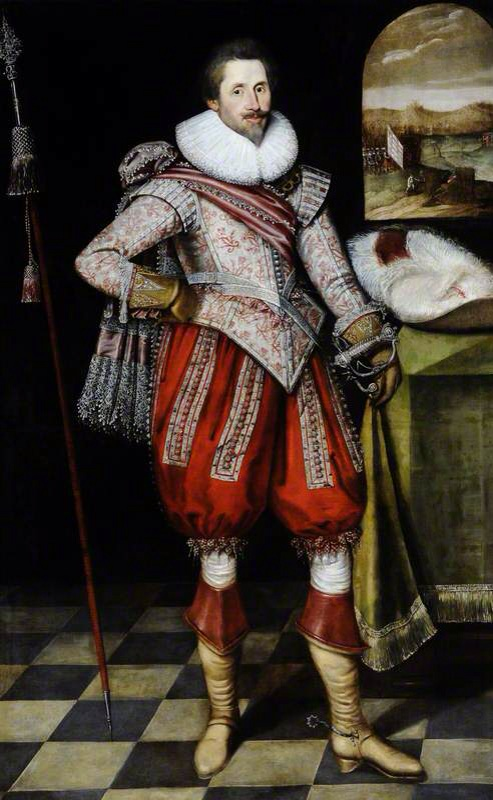
Henry Cary, 1st Viscount Falkland, c. 1625

Sir John Cary of Plashley, the eldest son of Thomas Cary of Chilton Foliat and his wife Margaret Spencer, was one of King Henry VIII's courtiers. He married Joyce Denny, a daughter of Sir Edmund Denny, and had two sons: Sir Edward Cary and Sir Wymond Cary.

Sir Edward Cary, above, married Katherine Knyvett (sister of Thomas Knyvet, 1st Baron Knyvet), and had 9 children, including Sir Philip Cary and Henry Cary, 1st Viscount Falkland, whose descendants still hold the title today.

== Barons Hunsdon ==
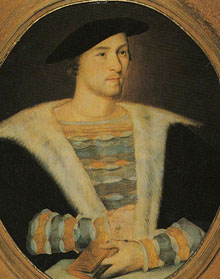
William Carey, attributed to Hans Holbein the Younger. From a private Irish collection.

William Carey (c. 1500-22 June 1528), younger son of Thomas Cary of Chilton Foliat and his wife Margaret Spencer, was a favourite courtier of King Henry VIII. His wife, Mary Boleyn, is known to history as a mistress of King Henry VIII and the sister of Henry's second wife, Anne Boleyn. He and Mary had two children (or because of Mary's affair, it has been suggested that these may have been instead Henry VIII's biological children (see Issue of Mary Boleyn). The veracity of this claim is the subject of historical debate.):

- Catherine Carey (c. 1524 – 15 January 1568). Maid of Honour to Anne of Cleves and Catherine Howard. She was married to the Puritan Sir Francis Knollys, Knight of the Garter. She was later lady-in-waiting to her cousin, Elizabeth I. One of her daughters, Lettice Knollys, became the second wife of Robert Dudley, 1st Earl of Leicester, the favourite of Elizabeth I.
- Henry Carey, 1st Baron Hunsdon (4 March 1526 – 23 July 1596). He was ennobled by Queen Elizabeth I just after her coronation and created Knight of the Garter in 1561. When he was dying, Elizabeth offered him the Boleyn family title, Earl of Ormonde, which he had long sought, but he refused the honour.
- A younger son of Henry's was Robert Carey, 1st Earl of Monmouth who was a courtier to James I and Charles I. He served on diplomatic missions abroad in his younger years.

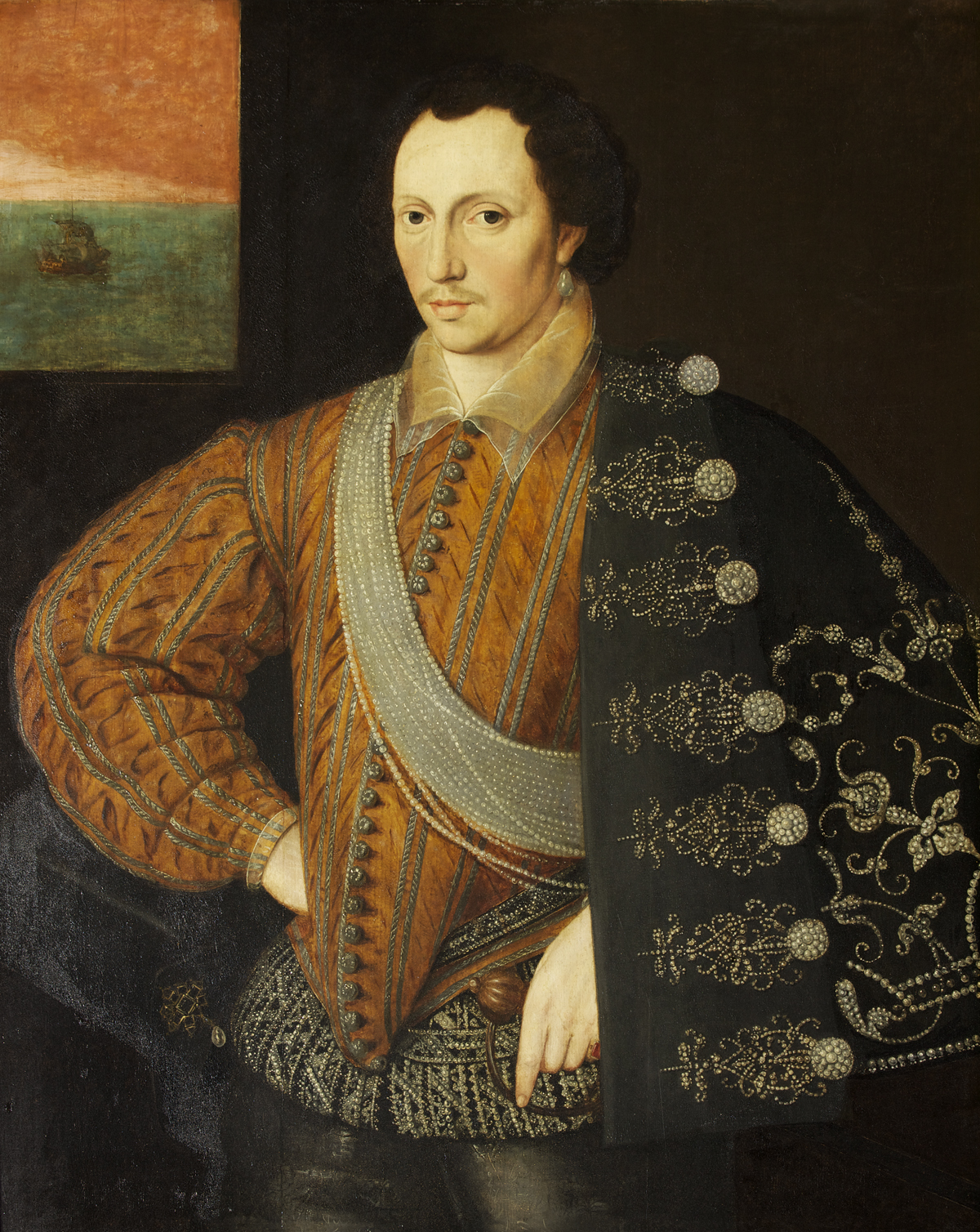
Robert Carey, 1st Earl of Monmouth, c. 1591.

== Cary of Clovelly ==
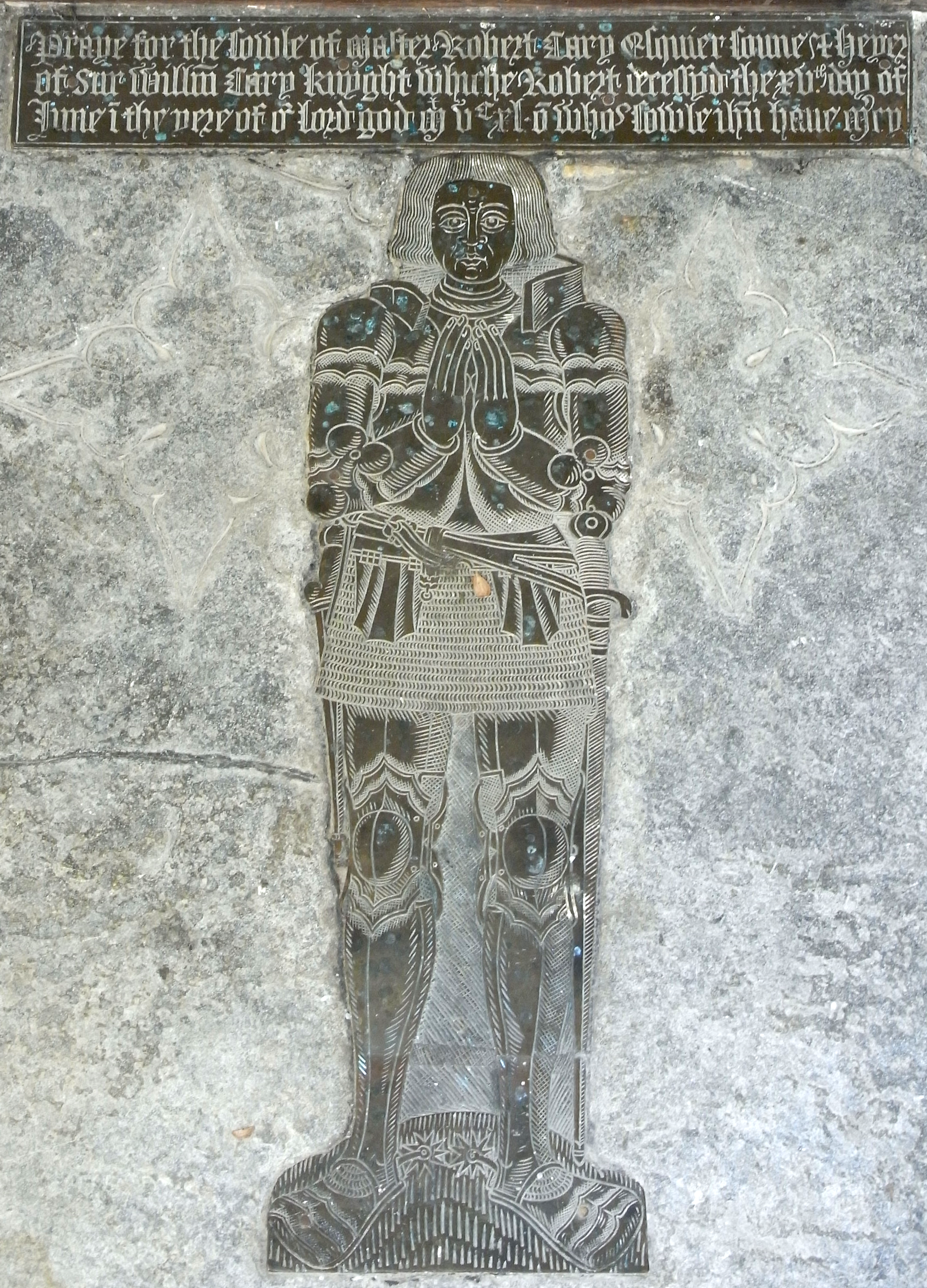
Monumental brass of Robert Cary (died 1540) of Clovelly. Floor of chancel, All Saints Church, Clovelly

Robert Cary (died 1540) of Cockington and Clovelly married three times:

- Firstly to Jane Carew, daughter of Nicholas Carew, Baron Carew (1424–1471), of Mohuns Ottery, Luppitt, Devon, by whom he had two sons:
  - John Cary (born 1502), eldest son and heir, who inherited the manor of Cary.
  - Thomas Cary (died 1567), 2nd son, who inherited Cockington.
- Secondly to Ames Hody (alias Huddye), daughter of Sir William Hody, Lord Chief Baron of the Exchequer 1486–1512, by whom he had a son:
  - William Cary (died 1550) of Ladford
- Thirdly to Margaret Fulkeram (died 1547), daughter and heiress of William Fulkeram of Dartmouth, Devon. A branch of the Fulkeram family (alias Fookeray, Fokeray, etc.,) were lords of the manor of Buckland Baron (Buckland-in-the-Moor) in Haytor Hundred. by Margaret Fulkeram he had issue:
  - Robert Cary (died 1586) of Clovelly (4th son).

Robert Cary (died 1586) of Clovelly, 4th son of his father, by his 3rd wife. He was given Clovelly by his father. He was the first Cary to be seated exclusively at Clovelly, the manors of Cary and Cockington having been inherited by his half-brothers. He was Member of Parliament for Barnstaple, Devon, in October 1553 and served as Sheriff of Devon in 1555–56. He served as Recorder of Barnstaple after 1560. He was a magistrate and along with several other members of the Devonshire gentry then serving as magistrates he died of jail fever at the Black Assize of Exeter 1586. He married Margaret Milliton, daughter of John Milliton and widow of John Giffard of Yeo in the parish of Alwington, North Devon. His large monument, with strapwork decoration, survives against the south wall of the chancel of All Saints Church, Clovelly. Along the full length of the cornice is inscribed in gilt capitals: Robertus Carius, Armiger, obiit An(no) Do(mini) 1586 ("Robert Cary, Esquire, died in the year of Our Lord 1586"). On the base of the north side are shown two relief sculpted heraldic escutcheons, showing Cary impaling Chequy argent and sable, a fess vairy argent and gules (Fulkeram, for his father) and Cary impaling Sable, three swords pilewise points in base proper pomels and hilts or (Poulett, for his grandfather). On the base of the west side is a similar escutcheon showing his own arms of Cary (of four quarters, 1st: Cary; 2nd: Or, three piles in point azure (Bryan); 3rd: Gules, a fess between three crescents argent (Holleway); 4th: A chevron (unknown, possibly Hankford: Sable, a chevron barry nebuly argent and gules) impaling Gules, a chevron or between three millets hauriant argent (Milliton)

George Cary (1543–1601), eldest son and heir of Robert Cary (died 1586), was Sheriff of Devon in 1587. He constructed at Clovelly a harbour wall, surviving today, described by Risdon as "a pile to resist the inrushing of the sea's violent breach, that ships and boats may with the more safety harbour there". Clovelly's main export product was herring fish, which formerly appeared at certain times of the year in huge shoals, close off-shore in the shallow waters of the Bristol Channel, and such a harbour wall was a great benefit to the village fishermen, tenants of the Cary lords of the manor. He married three times:

- Firstly to Christiana Stretchley, daughter and heiress of William Stretchley of Ermington in Devon and widow of Sir Christopher Chudleigh (1528–1570) of Ashton, by whom he had issue including:
  - William Cary (1576–1652) of Clovelly, JP, eldest son and heir.
- Secondly to Elizabeth Bampfield, eldest daughter of Richard Bampfield (1526–1594) of Poltimore, Devon, Sheriff of Devon in 1576; without issue.
- Thirdly in 1586 to Catherine Russell (died 1632), of Sussex, by whom he had 3 sons and 3 daughters.

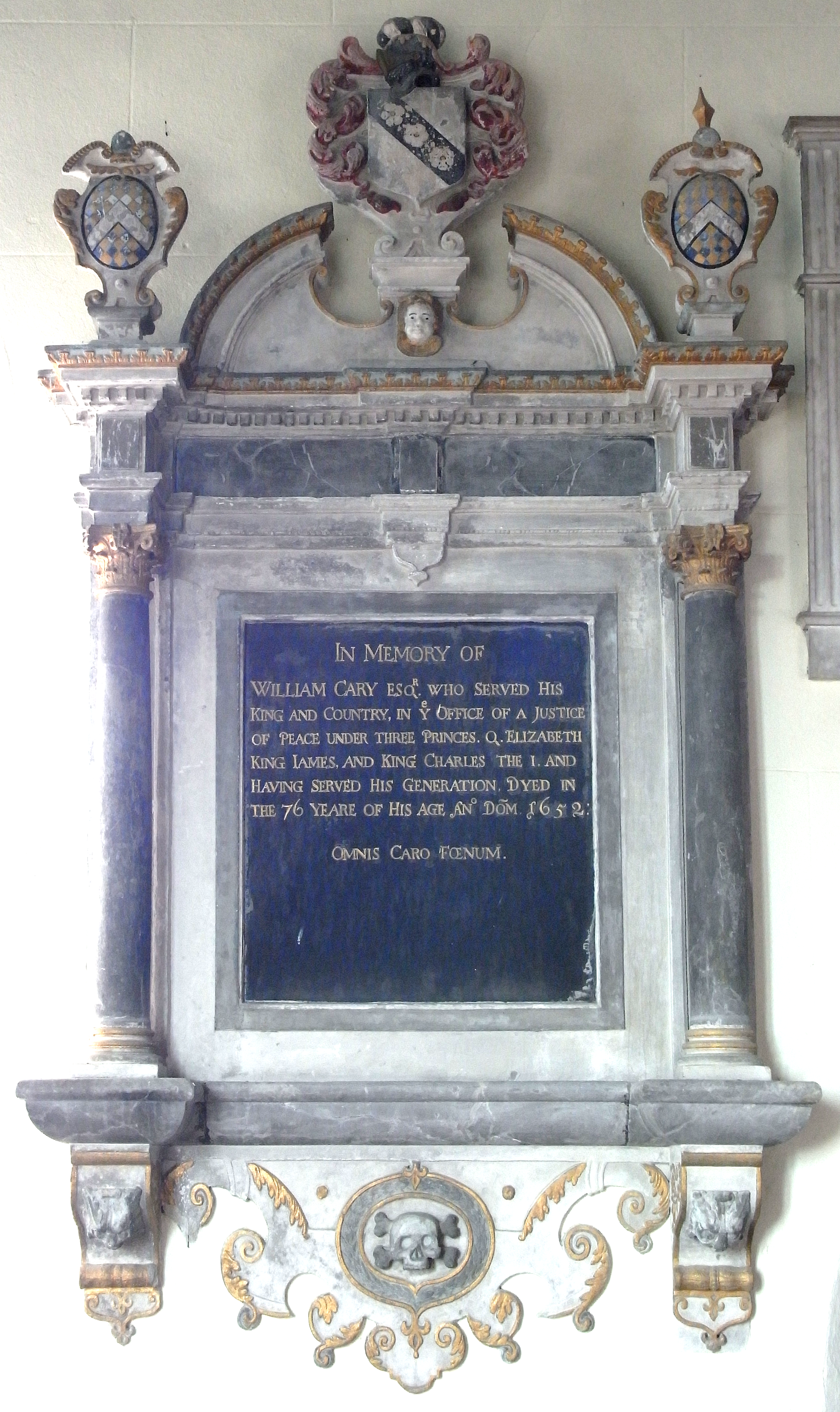
Mural monument to William Cary (1576–1652), All Saints Church, Clovelly

William Cary (1576–1652), son and heir of George Cary (1543-1601), was Justice of the Peace for Devon, MP for Mitchell, Cornwall, in 1604, eldest son and heir by his father's first wife. He is sometimes said to be the model for Will Cary featured in Westward Ho!, the 1855 novel by Charles Kingsley (1819–1875), who appears in the narrative concerning the Spanish Armada in 1588, although he would have been a boy aged just 12 at the time. However the "daring foreign exploits attributed to him are entirely fictional". Kingsley spent much of his childhood at Clovelly as his father was Rev. Charles Kingsley, Curate of Clovelly 1826-1832 and Rector 1832-1836. Indeed the author's small brass monumental tablet is affixed to the wall of the church under the mural monument of Sir Robert Cary (1610–1675), eldest son of William Cary (1576–1652).

He married three times:

- Firstly in 1598 to Gertrude Carew (died 1604), widow of John Arundell of Tolverne, Cornwall and daughter of the antiquarian and historian of Cornwall Richard Carew (1556–1620) of Antony in Cornwall, author of the Survey of Cornwall (1602), Sheriff of Cornwall (1583 and 1586), and MP for Saltash in 1584. By Gertrude Carew he had two daughters, Christiana Cary, eldest daughter, wife of Henry Helyar (died 1634) of Coker Court in Somerset, son of Rev. William Helyar (1559–1645), Doctor of Divinity, Archdeacon of Barnstaple and a chaplain to Queen Elizabeth I; and Phillipa Cary (1603–1633), 2nd wife of John Docton (1600–1653) of Docton, in the parish of Hartland, Devon, whose elaborate ledger stone survives in Clovelly Church, showing in the centre the arms of Docton (Per fess gules and argent, two crescents in chief or another in base sable) impaling Cary.
- Secondly he married Dorothy Gorges (died 1622), eldest daughter of Sir Edward Gorges of Wraxall, Somerset by his wife Dorothy Speke. Her monument survives in the Speke Chantry in Exeter Cathedral. By Dorothy Gorges he had issue including:
  - Sir Robert Cary (1610–1675), of Clovelly, the eldest son and heir.
  - Rev. George Cary (1611–1680), of Clovelly, 2nd son, Dean of Exeter and Rector of Shobrooke in Devon. His mural monument survives in Clovelly Church.
- Thirdly in 1631 to Jane Elworthy, widow of Narcissus Mapowder of Holsworthy, Devon.

Sir Robert Cary (1610–1675), eldest son and heir of William Cary (1576-1652), was a Gentleman of the Privy Chamber to King Charles II. He died unmarried and without children. His mural monument survives in Clovelly Church, erected by his younger brother and heir George Cary (1611–1680) and inscribed as follows:

"In memory of S^{r} Robert Cary K^{t} (sonne and heyre of William) Gentleman of the Privy Chamber unto King Charles the 2^{d} who having served faithfully that glorious prince, Charles the I^{st}, in the long Civil Warr against his rebellious subjects, and both him and his sonne as a Justice of Peace, he dyed a batchelour in the 65 yeare of his age An. Dom. 1675. Peritura Perituris Reliqui".

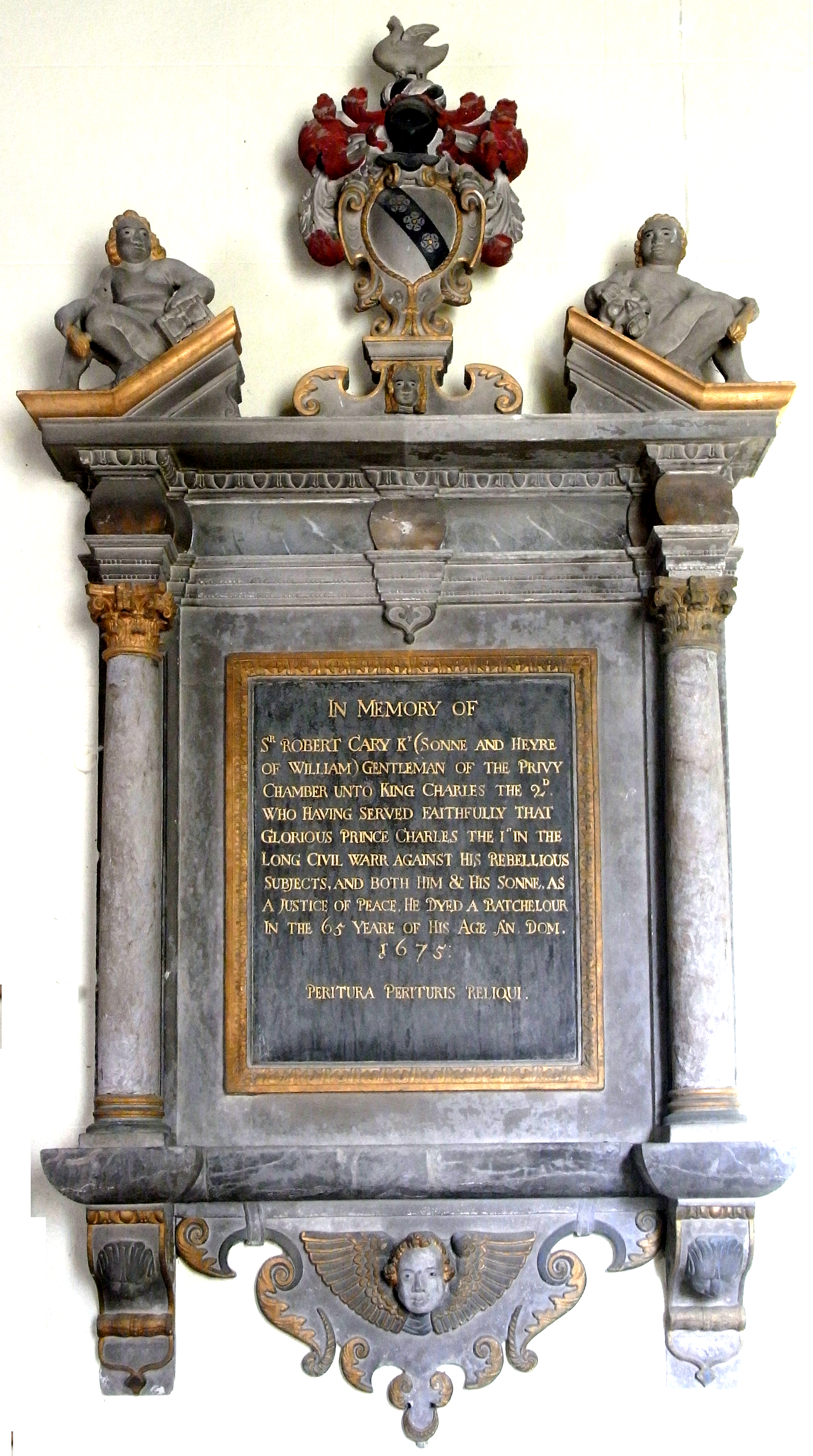
Mural monument to Sir Robert Cary (1610–1675), All Saints Church, Clovelly, north wall of chancel

Rev. George Cary (1611–1680), the second son of William Cary (1576-1652), (1611-1680) was a Professor (Doctor) of Divinity, Dean of Exeter (amongst other duties responsible for the maintenance and decoration of the cathedral building) and Rector of Shobrooke in Devon. He was one of the Worthies of Devon of John Prince (died 1723). He married Anne Hancock, daughter of William Hancock (died 1625), lord of the manor of Combe Martin, Devon, by whom he had numerous children. He was educated at Exeter Grammar School and in 1628 entered The Queen's College, Oxford but later moved to Exeter College, Oxford, much frequented by Devonians. His first clerical appointment was by his father as Rector of Clovelly. Following the Restoration of the Monarchy in 1660, he was appointed Chaplain in Ordinary to King Charles II, after which he received the honour of a Doctorate in Divinity from Oxford University. At the bequest of the Lord Chamberlain he preached a Lent sermon before the king, for which was much thanked by the Archbishop of Canterbury. During most of his career he lived about 44 miles south-east of Clovelly, at Exeter, and at Shobrooke, near Crediton, 9 miles to the north-west of Exeter. Indeed it appears that until about 1702 Clovelly was occupied by his second cousins, the three brothers John Cary, George Cary (died 1702) and Anthony Cary (died 1694), sons of Robert Cary of Yeo Vale, Alwington, near Clovelly. He rebuilt the rectory house at Shobrooke, which he found in a dilapidated state and made it "a commodious and gentile dwelling". He also rebuilt the "ruinous,...filthy and loathsome" Dean's House in Exeter, which during the Civil War had been let to negligent tenants by the See of Exeter, and "in a short time so well repaired, so thoroughly cleansed and so richly furnished this house that it became a fit receptacle for princes". As the Emperor Augustus with the City of Rome, so did Dean Cary with the Dean's House in Exeter "found it ruines but he left it a palace", as Prince suggests. Indeed King Charles II stayed there on the night of 23 July 1670, having visited the newly built Citadel in Plymouth. It was also the chosen abode of Christopher Monck, 2nd Duke of Albemarle, Lord lieutenant of Devon, for three weeks in 1675 and again during the Monmouth Rebellion. He was a liberal benefactor in assisting the Corporation of Exeter in the completion in 1699 of the cutting of a leat between Exeter Quay and Topsham, which fed into a pool which could shelter 100 ships. He twice refused offers of the Bishopric of Exeter made by King Charles II, on vacancies arising in 1666 and 1676. The reason for his first refusal, or profession of Nolo Episcopari, is unknown, but he refused the second time due to age and infirmity which would prevent him attending Parliament as would be required. He died at Shobrooke but was buried in Cloveely Church. His mural monument survives in Clovelly Church, erected by his eldest son Sir George Cary (1654–1685), the armorials of the latter's two wives appearing on the top of the monument as follows: dexter: Azure, a chevron between three mullets pierced or (Davie of Canonteign, Christow); sinister: Or, a lion reguardant sable langued gules (Jenkyn of Cornwall). The Latin inscription is as follows:

Sir George Cary (1654–1685), eldest son and heir of Rev. George Cary, was knighted by King Charles II during his father's lifetime and in 1681 served as Member of Parliament for Okehampton, Devon, and occupied the honourable position of Recorder of Okehampton. He married twice as follows, but left no children:

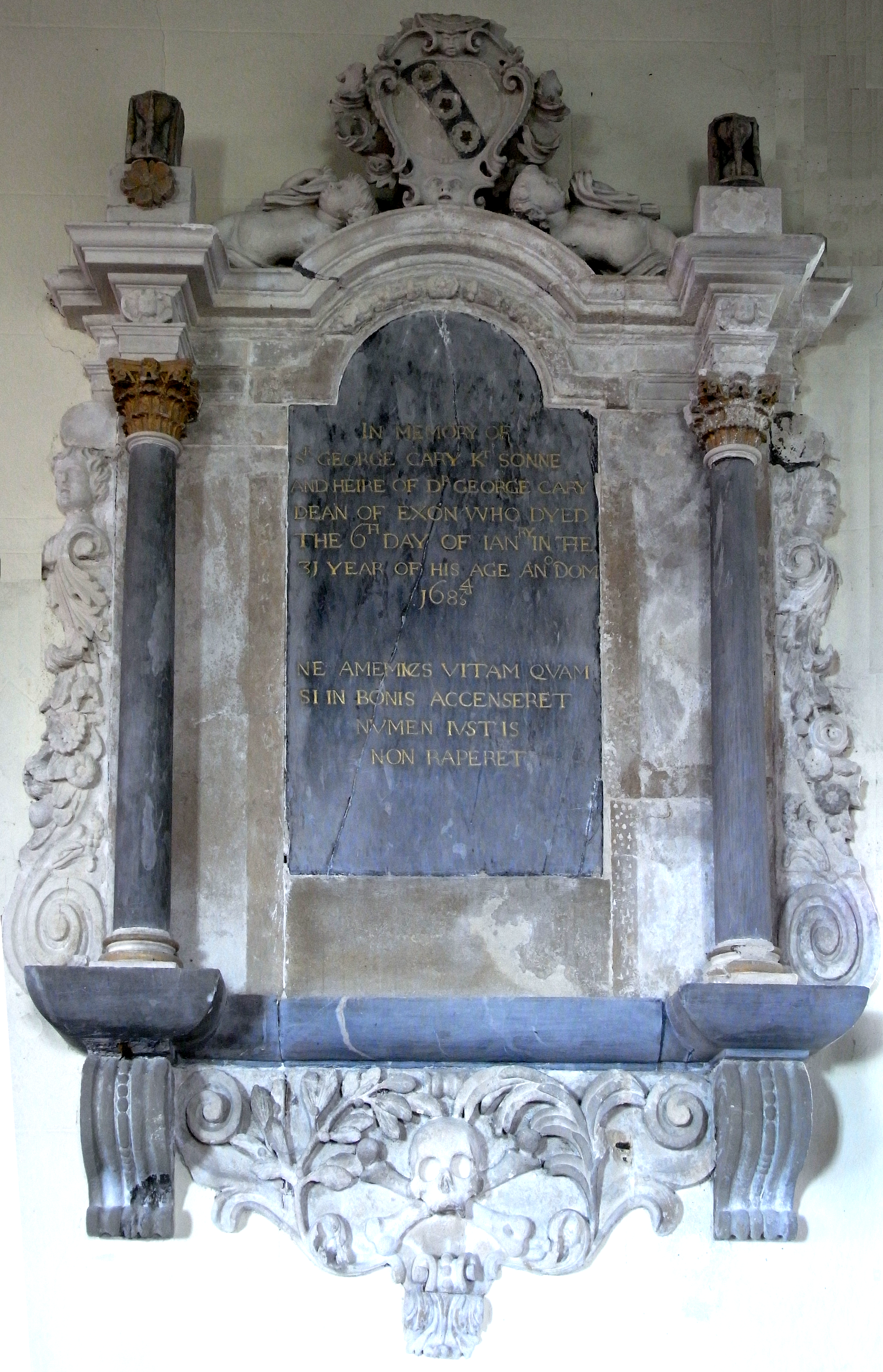
Mural monument to Sir George Cary (1654–1685), Clovelly Church

- Firstly in 1676 to Elizabeth Jenkyn (1656–1677), daughter and co-heiress (with her sisters Anne Jenkyn, wife of Sir John St Aubyn, 1st Baronet (1645–1687), of Trekenning, MP for Mitchell and Catherine Jenkyn, wife of John Trelawny (c. 1646 – 1680) of Trelawny, MP for West Looe) of James Jenkyn of Trekenning, St. Columb Major, Cornwall.
- Secondly in 1679 to Martha Davie, daughter and heiress of William Davie of Canonteign in the parish of Christow, Devon. The arms of Davie of Canonteign (Azure, a chevron between three mullets pierced or) (a variant of Davie of Creedy, Sandford) are shown on the top dexter of the monument Sir George Cary erected to his father in Clovelly Church. Without issue.

Carey's Estate Act 1703
- Act of Parliament
- Parliament of England
- Long title: An Act for vesting the Manor of Yeovilton, in the County of Somerset, and other Lands therein mentioned, of William Cary Esquire, in Trustees, for discharging Incumbrances, and making Provision for his Younger Children; and settling other Lands, in the County of Devon, in Lieu thereof.
- Citation: 2 & 3 Ann. c. 33 Pr.
- Territorial extent: England and Wales

Dates
- Royal assent: 3 April 1704
- Commencement: 9 November 1703 (Note: Start of session.)

Status: Current legislation

William Cary (c. 1661 – 1710), younger son of Rev. George Cary (1611-1680), was twice Member of Parliament for Okehampton in Devon 1685-1687 and 1689-1695 and also for Launceston in Cornwall 1695-1710. His mural monument survives in Clovelly Church. In 1704 he obtained a private act of Parliament, Carey's Estate Act 1703 (2 & 3 Ann. c. 33 Pr.), to allow him to sell entailed lands in Somerset and to re-settle his Devon estates in order to pay debts and provide incomes for his younger children. He was suffering financial difficulties and applied to Robert Harley for a lucrative government post to restore his finances:

"...by 16 or 17 years of war my estate, which mostly lies near the sea, has felt more than ordinary calamities of it, and hath been lessened in its income beyond most of my neighbours living in the inland country, and that a considerable jointure upon it, and four small children and the Act of Parliament procured last session for dismembering it, are motives which concur with my ambition to serve her Majesty".

He married twice:

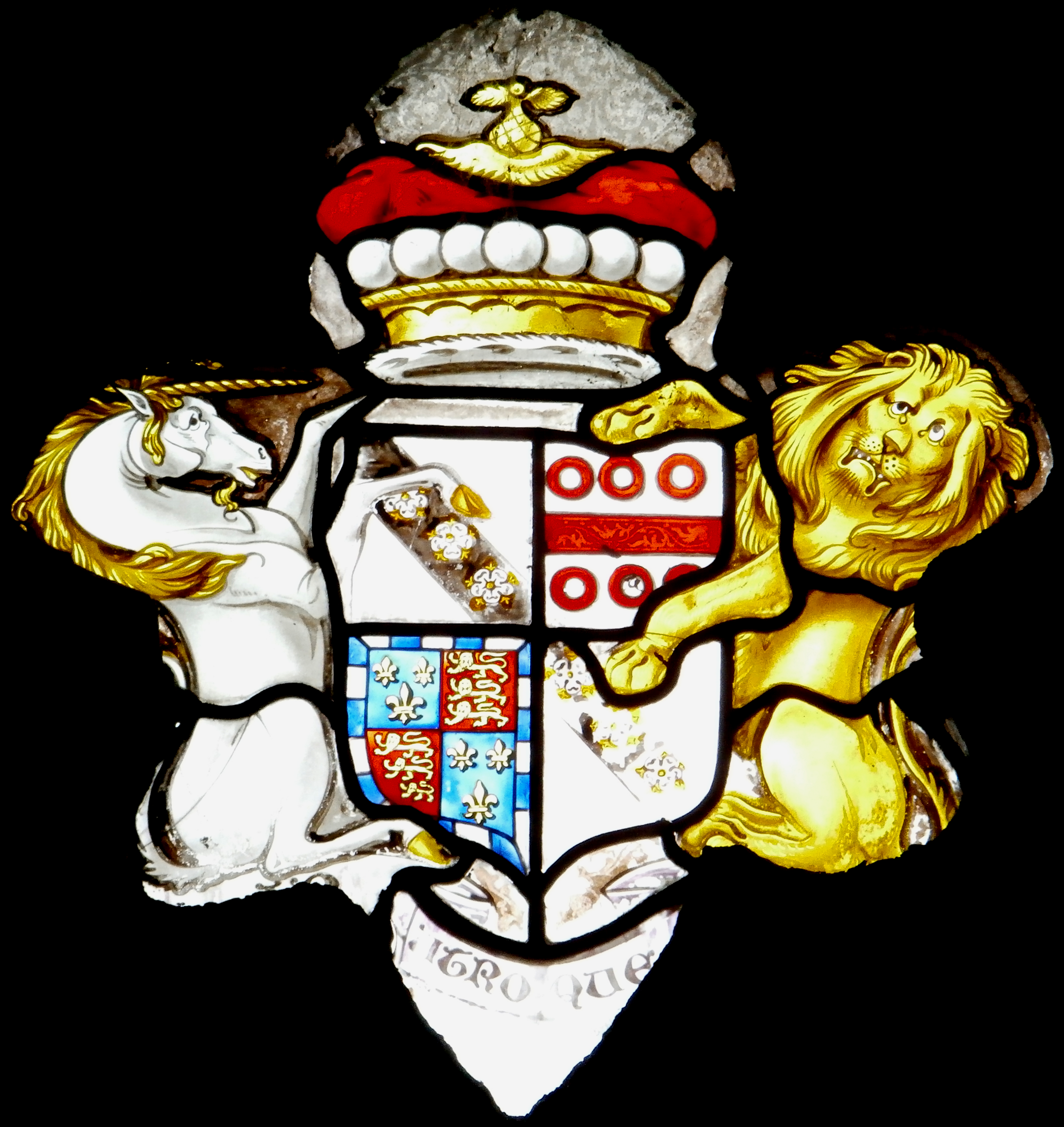
Stained-glass heraldic achievement of Lucius Cary, 6th Viscount Falkland (1687–1730), south chancel window, All Saints Church, Clovelly. His distant cousin Elizabeth Cary, the last of the Cary family of Clovelly, died in 1738 and the manor was sold by her husband Robert Barber in 1739. There is no reason to suppose that Cary arms were affixed inside the church after that date

- Firstly, after 1683, to Joan Wyndham (1669–1687), a daughter of Sir William Wyndham, 1st Baronet (c. 1632 – 1683) of Orchard Wyndham, Watchet, Somerset, Member of Parliament for Somerset 1656-1658 and for Taunton 1660-1679. She died aged 18 and was buried in the Wyndham Chapel of St Decuman's Church, Watchet, Somerset. Without issue.
- Secondly in 1694 to Mary Mansel (died 1701), daughter of Thomas Mansel of Briton Ferry, Glamorgan, MP, and sister of Thomas Mansel, MP. She brought a large dowry of £5,000. her mural monument survives in Clovelly Church inscribed as follows:

"In memory of Mary the wife of William Cary of y^{s} parish, Esq^{r} who was buried the 6th of February 1700. Also in memory of Robert Cary of y^{s} parish Esq^{r} who depart^{d} y^{s} life y^{e} 7th of March 1723. Als in memory of M^{rs} Ann Cary who depart^{d} y^{s} life y^{e} 23 of May 1728. This monument was erected by the desire of y^{e} said M^{rs} Ann Cary and perform^{d} by her sister M^{rs} Elizabeth the last of y^{e} family & now wife to Rob'rt Barber Esq of Ashmore in y^{e} county of Dorset"By Mary Mansel he had children 3 sons and 2 daughters, which generation was the last of the Cary family of Clovelly:

  - Robert Cary (1698–1724), eldest son, who died aged 26. His ledger stone slab survives on the floor of the chancel of Clovelly Church. He is also mentioned on the monument to his mother in Clovelly Church.
  - William Cary (1698–1724), died aged 26.
  - George Cary (1701–1701), 3rd son, died an infant.
  - Ann Cary (1695–1728), eldest daughter, died unmarried aged 33. Her ledger stone slab survives on the floor of the chancel of Clovelly Church. She is also mentioned on the monument to her mother in Clovelly Church.
  - Elizabeth Cary (1699–1738), youngest daughter, wife of Robert Barber (died 1758) of Ashmore in Dorset, by whom she had issue 2 sons and 4 daughters. She was the last of the Carys of Clovelly, which manor was sold in 1739, one year after her death, to Zachary Hamlyn. Her mural monument, a marble tablet, survives in St Nicholas's Church, Ashmore, (now in the vestry, formerly on the north wall) inscribed as follows:

"In memory of Elizabeth, wife of Robert Barber of Ashmore, in the county of Dorset, Esq., by whom she left two sons, viz. : Robert Cary Barber and Jacob; and four daughters, viz. : Ann, Elizabeth, Lucy and Molly. She was daughter of William Cary of Clovelly, in the county of Devon, Esq. He was member of Parliament for Launceston, in the county of Cornwall. His first wife was Joan, aunt to the present Sir Will. Windham. His second wife Mary, daughter of Thomas Mansell of Britton Ferry, in the county of Glamorgan, Esq., nearly related to Lord Mansell. She was the last of the family of the Carys of Clovelly aforesaid, who descend from the ancient branch of the noble family of which was and are Cary Lord Hunsdon, Cary Lord Faulkland, Cary Lord Lepington and Monmouth, Sir Robert and Sir George Cary. She died in May 1738".

== Carys in Ireland ==
George Cary (1589-1640), a grandson of Robert Cary (died 1586), was one of the first aldermen of the city of Derry in 1613 and was appointed, in the same year, Recorder of Derry. He was Member of Parliament for County Londonderry in the Parliament of Ireland from 1615-1640. He married Jane Beresford, sister of Sir Tristram Beresford, 1st Baronet, in 1615, with whom he had many children. His daughter, Elizabeth, married George Hart, a son of Captain Henry Hart, with whom she was the progenitor of the Hart family of Kilderry House, Glenalla House and Carrablagh House in Donegal.

The Cary family remained landlords in Inishowen until losing their property after the passage of the Irish Land Act in 1882. The Anglo-Irish writer Joyce Cary was a descendant of this branch of the Cary family.

== Carys in Portugal ==
As a page in the company of Queen Catherine of Braganza, daughter of John IV of Portugal, came John Cary (Abbey Tower, 7 December 1657 - Lisbon, 25 May 1732), father of Anthony Charles then Dom António Carlos Cary (Somerset House, London, 15 February 1689 - Estremoz, 1762), of whom descend those of the surname, also used as Cari, in Portugal, now extinct in male line. The arms they use are: argent, band sable, charged with three roses argent, buttoned or; crest: a swan argent.

== Lineage ==
- Sir John Cary
  - Sir John Cary (died 1395)
    - Sir Robert Cary (died c. 1431)
      - Philip Cary (died 1437)
        - Sir William Cary (1437–1471)
          - Robert Cary (died 1540)
            - Thomas Cary (died 1567)
              - Sir George Carey (c. 1541–1616)
            - Robert Carey (died 1586)
          - Sir Thomas Carey (1455–1500)
            - Sir John Carey (c. 1491–1552)
              - Sir Edward Cary (died 1618)
                - Henry Cary, 1st Viscount Falkland (c. 1575–1633)
                  - Lucius Cary, 2nd Viscount Falkland (1610–1643)
                    - Lucius Cary, 3rd Viscount Falkland (1632–1649)
                    - Henry Cary, 4th Viscount Falkland (1634–1663)
                      - Anthony Cary, 5th Viscount Falkland (1656–1694)
                  - Patrick Cary (c. 1623–1657)
                    - Edward Cary (1656–1692)
                      - Lucius Cary, 6th Viscount Falkland (1687–1730)
                        - Lucius Cary, 7th Viscount Falkland (c. 1707–1785)
                          - Lucius Cary, Master of Falkland (1735–1780)
                            - Henry Cary, 8th Viscount Falkland (1766–1796)
                            - Charles Cary, 9th Viscount Falkland (1768–1809)
                              - Lucius Cary, 10th Viscount Falkland (1803–1884)
                              - Plantagenet Cary, 11th Viscount Falkland (1806–1886)
                              - Byron Cary (1808–1874)
                                - Byron Cary, 12th Viscount Falkland (1845–1922)
                                  - Lucius Cary, 13th Viscount Falkland (1880–1961)
                                    - Lucius Cary, 14th Viscount Falkland (1905–1984)
                                      - Lucius Cary, 15th Viscount Falkland (born 1935)
                                        - Alexander Cary, Master of Falkland (born 1963)
                                  - Philip Cary (1895–1968)
                - Philip Cary (c. 1579–1631)
            - William Carey (c. 1495–1528)
              - Catherine Carey (c. 1524–1569)
              - Henry Carey, 1st Baron Hunsdon (1526–1596)
                - George Carey, 2nd Baron Hunsdon (1547–1603)
                  - Elizabeth Carey (1576–1635)
                - Catherine Carey (c. 1550–1603)
                - John Carey, 3rd Baron Hunsdon (c. 1556–1617)
                  - Henry Carey, 1st Earl of Dover (c. 1580–1666)
                    - John Carey, 2nd Earl of Dover (1608–1677)
                    - Sir Pelham Carey
                - Sir Edmund Carey (c. 1558–1637)
                - Robert Carey, 1st Earl of Monmouth (c. 1560–1639)
                  - Henry Carey, 2nd Earl of Monmouth (1596–1661)
                  - Thomas Carey (1597–1634)
                    - Elizabeth Carey (died 1679)
                  - Philadelphia Carey (died 1654)
                - Philadelphia Carey (c. 1563–1628)
                - Valentine Cary (c. 1570–1626)

== See also ==
- Baron Hunsdon
- Viscount Falkland
- Earl of Monmouth

== Bibliography ==
- Fisher, Barbara. Joyce Cary Remembered: In Letters and Interviews by His Family and Others. (Colin Smythe Ltd. 1988)
- Hart, Henry Travers. The Family History of Hart of Donegal. (M. Hughes & Clarke, 1907)
