= Lucius Cary =

Lucius Cary may refer to one of several members of the Cary family, most who held the title Viscount Falkland:

- Lucius Cary, 2nd Viscount Falkland (1610–1643)
- Lucius Cary, 3rd Viscount Falkland (1632–1649)
- Lucius Cary, 6th Viscount Falkland (1687–1730)
- Lucius Cary, 7th Viscount Falkland (c. 1707–1785)
- Lucius Cary (British Army officer) (1735–1780) son of 7th Viscount and MP for Bridport
- Lucius Cary, 10th Viscount Falkland (1803–1884)
- Lucius Cary, 13th Viscount Falkland (1880–1961)
- Lucius Cary, 14th Viscount Falkland (1905–1984)
- Lucius Cary, 15th Viscount Falkland (born 1935)
- Lucius Cary, Master of Falkland (born 1963)
