= Pelham Carey =

English courtier

Sir Pelham Carey (died by 1643) was a courtier during the reign of Charles I of England.

== Life ==
His wife was Mary Carey, Lady Carey. He was a great-grandson of Mary Boleyn, one of the Mistresses of Henry VIII, both of whose children, including Carey's ancestor, were rumoured to have been fathered by Henry VIII of England. Henry VIII later made Mary's sister, His father was Henry Carey, 1st Earl of Dover, who inherited the title Viscount Rochford and was later made first Earl of Dover by Charles I. His mother was Judith Pelham, daughter of Sir Thomas Pelham, 1st Baronet.

Mary Carey, Lady Carey was an author and poet.

They had no children, and neither did his brother, John Carey, 2nd Earl of Dover, leading to the Earldom of Dover becoming extinct.
