= Heveningham (name) =

Heveningham was the name of a prominent Norfolk family. Notable people with the surname include:

- Mary Heveningham, mistress of Henry VIII during his marriage to her cousin, Anne Boleyn.
- William Heveningham (1604-1678), Roundhead politician.

== See also ==
- Heveningham
