= Mary Carey, Lady Carey =

Mary, Lady Carey (née Jackson, later Payler; c. 1609 – c. 1680) was the author of poems and meditations.

Mary Carey was the daughter of Sir Robert Jackson of Berwick-upon-Tweed. In June 1630 she married Pelham Carey, second son of Henry Carey, 1st Earl of Dover and his second wife Judith Pelham. She subsequently married George Payler, Surveyor-General of the Ordnance, although she was always known as Lady Carey.

Mary Carey had seven children by her second husband, of whom five died in childhood. Her spiritual dialogue, meditations, and poems, written predominantly in response to her experience of loss and addressed to her 'loving and most beloved husband' circulated in manuscript.

There are monuments to three of her children, Robert, Samuel and Maria, with marble busts of Mary and George in the Church of St Peter ad Vincula.
