= William Cockayne =

English merchant and politician (1561–1626)

Sir William Cockayne
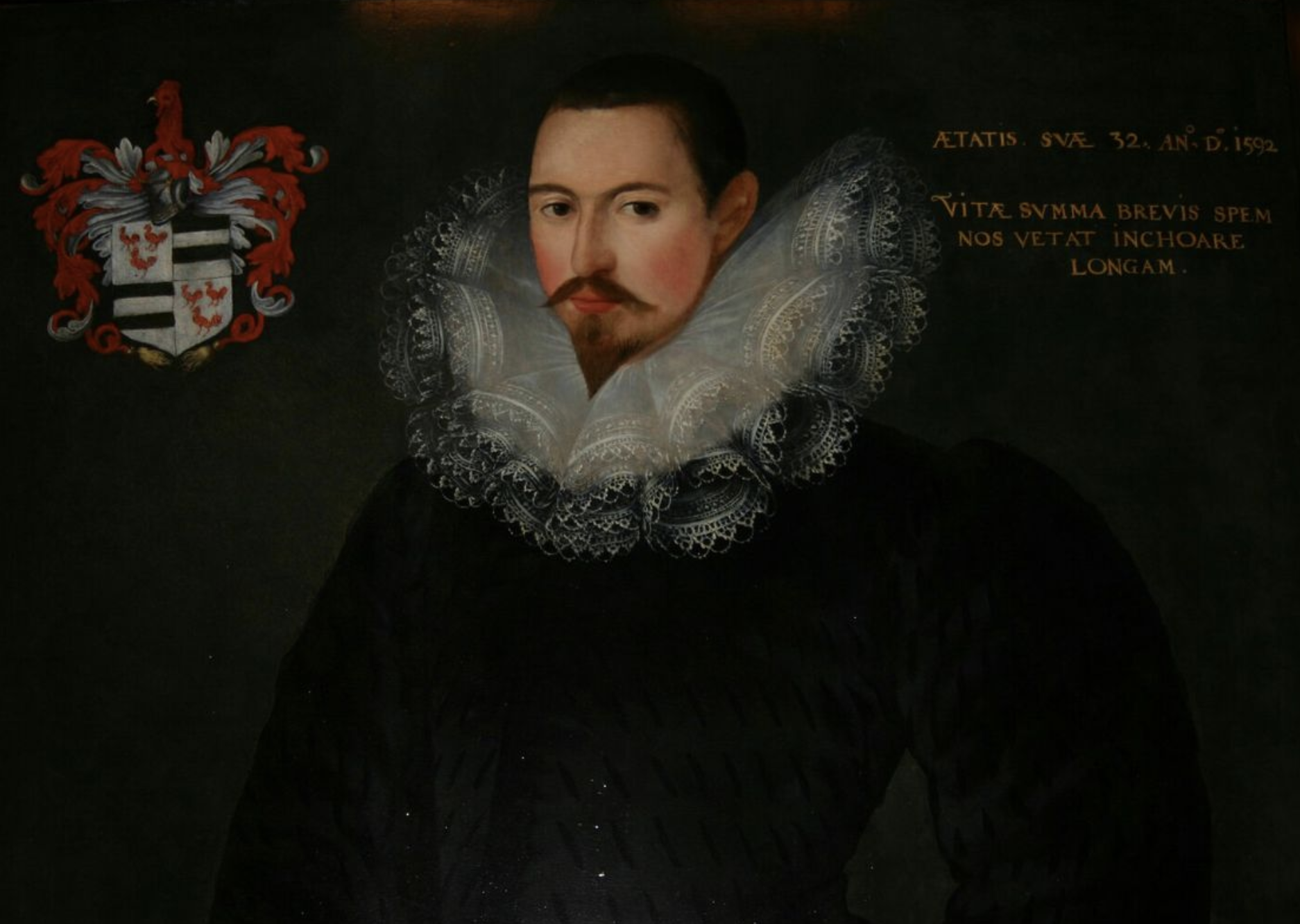

Lord Mayor of London
- In office 1619–1619
- Preceded by: Sebastian Harvey
- Succeeded by: Francis Jones

Personal details
- Born: 1561 England
- Died: 20 October 1626 Kingston, Surrey
- Occupation: Merchant, politician

Sir William Cockayne (1561 – 20 October 1626) was an English merchant and politician who served as the Lord Mayor of London in 1619.

== Life ==
He was the second son of William Cokayne of Baddesley Ensor, Warwickshire, merchant of London, sometime governor of the Eastland Company, by Elizabeth, daughter of Roger Medcalfe of Meriden, Warwickshire; and was descended from William Cokayne of Sturston, Derbyshire, a younger son of Sir John Cokayne of Ashbourne in that county.

Apprenticed at Christmas 1582 to his father, he was made free of the Skinners' Company by patrimony on 28 March 1590. On his father's death on 28 November 1599 he took over the running of his company.

He was sheriff of London in 1609, and alderman of Farringdon Without from 1609 to 1613, of Castle Baynard from 1613 to 1618, of Lime Street from 1618 to 1625, and of Broad Street from 1625 till his death.

=== Governor of Londonderry ===
On 8 January 1613, Cockayne, who was already the first Governor of The Irish Society, was appointed the first Governor of Londonderry. It was due to the development directed by The Irish Society towards rebuilding and expanding the city, that it was renamed Londonderry in honour of the capital and colonisation from London. On 8 June 1616, he was dubbed a knight by King James I.

=== Lord Mayor of London ===
During Cockayne's mayoralty (1619–20) King James visited St Paul's Cathedral with a view to raising money to complete the spire, and was received by Cockayne in great state. A pageant entitled "The Triumphs of Love and Antiquity" was performed for Cockayne's mayoral inauguration on 29 October 1619, written by Thomas Middleton. In 1620 the marriage between Charles Howard and Cockayne's daughter Mary was celebrated. During this time, King James I frequently consulted him, both in the privy council and privately.

=== The Cockayne project ===
In 1614, while serving as governor of the Eastland Company of English merchants, Cockayne devised a plan to dye and dress English cloth, England's main export at the time, before shipping it abroad. Cockayne convinced James I to grant him a monopoly on cloth exports as a part of this plan, intended to increase the profits of English merchants, while boosting royal customs duties through bypassing Dutch merchants. The scheme failed as the Dutch refused to purchase finished cloth from the monopoly and instead engaged in a trade war with England. As a result, the English cloth trade was depressed for decades.

=== Later life ===
William Baffin was equipped for one of his northern voyages by Cockayne and others of the Merchant Adventurers' Company and a harbour in Greenland was named in his honour, called 'Cockin's Sound' on the Admiralty chart.

He bought estates at Denchworth, Berkshire (now Oxfordshire); Elmesthorpe, Leicestershire and Rushton Hall in Rushton, Northamptonshire which were later the homes of his descendants. He gave each of his six daughters £10,000 on marriage, leaving his son an annual rent roll of above £12,000.

He died on 20 October 1626, in his sixty-sixth year, at his manor house at Comb Nevill in Kingston, Surrey, and was buried in Old St Paul's Cathedral, where his funeral sermon was preached by John Donne and a monument was raised to him. The grave and monument were destroyed in the Great Fire of London in 1666. His name appears on a modern monument in the crypt, listing important graves lost in the fire.

== Family ==
He married Mary Morris (who, after Cockayne's death married The Earl of Dover) on 22 June 1596 in London, and they had seven children together:

- Charles Cockayne, 1st Viscount Cullen
- Anne Cockayne (born 1604), who married Sir Hatton Fermor, ancestor of the Earls of Pomfret
- Martha Cockayne (1605–1641), who married first John Ramsay, 1st Earl of Holderness, second Montagu Bertie, 2nd Earl of Lindsey
- Jane Cockayne (born 1609), who married Hon. James Sheffield, son of the Earl of Mulgrave
- Elizabeth Cockayne (1609–1668), who married Thomas Fanshawe, 1st Viscount Fanshawe
- Abigail Cockayne (1610–1687), who married John Carey, 2nd Earl of Dover
- Mary Cockayne, who married Charles Howard, 2nd Earl of Nottingham

His widow remarried, 6 July 1630, Henry Carey, 4th Baron Hunsdon, 1st Earl of Dover, a great-great grandson of Thomas Boleyn, 1st Earl of Wiltshire, father of Anne Boleyn and, dying 24 December 1648, was buried with her first husband at St. Paul's.

== Sources ==
- List of Lord Mayors of London
- Astrid Friis. Alderman Cockayne's Project and the Cloth Trade. London: Milford, 1927.
- J P Sommerville's 'The Rule of the Howards'
- Joel D. Benson. Changes and Expansion in the English Cloth Trade in the Seventeenth Century: Alderman Cockayne's Project. Lewiston, NY: Edwin Mellen Press, 2002.

Civic offices
Preceded by Sebastian Harvey	Lord Mayor of the City of London; 1619	Succeeded by Sir Francis Jones
