= Sebastian Harvey =

English merchant

Sir Sebastian Harvey (died 21 February 1621) was an English merchant who was Lord Mayor of London in 1618.

Harvey was the son of Sir James Harvey who was Lord Mayor in 1581. He became a city of London merchant and a member of the Worshipful Company of Ironmongers. In 1600, he was Master of the Ironmongers Company. On 14 March 1609, he was elected an alderman of the City of London for Billingsgate ward. He was Sheriff of London for the years 1609 to 1610. He was knighted on 17 July 1616. In 1618 he was elected Lord Mayor of London. In 1619 he became alderman for Cheap ward.

Civic offices
Preceded by George Bolles	Lord Mayor of the City of London; 1618	Succeeded by Sir William Cockayne
