= Charles Cary, 9th Viscount Falkland =

Scottish peer and naval officer

Charles John Cary, 9th Viscount Falkland
- Born: November 1768; Scotland
- Died: 2 March 1809 (aged 40)
- Spouse: Christiana Anton (m. 1802)
- Children: 4, including Lucius and Plantagenet
- Father: Lucius Cary
- Relatives: Henry Cary (brother); Lucius Cary (grandfather); Byron Cary (grandson)
- Military career
- Service / branch: Royal Navy
- Rank: Post-captain
- Commands: HMS Busy; HMS Quebec

Captain Charles John Cary, 9th Viscount Falkland (November 1768 – 2 March 1809) was a Scottish peer and Royal Navy officer.

== Biography ==
Cary was the younger son of Lucius Cary, Master of Falkland and his wife Anne. He succeeded his elder brother Henry Cary, 8th Viscount Falkland in the peerage in 1796.

He commanded HMS Busy, which captured the San Telmo in the West Indies in 1801.

On 25 August 1802, he married Christiana Anton (d. 25 July 1822), by whom he had three sons and one daughter:

- Lucius Cary, 10th Viscount Falkland (1803–1884)
- Admiral Plantagenet Cary, 11th Viscount Falkland (1806–1886)
- Capt. Hon. Byron Charles Ferdinand Plantagenet Cary, RN (5 October 1808 – 21 February 1874)
- Hon. Emma Christiana Cary (d. 11 January 1827)

Cary reached the rank of post-captain in 1803. In 1807, while commanding HMS Quebec, Cary took the surrender of the Danish lieutenant commanding the garrison of Heligoland. However, he was dismissed from the ship shortly thereafter, having been convicted at a court-martial of drunkenness and ungentlemanlike behavior.

After a drunken quarrel with Arthur Annesley Powell, the two fought a duel on 28 February 1809, in which Falkland was shot through the groin and mortally wounded. He was taken back to Powell's house, where he died two days later. He was succeeded by his eldest son, Lucius Cary, 10th Viscount Falkland.

Peerage of Scotland
Preceded by Henry Cary	Viscount Falkland; 1796–1809	Succeeded by Lucius Cary
