= Plantagenet Cary, 11th Viscount Falkland =

Royal Navy Admiral (1806–1886)

Admiral The Right Honourable The Viscount Falkland
- Born: 8 September 1806
- Died: 1 February 1886 (aged 79)
- Education: Royal Naval College
- Spouse: Mary Ann Maubert (m. 1843; died 1863)
- Father: Charles Cary
- Relatives: Lucius Cary (brother); Byron Cary (nephew)
- Military career
- Branch: Royal Navy
- Rank: Admiral
- Units: Phaeton; Boadicea; Warspite; Wellesley; Dartmouth; Prince Regent; Ocean; Conway; Spartiate
- Commands: Comus
- Conflicts: First Anglo-Burmese War

Admiral Plantagenet Pierrepont Cary, 11th Viscount Falkland (8 September 1806 – 1 February 1886) was a Royal Navy officer who served in the First Anglo-Burmese War.

== Biography ==
Cary was the second son of Charles Cary, 9th Viscount Falkland and his wife Christiana Anson. The 9th Viscount was a Royal Navy captain who died in 1808 of wounds sustained in a duel. Plantagenet Cary entered the Royal Naval College on 10 August 1820 and shipped as a midshipman aboard the fifth-rate HMS Phaeton and saw service in the West Indies and the Mediterranean. In 1824, he transferred to another fifth-rate, Boadicea, and served in her boats during the First Anglo-Burmese War.

Leaving the East Indies, he joined Warspite and later Wellesley in the Mediterranean, the latter the flagship of Rear Admiral Sir Frederick Maitland. Cary passed his examination for lieutenant in 1827, and on 2 December 1829, took up a lieutenancy in Dartmouth. On 24 November 1830, he was appointed to Prince Regent, the flagship of Vice-Admiral Sir John Beresford at Sheerness, and followed Sir John's flag to Ocean on 27 January 1832. He was appointed to the new sixth-rate Conway on 13 June 1833 under Henry Eden, and on 10 March 1834, to Spartiate, flagship of Rear Admiral Sir Michael Seymour on the South American Station.

He obtained his second commission on 31 October 1834. On 23 February 1837, he was appointed to the command of the sloop Comus in the West Indies. Under his command, she captured the slaver Ingemane on 21 September 1837. Cary was promoted to post-captain on 9 May 1839 and went on half-pay. He married Mary Ann Maubert (d. 2 January 1863) on 27 April 1843; they had no children. Through promotions on the retired list, he rose to become an admiral in 1870.

He succeeded as Viscount Falkland upon the death of his brother Lucius Cary, 10th Viscount Falkland in 1884, but he himself died on 1 February 1886. The title passed to his nephew, Byron Cary.

Peerage of Scotland
Preceded by Lucius Cary	Viscount Falkland; 1884–1886	Succeeded by Byron Cary
