= Viscount Falkland =

Hereditary title in the Peerage of Scotland

Viscountcy of Falkland
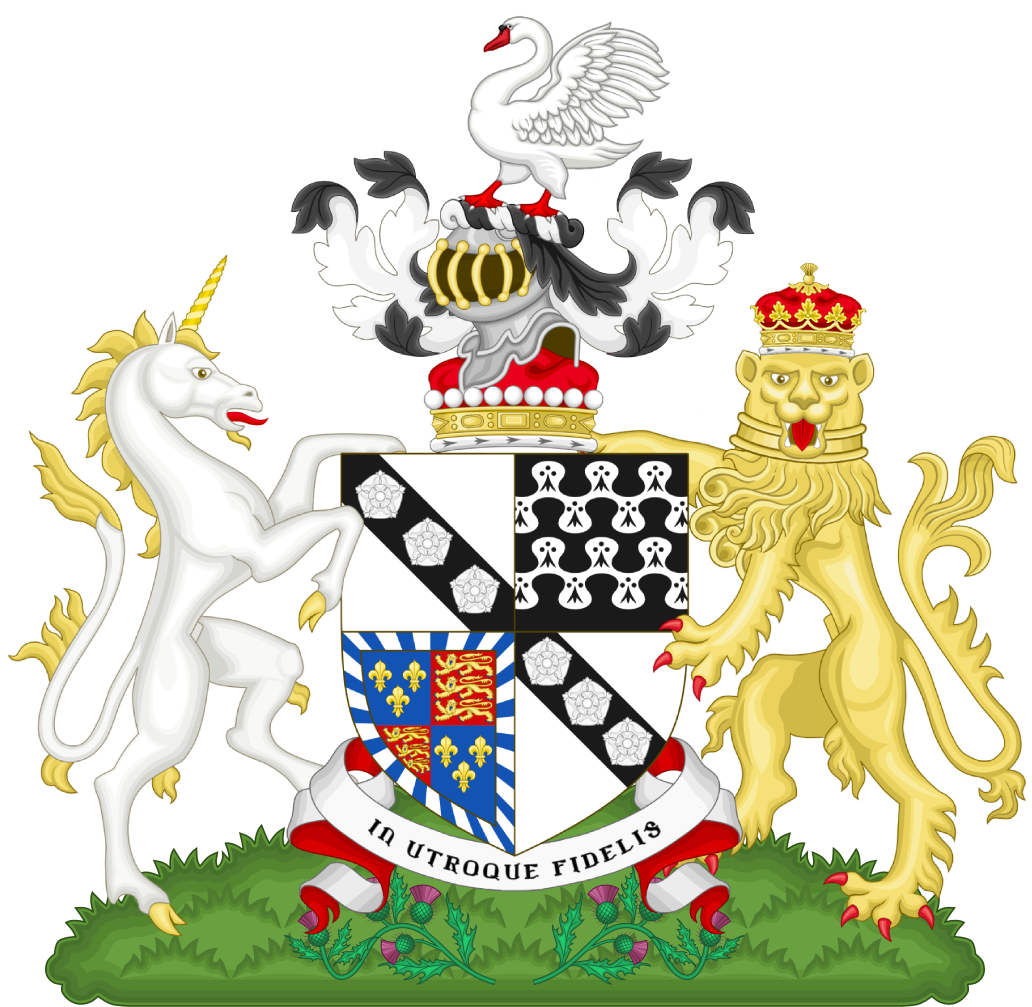
- Quarterly: 1st and 4th, Argent on a Bend Sable three Roses of the field barbed and seeded proper (Cary); 2nd, Sable two Bars nebuly Ermine (Spencer of Ashbury, Devon); 4th, France and England quarterly with a Bordure compony Argent and Azure (Beaufort)
- Creation date: 1620
- Created by: James VI
- Peerage: Peerage of Scotland
- First holder: Henry Cary
- Present holder: Lucius Cary
- Heir apparent: Alexander Cary
- Status: Extant
- Motto: In Utroque Fidelis ("Faithful in Both")

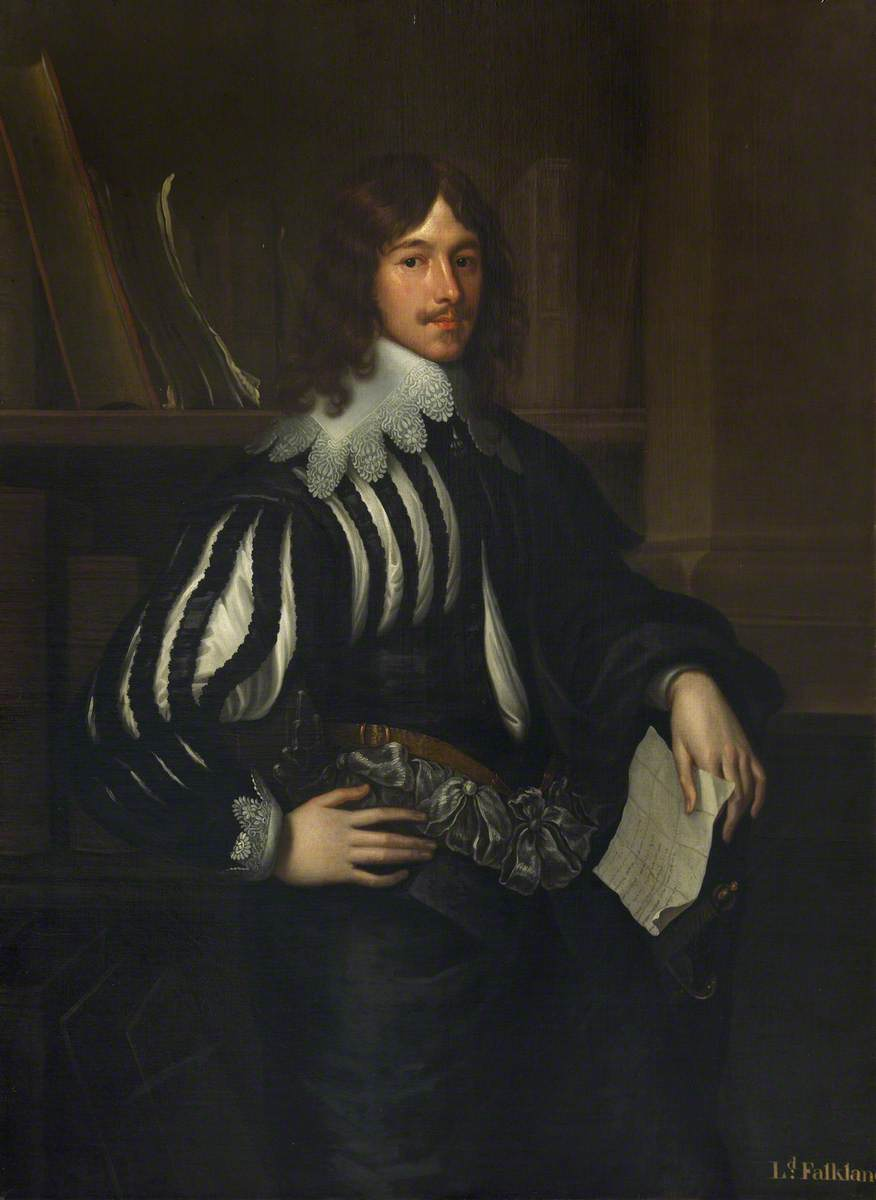
Lucius Cary, 2nd Viscount Falkland

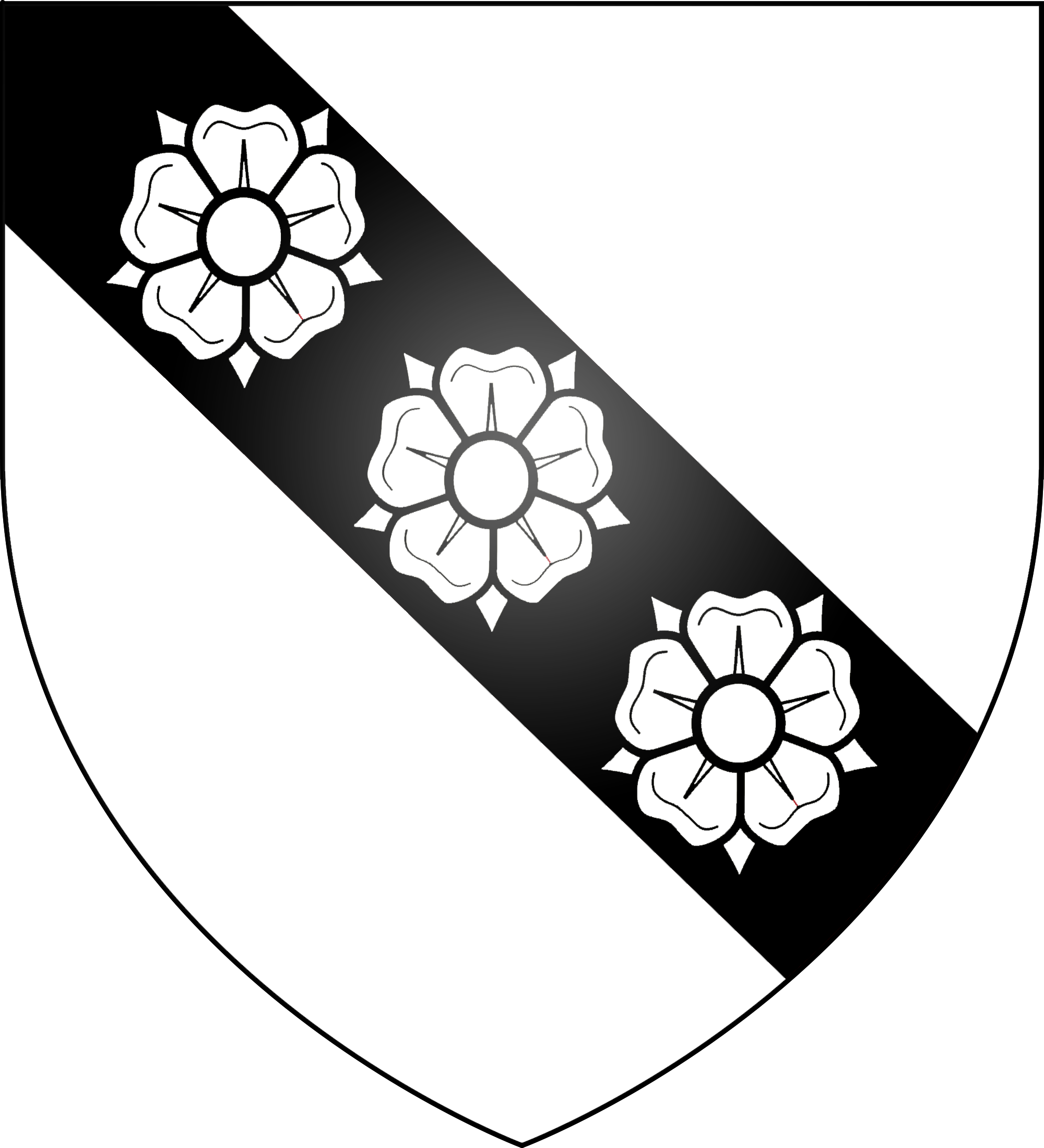
Arms of Cary: Argent, on a bend sable three roses of the field

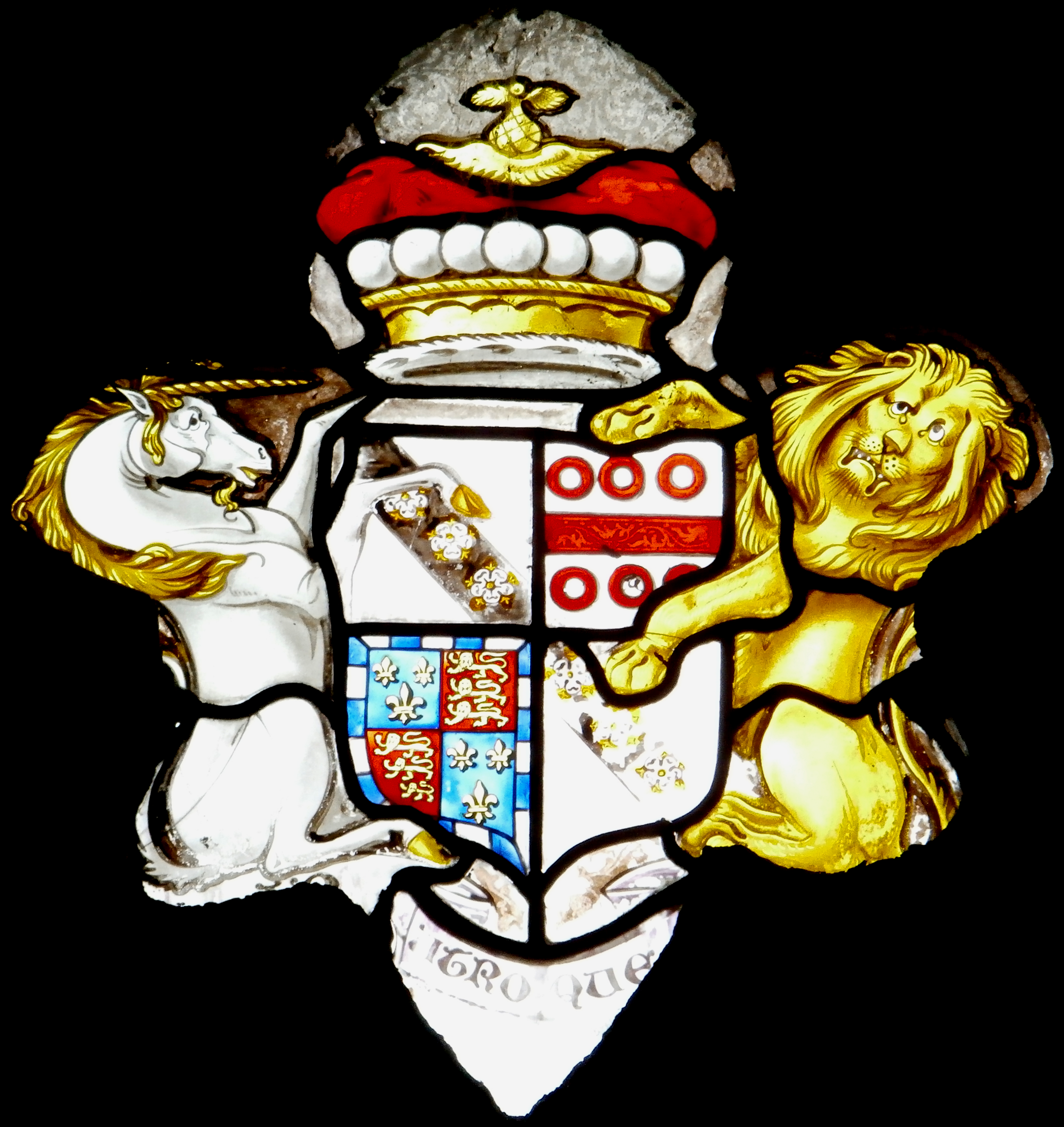
Stained-glass heraldic achievement of Lucius Cary, 6th Viscount Falkland (1687–1730), on the south chancel window in All Saints Church, Clovelly, Devon

Viscount Falkland is a title in the Peerage of Scotland. The name refers to the royal burgh of Falkland in Fife.

== History ==
The title was created in 1620 by King James VI for Sir Henry Cary, a member of the Cary family. He was born in Hertfordshire and had no previous connection to Scotland. He was made Lord Cary at the same time, also in the Peerage of Scotland. His son, the second Viscount, was a prominent statesman. The latter's younger son, the fourth Viscount (who succeeded his elder brother), notably served as Lord Lieutenant of Oxfordshire. His son, the fifth Viscount, represented several constituencies in the House of Commons and held office as First Lord of the Admiralty from 1693 to 1694. The Falkland Islands in the south Atlantic are named after him.

Upon his death, the line of the second Viscount failed and the titles were inherited by the fifth Viscount's second cousin, the sixth Viscount. He was the grandson of the Hon. Patrick Cary, fifth son of the first Viscount. A lifelong adherent of the exiled Royal Family of Stuart, he was created Earl of Falkland in the Jacobite Peerage on 13 December 1722 by James Francis Edward Stuart (recognised by Jacobites as "King James VIII / III"). He also embraced the Roman Catholic faith. His great-great-grandson, the tenth Viscount, was a colonial administrator and Liberal politician. In 1832, he was created Baron Hunsdon, of Scutterskelfe in the County of York, in the Peerage of the United Kingdom (he was son-in-law of then King William IV). This title gave him an automatic seat in the House of Lords but became extinct on his death in 1884. The Scottish titles were inherited by his younger brother, the eleventh Viscount. He was an Admiral in the Royal Navy.

His nephew, the twelfth Viscount, sat in the House of Lords as a Scottish representative peer from 1894 to 1922. He was succeeded by his son, the thirteenth Viscount, who also sat as a Representative Peer between 1922 and 1931. As of 2023, the titles are held by the latter's grandson, the fifteenth Viscount, who succeeded his father in 1984. He was one of the ninety hereditary peers elected to remain in the House of Lords after the passing of the House of Lords Act 1999; he sat as a Crossbencher until his retirement in 2023.

Theoretically, all viscountcies in the Peerage of Scotland have "of" in their titles, but as with other British viscountcies, Scottish viscounts have dropped the practice of using "of." The only exceptions to this usage are the Viscount of Arbuthnott and, to a lesser extent, the Viscount of Oxfuird.

There is a statue of Viscount Falkland in St Stephens Hall, in the Houses of Parliament. On 27 April 1909, a suffragette named Marjory Hume chained herself to the statue, shouting "Deeds not words". When the chains were removed, the top half of the spur on Falkland's right boot was broken off; the damage can be seen to this day. It is a common misconception that Falkland's sword was broken during this incident. Instead, the sword broke shortly after the statue was installed in St Stephens Hall.

== Viscounts (of) Falkland (1620) ==
- Henry Cary, 1st Viscount Falkland (c. 1575 – 1633)
- Lucius Cary, 2nd Viscount Falkland (1610–1643)
- Lucius Cary, 3rd Viscount Falkland (1632–1649)
- Henry Cary, 4th Viscount Falkland (1634–1663)
- Anthony Cary, 5th Viscount Falkland (1656–1694)
- Lucius Henry Cary, 6th Viscount Falkland (1687–1730)
- Lucius Charles Cary, 7th Viscount Falkland (c. 1707 – 1785)
- Henry Thomas Cary, 8th Viscount Falkland (1766–1796)
- Charles John Cary, 9th Viscount Falkland (1768–1809)
- Lucius Bentinck Cary, 10th Viscount Falkland (1803–1884)
- Plantagenet Pierrepont Cary, 11th Viscount Falkland (1806–1886)
- Byron Plantagenet Cary, 12th Viscount Falkland (1845–1922)
- Lucius Plantagenet Cary, 13th Viscount Falkland (1880–1961)
- Lucius Henry Charles Plantagenet Cary, 14th Viscount Falkland (1905–1984)
- Lucius Edward William Plantagenet Cary, 15th Viscount Falkland (b. 1935)

The heir apparent is the present holder's son, Hon. Lucius Alexander Plantagenet Cary, Master of Falkland (b. 1963)
The heir apparent’s heir apparent is his son, Lucius Jackson Arthur Plantagenet Cary (b. 1995)
