= William Heveningham =

English politician (1604-1678)

William Heveningham

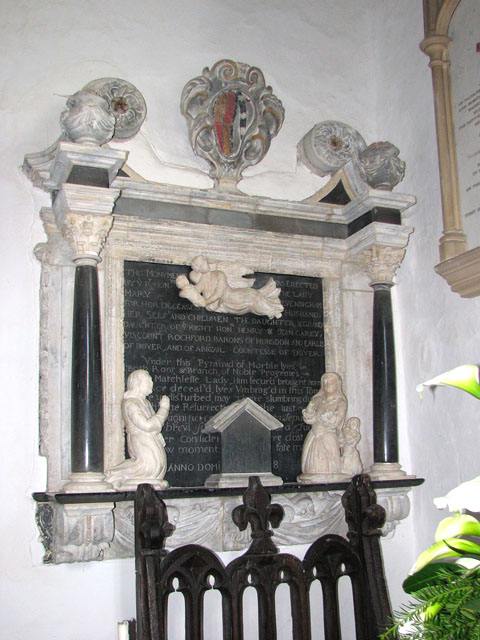
Mural monument to William Heveningham, St Peter's Church, Ketteringham, Norfolk

William Heveningham (1604–1678) was an English politician who sat in the House of Commons from 1640 to 1653. He supported the Parliamentary cause in the English Civil War and was one of the Regicides of Charles I of England.

== Political life ==
The son of Sir John Heveningham, he was High Sheriff of Norfolk in 1633. In April 1640, he was elected Member of Parliament for Stockbridge in the Short Parliament. He was re-elected MP for Stockbridge for the Long Parliament in November 1640 and sat until 1653 in the Rump Parliament. He served on committee of Eastern Association in 1646.

A member of high court he refused to sign the death-warrant of Charles I in 1649. He was a member of council of state in 1649 and was appointed Vice-Admiral of the Coast for Suffolk in 1651.

At the Restoration Heveningham's life was saved by the exertions of his wife's relations in 1661. He was imprisoned at Windsor in 1664.

== Family life ==
Heveningham married firstly Katherine Walop, d. 1648, daughter of Sir Henry Wallop. They had three children:

- Elizabeth Heveningham, b. 1639 in Heveningham, Suffolk, England
- John Heveningham, b. 1641 in Heveningham, Suffolk, England
- Bridget Heveningham, b. 1642 in Heveningham, Suffolk, England

In 1655, Heveningham married Mary Carey, 1631–1696, daughter of John Carey, 2nd Earl of Dover. They had two children:

- William Heveningham, d. 1675, married Barbara Villiers, daughter of George Villiers, 4th Viscount Grandison
- Abigail Heveningham, 1660–1686, married Sir John Newton, 3rd Baronet of Barrs Court. They were the maternal grandparents of Thomas Coke, 1st Earl of Leicester of Holkham Hall

== See also ==
- List of regicides of Charles I

== Notes ==
Parliament of England
Parliament suspended since 1629	Member of Parliament for Stockbridge; 1640–1653; With: William Jephson	Not represented in Barebones Parliament
