= Byron Cary, 12th Viscount Falkland =

Scottish peer and British Army officer (1845–1922)

- Born: 3 April 1845
- Died: 10 January 1922 (aged 76)
- Education: Royal Military College, Sandhurst
- Spouse: Mary Reade (m. 1879)
- Children: 6, including Lucius and Philip
- Relatives: Charles Cary (grandfather); Lucius Cary (uncle); Plantagenet Cary (uncle)
- Military career
- Branch: British Army
- Rank: Lieutenant-Colonel
- Units: 49th Regiment of Foot; 35th Regiment of Foot; Royal Sussex Regiment; North Riding of Yorkshire; 4th (Militia) Battalion

Byron Plantagenet Cary, 12th Viscount Falkland (3 April 1845 – 10 January 1922) was a Scottish peer and British Army officer.

== Biography ==
Cary was the eldest son of Capt. Byron Cary, the third son of Capt. Charles Cary, 9th Viscount Falkland.

Cary was educated at the Royal Military College, Sandhurst, and on 4 August 1863, purchased an ensigncy in the 49th Regiment of Foot. He was promoted lieutenant on 9 August 1867, and exchanged into the 35th Regiment of Foot on 23 October. He was subsequently promoted captain on 24 November 1877,

Cary married Mary, daughter of Robert Reade, Esq., of New York, on 25 September 1879. They had three sons and three daughters:

- Lucius Cary, 13th Viscount Falkland (1880–1961)
- Hon. Catherine Mary Cary (29 May 1882 – 16 October 1972), married Godfrey Dalrymple-White in 1912
- Hon. Mary Selina Cary (10 November 1884 – 6 November 1960)
- Lt-Cdr The Hon. Byron Plantagenet Cary, DSO (25 January 1887 – 16 September 1917), lost commanding HMS G9
- Hon. Lettice Cary (29 September 1888 – 19 December 1963), married in 1918 Commander Ralph Neville (1887–1936) and in 1937 Major Philip Pearson-Gregory
- Hon. Philip Plantagenet Cary (1895–1968)

Cary was seconded for staff service on 10 April 1880. He was subsequently promoted to major in his regiment, which became the Royal Sussex Regiment during the Childers Reforms of 1881, and served as aide-de-camp to Major-General Percy Feilding in Malta. Cary retired on 5 March 1884 with the honorary rank of lieutenant-colonel. In 1886, he succeeded his uncle, Admiral Plantagenet Cary, 11th Viscount Falkland, in the peerage.

In April 1893, he was appointed a deputy lieutenant of the North Riding of Yorkshire, and was lieutenant-colonel commandant of the 4th (North York Militia) Battalion, Green Howards, from 6 October 1891 until his retirement on 10 November 1896, being granted the honorary rank of colonel in 1893. Falkland was elected a representative peer for Scotland in 1894, and sat in the House of Lords until his death. He retired from the Army on 11 November 1896. Falkland died in 1922, and was succeeded by his eldest son Lucius Cary, 13th Viscount Falkland.

Peerage of Scotland
Preceded by Plantagenet Cary	Viscount Falkland; 1886–1922	Succeeded by Lucius Cary
