= Henry Cary, 8th Viscount Falkland =

Scottish peer and soldier

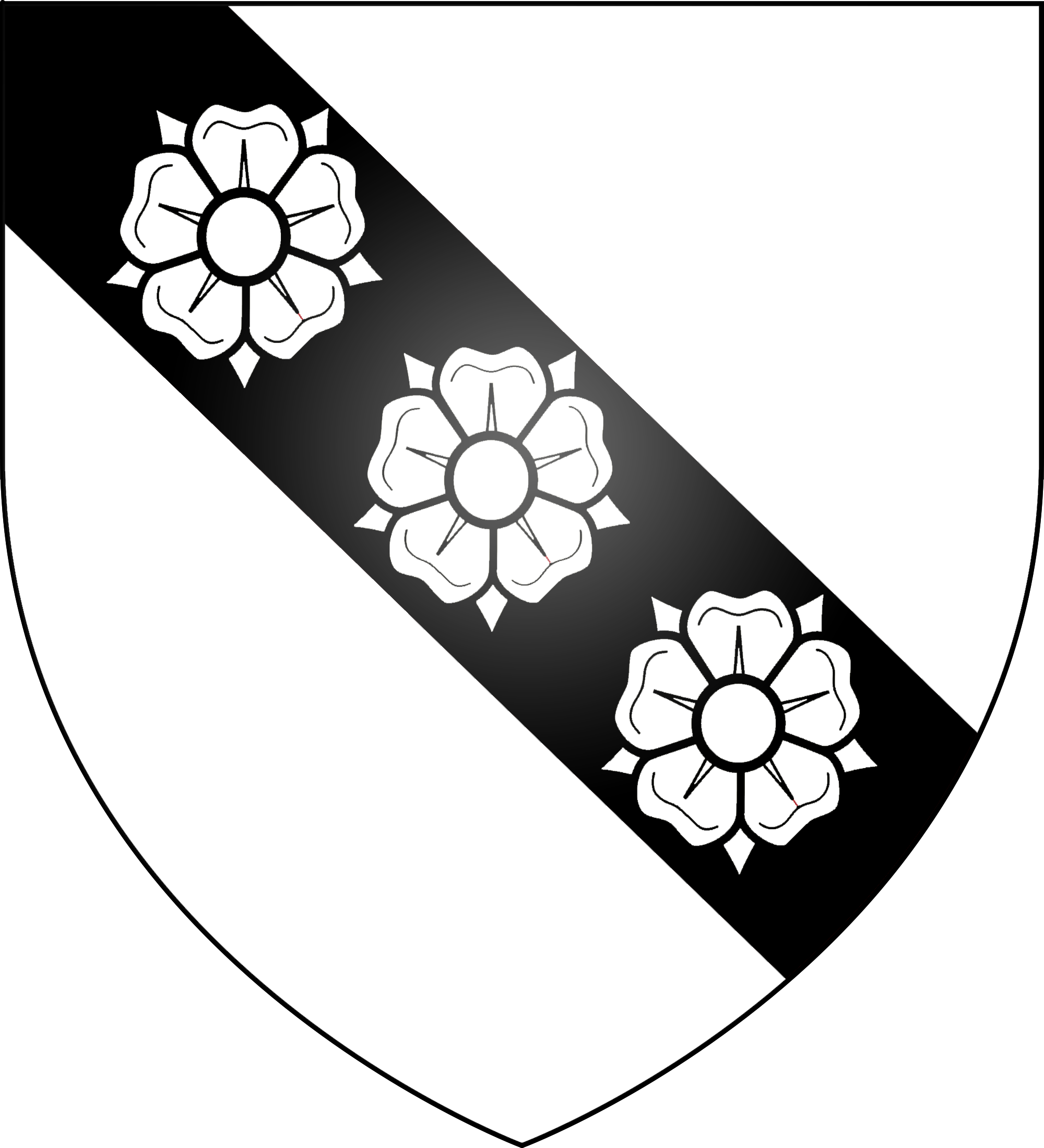
- Carey family Arms
- Born: 27 February 1766
- Died: 28 May 1796 (aged 30); Bath, Somerset, England
- Father: Lucius Cary
- Relatives: Lucius Cary (grandfather); Charles Cary (brother)
- Military career
- Branch: British Army
- Rank: Lieutenant
- Units: 19th Regiment of Light Dragoons; 10th Regiment of Dragoons; 100th Regiment of Foot; 43rd Regiment of Foot; 65th Regiment of Foot; 12th Regiment of Foot

Henry Thomas Cary, 8th Viscount Falkland (27 February 1766 – 28 May 1796), styled Master of Falkland from 1780 to 1785, was a Scottish peer and British Army officer.

== Biography ==
Cary was the elder son of Lucius Cary, Master of Falkland and his wife Anne. He became the heir apparent to his grandfather, Lucius Cary, 7th Viscount Falkland after his father died in 1780, and succeeded his grandfather in the peerage on 27 February 1785.

He was commissioned a cornet in the 19th Regiment of Light Dragoons on 13 September 1783, but the regiment was disbanded shortly thereafter and he went on half-pay. On 10 September 1785, he exchanged into the 10th Regiment of Dragoons. He was promoted lieutenant in the 100th Regiment of Foot on 10 December. That regiment, too, was disbanded, and he went on half-pay again, but on 5 April 1786, he exchanged into the 43rd Regiment of Foot. He exchanged onto the half-pay of the 65th Regiment of Foot on 25 December 1787. On 27 January 1790, he exchanged into the 12th Regiment of Foot, and retired from the Army as a lieutenant in December. He was offered an ensign's commission in the 43rd again on 7 November 1793, but declined.

Falkland died unmarried at the White Lion Inn in Bath, Somerset on 28 May 1796 and was buried in that city. He was succeeded by his brother Charles Cary, 9th Viscount Falkland.

Peerage of Scotland
Preceded by Lucius Cary	Viscount Falkland; 1785–1796	Succeeded by Charles Cary
