= Lucius Cary, 15th Viscount Falkland =

British Viscount (born 1935)

The Right Honourable The Viscount of Falkland
- Coat of arms

Member of the House of Lords
- Lord Temporal
- Hereditary peerage 27 April 1984 – 11 November 1999
- Preceded by: The 14th Viscount Falkland
- Succeeded by: Seat abolished
- Elected Hereditary Peer; 11 November 1999 – 21 March 2023
- Election: 1999
- Preceded by: Seat established
- Succeeded by: The 7th Earl Russell

Personal details
- Born: Lucius Edward William Plantagenet Cary; 8 May 1935 (age 91)
- Party: SDP (until 1988); Liberal Democrats (1988–2011); Crossbench (from 2011)
- Spouse(s): (1) Caroline Anne Butler; (2) Nicole Mackey
- Children: 5, including Alexander
- Parent: Lucius Cary (father)
- Education: Wellington College

Lucius Edward William Plantagenet Cary, 15th Viscount of Falkland (born 8 May 1935), styled Master of Falkland from 1961 to 1984, is a British nobleman and former politician.

== Background and education ==
Cary is the youngest of three children, and the only son of Lucius Cary, 14th Viscount of Falkland, and Constance Mary Berry, daughter of Captain Edward Berry. The Falkland viscountcy is the senior viscountcy in the Peerage of Scotland, created in 1620 by King James VI.

Cary was educated at Wellington College in Berkshire, and was formerly an officer in the Hussars.

== Political career ==
Cary succeeded his father in the viscountcy in 1984 and sat in the House of Lords with the Social Democratic Party (SDP), later joining the Liberal Democrats. Following the removal of the majority of hereditary peers under the House of Lords Act 1999, he was one of the ninety-two elected to remain. In 2011 Falkland left the Liberal Democrats and sat as a Crossbencher until his retirement in 2023. He is a patron of Humanists UK, and has been a vice-president of the Royal Stuart Society since 2015 (his ancestors were ardent Jacobites, and he holds the title of 10th Earl of Falkland in the Jacobite Peerage).

== Family ==
The Viscount married Caroline Anne Butler, daughter of Lieut-Cmdr George Butler, in 1962; they were divorced in 1990. They have four children:

- Hon. Lucius Alexander Plantagenet Cary, Master of Falkland (born 1 February 1963)
- Hon. Camilla Anne Cary (3 February 1965 – 6 June 1972)
- Hon. Samantha Camilla Cary (born 30 March 1973)
- Hon. Lucinda Mary Cary (born 11 December 1974)

He was married again in 1990 to Nicole Mackey, with whom he has one child:

- Hon. Charles Byron Milburn Cary (born 27 April 1992)

== Arms ==
Coat of arms of Lucius Cary, 15th Viscount Falkland
Coronet The coronet of a viscount Crest A Swan wings elevated proper Escutcheon Quarterly: 1st and 4th, Argent on a Bend Sable three Roses of the field barbed and seeded proper (Cary); 2nd, Sable two Bars nebuly Ermine (Spencer of Ashbury, Devon); 4th, France and England quarterly with a Bordure compony Argent and Azure (Beaufort) Supporters Dexter: a Unicorn Argent armed crined tufted and unguled Or; Sinister: a Lion guardant proper ducally crowned and gorged with a Plain Collar Or Motto In Utroque Fidelis (Latin for 'Faithful in both')

Peerage of Scotland
Preceded by Lucius Cary	Viscount of Falkland; 1984–present Member of the House of Lords (1984–1999)	Incumbent
Parliament of the United Kingdom
New office created by the House of Lords Act 1999	Elected hereditary peer to the House of Lords under the House of Lords Act 1999; 1999–2023	Succeeded by The Earl Russell
