= Viscount Rochford =

Aristocratic title in the Peerage of England

Viscount Rochford is a title that has been created twice in the Peerage of England.

The first creation was made in favour of Sir Thomas Boleyn in 1525 by King Henry VIII. The title was taken from Boleyn's Rochford Hall country estate in Essex. In 1529, Thomas was promoted even further when the King created him Earl of Wiltshire. In that same year, Thomas also inherited the wealth and title of his mother's ancestors, the Earls of Ormond. Thus, Thomas's only son, George became known by the courtesy title of Viscount Rochford.

The title fell out of use as a courtesy title in 1536 when George Boleyn was executed on false charges of treason. It became extinct when Thomas died in 1539. In 1542, Jane Boleyn, Viscountess Rochford, George's widow, was also executed after she was implicated in the fall of Queen Catherine Howard.

The title was recreated in 1619 for Thomas Boleyn's great-great-grandson Henry Carey, 4th Baron Hunsdon, who was created Earl of Dover in 1628. Both titles became extinct on the death of the second Earl in 1677.

== Viscounts Rochford, 1st creation (1525) ==
- Thomas Boleyn, 1st Earl of Wiltshire and 1st Earl of Ormond (c. 1477-1539)

== Viscounts Rochford, 2nd creation (1619) ==
- Henry Carey, 1st Earl of Dover (c. 1580–1666)
- John Carey, 2nd Earl of Dover (1608-1677)
