= Alexander Cary, Master of Falkland =

English screenwriter, producer, and ex-soldier

Alexander Cary
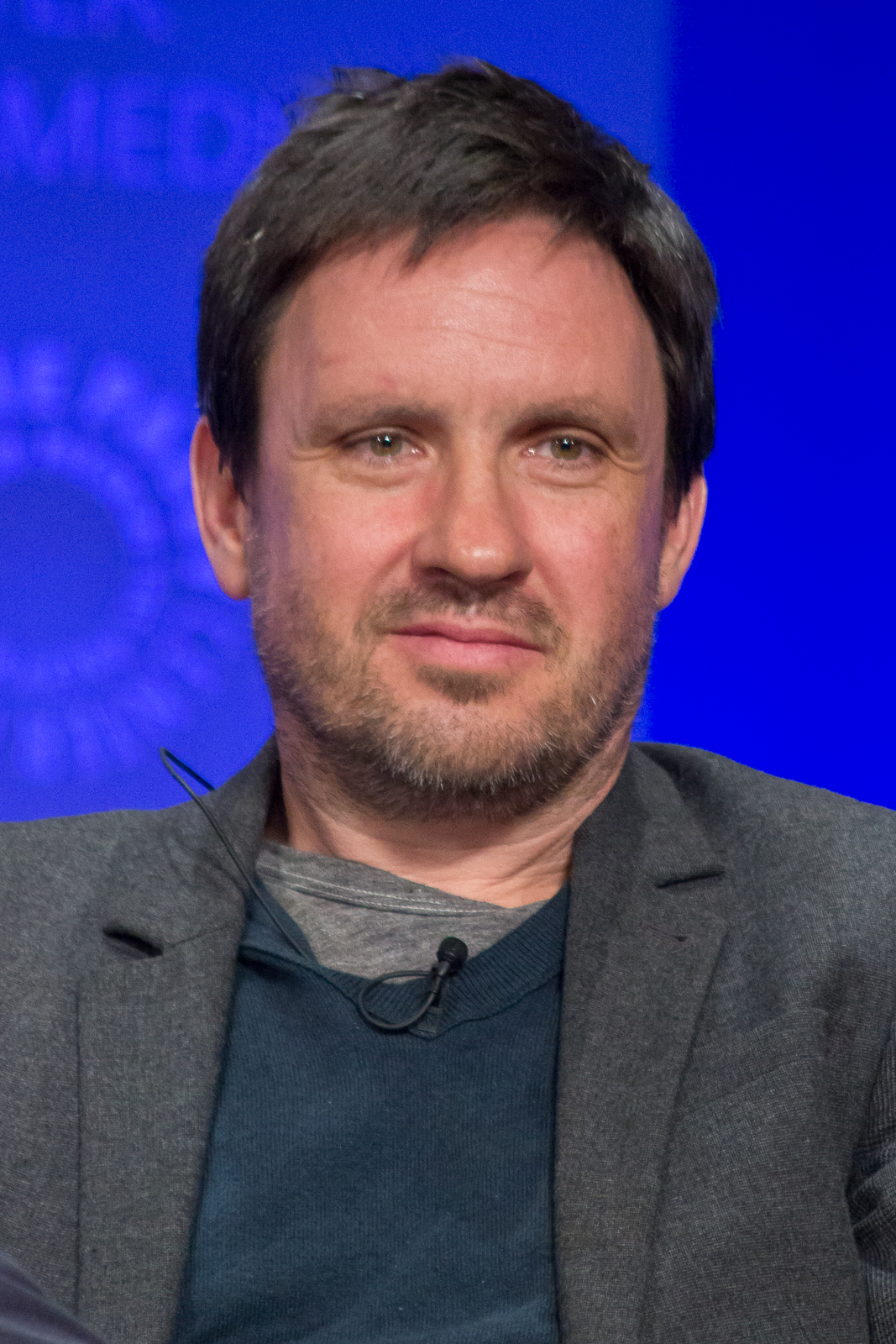
- Cary at PaleyFest in 2015
- Born: Lucius Alexander Plantagenet Cary; 1 February 1963 (age 63); Hammersmith, London, England
- Education: Royal Military Academy Sandhurst
- Occupations: Television writer, producer
- Spouses: Linda Purl (m. 1993, divorced) Jennifer Marsala (m. 2013)
- Children: 2
- Parent(s): Lucius Cary, 15th Viscount Falkland; Caroline Butler
- Military career
- Allegiance: United Kingdom
- Branch: British Army
- Unit: Scots Guards
- Conflicts: Northern Ireland Troubles; Gulf War

Lucius Alexander Plantagenet Cary, Master of Falkland (born 1 February 1963), is an English screenwriter, producer and ex-soldier.

== Life and career ==
Cary was born in Hammersmith, London, to Lucius Cary, 15th Viscount Falkland, and Caroline Butler. His father was an elected hereditary peer in the House of Lords, and Cary is next in line to be Viscount Falkland, the senior viscountcy of Scotland (created in 1620 by King James VI).

On 23 July 1993, Cary married American actress Linda Purl, with whom he has a son. He also has a son from another relationship. Purl and Cary later divorced.

In 2013, he became engaged to American actress Jennifer Marsala, a cast member in Homeland. The marriage took place in Somerset on 31 December 2013.

He appeared in the BBC programme The Gift on 10 February 2015, in which he met a fellow ex-soldier who wished to thank him for saving his life.

He is the creator of the 2022 miniseries A Spy Among Friends.
