= Lucius Cary, 14th Viscount Falkland =

Lucius Henry Charles Plantagenet Cary 14th Viscount Falkland
- Born: 25 January 1905
- Died: 16 March 1984 (aged 79)
- Education: Eton College
- Criminal charges: Child sexual abuse
- Spouses: Joan Sylvia Southey (m. 1926; div. 1933) Constance Mary Berry (m. 1933; div. 1958) Charlotte Anne Granville (m. 1958; div. 1974)
- Children: 3
- Parents: Lucius Cary, 13th Viscount Falkland (father); Ella Louise Catford (mother)
- Military career
- Allegiance: United Kingdom
- Branch: Royal Air Force
- Service years: 1941–1945
- Rank: Pilot officer
- Conflicts: World War II

Lucius Henry Charles Plantagenet Cary, 14th Viscount Falkland (25 January 1905 – 16 March 1984), styled Master of Falkland from 1922 to 1961, was a Scottish peer.

The eldest son of Lucius Cary, 13th Viscount Falkland and his wife Ella, Cary was educated at Eton College.

On 14 October 1926, Cary married Joan Sylvia Southey. They had two daughters before divorcing in 1933:

- Hon. Elizabeth-Ann Bevil Cary (20 August 1927 – 2014), married Sir William Nelson, 3rd Baronet on 21 November 1945 and had issue
- Hon. Jean Rosemary Vera Cary (29 October 1928 – 5 June 2019), married Captain Henry Herman Evelyn Montagu Winch (d. 1987) on 14 December 1950

Cary married again on 9 August 1933, to Constance Mary Berry. They had one son:

- Lucius Cary, 15th Viscount Falkland (b. 1935)

On 21 February 1941, he was commissioned as a pilot officer on probation, in the Administrative and Special Duties Branch of the Royal Air Force.

Cary and his second wife were divorced in 1958. He married again on 24 April 1958, to Charlotte Anne Granville. They had no children, and divorced in 1974. He succeeded his father in the peerage in 1961.

In 1979 he was arrested for sexually abusing underage girls. He pled guilty to all the charges and received a six-month suspended sentence and a £1,140 fine.

Falkland died in 1984, and was succeeded by his only son, Lucius Cary, 15th Viscount Falkland.

Peerage of Scotland
Preceded by Lucius Cary	Viscount Falkland; 1961–1984	Succeeded by Lucius Cary
