= Lucius Cary, 13th Viscount Falkland =

Scottish peer and British Army officer (1880–1961)

Lucius Plantagenet Cary OBE
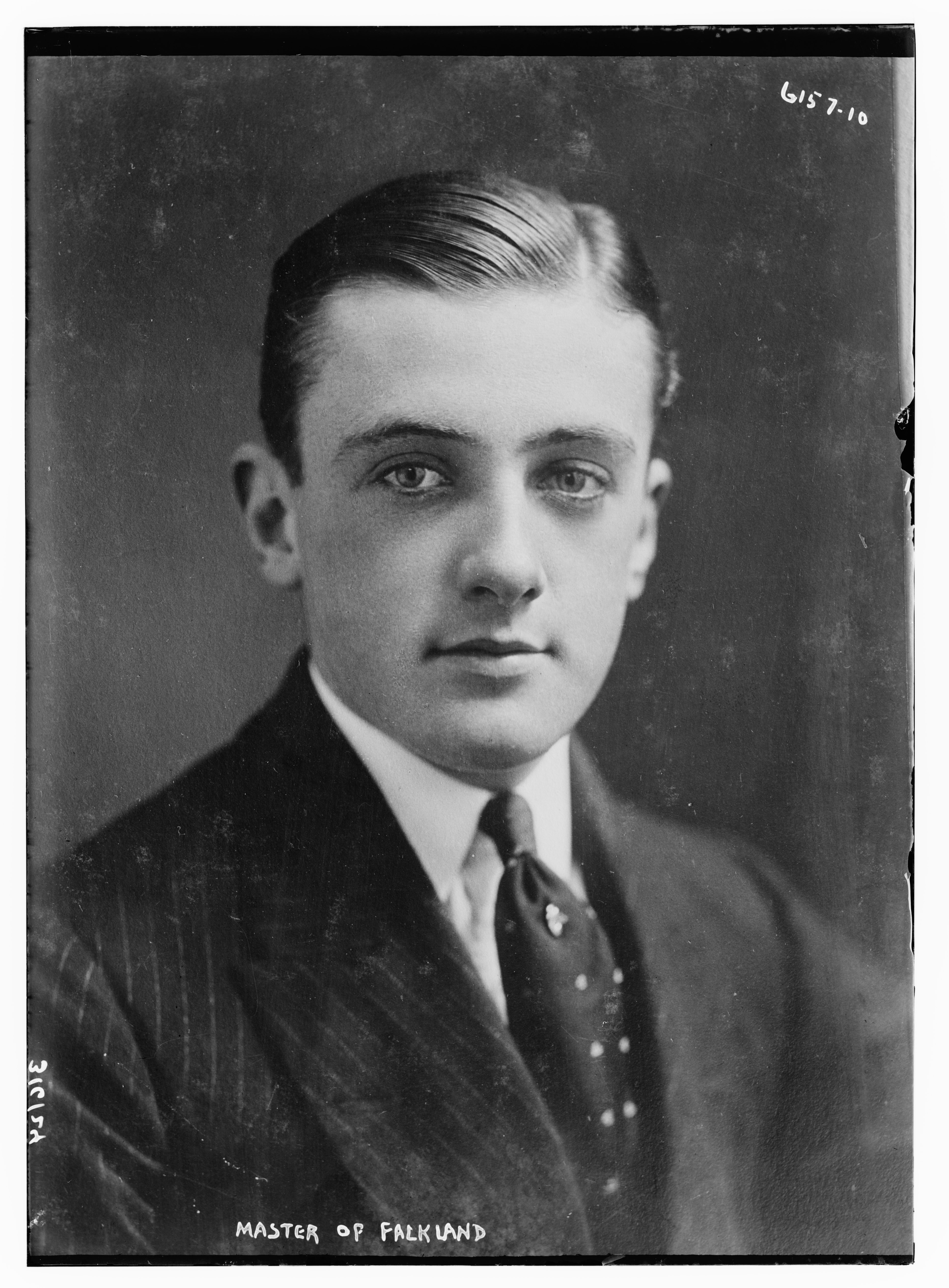
- Born: 23 September 1880
- Died: 24 July 1961 (aged 80)
- Education: Eton College; Royal Military College, Sandhurst
- Spouse: Ella Louise Catford (m. 1904; died 1954)
- Children: 5
- Parents: Byron Cary, 12th Viscount Falkland (father); Mary Reade (mother)
- Military career
- Allegiance: United Kingdom
- Branch: British Army
- Service years: 1899–1919
- Rank: Breveted major
- Unit: Grenadier Guards
- Conflicts: Second Boer War; World War I

Lucius Plantagenet Cary, 13th Viscount Falkland (23 September 1880 – 24 July 1961), styled Master of Falkland from 1886 to 1922, was a Scottish peer. The eldest son of Byron Cary, 12th Viscount Falkland and his wife Mary, née Reade, Cary was educated at Eton College and the Royal Military College, Sandhurst. He was commissioned into the Grenadier Guards on 6 December 1899, and served as a second lieutenant in the 2nd Battalion during the Second Boer War. He was promoted lieutenant by augmentation on 1 April 1903. Cary was seconded to the 3rd King's African Rifles and stationed in Nairobi from 1903 to 1905.

On 6 April 1904, Cary married Ella Louise Catford (d. 4 May 1954). They had three sons and two daughters:

- Lucius Cary, 14th Viscount Falkland (1905–1984)
- Hon. Byron Godfrey Plantagenet Cary (26 June 1908 – 1971), married Daphne Helen King (d. 1997) on 22 June 1932 and had issue
- Hon. Rosemary Sylvia Cary (22 February 1910 – 1992), married John de Perigault Gurney Mayhew, son of John Mayhew, on 17 August 1928 and had issue, divorced 1936, married Major Aubrey Esson-Scott on 6 January 1937
- Hon. Sheila Cary (20 March 1912 – 20 March 1976), married William Philip Neville Edwards on 8 April 1931 and had issue
- Hon. Richard Lorenzo Plantagenet Cary (31 March 1915 – 1991), married Dorothy Denise Lloyd on 31 July 1959

Cary was promoted to captain on 22 January 1908. He resigned his commission on 8 June 1910. Cary then served as Deputy Governor of Wandsworth Prison until 1914, when he returned to the Guards as a captain in the 1st Battalion for the duration of World War I. He then entered the Reserve of Officers and was breveted major on 1 January 1919, and made an Officer of the Order of the British Empire on 3 June 1919, due to his war services.

He succeeded to the peerage on the death of his father in 1922, and was elected a representative peer for Scotland, sitting in the House of Lords until 1931. Falkland died in 1961, and was succeeded by his eldest son Lucius Cary, 14th Viscount Falkland.

Peerage of Scotland
Preceded by Byron Cary	Viscount Falkland; 1922–1961	Succeeded by Lucius Cary
