= Lucius Cary, 6th Viscount Falkland =

Scottish peer and Jacobite

- Born: 27 August 1687; England
- Died: 31 December 1730 (aged 43); Paris, France
- Spouse(s): Dorothy Molyneux (m. 1704; died 1722) Laura Dillon
- Children: 7, including Lucius
- Father: Edward Cary

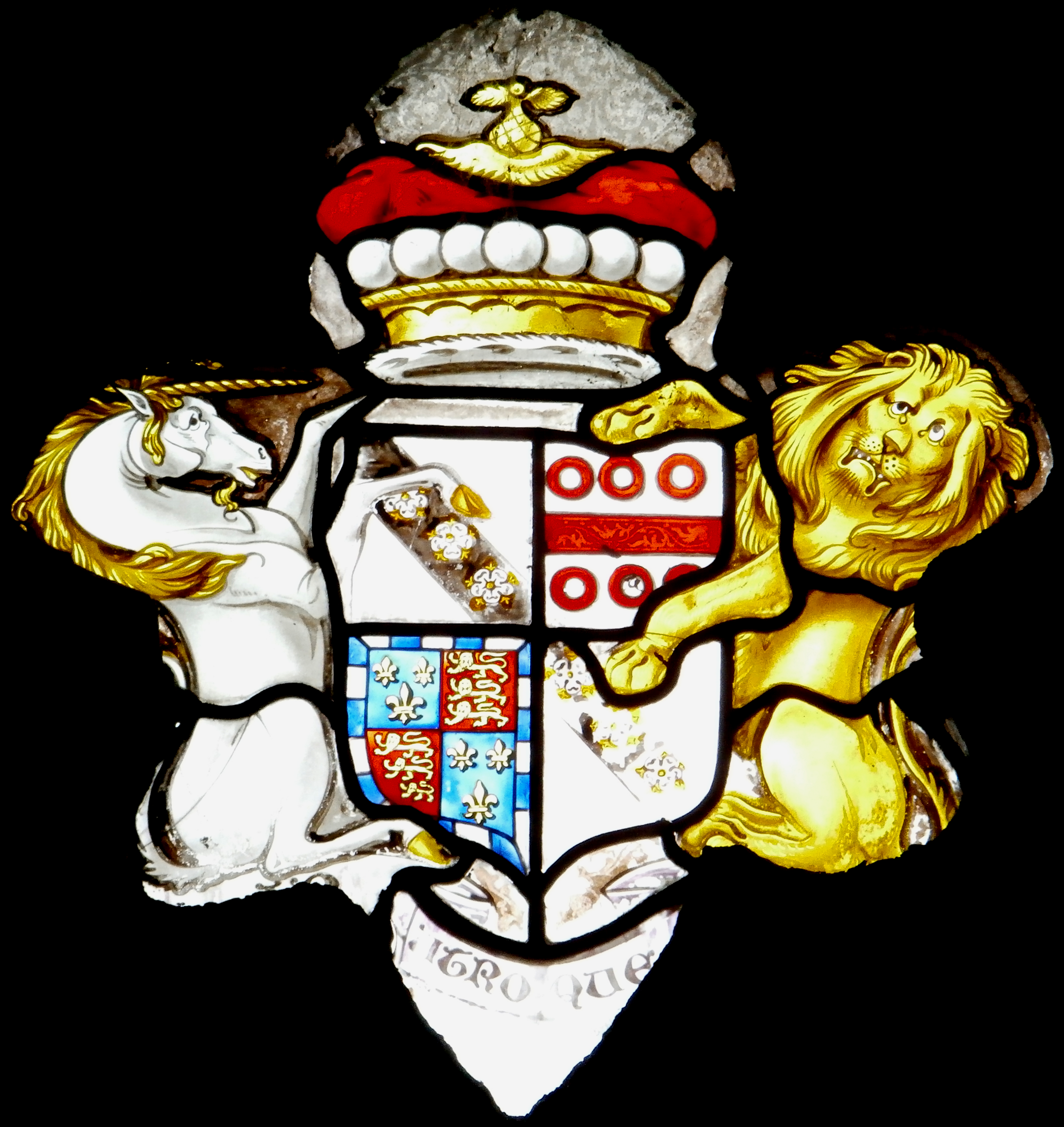
Stained-glass heraldic achievement of Lucius Cary, 6th Viscount Falkland, on the south chancel window in All Saints Church, Clovelly, Devon

Lucius Henry Cary, 6th Viscount Falkland (27 August 1687 – 31 December 1730) was a Scottish peer and Jacobite.

== Biography ==
Cary was the son of Edward Cary (1656–1692), of Caldicot, Monmouthshire, and his wife Anne, the eldest daughter of Charles Lucas, 2nd Baron Lucas. In 1694, he succeeded as Viscount Falkland upon the death of his second cousin, Anthony Cary, 5th Viscount Falkland.

Early in life, his guardian sued on his behalf to obtain the estate of Stanwell, Middlesex. Upon the death of Falkland's first cousin once removed, John Cary, in 1686, he had left that estate in trust to his great-niece, Elizabeth Willoughby, provided that she would marry Lord Guilford within three years of his death; the inheritance was otherwise to go to the 5th Viscount and his heirs, then to Edward Cary and his heirs. Elizabeth's trustees came to an agreement with Falkland and Edward Cary to allow her to enjoy the estate for life, notwithstanding her failure to marry Lord Guilford, and she afterwards married James Bertie. However, the agreement ended upon the deaths of Edward Cary and Falkland, and Lucius' guardian sued in the Court of Chancery, which found in his favor, to obtain the estate. The Berties appealed to the House of Lords, and obtained a compromise which gave Elizabeth a life interest in the estate, with reversion to Lucius.

On 5 October 1704, he married Dorothy Molyneux (d. 26 June 1722) in Chiswick, Middlesex. They had four sons and two daughters:

- Lucius Charles Cary, 7th Viscount Falkland
- General Hon. George Cary (d. 11 April 1792), married Isabella (d. 1799), daughter of Arthur Ingram of Barrowby
- Hon. Leeke Cary (d. 20 March 1729/30), died at Cadiz
- Hon. Henry John Cary (bap. 21 January 1716/7)
- Hon. Frances Cary (bap. 12 January 1718/9 – bur. 14 January 1718/9)
- Hon. Dorothy Cary (bur. 9 February 1719/20)

He served under General Stanhope in Spain, but after the death of Queen Anne, he became a Jacobite. Falkland became an agent of the Old Pretender, under the orders of Arthur Dillon, Count Dillon.

He inherited Stanwell upon Elizabeth Bertie's death in 1715, but sold it in 1720 to John Murray, 2nd Earl of Dunmore.

Falkland was sent to England in disguise in July 1722 to sound out English Jacobite leaders in conjunction with the Atterbury Plot. Returning to the Pretender's court in Rome, he was created Earl of Falkland in the Jacobite Peerage as a reward. Around this time, he also seems to have been a patron of James Ogilvie, who prepared the first English translation of Pietro Giannone's Civil History of the Kingdom of Naples. Falkland returned to live at the Jacobite court at Saint-Germain-en-Laye, and married Count Dillon's daughter Laura (1708–1741). They had one daughter:

- Hon. Lucy Cary (c.1728 – 7 February 1804), married Lt-Gen. Charles Edward de Rothe (1710–1766), commander of an Irish regiment in French service

Falkland died in Paris in 1730 and was buried at the Church of Saint-Sulpice. He was succeeded by his eldest son Lucius.

Peerage of England
New creation	— TITULAR — Earl of Falkland; Jacobite peerage 1722–1730	Succeeded by Lucius Cary
Peerage of Scotland
Preceded by Anthony Cary	Viscount Falkland; 1694–1730	Succeeded by Lucius Cary
