= Henry Carey, 1st Earl of Dover =

English peer and Member of Parliament

Henry Carey, 1st Earl of Dover KB (ca. 1580 – 13 April 1666) of Hunsdon, Hertfordshire was an English peer and Member of Parliament.

== Life ==
Carey was the son of John Carey, 3rd Baron Hunsdon. Cambridge University awarded him an honorary MA in 1607. He was knighted, as a Knight of the Bath (KB), on 3 June 1610.

He was elected MP for Sussex in 1609 and Hertfordshire in 1614.

Carey succeeded as 4th Baron Hunsdon on 17 April 1617. On 6 July 1621 he was created Viscount Rochford, a title previously held by his great-great-grandfather Thomas Boleyn, and on 8 March 1628 was created Earl of Dover. He acted as Speaker of the House of Lords in 1641, and was Colonel of the regiment of Oxford Scholars between 1644 and 1646.

In 1638, he sued a London merchant Humphrey Fox for abuse, after Fox had allegedly insulted Dover's livery, worn by a London waterman.

He served as a volunteer in the King's Lifeguard of Horse at the Battle of Edgehill and commanded a part-time garrison regiment known as the 'Regiment of Oxford Scholars' which was raised in April–May 1644 from 'scholars and strangers' at the University.

In 1653 he was indicted for counterfeiting coinage and was obliged to sell his Hunsdon estate to William Willoughby, the future 6th Lord Willoughby of Parham

== Marriages and issue ==
Lord Dover married twice. His first marriage, before 1608, was to Judith Pelham, daughter of Sir Thomas Pelham, 1st Baronet. They had four sons and four daughters:

- John Carey, 2nd Earl of Dover
- Sir Pelham Carey
- Henry Carey (died young)
- George Carey (died young)
- Anne Carey
- Mary Carey (1615–1672). Married Thomas Wharton (died 1684)
- Judith Carey (died 1666) Never married.
- Philadelphia Carey

On 6 July 1630 he was married for a second time, to Mary Morris, daughter of Richard Morris and widow of William Cockayne, at the church of St Peter Le Poer in London.

== Death ==
Henry Carey died in 1666, and was buried at Hunsdon in Hertfordshire. He was succeeded by his son from his first marriage, John Carey, 2nd Earl of Dover.

== Notes ==
Peerage of England
New creation	Earl of Dover; 1628–1666	Succeeded by John Carey
New creation	Viscount Rochford; 1621–1666	Succeeded by John Carey
Preceded by John Carey	Baron Hunsdon (descended by acceleration); 1617–1640	Succeeded by John Carey
