= Lucius Cary, 10th Viscount Falkland =

British Army officer and politician (1803–1884)

The Right Honourable The Viscount Falkland GCH PC
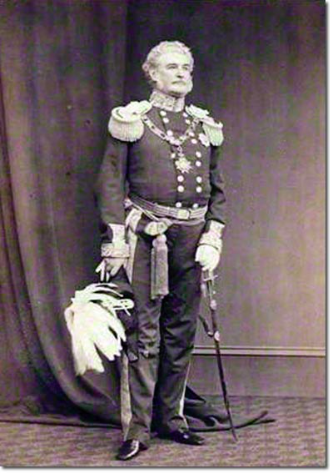

Captain of the Yeomen of the Guard
- In office 24 July 1846 – 11 February 1848
- Preceded by: The Earl of Beverley
- Succeeded by: The Marquess of Donegall

Member of the House of Lords
- Lord Temporal
- In office 3 June 1831 – 10 May 1832 as a Scottish representative peer
- In office 10 May 1832 – 12 March 1884 as a hereditary peer
- Preceded by: Peerage created
- Succeeded by: Peerage extinct

Personal details
- Born: Lucius Bentinck Cary; 5 November 1803
- Died: 12 March 1884 (aged 80)
- Spouse: Lady Amelia FitzClarence (m. 1830; died 1858)
- Children: Lucius Cary, Master of Falkland
- Parent: Charles Cary (father)
- Relatives: Plantagenet Cary (brother); Byron Cary (nephew)

Lucius Bentinck Cary, 10th Viscount Falkland (5 November 1803 – 12 March 1884), styled Master of Falkland until 1809, was a British colonial administrator and Liberal politician.

== Background ==
Falkland was the son of Charles Cary, 9th Viscount Falkland, and his wife, Christiana. He succeeded as tenth Viscount Falkland in 1809 at the age of five after his father was killed in a duel.

He was educated at the Royal Military College, Sandhurst, and on 21 April 1821, purchased an ensigncy in the 22nd Regiment of Foot. He exchanged from the half-pay of that regiment to the 63rd Regiment of Foot on 13 December 1821, and then to the 71st Regiment of Foot on 20 December 1821. Falkland purchased a lieutenancy in the 7th Regiment of Foot on 6 January 1825, and a captaincy on 9 December 1826. He retired from the Army in November 1830.

== Political and administrative career ==
A reformer, Lord Falkland was elected to the House of Lords as a Scottish representative peer in 1831. However, already on 10 May 1832, he was created Baron Hunsdon, of Scutterskelfe in the County of York, in the Peerage of the United Kingdom. This title gave him a seat in the House of Lords. Five years later he was admitted to the Privy Council.

Falkland became Governor of Nova Scotia in 1840 after the recall of Sir Colin Campbell. He opposed the movement led by Joseph Howe for responsible government leading to Howe threatening to horsewhip him. He restructured the colony's Executive Council by including reformers in the body which had previously been a Tory domain but resisted the demand that the majority party in the legislature be permitted to form a government.

Falkland's term ended in 1846. He then returned to England and held office in the Whig government of Lord John Russell as Captain of the Yeomen of the Guard from 1846 to 1848. The latter year he was appointed Governor of Bombay, in which post he remained until 1853. He returned to England the same year and later served as a magistrate in Yorkshire.

== Marriage and family ==
Lord Falkland married Lady Amelia FitzClarence (21 March 1807 – 2 July 1858 London), the last unmarried illegitimate daughter of King William IV and his mistress, Dorothy Jordan, on 27 December 1830 at the Royal Pavilion. The King gave away the bride and the ceremony was performed by the Bishop of Winchester; they spent their honeymoon at Cumberland Lodge. The couple lived at Rudby Hall, North Yorkshire. They had one son, Lucius William Charles Frederick Cary, Master of Falkland (24 November 1831 – 6 August 1871), who married Sarah Christiana Keighly (d. 4 October 1902), but died childless. Lord Falkland died in Montpellier in March 1884, aged 80. As his only son had predeceased him, he was succeeded in his titles (except for the barony of Hunsdon) by his younger brother Admiral Plantagenet Cary.

== Legacy ==
- Namesake of Falkland Ridge, Nova Scotia, Canada

Political offices
Preceded by The Earl of Beverley	Captain of the Yeomen of the Guard; 1846–1848	Succeeded by The Marquess of Donegall
Government offices
Preceded by Sir Colin Campbell	Lieutenant Governor of Nova Scotia; 1840–1846	Succeeded by Sir Jeremiah Dickson (acting)
Preceded by Sir Colin Campbell	Lieutenant Governor of Nova Scotia; 1840–1846	Succeeded by Sir John Harvey
Preceded by Sir George Clerk	Governor of Bombay; 1848–1853	Succeeded by The Lord Elphinstone
Peerage of Scotland
Preceded by Charles Cary	Viscount Falkland; 1809–1884	Succeeded by Plantagenet Cary
Peerage of the United Kingdom
New creation	Baron Hunsdon; 1832–1884; Member of the House of Lords (1832–1884)	Extinct
