= John Carey, 2nd Earl of Dover =

English peer

John Carey, 2nd Earl of Dover (1608 – 26 May 1677), styled Viscount Rochford from 1628 to 1666, was an English peer. He was the eldest son of Henry Carey, 1st Earl of Dover, and Judith, daughter of Sir Thomas Pelham, 1st Baronet. He was educated at St John's College, Cambridge.

== Life ==
He was created a Knight of the Bath in 1626 at the coronation of Charles I. In 1629 he sat in the House of Commons for Hertford. In 1640, through a writ of acceleration, he was summoned to the House of Lords as Baron Hunsdon. At the outbreak of the English Civil War he was among the lords listed as fighting on the parliamentary side at the Battle of Edgehill, when his father fought for the king. Like his general the Earl of Bedford, he was briefly reconciled with the king, becoming a royalist Colonel of Foot. In December 1643 he was listed by the king's councilors as one of the peers 'privy to their counsels at Westminster, or engaged in their party'. In 1644 Parliament considered the evidence of his having received a pardon and taken up arms for the king, leading to Carey being confined and an attempt by the Hertfordshire Sequestration Committee to attempt the seizure of his estate. He continued to sit in the House of Lords and acted as speaker in August 1647, but ceased attending after he was appointed to the committee to consider the charge of treason against the king on 9 January 1649. In 1653 he sold the estate at Hunsdon, which had been made over to him by his father, to William Willoughby.

In 1660 he was present at the first meeting of the House of Lords and was appointed to the committee deciding which peers should be summoned to attend. He succeeded his father as Earl of Dover in 1666. He continued be an active member of the House of Lords until the end of March 1677. He died in May 1677 and was buried in Westminster Abbey. The earldom of Dover and viscountcy of Rochford became extinct on his death; he was succeeded as Baron Hunsdon by a distant cousin. Conisbrough Castle descended to his only daughter.

== Marriages and issue ==
On 9 May 1628, John Carey married Dorothy St. John, daughter of Oliver St John, 1st Earl of Bolingbroke, and Elizabeth Paulet. Dorothy was buried 18 June 1628. There were no children.

He married secondly, on 2 December 1630, Abigail Cokayne (1610–1688), daughter of Sir William Cockayne and Mary Morris. Their only child to survive infancy was Mary (1631–1696), who married William Heveningham, a regicide of Charles I.

Parliament of England
Preceded by Sir Charles Morrison; Sir Thomas Fanshawe	Member of Parliament for Hertford; 1629; With: Sir Thomas Fanshawe	Parliament suspended until 1640
Peerage of England
Preceded by Henry Carey	Earl of Dover; 1666–1677	Extinct
Preceded by Henry Carey	Baron Hunsdon (writ of acceleration); 1640–1677	Succeeded by Robert Carey
