= Earl of Dover =

The title Earl of Dover has been created twice, once in the Peerage of England and once in the Jacobite Peerage.

The creation in the Peerage of England occurred in 1628 when Henry Carey, 1st Viscount Rochford, was created Earl of Dover, in the County of Kent. He was succeeded in 1666 by his son, the second Earl. He had already in 1640 been summoned to the House of Lords through a writ of acceleration in his father's barony of Hunsdon. However, on his death in 1677 the earldom became extinct.

The creation in the Jacobite Peerage occurred in July 1689 when Henry Jermyn, 1st Baron Dover, was created Baron Jermyn of Royston, Baron Ipswich, Viscount Cheveley and Earl of Dover by the deposed King James II, these titles not being recognised by the English Government, though Dover became generally known as the Earl of Dover. He commanded a troop at the Battle of the Boyne, but shortly afterwards made his submission to King William III. He spent the rest of his life living quietly at his London townhouse, or at his country estate Cheveley Park, near Newmarket. He succeeded his brother Thomas as 3rd Baron Jermyn in 1703, and died in 1708. As he left no children by his wife, Judith, daughter of Sir Edmund Poley, of Badley, Suffolk, his titles became extinct at his death.

== Earls of Dover (1628) ==
- Henry Carey, 1st Earl of Dover (1580–1666)
- John Carey, 2nd Earl of Dover (1608–1677)

== Earls of Dover (1689, Jacobite peerage) ==
- Henry Jermyn, 1st Earl of Dover (1636–1708)
