= Lucius Cary, 7th Viscount Falkland =

Scottish peer

- Born: c. 1707
- Died: 27 February 1785 (aged 77–78)
- Spouse(s): Jane Butler (m. 1734; died 1751) Sarah Howard (m. 1752; died 1776)
- Children: 6, including Lucius
- Father: Lucius Cary
- Relatives: Henry Cary (grandson)

Lucius Charles Cary, 7th Viscount Falkland (c. 1707 – 27 February 1785) was a Scottish peer.

== Biography ==
Cary was the son of Lucius Cary, 6th Viscount Falkland and his first wife, Dorothy. He succeeded to the peerage in 1730 when his father, a loyal Jacobite (and an earl in the Jacobite peerage) died in Paris.

On 6 April 1734, Falkland married Jane, Viscountess Villiers (d. December 1751), the daughter of Richard Butler and widow of his first cousin, James, Viscount Villiers. They had one son and five daughters:

- Lucius Cary, Master of Falkland (1735–1780)
- Hon. Jane Cary (1736–1808)
- Hon. Mary Elizabeth Cary (1738 – 1 October 1783), married Rev. John Law (d. 1827)
- Hon. Frances Dorothy Cary (d. 1761), married William Plumer on 12 July 1760
- Hon. Mary Cary
- Hon. Charlotte Cary, married Anthony Chapman

On 10 October 1752, Falkland married Sarah, Countess of Suffolk (d. 27 May 1776), the daughter of Thomas Inwen and widow of Henry Howard, 10th Earl of Suffolk. They had no children.

Falkland's only son predeceased him in 1780, so when he died in 1785, he was succeeded by his grandson Henry Cary, 8th Viscount Falkland.

Peerage of Scotland
Preceded by Lucius Cary	Viscount Falkland; 1730–1785	Succeeded by Henry Cary
