= Boddam =

Boddam may refer to:

== People ==
- Charles Boddam (1762–1811), East India Company writer and judge
- Edmond Boddam (1879–1959), Australian cricketer
- Rawson Hart Boddam (1734–1812), Governor of the Bombay Presidency under the East India Company, father of Charles Boddam

== Places ==
- Boddam, Aberdeenshire, Scotland, a village
- Boddam, Shetland, Scotland, a village
- Île Boddam, an islet in the Salomon Islands, British Indian Ocean Territory

== Other uses ==
- Boddam (1787 EIC ship), a ship of the British East India Company launched in 1787
- Boddam railway station, Boddam, Aberdeenshire, Scotland
