= William Medows =

British Army officer (1738–1813)

General Sir William Medows KB
- Portrait by Robert Home, c. 1790–1792
- Born: 31 December 1738
- Died: 14 November 1813 (aged 74); Bath, Somerset
- Military career
- Allegiance: Great Britain; United Kingdom
- Branch: British Army
- Service years: 1756–1813
- Rank: General
- Units: 50th Regiment of Foot; 5th Regiment of Foot; 12th Light Dragoons; 55th Regiment of Foot; 89th Regiment of Foot
- Commands: Commander-in-Chief of Ireland; Commander-in-Chief of the Bombay Army
- Conflicts: Seven Years' War; American Revolutionary War; Battle of Brandywine; Battle of Monmouth; Battle of St. Lucia; Battle of Porto Praya; Third Anglo-Mysore War; Siege of Coimbatore; Siege of Seringapatam
- Awards: KB
- Other work: Governor of Bombay

General Sir William Medows KB (31 December 1738 – 14 November 1813) was a British Army officer. He entered the army in 1756 and saw action in North America, the Cape, and India. In 1788 he was appointed Governor of Bombay, transferring to become Governor of Madras in 1790. That year, at the head of 15,000 men, he attacked Tipu Sultan of Mysore. In a see-saw campaign was slightly wounded, mishandled a crucial assault and attempted suicide before the war ended in Britain's favour. In 1801 was appointed Commander-in-Chief, Ireland as a full general.

== Military career ==
Sir William was the son of Philip Medows, deputy ranger of Richmond Park, and Lady Frances Pierrepont, daughter of William Pierrepont, Earl of Kingston who married in 1734.

Following on from his years at Eton (1755–56), entered the British Army as an ensign in the 50th Regiment of Foot in 1756. In 1760 he went with his regiment to join the allied army under Prince Ferdinand of Brunswick, who as Frederick the Great's lieutenant was defending western Germany against the French. Medows remained in Germany till March 1764. In 1769 obtained the lieutenant-colonelcy of the 5th Regiment of Foot, exchanging in September 1773 into the 12th Light Dragoons.

=== Marriage ===
In 1770, Medows had a "romantic" friendship with his second cousin, Lady Louisa Stuart, then aged thirteen, a daughter of John Stuart, 3rd Earl of Bute. Medows was then thirty-two, and Lord Bute considered him unsuitable and put a stop to it. Lady Louisa was bitterly disappointed, and never married. Later the same year, Medows married another lady, Frances Augusta Hammerton.

=== North America, the Cape, and India ===
In September 1775 Medows exchanged into the 55th Regiment of Foot, which was due to be sent to the Thirteen Colonies to fight in the American Revolutionary War. On 14 May 1776, he was detached from the 55th to command the 1st Battalion of Grenadiers, a temporary formation created by combining the Grenadier companies of half the regiments in General Howe's army. He distinguished himself at the Battle of Brandywine in September 1777, where he was severely wounded commanding his Grenadiers. In November of 1777, following the death of Lt-Col William Walcott of wounds he received at the Battle of Germantown, Medows exchanged back into the 5th Regiment in place of the deceased Walcott. He remained in command of the 1st Grenadier Battalion, however, and led them in action once again at the Battle of Monmouth in June 1778. In October of 1778, in preparation for the British invasion of the West Indies, Medows relinquished command of his Grenadiers. Medows, now holding the local rank of Brigadier General, commanded the Advance Corps of General James Grant's army during the Battle of St. Lucia in December of 1778, once again highly distinguishing himself.

He returned to Great Britain in 1780, and was now made colonel of the 89th Regiment. Medows held a high command in the expedition sent out under Commodore Johnstone against the Cape of Good Hope in 1781. A skirmish occurred with the French admiral, Suffren, (also bound for the Cape) at Porto Praya in the Cape Verde Islands on 16 April 1781, and on arriving at the Cape of Good Hope the British found that Suffren had anticipated them and landed such strong reinforcements that an attack would be useless. Johnstone now decided to return to Europe. Medows, however, having heard that the British in the south of India were being hard pressed by Haider Ali, sultan of Mysore, sailed with three of the ships and a large body of troops to Madras (now Chennai), where he arrived on 13 February 1782. He accompanied Colonel William Fullarton in an expedition from Madras against Mysore, but the sudden conclusion of peace soon put a stop to the campaign.

=== Governor of Bombay ===
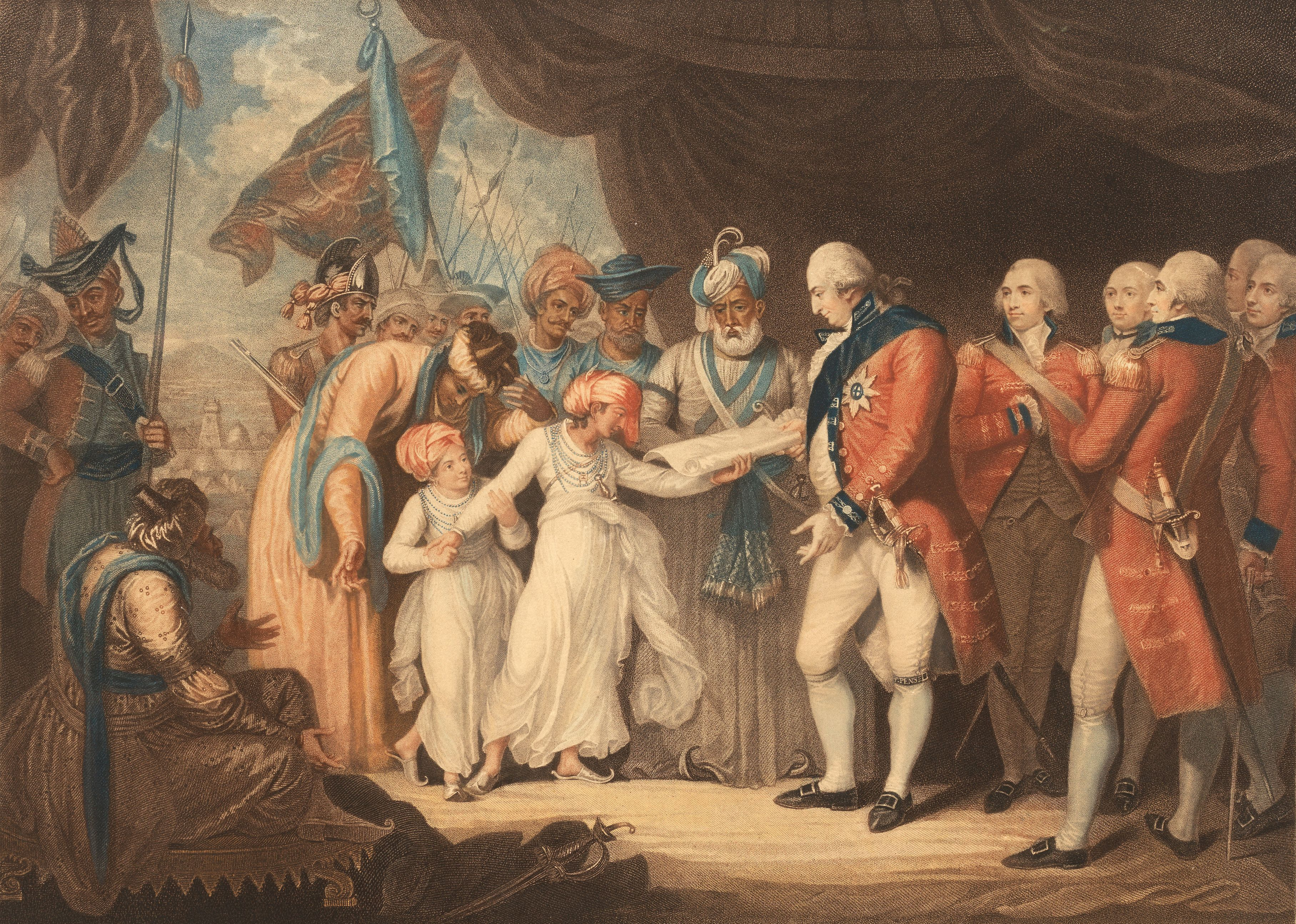
Lord Cornwallis receiving Tipu Sultan's sons as hostages on 26 February 1792 at the end of the Third Anglo-Mysore War

In September 1788 Medows received the posts of Governor of Bombay and commander-in-chief of the Bombay Army. He remained there until January 1790, when he was transferred to become Governor of Madras and commander-in-chief of the Madras Army. A war with Tipu Sultan, Hyder Ali's son and successor as sultan of Mysore, had arisen, and Lord Cornwallis, the governor-general, now instructed Medows to open the campaign. Starting from Trichinopoli at the head of 15,000 men on 15 June 1790, Medows crossed the frontier into Mysore, and advanced in a westerly direction. On 22 July the army arrived at Coimbatore, which was found evacuated by the enemy. While he was able to secure the district, he spread his forces too thinly, and Tipu counterattacked against the smaller detachments, and Medows was forced to withdraw his forces to a few strong points in late 1790.

Lord Cornwallis then announced his intention of undertaking sole command of the British army. Medows served under Cornwallis through the campaigns of 1791 to 1792, and commanded the right column in the night attack on the Seringapatam redoubts on 6 February 1792. His attack was misplaced; in the dark of night he ended up capturing a different fortification than the one intended; in doing so, he dangerously exposed the British flank. Tipu attacked the weak point, and very nearly recovered his position, slightly wounding Cornwallis in the process. Tipu eventually sued for peace, and the fighting ended on 25 February while terms were negotiated. The next day, Medows attempted suicide, inflicting three bullet wounds on himself. While the reason for this is unknown, Cornwallis never blamed Medows for his actions on 26 February.

Peace was eventually agreed, with Tipu agreeing to the Treaty of Seringapatam on 18 March. Medows resigned the prize-money (nearly £5,000) which fell to his share and distributed it among the troops. He left for Great Britain in August 1792.

=== Later career ===
On 14 December of that year he was made a Knight of the Bath, on 12 October 1793 he was made a lieutenant-general, and in November 1796 he was appointed to the command of the 7th Dragoon Guards. At the brevet promotion of 1 January 1798 he was made a general and received the post of Lieutenant-Governor of the Isle of Wight. In 1801 he succeeded Cornwallis for a short space as Commander-in-Chief, Ireland.

He died at Bath on 14 November 1813, aged 74.

Government offices
Preceded by Andrew Ramsay	Governor of Bombay; 1788–1790	Succeeded by Robert Abercromby
Military offices
Preceded by Lawrence Nilson	C-in-C, Bombay Army (While serving as Governor); 1788–1790	Succeeded by Robert Abercromby
Government offices
Preceded by Archibald Campbell	Governor of Madras; 1790–1792	Succeeded by Baron Hobart
Military offices
Preceded by Mathew Horne and John Floyd	C-in-C, Madras Army (While serving as Governor); 1790–1792	Succeeded by John Braithwaite
Preceded by The Marquess Cornwallis	Commander-in-Chief, Ireland; 1801–1803	Succeeded by Henry Fox
Preceded by The Earl of Clanricarde	Governor of Kingston-upon-Hull; 1808–1813	Succeeded by The Duke of Richmond
Preceded by Hon. Lucius Cary	Colonel of the 89th Regiment of Foot; 1780–1783	Regiment disbanded
Preceded by Sir George Osborn, Bt	Colonel of the 73rd (Highland) Regiment of Foot; 1786–1796	Succeeded by Gerard Lake
Preceded by Sir Ralph Abercromby	Colonel of the 7th (The Princess Royal's) Dragoon Guards; 1796–1813	Succeeded by Richard Wilford
