= Bacchantes (Kauffman) =

Painting by Angelica Kaufmann

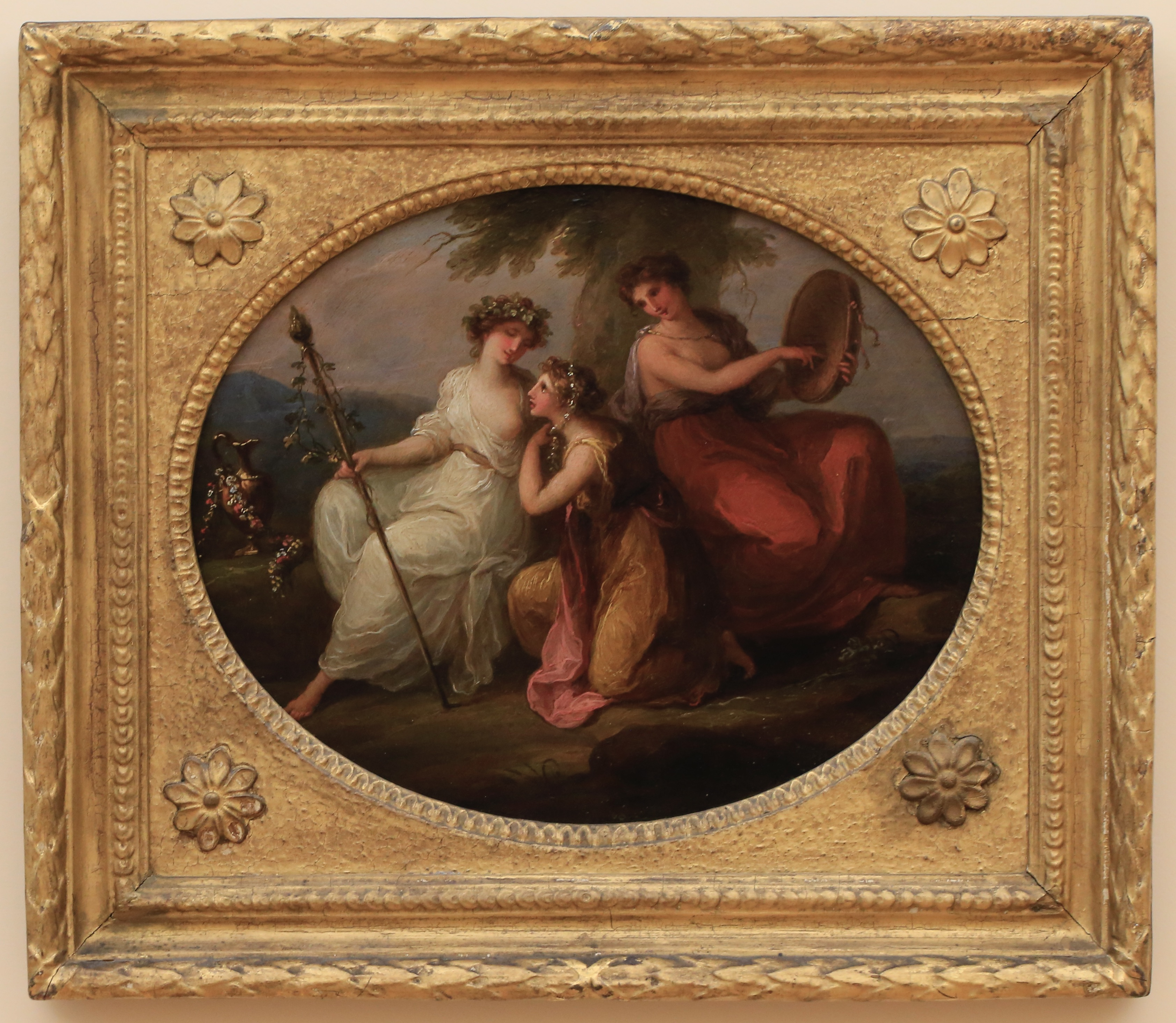
The Bacchantines (c. 1786) by Angelica Kauffman

The Bacchantines (German: Die Bacchantinnen) is a painting by neoclassical artist Angelica Kauffman, painted no later than 1786.

== Description ==
The painting depicts a cheerful company of three bacchantes (the companions of the ancient Greek god of wine Dionysus) dressed in airy togas. They sit on a ledge under a tree trunk. The girl on the left has characteristic attributes of a Bacchante: she wears a wreath of grape leaves on her head and holds a staff-thyrsus in her right hand. A jug covered with a garland of flowers stands aside from her. A Bacchante sitting on the right is beating a tympanum. Between them, down on one knee, is a third girl, her hair decorated with a garland of flowers, and in front of her (according to the engraving) on the ground is a musical triangle. Because of these attributes, she can be interpreted as the grace of joy and beauty Euphrosyne. In 1786, the artist Francesco Bartolozzi made a spot engraving from the painting. One of these copies in painted form is kept in the Hermitage Museum. Later this painting, as well as other works by Kaufmann, became widespread in porcelain decoration.

== Provenance ==
The painting was probably commissioned by the English official Charles Boddam (1762–1811). On December 15, 1922, the painting was probably exhibited at Christie, Manson & Woods auction in London. On June 17, 1991, it was sold at a Christie's auction in Zurich by Dr. Johannes Fulda. In 2021, he donated his collection to the Bündner Kunstmuseum, in Chur.

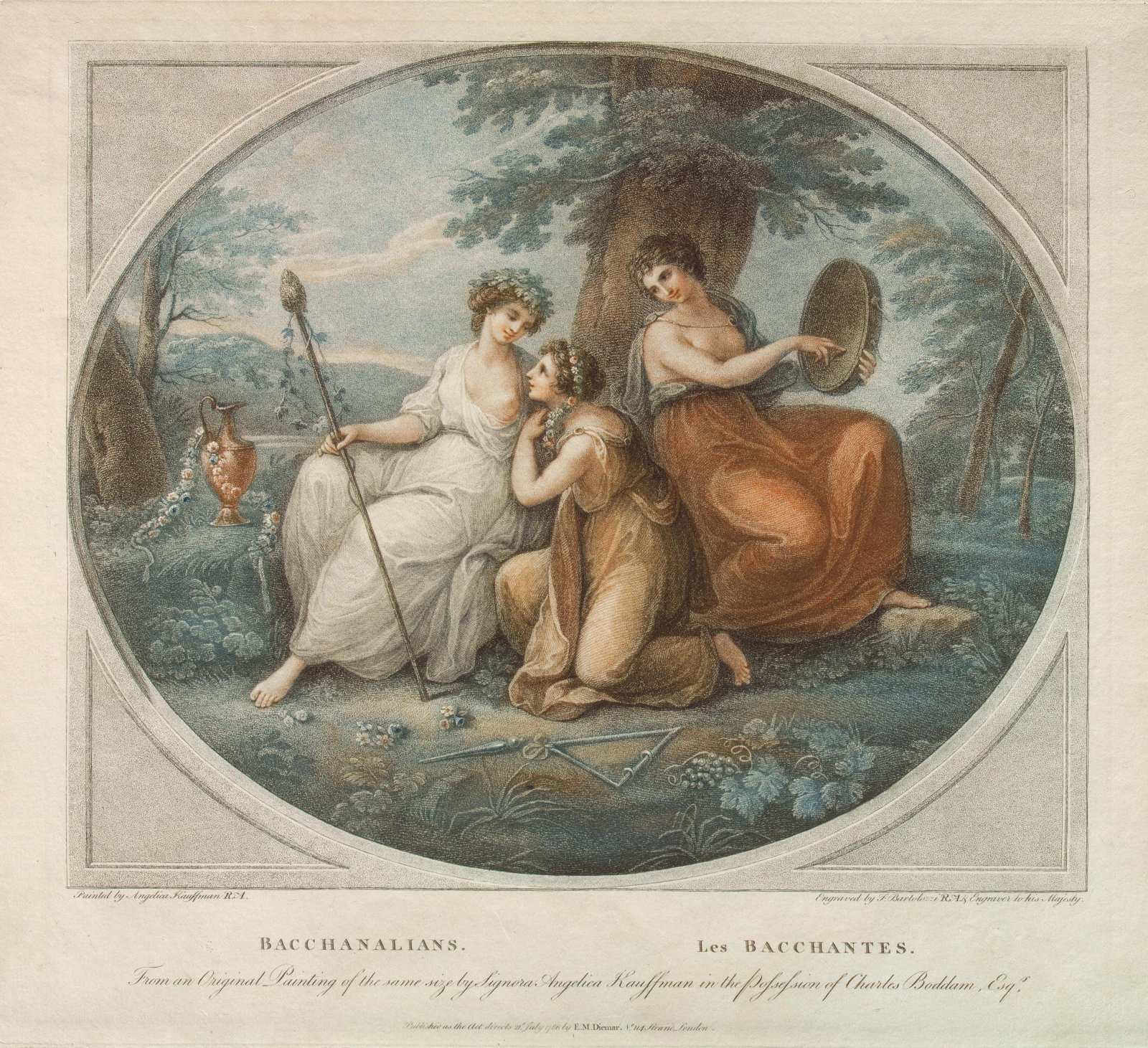
The Bacchantines (1786) Francesco Bartolozzi after Angelica Kauffman. Hermitage Museum

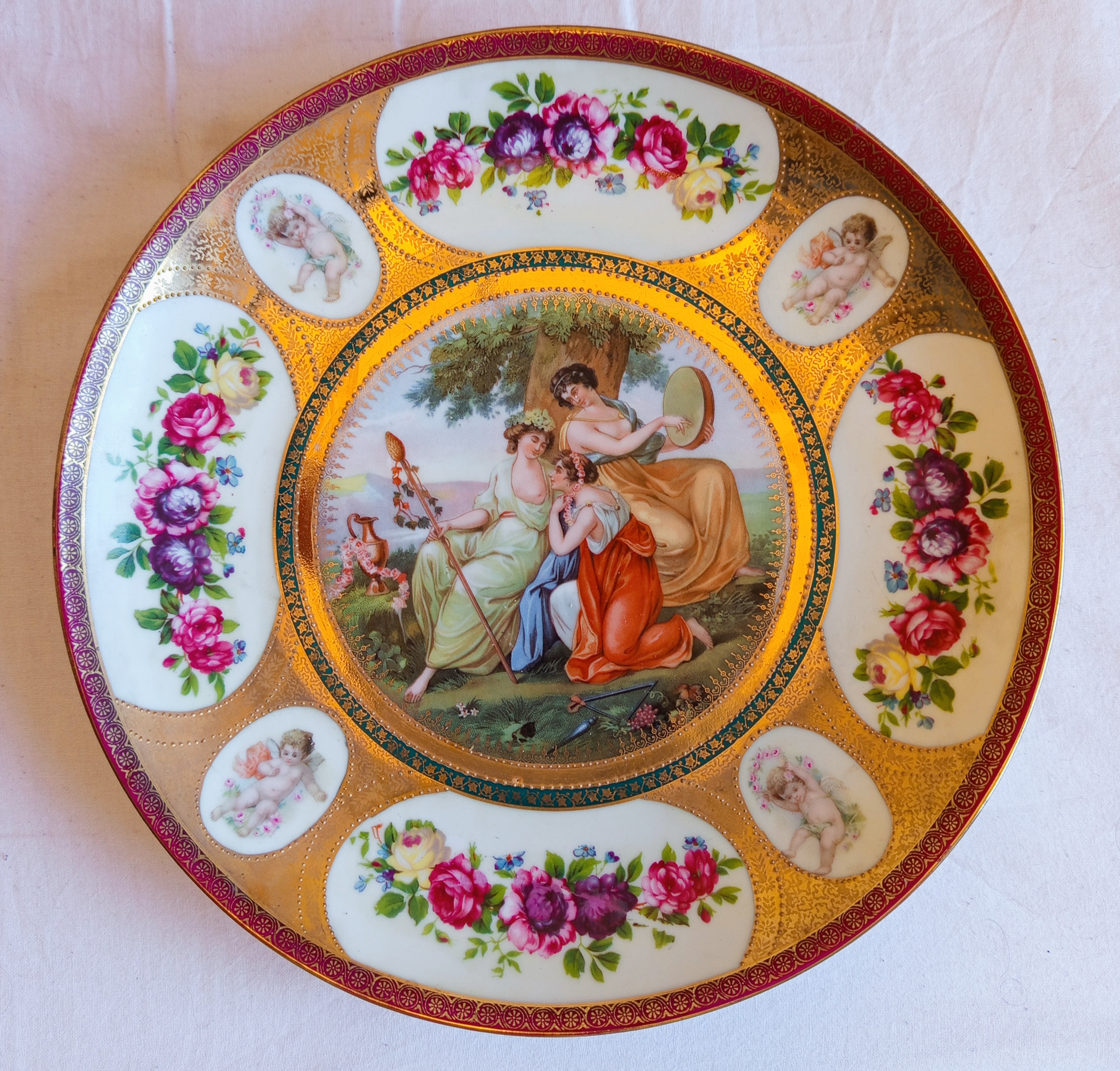
Plate with decal. Erdmann Schlegelmilch

== See also ==
- List of paintings by Angelica Kauffman
