= Robert Bowles =

Robert Bowles may refer to:

- Robert Bowles (East India Company officer) (1744–1812), Major general in Bombay Army
- Robert Bowles (karate), American karate teacher, founder of the International Shuri-ryū Association
