= William Joseph Eastwick =

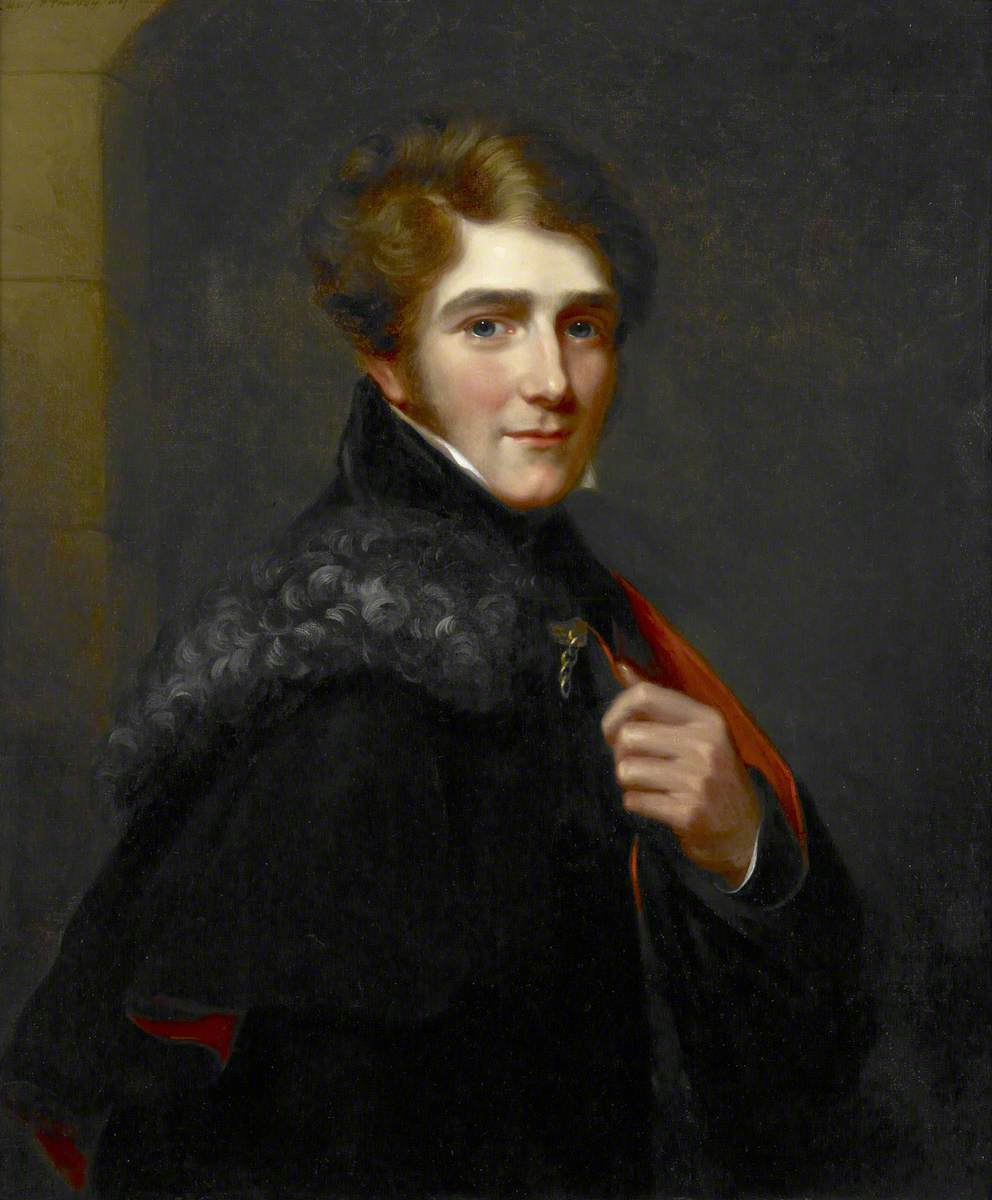
Portrait of Captain William Joseph Eastwick, by Mary Martha Pearson

Captain William Joseph Eastwick (1808 – 24 February 1889) was a British military officer and director of the East India Company.

The eldest son of Captain Robert William Eastwick of the Bombay Marine, he was educated at Winchester College, where he was a contemporary of Lord Selborne and Lord Sherbrooke. A younger brother was the Orientalist and politician Edward Backhouse Eastwick.

Eastwick went out to India in 1826 as an ensign in the Bombay Army. He serve in the force of General James Welsh at Kolapore, as well as in southern Mahratta. After passing his examination in Persian with distinction, he was appointed to the Political Department. His first assignment was as an assistant to Sir Henry Pottinger in Sind. In 1839, he was in charge of negotiations with the Amirs of Hyderabad, which opened the Indus to British trade.

During the First Anglo-Afghan War, he was put in charge of the districts east of the Bolan Pass and officiated as Resident of Hyderabad. During the winter of 1841–42, he collected supplies and transport for the army sent to reinforce General William Nott at Kandahar, for which he received the thanks of the government.

Eastwick returned to England in 1841 and did not return to India. In 1846 or 1847, he was elected to the Court of Directors of the East India Company, eventually becoming its last deputy chairman. When India was brought under the British crown in 1858, Eastwick was one of the directors selected to fill seats on the Council of India, where he remained until retiring in 1868.
