= Samuel Birch (Egyptologist) =

British Egyptologist and antiquarian (1813–1895)

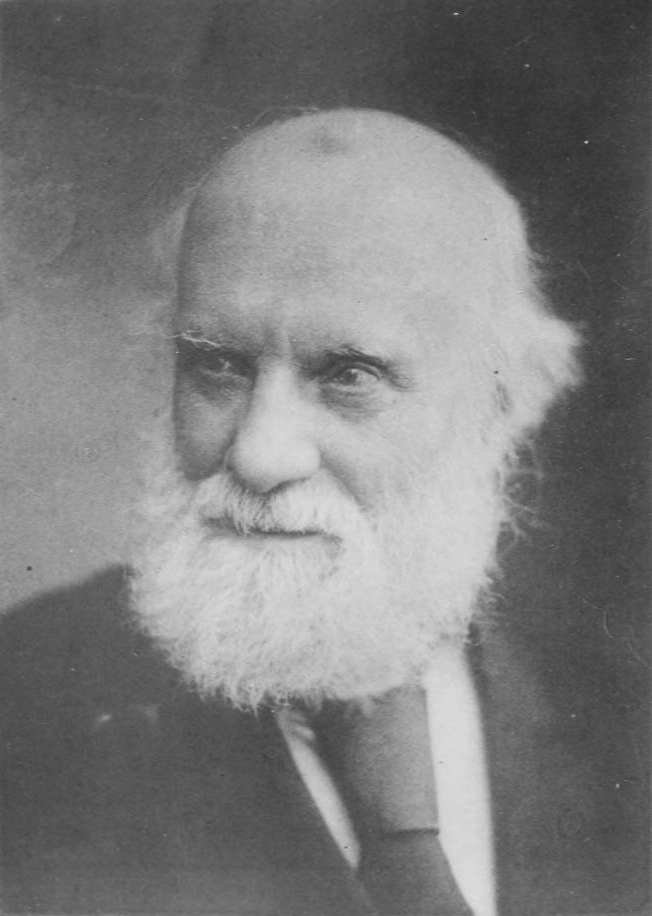
- Born: 3 November 1813; St Mary Woolnoth, London, England, United Kingdom
- Died: 27 December 1885 (aged 72)
- Occupation: Egyptologist
- Employer: British Museum
- Relatives: Samuel Birch (grandfather)

Samuel Birch (3 November 1813 – 27 December 1885) was a British Egyptologist and antiquarian.

== Biography ==
Birch was the son of a rector at St Mary Woolnoth, London. He was educated at Merchant Taylors' School. From an early age, his manifest tendency to the study of out-of-the-way subjects well suited his later interest in archaeology. After brief employment in the Record Office, in 1836 he got a job working at the antiquities department of the British Museum. He was 23 years old at the time, and was employed because he could read Chinese, which was unusual at that time.He soon broadened his research to Egyptian. When the cumbrous department came to be divided, he was appointed to head the Egyptian and Assyrian branch.

In the latter language he had assistance, but for many years there was only one other person in the institution, in a different department, who knew anything of ancient Egyptian. The entire arrangement of the department devolved upon Birch. He found time nevertheless for Egyptological work of the highest value, including a hieroglyphical grammar and dictionary, translations of The Book of the Dead and papyrus Harris I, and numerous catalogues and guides.

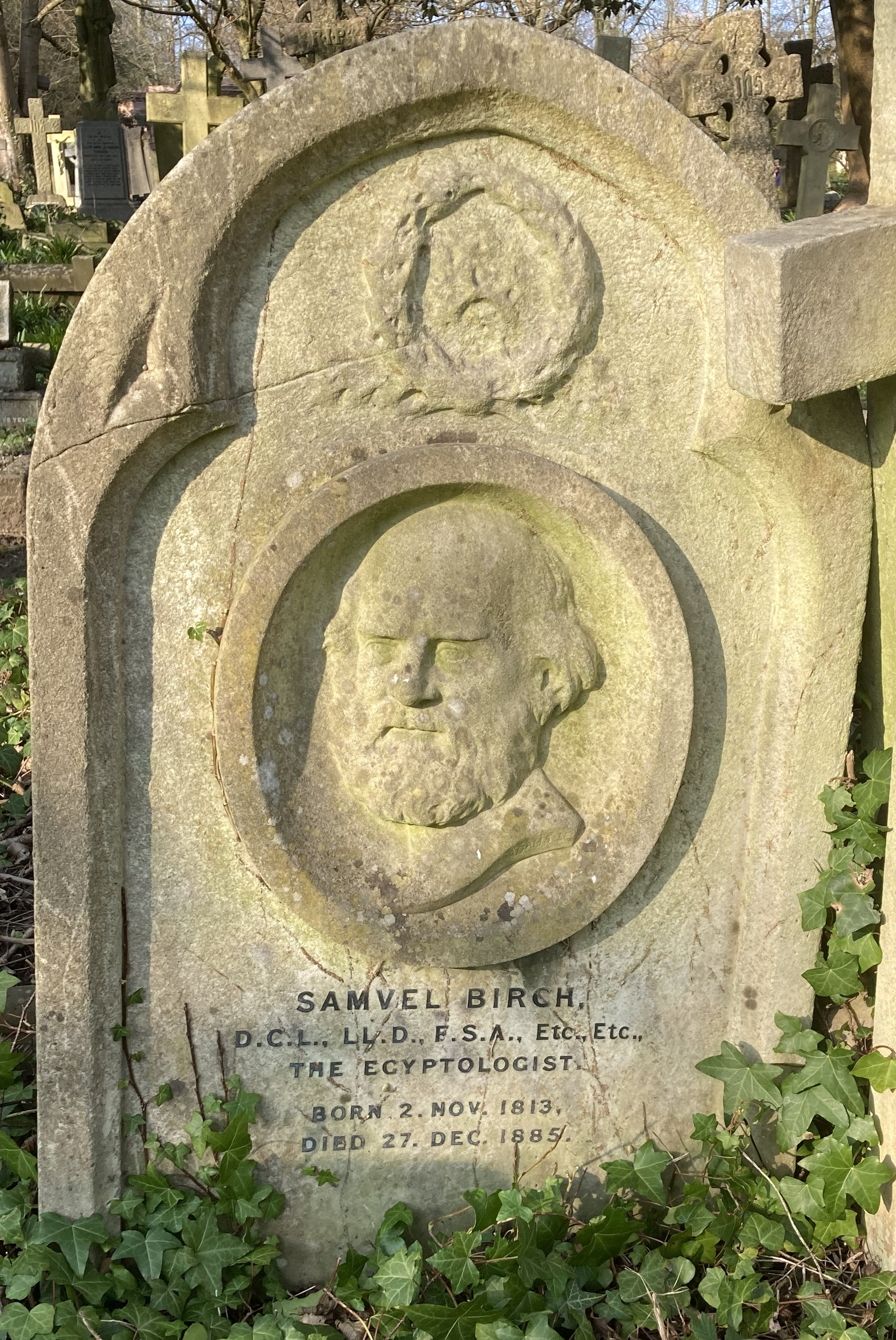
Grave of Samuel Birch in Highgate Cemetery (east side)

He further wrote what was long a standard history of pottery, investigated the Cypriote syllabary, and proved by various publications that he had not lost his old interest in Chinese. Paradoxical in many of his views on things in general, he was sound and cautious as a philologist; while learned and laborious, he possessed much of the instinctive divination of genius.

His grandfather, also named Samuel Birch, was a renowned dramatist and Lord Mayor of London (1814).

He was elected as a member of the American Philosophical Society in 1869.

He died on 27 December 1885 and is buried in Highgate Cemetery. The headstone on his grave was sculpted by George Gammon Adams.

== Publications ==
- Sketch of a Hieroglyphical Dictionary, 1838.
- Analecta Sinensia, 1841.
- Select Papyri in the Hieratic Character, 3 pts. fol. 1841–4.
- Tablets from the Collection of the Earl of Belmore, 1843.
- Friends till Death (from Chinese), 1845.
- An Introduction to the Study of the Egyptian Hieroglyphics, 1857.
- History of Ancient Pottery, 2 vols. 1858. John Murray, London. Vol. I
- Memoire sur une Patere, 1858.
- Select Papyri, pt, ii. 18 (50).
- A Description of the Collection of Ancient Marbles in the British Museum Part 11. 1861.
- ChineseWidow (from Chinese), 1862. (From ch'in ku ch'i kuan)
- Elfin Foxes (from Chinese), 1863.
- Papyrus of Nas-Khem, 1863.
- Facsimiles of Egyptian Relics, 1863.
- Facsimiles of two Papyri, 1863.
- Inscriptions in the Himyaritic Character, 1863.
- Egypt's Place in Universal History, 1867. (Vol. 5 - contributed the first extensive English translation of the Book of the Dead); original written in German by Christian Charles Josias von Bunsen, translated by Charles Herbert Cottrell — Samuel Birch made additions to the 5th volume translated by Cottrell; 2021 reprint of 1867 original
  - Ägyptens Stelle in der Weltgeschichte, 5 volumes, 1844–57.
  - Vol. 1, 1845 vol. 1, pp. 0-173, vol. 1, pp. 174-371, vol. 1, pp. 372-583, vol. 1, pp. 584-end
  - Vol. 2, 1844 vol. 2, pp. 0-229, vol. 2, pp. 230-panel
  - Vol. 3, 1845 vol. 3, together with vol. 4.
  - Vol. 4, Catalogue vol. 4, Catalogue
  - Vol. 5, in two parts, 1857 vol. 5.1, pp. 0-299, vol. 5.1, pp. 300-end, vol. 5.2, pp. 0-281, vol. 5.2, pp. 282-529, vol. 5.2, pp. 530-end
- The Casket of Gems (from Chinese), 1872. (From ch'in ku ch'i kuan)
- History of Egypt, 1875.
- Facsimile of Papyrus of Rameses III, fol. 1876.
- The Monumental History of Egypt: Rede Lecture, 1876. (See Rede Lecture.)
- Egyptian Texts, 1877.
- Ancient History from the Monuments: Egypt from Earliest Times to B.C. 300 1879.
- Catalogue of Egyptian Antiquities at Alnwick Castle, 1880.
- The Coffin of Amamu (unfinished).

== General and cited references ==
- Lee, Sidney, ed. (1901). "Birch, Samuel (1813-1885)" . Dictionary of National Biography (1st supplement). London: Smith, Elder & Co.
- Chisholm, Hugh, ed. (1911). "Birch, Samuel" . Encyclopædia Britannica (11th ed.). Cambridge University Press.
