= Governor Ramsay =

Governor Ramsay may refer to:

- Andrew Ramsay (governor), Governor of Bombay in 1788
- Simon Ramsay, 16th Earl of Dalhousie (1914–1999), Governor-General of the Federation of Rhodesia and Nyasaland from 1957 to 1963
- George Ramsay, 9th Earl of Dalhousie (1770–1838), Governor of Nova Scotia from 1816 to 1820 and Governor General of British North America from 1820 to 1828
