= Mary Martha Pearson =

English portrait painter (1798–1871)

- née Dutton
- Born: 18 June 1798; Birchin Lane, London
- Died: 15 April 1871 (aged 72); Brighton
- Resting place: West Norwood Cemetery

Mary Martha Pearson (née Dutton; 1798–1871) was an English portrait painter.

== Life ==
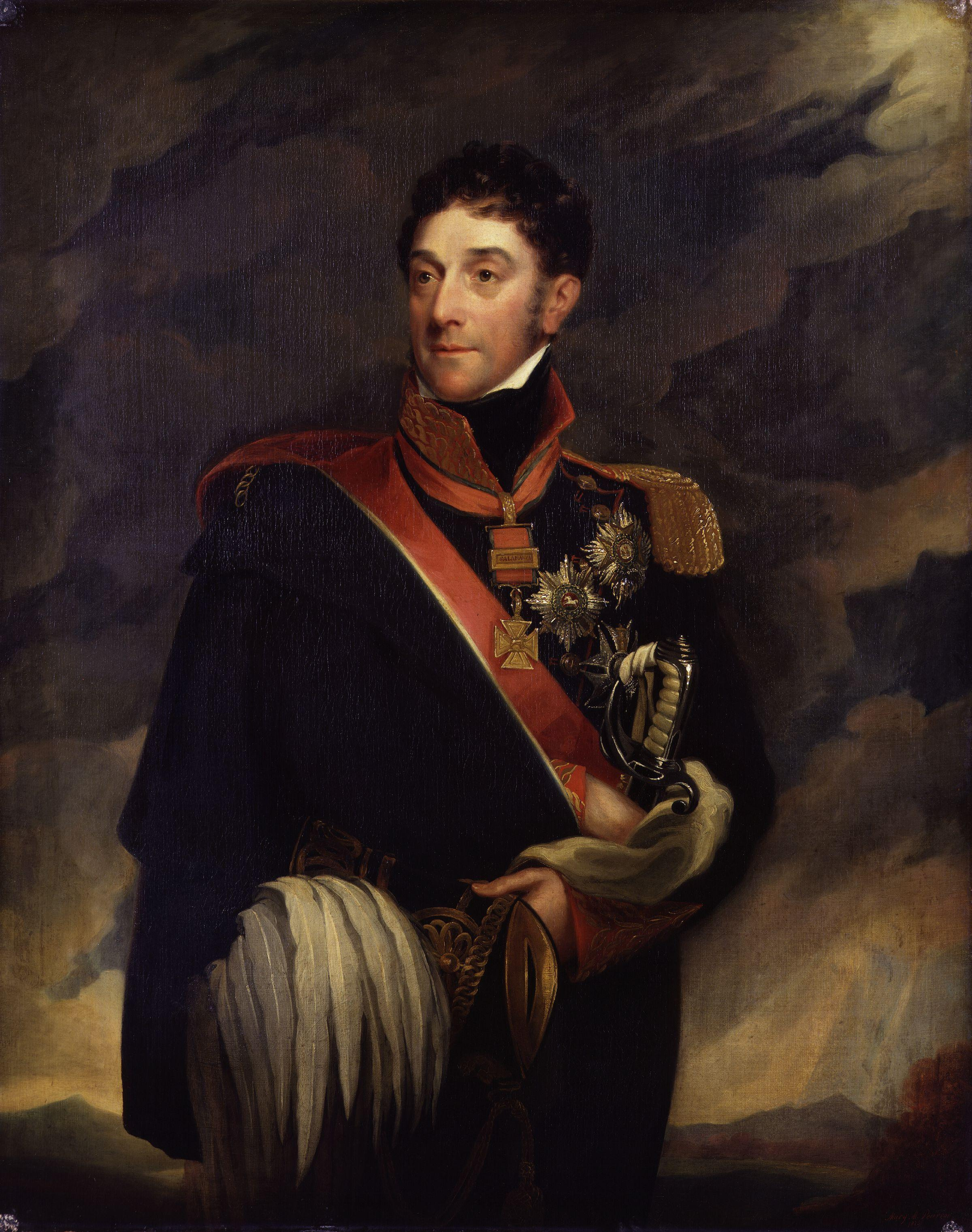
Stapleton Cotton, 1st Viscount Combermere by Mary Martha Pearson

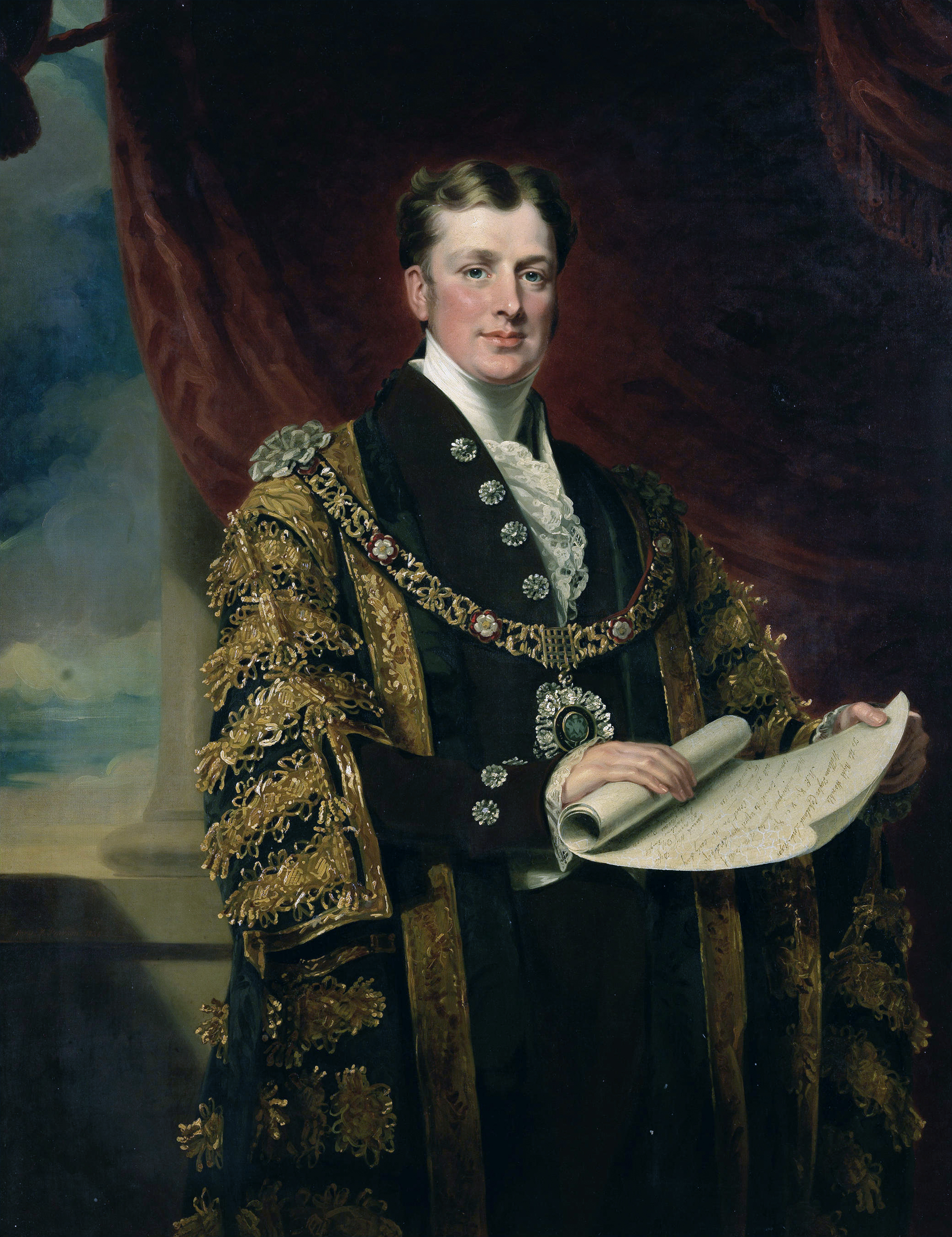
William Taylor Copeland, MP, Lord Mayor of London by Mary Martha Pearson

She was born on 18 June 1798 in Birchin Lane in the City of London, daughter of Robert Dutton, a bookseller who also ran a circulating library in Gracechurch Street, and his wife Martha, daughter of John Comberbach of Haughton Hall. She had lessons with a drawing-master called Lewis. From 1813 she made copies from the old masters in the gallery of the British Institution in Pall Mall, and in 1815 was awarded a gold medal by the Institution for her copy of Claude's The Embarkation of the Queen of Sheba. This copy, and one of Titian's Daughter, were then hung alongside the originals.

In 1817 she married Charles Pearson, who later became the solicitor to the City of London and a member of parliament. Following her marriage, she continued her study of the old masters, as well as painting portraits and some landscapes. She won silver medals for views of the Rhine, and of Bodiam Castle.

She exhibited 31 works, almost all portraits, at the Royal Academy between 1821 and 1842. She was an early member of the Society of British Artists, and exhibited 37 works at their gallery in Suffolk Street. Reviewing her portrait of Lady Mostyn, shown there in 1834, the critic of Arnold's Magazine of the Fine Arts said

The portraits by Mrs. Pearson have ever an air of identity about them, and in the opinion of many, this, after all, in portraiture, is the only quality that the artist needs to be so very solicitous to produce. The head of Lady Mostyn, however, is worthy of higher note.

When her husband developed a site in Westminster, on the south side of St James's Park, the block of buildings constructed included both offices for himself, and a studio and gallery for his wife.

She painted numerous portraits of leading figures in the Corporation of London, including several Lord Mayors. The Times, reviewing her painting of one of them, William Taylor Copeland, shown at the Royal Academy in 1836, said that, in the light of her civic portraits, "the least the Corporation of London could do, would be to present the fair delineator of their well-fed countenances with the freedom of the city, emblazoned on a rosewood palette".

She did not show work at any of the major London exhibitions after 1842. In 1844 she presented a portrait of Lord Chief Justice Denman to the Corporation of London. According to a report in The Athenæum Journal, at the time, her accompanying letter announced it as "the last picture of that magnitude which it is her intention to undertake."

Her sister, a miniature painter (named in the catalogues simply as "Miss Dutton") showed portraits of her at the Royal Academy in 1834 and 1852.

She had a daughter, Mary Dutton Pearson. She died on 15 April 1871, aged 72, at Brighton, and was buried with her husband in a large sarcophagus tomb at West Norwood Cemetery.

== Subjects ==
Her portrait subjects included:

- Miss Smithson of Drury Lane Theatre in the character of Ellen in the Falls of the Clyde (exhibited at the Royal Academy in 1823).
- Stapleton Cotton, 1st Viscount Combermere (1825; National Portrait Gallery)
- Chapman Marshall (exhibited at the Royal Academy in 1825).
- Captain William Joseph Eastwick (1827: British Library India Office Collection)
- Mrs S.C. Hall (Anna Maria Hall) (exhibited at the Royal Academy in 1830).
- Sir John Key, the Lord Mayor (exhibited at the Royal Academy in 1831).
- Lord Denman (1779–1854), Baron of Dovedale (c.1832; City of London Corporation).
- J. Humphrey, M.P., Sheriff of London and Middlesex (exhibited at the Royal Academy in 1832).
- Sir James Shaw, Chamberlain of the City of London, "as he appeared in the act of presenting the freedom of the city, in a gold box, to the Earl Grey, in the Court of Common Council". (exhibited at the Royal Academy in 1834; Corporation of London).
- Henry Winchester, the Lord Mayor (exhibited at the Royal Academy in 1835).
- William Taylor Copeland, the Lord Mayor. (exhibited at the Royal Academy in 1836).
- Thomas Kelly, Lord Mayor. (exhibited at the Royal Academy in 1837).
- Sir John Pirie, Lord Mayor (exhibited at the Royal Academy in 1842).
- Samuel Birch, Lord Mayor of London (1832; City of London Corporation).
- Thomas Wright Hill (Birmingham City Art Gallery); portraits of his son Sir Rowland Hill and daughter-in-law, Lady Caroline Hill (both c.1836) belonging to the British Postal Museum and Archive are attributed to Pearson.
- Mrs Otho Manners (Brighton Pavilion).
- Sir David Salomons (shown at the Society of British Artists).

Charles Turner made mezzotints after her portraits of Sir John Key, Edward Pryce Baron Mostyn, Richard Grimshaw Lomax and David Salomons.
