= Samuel Birch (Lord Mayor of London) =

Lord Mayor of London

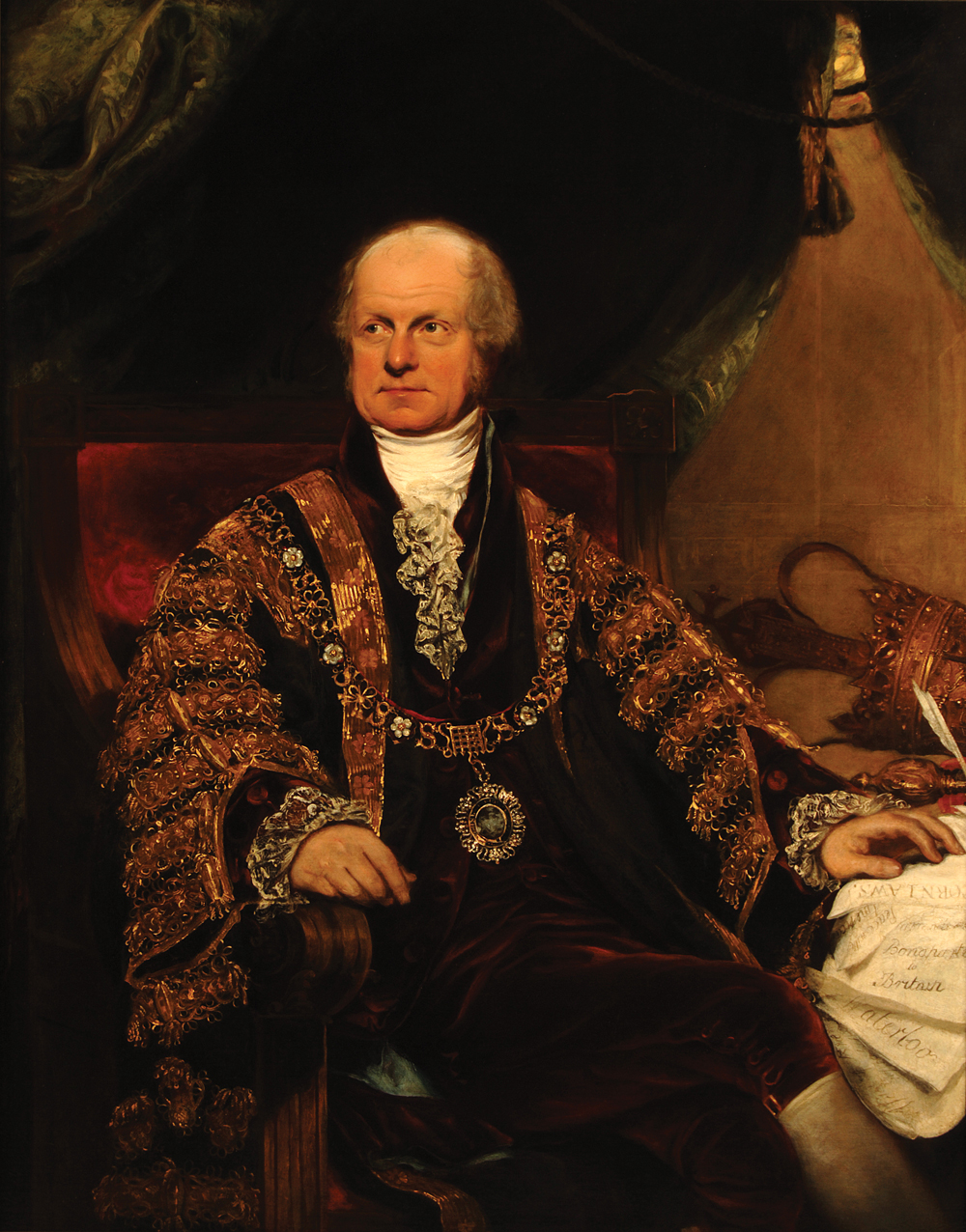
Portair of Samuel Birch by Mary Martha Pearson.

Samuel Birch (1757–1841) was Lord Mayor of London, England. Birch began his career as a pastrycook, and was known also as a dramatist.

== Life ==
He was the son of Lucas Birch, who carried on the business of a pastrycook and confectioner at 16 Cornhill. This shop, though the upper portion of the house had been rebuilt, still (1885) retains its old-fashioned front, and is probably the oldest shop of the kind in the city. The business was established in the reign of George I by a Mr. Horton, the immediate predecessor of Lucas Birch. Samuel was educated at a private school kept by Mr. Crawford at Newington Butts, and upon leaving school was apprenticed to his father.

Early in life, in 1778, he married the daughter of Dr. John Fordyce, by whom he had a family of thirteen children. He was elected one of the common council on 21 December 1781, and in 1789 became deputy of the Cornhill ward.

In May 1807, he was elected alderman of the Candlewick ward in the place of Alderman Hankey. When young he devoted much of his leisure time to the cultivation of his mental powers and the improvement of his literary taste; he was a frequent attendant of a debating society which met in one of the large rooms formerly belonging to the King's Arms Tavern, Cornhill, and there, in the winter of 1778, he made his first essay in public speaking. In politics he was a strenuous supporter of Pitt's administration, though he vigorously opposed the repeal of the Test and Corporation Acts. He became a frequent speaker at the common council meetings. When he first proposed the formation of volunteer regiments at the outbreak of the French revolution, not a single common councilman supported him. Subsequently, when the measure was adopted, he became the lieutenant-colonel commandant of the 1st regiment of Loyal London volunteers.

The speech which he delivered in the Guildhall on 5 March 1805 against the Roman Catholic petition was severely criticised in an article entitled 'Deputy Birch and others on the Catholic Claims, which appeared in the Edinburgh Review (x. 124-36). It was, however, highly commended by the king, and the freedom of the city of Dublin was twice voted him at the midsummer quarter assembly of the corporation of that city on 19 July 1805 and 18 July 1806, for his advocacy of the Protestant ascendency in Ireland.

In 1811, he was appointed one of the sheriffs of London, and on 9 November 1814 Birch entered on his duties as lord mayor. Tory though he was, he opposed the Corn Bill of 1815, and presided at a meeting of the livery in common hall on 23 February 1815, when he made a vigorous attack upon the intended prohibition of the free importation of foreign corn. The course he took on this occasion is commemorated by a medal struck in his honour on the obverse side of which is the bust of the lord mayor, and on the reverse a representation of a wheatsheaf, with the legend, 'Free Importation, Peace and Plenty.' During his mayoralty the marble statue of George III by Chantrey, the inscription on which was written by Birch, was placed in the council chamber of Guildhall.

Almost his last act as lord mayor was to lay the foundation-stone of the London Institution in Finsbury Circus (then called the Amphitheatre, Moorfields) on 4 November 1815. In 1836 Birch, who had for many years carried on his father's old business in Cornhill, disposed of it to Messrs. Ring & Brymer, the present proprietors.

He retired from the court of aldermen in 1810, and died at his house, 107 Guildford Street, London, on 10 Dec. 1841, aged 84.

His grandson, also named Samuel, would become an eminent Egyptologist at the British Museum.

== Notes ==
Civic offices
Preceded by Sir William Domville, Bt	Lord Mayor of London; 1813 – 1814	Succeeded by Sir Matthew Wood, Bt
