= 89th Regiment of Foot (1779) =

- Active: 19 October 1779 – 1783
- Country: Kingdom of Great Britain (1707–1800)
- Branch: British Army
- Type: Infantry

The 89th Regiment of Foot was an infantry regiment in the British Army from 1779 to 1783.

The regiment was raised in Worcestershire and posted to the Leeward Islands. The first Colonel-Commandant was Lieutenant-Colonel Hon. Lucius Ferdinand Cary, the only son of the 7th Viscount Falkland. He died in Tobago in August 1780.

The regiment returned to England in 1783 and was disbanded.

== Colonels ==
Colonels of the regiment were:

- 1779–1780: Lieutenant-Colonel Hon. Lucius Ferdinand Cary
- 1780–1783: Gen. Sir William Medows, KB
