= John Hudson (Indian Army officer) =

British officer in the Indian Army

Lieutenant-General Sir John Hudson KCB
- Born: 1833
- Died: 8 June 1893 (aged 59–60)
- Military career
- Allegiance: United Kingdom
- Branch: British Indian Army
- Service years: 1853–1893
- Rank: Lieutenant-General
- Commands: Rohilkhand brigade Quetta division Allahabad division Bombay Army
- Conflicts: Indian Mutiny; Second Anglo-Afghan War; Suakin Expedition
- Awards: Knight Commander of the Order of the Bath

Lieutenant-General Sir John Hudson KCB (1833 – 8 June 1893) was a British officer in the British Indian Army.

== Military career ==
Educated at the Royal Naval School, New Cross, Hudson was commissioned into the 64th Regiment of Foot in 1853. He served as deputy assistant adjutant-general during the response to the Indian Mutiny.

He commanded six companies of the 28th Punjab Infantry in 1879 during the Second Anglo-Afghan War and later commanded the Indian contingent during the Second Suakin Expedition in 1885. He went on to be commander of the Rohilkhand brigade of the Bengal Army in 1886, the Quetta division of the Indian Army in 1888 and the Allahabad division of the Bengal Army in 1889. He became Commander-in-Chief Bombay Army in April 1893 but was killed just two months later by a fall from his horse in June 1893.

== Sources ==
- Roberts, Lord (2001). Forty-one Years in India: From Subaltern to Commander-in-chief. Adamant Media Corporation. ISBN 978-1402177422.

Military offices
Preceded by Sir George Greaves	C-in-C, Bombay Army; 1893	Succeeded by Sir Charles Nairne
