= William Williamson (East India Company officer) =

William Williamson (died 1815) was a British Major-General who was commanding the forces at Bombay. He was in India by 1787, and was posted to the Cape of Good Hope in 1797. After being appointed commander of the forces in Bombay in 1813, he died in Baden in Germany on 22 July 1815.
