= Robert Nicholson (Indian Army officer) =

British military officer (1745–1821)

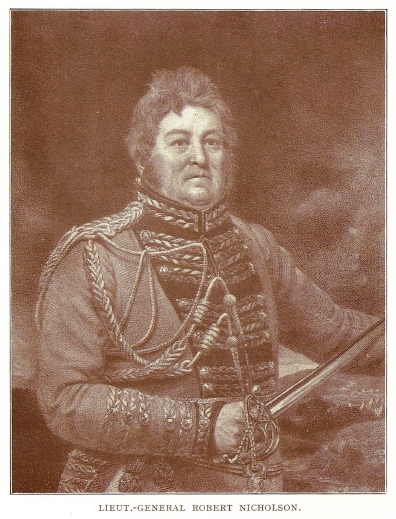
- Born: 1745
- Died: 1821 (aged 75–76); York Place, Marylebone, London
- Military career
- Allegiance: United Kingdom
- Branch: Indian Army
- Rank: Lieutenant-General
- Commands: Bombay Army

Lieutenant-General Robert Nicholson (1745–1821) was a British military officer on the Bombay establishment, who briefly commanded forces there in 1800.

== Military career ==
Robert Nicholson was the son of Alexander Nicholson and Mary Murray. In about 1763, he joined the military establishment of the Honourable East India Company at Bombay. He lost his leg at the siege of Barouche in 1772, but continued serving, rising to the Chief Engineer at Bombay and, from 1800, Commanding the troops of the Bombay Army. He retired to England in 1803.
