= Samuel Wilson (East India Company officer) =

Major-General Samuel Wilson was a career Bombay Army officer, and was commander in chief in Bombay in 1826. He retired in 1826 and went back to England after 46 years of service.
