= Charles Boye =

Bombay Army officer (died 1833)

- Died: 2 February 1833 (aged 68); Exmouth, Devon
- Military career
- Allegiance: East India Company
- Branch: Bombay Army
- Service years: 1776–1833
- Rank: Lieutenant-general
- Commands: II/4th Bombay Native Infantry; II/6th Bombay NI; I/3rd Bombay NI; I/8th Bombay NI; 9th Bombay NI; Bombay Army
- Conflicts: Second Anglo-Mysore War; Siege of Mangalore; Third Anglo-Mysore War; Siege of Darwar; Fourth Anglo-Mysore War; Second Anglo-Maratha War

Lieutenant-General Charles Boye (died 2 February 1833) was a Bombay Army officer. He was commander in chief in Bombay from 1815 to 24 February 1816. Enlisted in 1776 as a cadet, and returned to England in 1820, was promoted from major general to lieutenant general in 1821.
