= George Greaves (British Army officer) =

General Sir George Greaves GCB KCMG
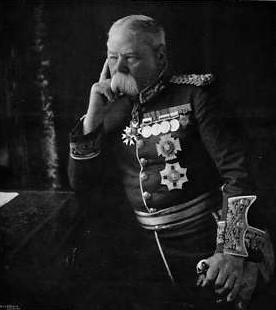
- Born: 9 November 1831; Windermere, Westmorland
- Died: 11 April 1922 (aged 90); Saundersfoot, Pembrokeshire
- Military career
- Allegiance: United Kingdom
- Branch: British Army
- Service years: 1849–1893
- Rank: General
- Commands: Bombay Army
- Conflicts: Indian Mutiny; Third Anglo-Ashanti War; Suakin Expedition
- Awards: Knight Grand Cross of the Order of the Bath; Knight Commander of the Order of St Michael and St George

General Sir George Richards Greaves GCB KCMG (9 November 1831 – 11 April 1922) was a British Army officer.

== Military career ==
Greaves was commissioned in November 1849. He served in the response to the Indian Rebellion of 1857 before becoming Deputy Assistant Adjutant-General for the Eusufzye Expedition in 1858 and Deputy Assistant Quartermaster-General in New Zealand in 1862. He went on to be Deputy Assistant Adjutant General at Headquarters in 1870, Chief of Staff for the Third Anglo-Ashanti War in 1873 and then became Chief of Staff and Chief Secretary to Government of Cyprus in 1878. After that he was appointed Assistant Adjutant General at Headquarters in 1874, Administrator of Cyprus in 1879 and Adjutant-General, India later that year. He then commanded a Division in the Bengal Army from 1885 before serving as Chief of Staff for the Second Suakin Expedition in 1885 and Commander-in-Chief of the Bombay Army from 1891. He retired in March 1893.

== Family ==
In 1859 Greaves married Ellen Hutchison; following the death of his first wife, he married Julia Rose Venour (née Morris) in 1908.

Military offices
Preceded by Peter Lumsden	Adjutant-General, India; 1879–1884	Succeeded by Thomas Baker
Preceded by The Duke of Connaught	C-in-C, Bombay Army; 1890–1893	Succeeded by Sir John Hudson
