= Hadley Lodge =

House in Barnet, London, United Kingdom

Coordinates: 51.6608°N 0.1938°W

The original Hadley Lodge after damage by fire in 1981.

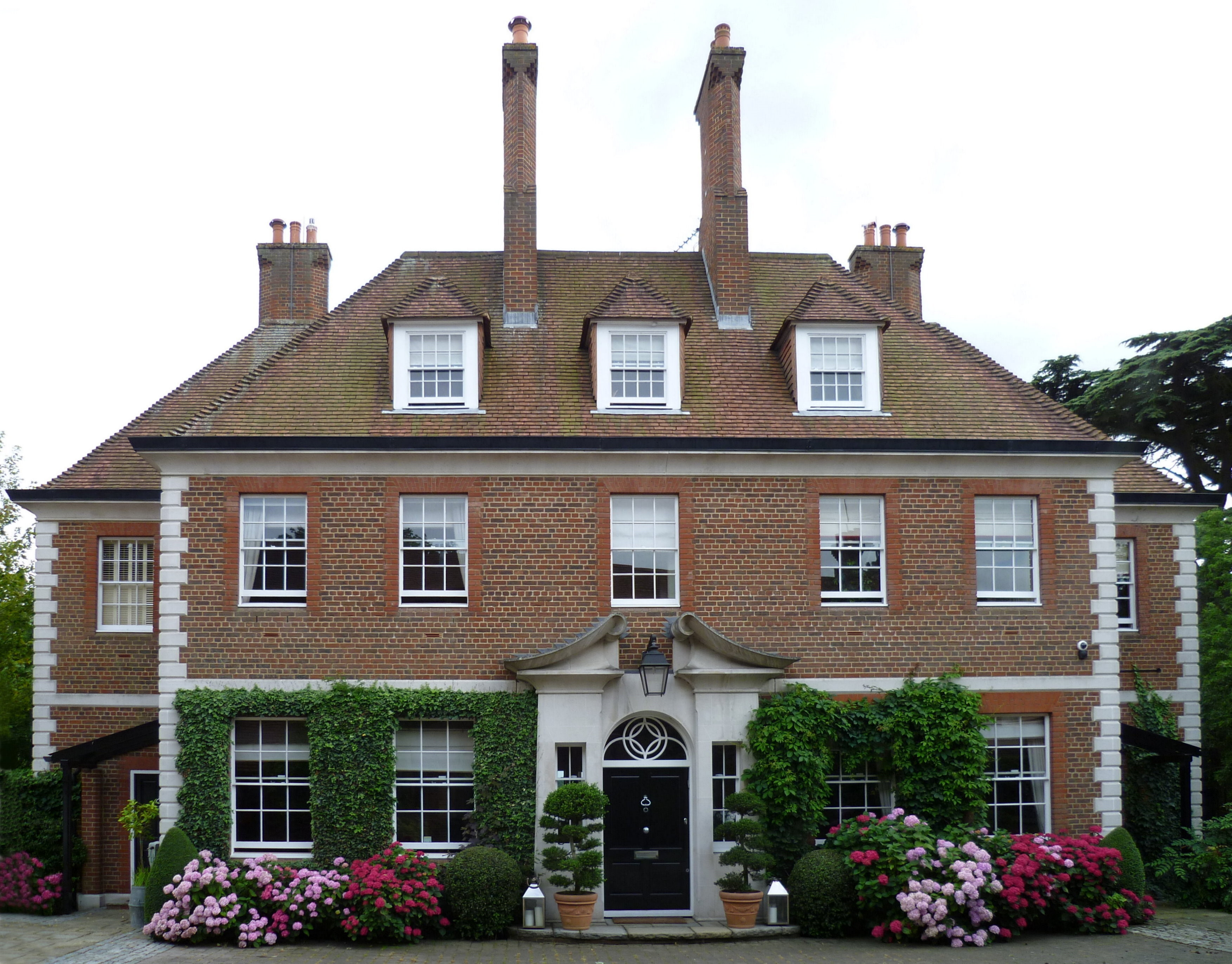
The current Hadley Lodge

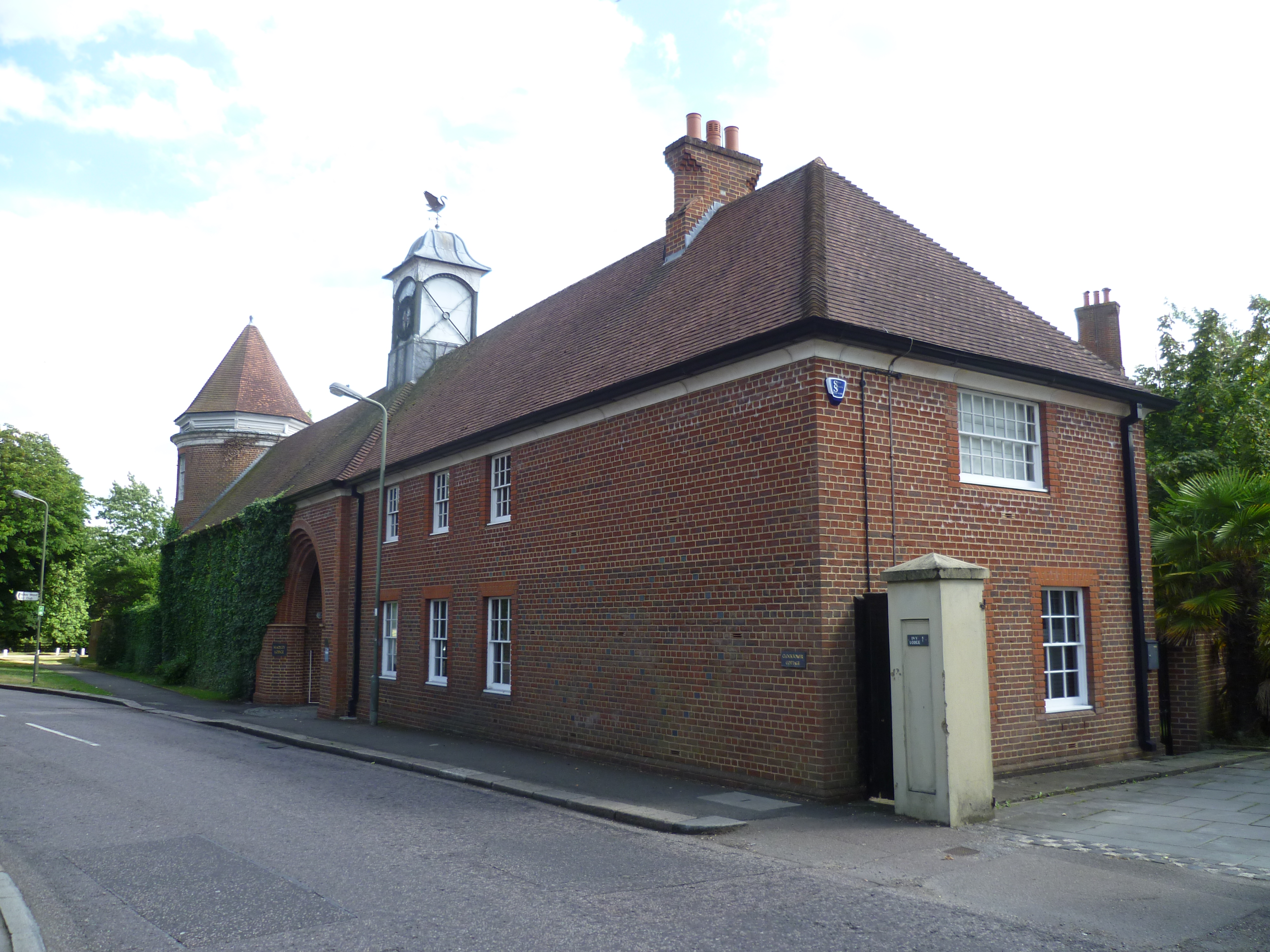
The Hadley Lodge gatehouse and clocktower

Hadley Lodge is a house in Hadley Green Road, Monken Hadley. The current house was completed around 1995 and replaced an earlier listed building of the same name that was destroyed by fire in 1981.

== Original Hadley Lodge ==
The original Hadley Lodge was built in the 18th century and destroyed by fire in 1981. The house was owned and occupied by Charles Jeffryes Cottrell, rector of Hadley 1786–1819, until his death in 1819. In 1852 the house was occupied by Charles Herbert Cottrell, author and magistrate in Hertfordshire and Wiltshire. In the mid twentieth century, Nikolaus Pevsner in The Buildings of England, noted the house's four-column ionic porch.

The original boundary wall adjoining Gladsmuir to Hadley Lodge is listed with Historic England.

== New Hadley Lodge ==
The new Hadley Lodge, completed around 1995, was designed by Joanna and Luke Gibbons in the style of Edwin Lutyens and offered for sale for around £2 million. The local authority, however, described it as "a little too robust and self assured for many tastes". The house has grounds of six acres and ten bedrooms (originally eight). In about 2004 the house was bought by Mark and Susan Wogman. In 2015, it was placed on the market for just under £8 million.
