= Charles Nairne =

British military officer

Lieutenant-General Sir Charles Nairne KCB
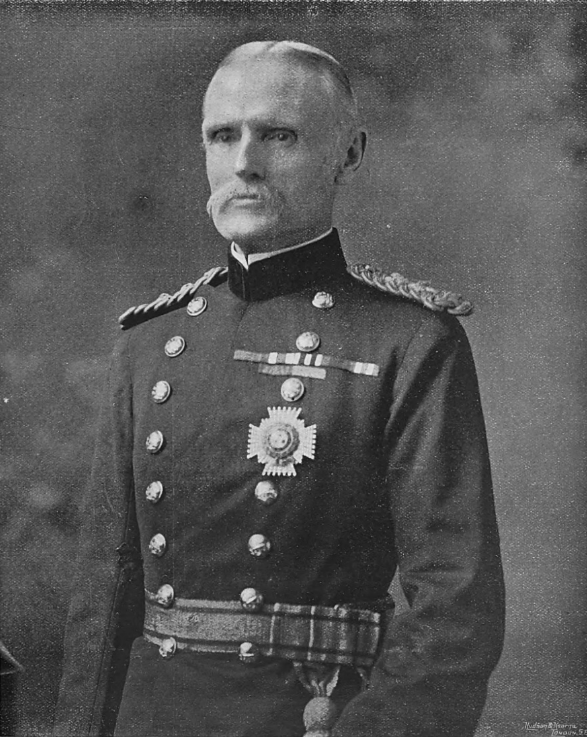
- Nairne in Bombay c.1898
- Born: 30 June 1836
- Died: 19 February 1899 (aged 62); London, England, United Kingdom
- Burial place: Charlton cemetery
- Military career
- Allegiance: East India Company; British India
- Branch: Bengal Army; Indian Army
- Rank: Lieutenant-General
- Commands: Bombay Command; Indian Army
- Conflicts: Indian Mutiny; Ambela Pass; Second Afghan War; Anglo-Egyptian War
- Awards: Knight Commander of the Order of the Bath; Order of the Medjidie, 3rd class

Lieutenant-General Sir Charles Edward Nairne KCB (30 June 1836 – 19 February 1899) was a British military officer who served in British India.

== Early life ==
He was the son of Captain Alexander Nairne, a military officer in the East India Company.

Educated at Addiscombe Military Seminary, Nairne was commissioned into the Bengal Artillery in 1855. Due to sickness he was only present for two and a half terms at Addiscombe, instead of the usual four, and this prevented him joining the Bengal Engineers.

== Career ==
During the Indian Mutiny in 1857 he was stationed mostly at Peshawar and only saw action towards its close. In 1863 he served in an expedition against the Yusufzai on the north-western frontier. He went on to serve as a Horse Battery Commander with the Peshawar Valley Field Force during the Second Afghan War from 1878 to 1880.

In 1882 he took part in the Anglo-Egyptian War and commanded the horse artillery at the Battle of Kassassin Lock and the Battle of Tel el-Kebir where he was mentioned in despatches. He was also appointed a Companion of the Order of the Bath (CB). In 1882 he became colonel of the depot staff of the horse artillery, and in 1885 commandant of the school of gunnery at Shoeburyness for the next two years. In 1887 he became Inspector-General of Artillery in India, serving in the role for five years. In 1890 he attained the rank of Major-general after 35 years service.

In 1892 Nairne was appointed to the command of the Division at Meerut, and the following year he became Commander-in-Chief of the Bombay Army (renamed Bombay Command in 1895). He was promoted Lieutenant-General in November 1895 and became a Knight Commander of the Order of the Bath (KCB) in June 1898. He was acting Commander-in-Chief, India from March to November 1898.

== Death ==
He died suddenly on 19 February 1899 and was buried with military honours at Charlton Cemetery in London on 22 February.

== Family ==
In 1860 he married Sophie Addison. His sister, Helen Catherine Nairne, who was born on 1 September 1843, was the mother of Sir Frederick Arnold-Baker.

== Sources ==
Lloyd, Ernest Marsh (1901). "Nairne, Charles Edward" . In Lee, Sidney (ed.). Dictionary of National Biography (1st supplement). London: Smith, Elder & Co.

Military offices
Preceded by Sir John Hudson	C-in-C, Bombay Army (Bombay Command from 1895); 1893–1898	Succeeded by Sir Robert Low
Preceded by Sir George White	Commander-in-Chief, India; March–November 1898	Succeeded by Sir William Lockhart
