= Lucius Cary (British Army officer) =

British Army officer and politician

Member of Parliament for Bridport
- In office 1774–1780

Personal details
- Born: 1735
- Died: 20 August 1780 (aged 44–45) Tobago, British West Indies (present-day Trinidad and Tobago)
- Children: 7, including Henry and Charles
- Parent: Lucius Charles Cary (father)
- Relatives: Alexander Leith (brother in law)
- Military career
- Allegiance: Great Britain
- Branch: Army
- Rank: Major
- Units: 2nd Foot Guards; 14th Foot; 74th Foot; 60th Foot; 89th Foot

Lucius Ferdinand Cary, Master of Falkland (1735–1780) was a British Army officer and politician who sat in the House of Commons from 1774 to 1780.

== Biography ==
Cary was the only son of Lucius Charles Cary, 7th Viscount Falkland and his first wife, Jane Butler, daughter of Richard Butler of London, a conveyancer. He was educated at Westminster School from 1747 to 1752 and joined the army. He was an Ensign in the 2nd Foot Guards in 1752. In 1755 he became captain in the 14th Foot which was stationed in Gibraltar for 8 years. He married Anne Leith, daughter of Colonel Alexander Leith, at Gibraltar on 28 November 1757. Her father died commanding artillery at the Siege of Havana in 1762. In 1762 Cary became major in the 74th Foot and was put on half-pay from 1763 to 1765. He was major in the 60th Foot in 1765 and was on half pay again from 1768 to 1779.

At the 1774 general election, Cary was elected Member of Parliament for Bridport unseating the sitting MP in a contest. In 1779 he resumed active military service as lieutenant-colonel commandant of the 89th Foot in the West Indies, and was generally absent from parliament. His brother in law Alexander Leith had a parallel career becoming MP for Tregony in 1774 and being posted to the West Indies in 1779.

Cary died in Tobago on 20 August 1780. He and his wife Anne had two sons and five daughters:

- Lucia Cary (July 1762 – 12 February 1801), married Lt-Col John Grattan and had issue
- Charlotte Maria Cary (November 1764 – bef. 1834), married Samuel Charteris
- Henry Thomas Cary, 8th Viscount Falkland (1766–1796)
- Charles John Cary, 9th Viscount Falkland (1768–1809)
- Lavinia Matilda Cary (5 November 1770 – ?)
- Almeria Augusta Cary (January 1772 – 24 Jun 1801), married Rev. William Digby
- Hon. Emilia Sophia Cary (March 1775 – aft. 1834), married Maj. Charles Thomas Grant in 1798

When he died he had a secret service pension of £500 per annum and his father applied successfully to the King for pensions of £100 per annum to each of Cary's five daughters, who were "left in extreme indigence by their father". His sons Henry and Charles succeeded in turn to the Viscountcy after the death of their grandfather.

Parliament of Great Britain
Preceded by Sambrooke Freeman; Thomas Coventry	Member of Parliament for Bridport; 1774–1780; With: Thomas Coventry	Succeeded by Thomas Scott; Richard Beckford
