= 74th Regiment of Foot (Invalids) =

Infantry regiment of the British Army

The 74th Regiment of Foot (Invalids) was an infantry regiment of the British Army from 1762 to 1768.

It was originally raised as a regiment of invalids in March 1762, and numbered the 117th Foot; it was renumbered as the 74th the following year, and disbanded in 1768.
