= Lawrence Nilson =

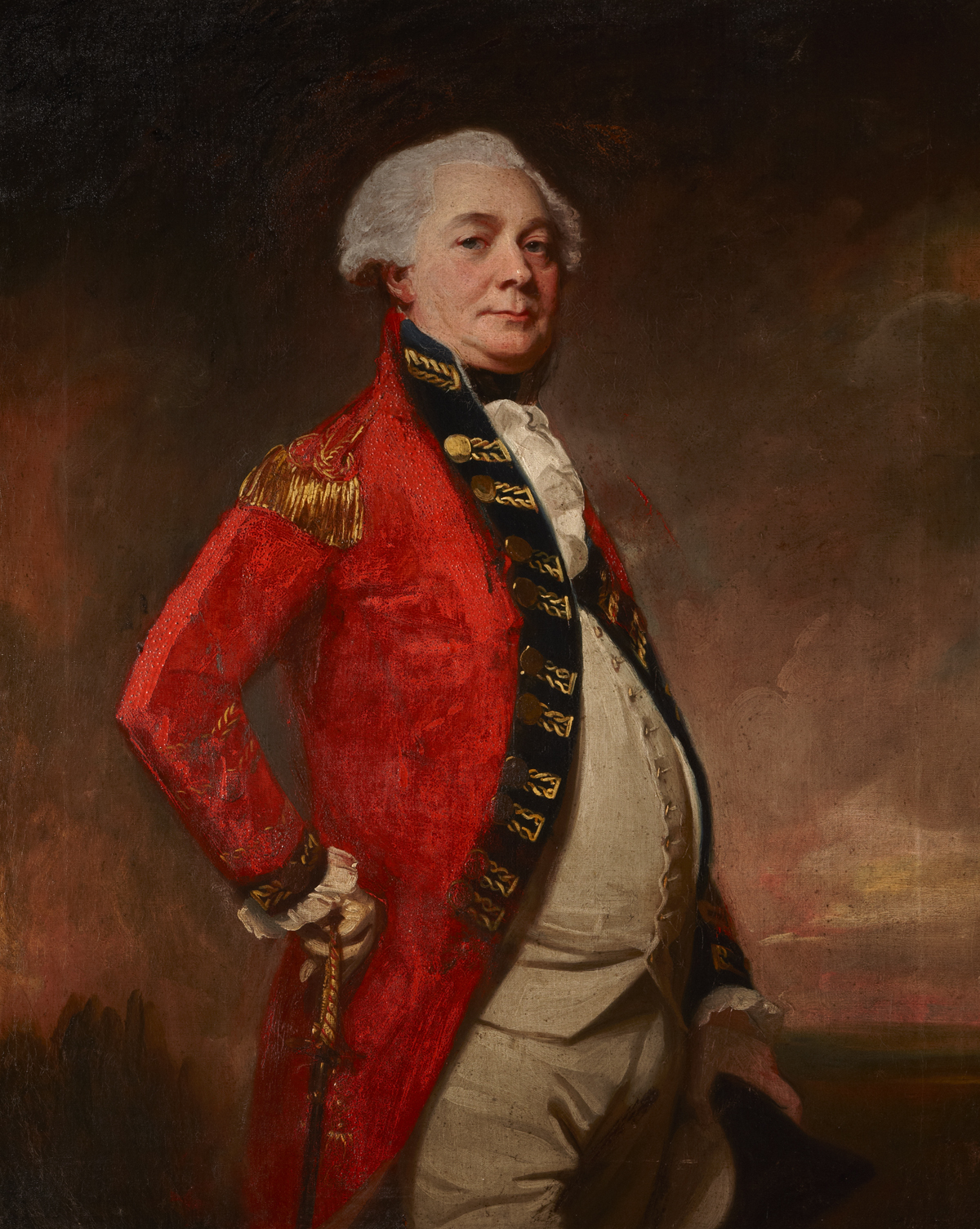
- painting by George Romney, 1791
- Born: 1734
- Died: 1811 (aged 76–77)
- Military career
- Allegiance: United Kingdom
- Branch: Bombay Army
- Rank: Brigadier-General
- Commands: Bombay Army
- Conflicts: Second Anglo-Mysore War

Brigadier-General Lawrence Nilson (1734–1811) was an East India Company Bombay Army officer.

== Military career ==
Nilson, then the first Chief Engineer of the Bombay Army, formed a company of Pioneer Lascars, comprising 100 men, in 1777. His company took part in the expedition to the Malabar Coast against Tipu Sultan's forces in 1782 during the Second Anglo-Mysore War. He became the Commander-in-chief of the Bombay Army on 6 January 1785 before retiring from that post on 6 September 1788.
