= Bombay Army =

- Active: 1668–1895 (as the Bombay Army); 1895–1908 (as the Bombay Command of the Indian Army)
- Allegiance: East India Company (1662–1861); British India (1861–1895)
- Size: 2,000 (1779); 44,000 (1876)
- Part of: Presidency armies
- Garrison/HQ: Pune, Pune district

The Bombay Army was the army of the Bombay Presidency, one of the three presidencies of British India within the British Empire.

It was established in 1668 and governed by the East India Company until the Government of India Act 1858 transferred all presidencies to the direct authority of the British Crown. On 1 April 1895 the army was incorporated into the newly created British Indian Army, and became known as the Bombay Command until 1908.

== History ==
=== 18th century ===
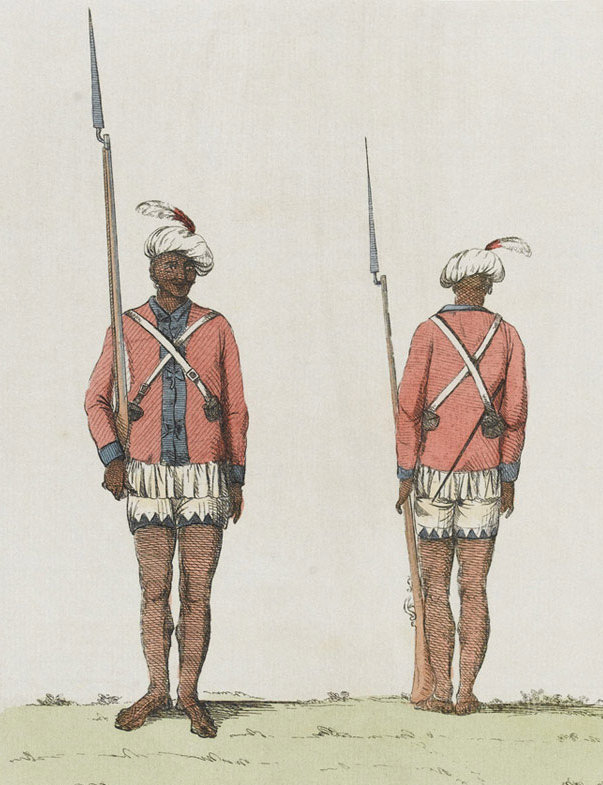
1773 illustration of the 3rd Battalion of Bombay Sepoys

In the early stages of Company rule in India, Bombay was rated as an unhealthy and unprofitable region. Accordingly, only a small garrison was maintained while emphasis was placed on creating a local navy (the "Bombay Marine") to control piracy. In 1742 the Bombay Army consisted of eight companies of European and Eurasian garrison troops, numbering 1,593 of all ranks. These had evolved from independent companies dating back as far as 1668 when the Company took over control of the city of Bombay.

The Mahars served in both Bombay Army and Marine battalions. Prior to the Indian Rebellion of 1857 they were heavily recruited and constituted between a fifth and a quarter of the entire Bombay Army.

By 1783 the Bombay Army had grown to 15,000 men, a force that was still significantly smaller than the other two Presidency armies. Recruitment from the 1750s on had however been expanded to include a majority of indigenous sepoys, initially employed as irregulars for particular campaigns. The first two regular sepoy battalions were raised in 1768, a third in 1760 and a fourth ten years later. The non-Indian (mostly British but also including Swiss and German mercenaries) element was organized in a single Bombay European Regiment.

In 1796 the Bombay Native Infantry was reorganized into four regiments, each of two battalions. The Bombay Foot Artillery, which traced its history back nearly 50 years prior to this date, was brought up to six companies in strength in 1797.

The Bombay Army was heavily involved in the First Maratha War and the defeat of Tipu Sultan of Mysore in 1799.

=== 19th century ===
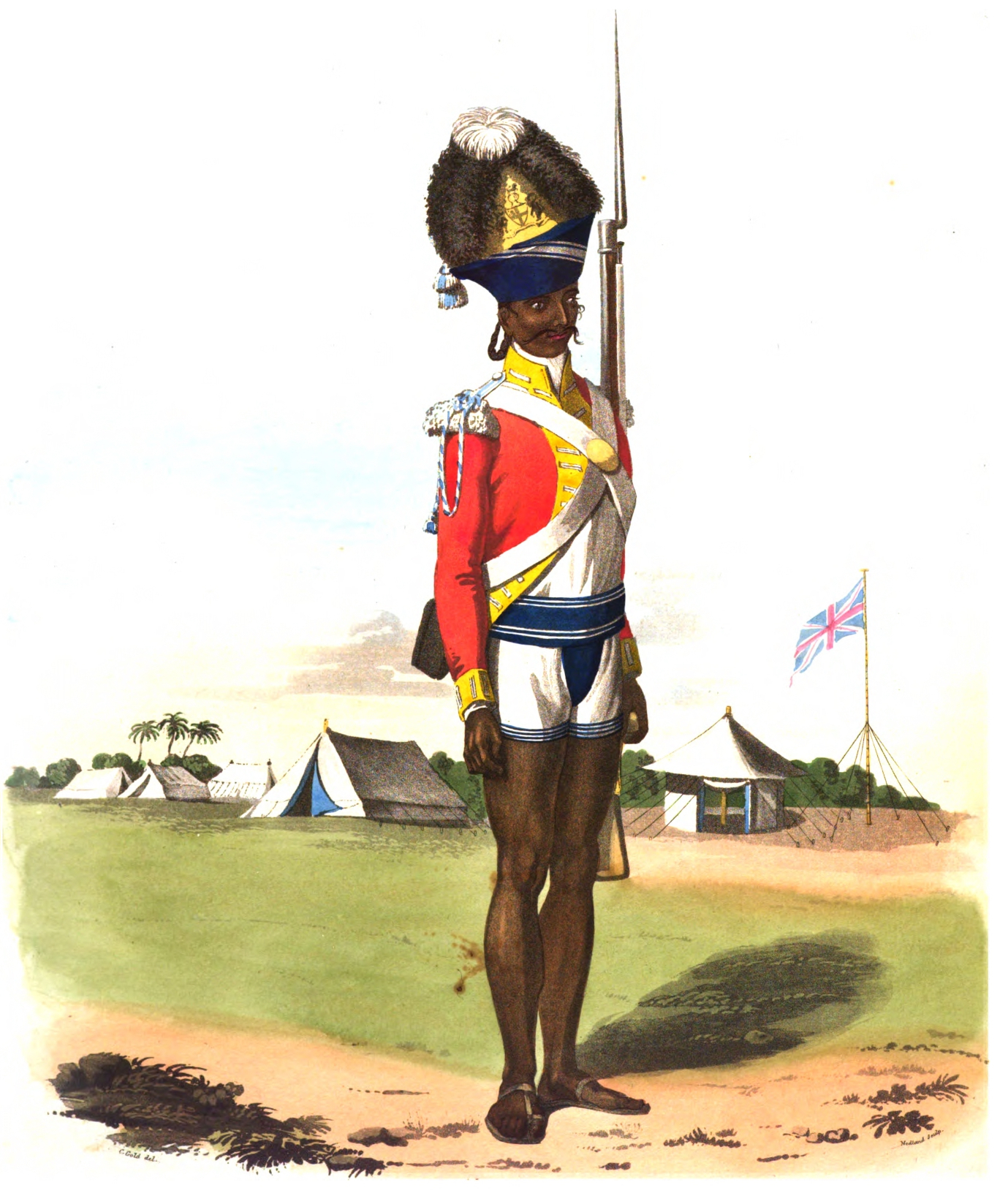
1806 illustration of a Bombay Army grenadier

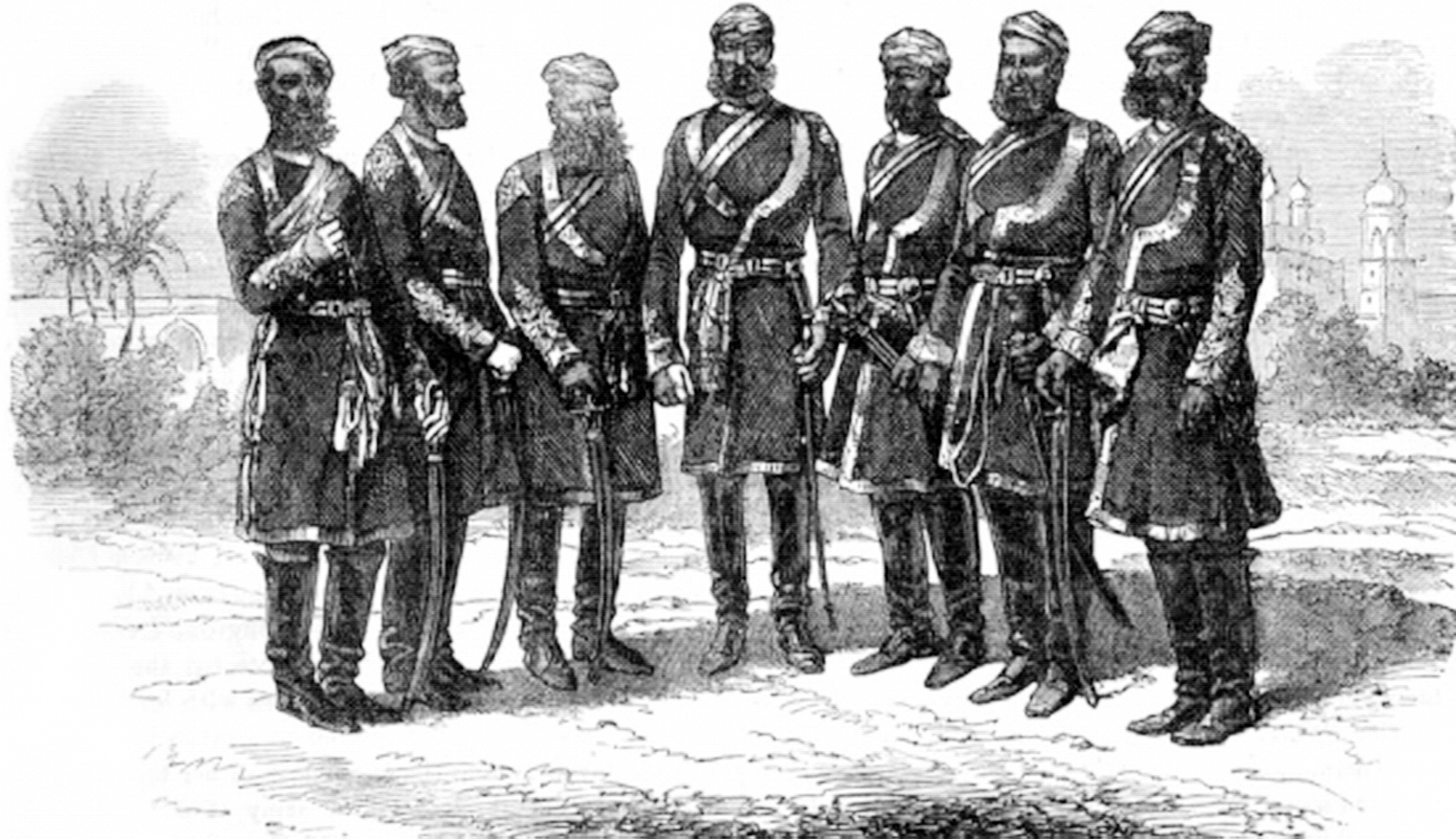
Indian officers of the Bombay Army in dress uniform, 1818

Prior to the cessation of Company rule in 1861, the Bombay Army played a substantial role in campaigns against the Bani Bu Ali in 1821, in North-Western India, notably the 1st Afghan War of 1838–1842, the Sind War of 1843, the 2nd Sikh War of 1848–49 and the Persian War of 1856-57. The Bombay Army had acquired responsibility for garrisoning Aden, and The 1st Bombay European Regiment, The Bombay Marine Battalion and the 24th Bombay Native Infantry all saw service there in 1839.

As of 1 January 1842 the Bombay Army's disposition was as follows:

- The Bombay Garrison
- The Poona Division – Headquartered in Poona
- The Northern Division – Headquartered in Ahmedabad
- The Mhow Brigade
- The Scinde Field Force
- Forces in Lower Scinde
- Forces Garrisoning the Asirgarh Fort
- Forces in and around Karrack Island (Kharg Island), in the Persian Gulf
- Forces in Aden.

The Bombay native infantry establishment continued to expand until it reached 26 regiments in 1845. Three Bombay Light Cavalry regiments were raised after 1817, plus a few troops of irregular horse. One brigade of Bombay Horse Artillery comprising both British and Indian personnel had been established by 1845, plus three battalions of foot artillery.

The Bombay Presidency's Army was also supplemented by regular British Army Regiments and in 1842 one cavalry and four infantry regiments were deployed on the "Bombay Establishment".

The Indian Rebellion of 1857 was almost entirely confined to the Bengal Army. Of the thirty-two Bombay infantry regiments in existence at the time only two mutinied. After some initial uncertainty as to the loyalty of the remainder, it was deemed possible to send most of the British troops in the Presidency to Bengal, while the Bombay sepoy and sowar (cavalry) units held the southern districts of the North-West Frontier. Some Bombay units saw active service during the repression of the rebellion in Central India.

=== Post mutiny ===
Following the transfer from East India Company rule to that of the British government in 1861 the Bombay Army underwent a series of changes. These included the disbandment of three regiments of Bombay Native Infantry and the recruitment of replacement units from the Beluchi population. Originally created as irregular units, the three "Belooch" regiments in their red trousers were to remain a conspicuous part of the Bombay Army for the remainder of its separate existence.

By 1864 the Bombay Army had been reorganised as follows:

- The Northern Division
- The Poona Division
- The Mhow Division
- The Scinde Division

With brigades at Bombay, Belgaum, Neemuch, Poona, Ahmednuggur, Nusseerabad and Deesa; as well as a garrison in Aden. During the remainder of the 19th century Bombay Army units participated in the 1868 Expedition to Abyssinia, the Second Afghan War of 1878–80, and the Third Anglo-Burmese War of 1885–87.

In 1895 the three separate Presidency Armies were abolished and the Army of India was divided into four commands, each commanded by a lieutenant-general. These comprised Madras (including Burma), Punjab (including the North West Frontier), Bengal and Bombay (including Aden).

=== End of the separate Bombay Army ===
In 1895 the three separate Presidency Armies began a process of unification which was not to be concluded until the Kitchener reforms of eight years later. As an initial step the Army of India was divided into four commands, each commanded by a lieutenant-general. These comprised Bombay (including Aden), Madras (including Burma), Punjab (including the North West Frontier) and Bengal. In 1903 the separately numbered regiments of the Bombay, Madras and Bengal Armies were unified in a single organisational sequence and the presidency affiliations disappeared.

=== Uniforms ===
As with many of the Indian infantry fighting regiments, the Bombay Native Infantry mostly adhered to British army regulations - the officers prior to 1856 having worn coatees with gold lace, shakos with a regimental plate and buckskin breeches. Studies of two British officers: one mounted, in service dress, the other in cold weather uniform; an officer from a grenadier company in full dress; two sepoys in cold weather dress; two sepoys in hot weather dress; a sepoy's blue soft cap and three sketches of grenadier uniform details can be seen at the National Army Museum. In addition, a surviving officers uniform to the 3rd Bombay Light Cavalry Regiment can also be seen at the NAM, the uniform with provenance to John Grant Malcolmson VC. For a brief time after January 1856, the Bombay infantry regiments transitioned to tunics with Carman denoting tunics were for those 'who are at the present without dress coatee'. 1856 pattern officers tunics were scarlet with light yellow facings and gold braid. Following the re-organisation in 1861, many of the Bombay Native Infantry regiments were reformed to rifle regiments adopting green cloth uniforms with red facings.

== Composition in 1856 ==
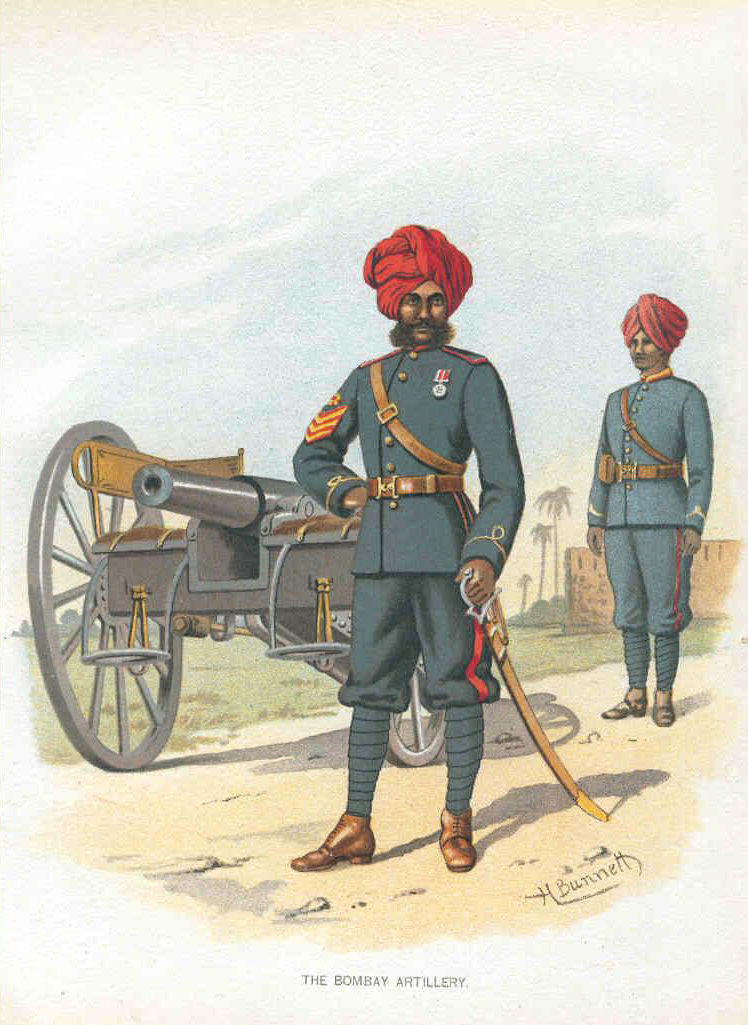
A havildar and gunner of Bombay Presidency Army Artillery

=== Native Light Cavalry ===
These were:

- 1st Regiment of Light Cavalry (Lancers)
- 2nd Regiment of Light Cavalry
- 3rd Regiment of Light Cavalry

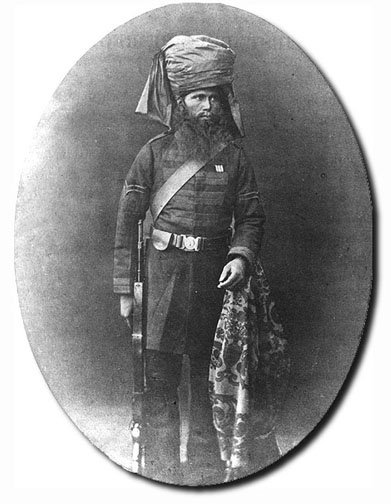
Lance Naik Wazir Khan of the 27th Bombay Native Infantry, 1865

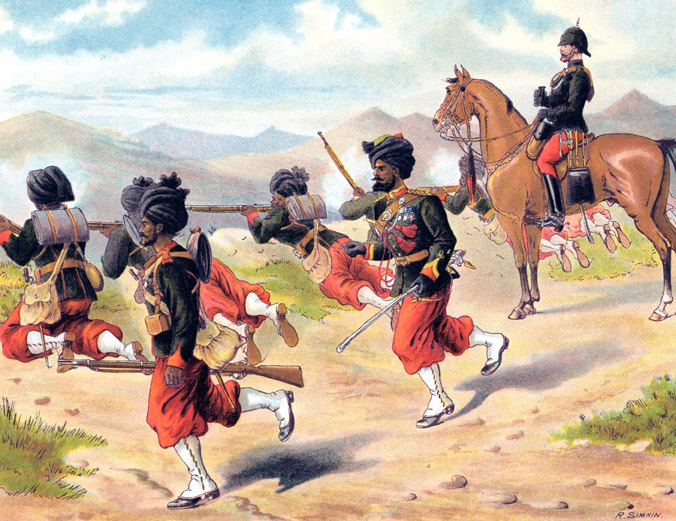
A British officer and soldiers of the 29th Bombay Native Infantry on field training, 1885

=== Artillery ===
These were:

==== Horse Artillery ====
4 European Troops

==== Foot Artillery ====
- 2 European battalions (4 companies each)
- 2 Native battalions (6 companies each)

=== Engineers ===
==== Corps of Royal Engineers ====
These were:

==== Corps of Sappers and Miners ====
These were:

- 1st Company
- 2nd Company

=== Infantry ===
==== European Infantry ====
These were:

- 1st European Fusiliers
- 2nd European Light Infantry
- 3rd European Regiment

==== Native Infantry ====
These were:

- 1st (Grenadier) Regiment of Native Infantry
- 2nd (Grenadier) Regiment of Native Infantry
- 3rd Regiment of Native Infantry
- 4th Regiment of Native Infantry
- 5th Regiment of Native Infantry
- 6th Regiment of Native Infantry
- 7th Regiment of Native Infantry
- 8th Regiment of Native Infantry
- 9th Regiment of Native Infantry
- 10th Regiment of Native Infantry
- 11th Regiment of Native Infantry
- 12th Regiment of Native Infantry
- 13th Regiment of Native Infantry
- 14th Regiment of Native Infantry
- 15th Regiment of Native Infantry
- 16th Regiment of Native Infantry
- 17th Regiment of Native Infantry
- 18th Regiment of Native Infantry
- 19th Regiment of Native Infantry
- 20th Regiment of Native Infantry
- 21st Regiment of Native Infantry
- 22nd Regiment of Native Infantry
- 23rd Regiment of Light Infantry
- 24th Regiment of Native Infantry
- 25th Regiment of Native Infantry
- 26th Regiment of Native Infantry
- 27th Regiment of Native Infantry
- 28th Regiment of Native Infantry
- 29th Regiment of Native Infantry

=== Irregular Units ===
These were:

- Poona Irregular Horse
- Guzerat Irregular Horse
- 1st Regiment of Scinde Irregular Horse
- 2nd Regiment of Scinde Irregular Horse
- Southern Mahratta Irregular Horse
- Cutch Irregular Horse
- Marine Battalion
- 1st Belooch Battalion
- 2nd Belooch Battalion
- Candeish Bheel Corps
- Rutnagherry Rangers
- Guzerat Police Corps
- Guzerat Cooly Police Corps
- Ghaut Police Corps
- Sawunt Warree Local Corps
- Kolapore Infantry Corps

== Units raised during 1857 Rebellion ==
=== Engineers ===
These were:

- 3rd Company, Corps of Sappers and Miners
- 4th Company, Corps of Sappers and Miners
- 5th Company, Corps of Sappers and Miners

=== Infantry ===
These were:

- 30th Regiment of Native Infantry
- 31st Regiment of Native Infantry
- 1st Extra Regiment of Native Infantry
- 2nd Extra Regiment of Native Infantry
- 1st Extra Battalion of Native Infantry
- 2nd Extra Battalion of Native Infantry
- 3rd Extra Battalion of Native Infantry
- 1st Regiment of Jacob's Rifles
- 2nd Regiment of Jacob's Rifles

=== Irregular Units ===
These were:

- 2nd Regiment of Southern Mahratta Irregular Horse
- 3rd Regiment of Scinde Irregular Horse
- 2nd Regiment, Candeish Bheel Corps
- Cutch Legion
- Sattara Local Corps

== Composition in 1864 ==
=== Native Cavalry ===
These were:

- 1st Light Cavalry (Lancers)
- 2nd Light Cavalry
- 3rd Light Cavalry
- Poona Horse
- 1st Scinde Horse
- 2nd Scinde Horse
- 3rd Scinde Horse
- Southern Mahratta Horse

=== Artillery ===
These were:

- E Brigade, Royal Horse Artillery (4 Troops)
- 18th Brigade, Royal Foot Artillery (6 companies)
- 21st Brigade, Royal Foot Artillery (6 companies)

=== Engineers ===
==== Corps of Royal Engineers ====
These were:

==== Corps of Sappers and Miners ====
These were:

- 1st Company
- 2nd Company
- 3rd Company
- 4th Company
- 5th Company

=== Native Infantry ===
These were:

- 1st (Grenadier) Native Infantry
- 2nd (Grenadier) Native Infantry
- 3rd Native Infantry
- 4th Native Infantry (Rifle Corps)
- 5th Light Infantry
- 6th Native Infantry
- 7th Native Infantry
- 8th Native Infantry
- 9th Native Infantry
- 10th Native Infantry
- 11th Native Infantry
- 12th Native Infantry
- 13th Native Infantry
- 14th Native Infantry
- 15th Native Infantry
- 16th Native Infantry
- 17th Native Infantry
- 18th Native Infantry
- 19th Native Infantry
- 20th Native Infantry
- 21st Native Infantry (Marine Battalion): Replaced original regiment.
- 22nd Native Infantry
- 23rd Light Infantry
- 24th Native Infantry
- 25th Light Infantry
- 26th Native Infantry
- 27th Native Infantry (1st Belooch Regiment): Replaced original regiment.
- 28th Native Infantry
- 29th Native Infantry (2nd Belooch Regiment): Replaced original regiment.
- 30th Native Infantry (Jacob's Rifles)

=== Irregular Units ===
These were:

- Candeish Bheel Corps
- Rutnagherry Rangers
- Guzerat Bheel Corps
- Guzerat Police Corps
- Guzerat Cooly Police Corps
- Tanna Police Corps
- Poona Irregular Horse
- Guzerat Irregular Horse
- Sawunt Warree Local Corps
- Sattara Local Corps

== Commanders in Chief ==
Commanders-in-Chief included:
Commander-in-Chief, Bombay Army

- Brigadier-General Lawrence Nilson (1785–1788)
- Major-General William Medows (1788–1790)
- Major-General Robert Abercromby (1790–1793)
  - Major-General James Balfour Commanding (1794–1797)
- Major-General James Stuart (1797–1800)
  - Major-General Robert Nicholson Commanding (1800–1801)
  - Major-General Richard Bowles Commanding (1800)
- Major-General Oliver Nicolls (1801–1808)
  - Major-General John Belasis Commanding
  - Major-General Richard Jones Commanding
- Lieutenant-General John Abercromby (1809–1813)
  - Major-General William Williamson Commanding (1813–1815)
  - Major-General Charles Boye Commanding (1815–1816)
- Lieutenant-General Sir Miles Nightingall (1816–1819)
- Lieutenant-General Sir Charles Colville (1819–1826)
  - Major-General Samuel Wilson Commanding (1826)
- Lieutenant-General Sir Thomas Bradford (1826–1829)
- Lieutenant-General Sir Thomas Beckwith (1829–1832)
- Lieutenant-General Sir Colin Halkett (1832–1834)
- Lieutenant-General Sir John Keane (1834–1838)
  - Major-General J. F. Fitzgerald (1838–1840)
- Lieutenant-General Sir Thomas McMahon (1840–1847)
- Lieutenant-General Sir Willoughby Cotton (1847–1850)
- Lieutenant-General Sir John Grey (1850–1852)
- Lieutenant-General Lord Frederick FitzClarence (1852–1854)
- Lieutenant-General Sir Henry Somerset (1855–1860)
- Lieutenant-General Sir Hugh Rose (1860)
- Lieutenant-General Sir William Mansfield (1860–1865)
- Lieutenant-General Sir Robert Napier (1865–1869)
- Lieutenant-General Sir Augustus Spencer (1869–1874)
- Lieutenant-General Sir Charles Staveley (1874–1878)
- Lieutenant-General Sir Henry Warre (1878–1881)
- Lieutenant-General Sir Arthur Hardinge (1881–1886)
- Lieutenant-General Sir Charles Arbuthnot (1886)
- Lieutenant-General The Duke of Connaught (1886–1890)
- Lieutenant-General Sir George Greaves (1890–1893)
- Lieutenant-General Sir John Hudson (1893)
- Lieutenant-General Sir Charles Nairne (1893–1895)

Commander-in-Chief, Bombay Command

- Lieutenant-General Sir Charles Nairne (1895–1898)
- Lieutenant-General Sir Robert Low (1898–1903)
- Lieutenant-General Sir Archibald Hunter (1903–1907)

== Table of Organisation ==
The following data has been retrieved from The Quarterly Indian Army List for 1 January 1901. This date was chosen for being in a suitable time period at the end of the Bombay Army.

	British personnel	Indian Officers	Other Ranks	Total
Native Cavalry Regiment	Commandant 4 Squadron Commanders 5 Squadron Officers Adjudant Medical Officer	Risaldar-Major 3 Risaldars 5 Ressaidars (including 1 Wardi-Major) 8 Jamadars	Kot-Daffadar Major, 8 Kot-Daffadars 32 Daffadars Farrier-Major, 40 Naiks	637 per regiment
Native Cavalry Regiment	Commandant 4 Squadron Commanders 5 Squadron Officers Adjudant Medical Officer	Risaldar-Major 3 Risaldars 5 Ressaidars (including 1 Wardi-Major) 8 Jamadars	518 Sowars (506 horsemen, 8 camel riders, 4 Ward Orderlies) 8 Trumpeters	637 per regiment
Mountain Artillery Battery	Captain 4 Subalterns	Subadar 3 Jamadars	Havildar Major, Pay Havildar, 10 Havildars 3 Daffadars 13 Naiks	373 per battery
Mountain Artillery Battery	Captain 4 Subalterns	Subadar 3 Jamadars	114 Gunners, 2 Trumpeters 191 Drivers, 1 Salutri, 2 Shoeing Smiths 26 Muleteers	373 per battery
Corps of Bombay Sappers and Miners	Commandant 2 Superintendents Adjudant 8 Company Commanders 6 Company Officers	6 Subadars 12 Jamadars	38 Havildars 62 Naiks	1144 total
Corps of Bombay Sappers and Miners	Warrant Officer, Regimental Sergeant Major Regimental Quartermaster Sergeant, 2 Quartermaster Segreant Instructors, 3 Company Sergeant Majors 23 British Non-commissioned Officers	6 Subadars 12 Jamadars	916 Sappers 12 Buglers 36 Drivers 12 recruits	1144 total
Native Infantry Regiment	Commandant 4 Double-company Commanders 3 Double-company Officers Adjudant Quartermaster Medical Officer	Subadar-Major 7 Subadars 8 Jamadars	40 Havildars 40 Naiks	839 per regiment
Native Infantry Regiment	Commandant 4 Double-company Commanders 3 Double-company Officers Adjudant Quartermaster Medical Officer	Subadar-Major 7 Subadars 8 Jamadars	16 Drummers 704 Sepoys (including 4 Ward Orderlies) 12 recruits	839 per regiment

Each Artillery battery was authorised 10 horses and 233 mules.

The Bombay Sappers and Miners were authorised 36 mules.

The 24th and 26th Regiments of Bombay Infantry were authorised 80 extra Sepoys each. Pioneer Regiments were authorised 24 Artificers each (2 Havildars, 2 Naik and 20 Sepoys) each. The Havildar and Naik Artificers were supernumerary NCOs.

== See also ==
- Presidency armies
- Bengal Army
- Madras Army
- The Grenadiers
- Baloch Regiment
- Bombay Presidency

== Sources ==
- Frederick, J. B. M. (1984). Lineage Book of British Land Forces 1660–1978, Volume II. Wakefield, United Kingdom: Microform Academic Publishers. ISBN 1-85117-008-1.
- Cadell, Patrick Robert (1938). History of the Bombay Army. Longmans, Green and Company, London. ASIN B00086OJJY.
- Raugh, Harold (2004). The Victorians at War, 1815–1914: An Encyclopedia of British Military History. ABC-CLIO Ltd. ISBN 978-1576079256.
