= Edmond Boddam =

Australian cricketer (1879–1959)

Personal information
- Born: 23 November 1879; Hobart, Tasmania, Australia
- Died: 9 September 1959 (aged 79); New Town, Tasmania, Australia

Domestic team information
- Years: Team
- 1910-1914: Tasmania
- Source: Cricinfo, 20 January 2016

Edmond Boddam MC (23 November 1879 – 9 September 1959) was an Australian cricketer. He played five first-class matches for Tasmania between 1910 and 1914.

He served with the Army Medical Corps in World War I and was awarded the MC in the 1916 Birthday Honours.

== See also ==
- List of Tasmanian representative cricketers
