= Andrew Ramsay (governor) =

Governor of Bombay in 1788

Andrew Ramsay was the officiating governor of Bombay during the British Raj from 9 January 1788 to 6 September 1788.

Political offices
Preceded by Rawson Hart Boddam	Governor of Bombay; 1788	Succeeded by William Medows
