= Robert Bowles (East India Company officer) =

Major General Robert Bowles (1744 – 1812) was an officer in the British East India Company Army (Bombay Army) for 35 years. He was commander in chief in Bombay in 1800.
