= Charles Herbert Cottrell =

Charles Herbert Cottrell (27 November 1806 – 9 November 1860) was an Englishman who travelled to Siberia in 1840–41, produced an account of the experience, and translated plays and non-fiction works from German to English. At home, he qualified as a barrister and was a magistrate of Hertfordshire and Wiltshire.

== Early life and family ==
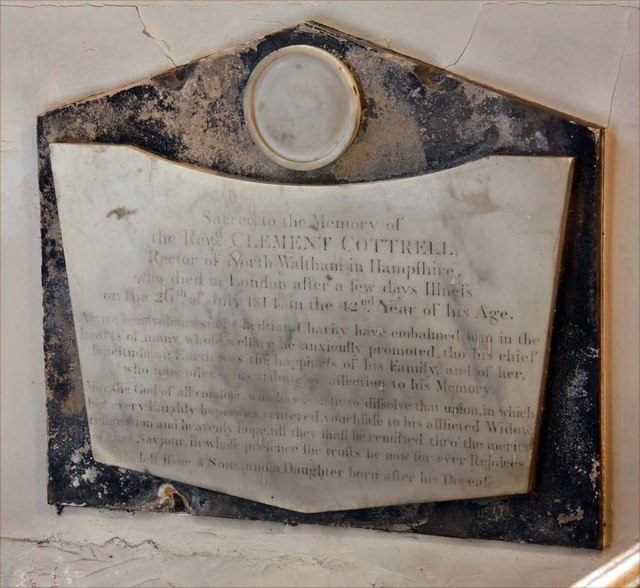
Monument to Clement Cottrell (died in London 26 July 1814) in St Mary the Virgin, Monken Hadley

Cottrell was born in Monken Hadley on 27 November 1806 to the Reverend Clement Cottrell and Georgiana Cottrell. He received his advanced education at Pembroke College, University of Cambridge, from where he received his M.A.

According to John Burke, the Cottrell family had its origins in the French Albigenses. Burke wrote that "Cotterel the Norman" was given land in Derby by King Henry III in 1235. An 1852 gazetteer reported that Charles Herbert Cottrell was descended from Sir Charles Lodowick Cotterell, who was master of ceremonies at the end of the seventeenth century, and on the maternal side from Chaloner Chute of Hampshire who was speaker of Cromwell's parliament.

== Career ==
Cottrell qualified as a barrister and was also a magistrate in Hertfordshire and Wiltshire.

He wrote an account of his travels in Siberia in 1840-41 which was published in London in 1842. He was fluent in German and Italian and translated a play by Friedrich Schiller into English as well as a work by the Prussian Egyptologist, Karl Richard Lepsius and Baron von Bunsen's Ägyptens Stelle in der Weltgeschichte (Egypt's Place in Universal History).

== Monken Hadley ==
Charles Herbert Cottrell succeeded to the Cottrell estate on the death of his uncle, Charles Cottrell of Hadley, in 1829. He probably acquired Hadley Lodge (destroyed by fire 1981) in Monken Hadley at the same time. He is recorded as living there in 1852 and was probably living there at the time of his death. In 1860, Cottrell was named as the chairman of the local board of The Society of Arts for Barnet.

== Death and legacy ==
Cottrell died on 9 November 1860. His account of his travels in Siberia was republished in the British Library's Historical Print Editions series in 2011.

== Selected publications ==
=== As author ===
- Recollections of Siberia, in the Years 1840 and 1841. John W. Parker, London, 1842.
- Religious movements of Germany in the nineteenth century. John Petheram, London, 1849.

=== As translator ===
- Schiller, Friedrich. (1843) Don Carlos, Infante of Spain; A dramatic poem, in five acts; translated from the German of Schiller. Barnet: J.J. Cowing. London: Longman, Brown, Green and Longman.
- Lepsius, R. (1846) A Tour from Thebes to the Peninsula of Sinai, &c.. London. (Translator into English)
- Bunsen, Christian Karl Josias. (1848) Egypt's Place in Universal History: An historical investigation in five books. London: Longman, Brown, Green, and Longmans. (Translator into English)
