= Rawson Hart Boddam =

British Governor of Bombay

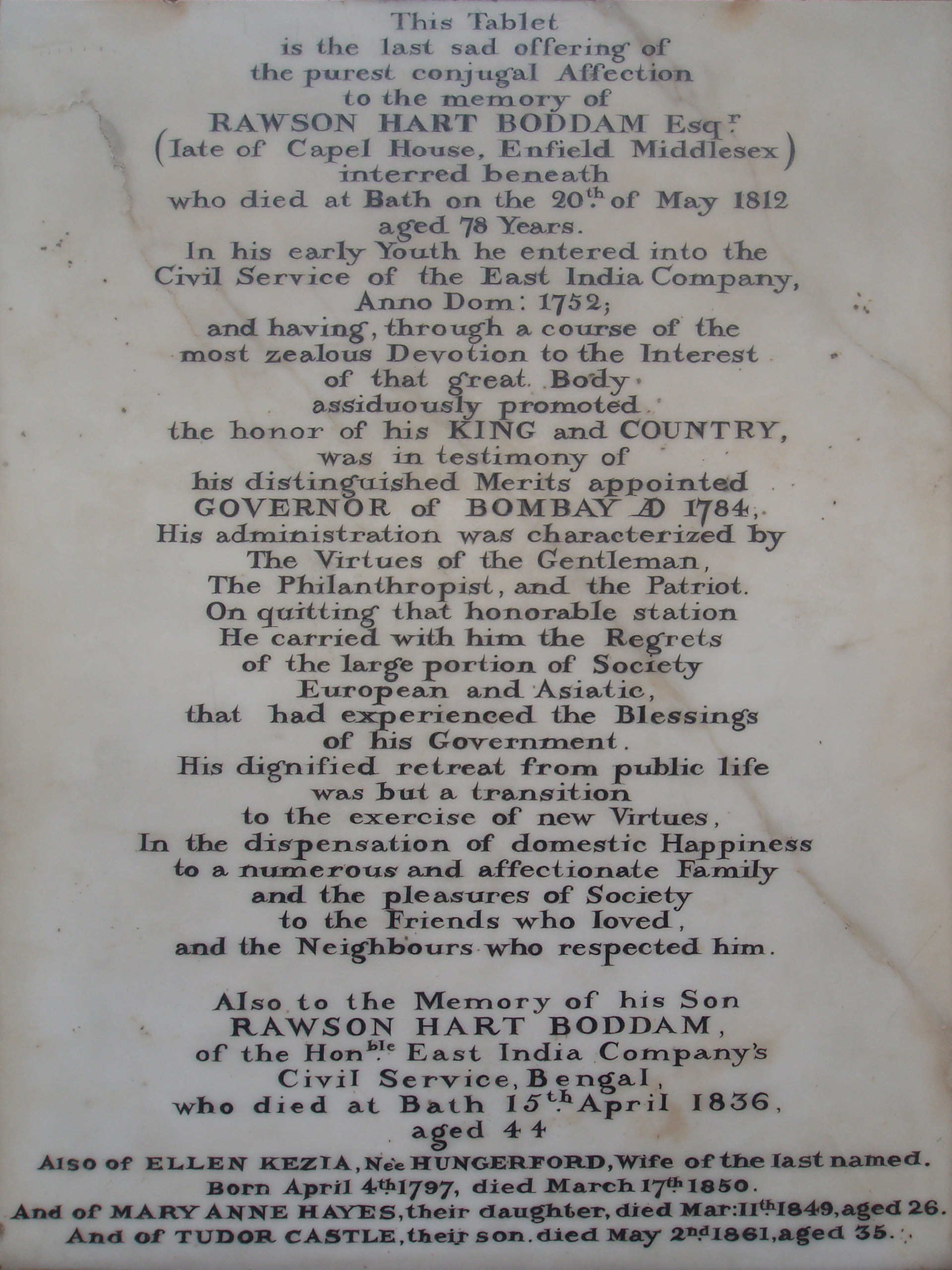
The epitaph of Rawson Hart Boddam, Governor of Bombay (1784 - 1788), in Bath Abbey

Rawson Hart Boddam (1734 – 20 May 1812, Bath) was a Governor of the Bombay Presidency during the rule of the East India Company in British India from 1784 to 1788.

Boddam entered East India Company service in 1752. In 1760 he married Mary Sclater, sister of the Eliza Draper for whom Laurence Sterne wrote his Journal to Eliza; but Mary died soon after the birth of a son Charles (1762–1811) and is buried in St. Thomas Cathedral, Mumbai.

Rawson Hart Boddam was the first Governor of Bombay to be paid entirely by salary, at an annual rate of nearly £10,000. By a second wife, Eliza Maria Tudor, he had nine children, and settled at Capel House, Bull's Cross, near Enfield on his return to England. He died 'aged 78 years' in May 1812. In the 1920s a portrait was in the possession of Mrs. Hungerford Meyer Boddam, of Capel House, Guildford.

Political offices
Preceded by William Hornby	Governor of Bombay; 1784–1788	Succeeded by Andrew Ramsay
