= Charles Boddam =

Charles Boddam (1762–1811) was born in India, the son of Rawson Hart Boddam. He joined the East India Company as a writer in 1780. In 1793, Boddam was appointed to Saran district as Judge of Diwani Adawlut and Magistrate. He died at Fort William, India on 13 August 1811.

Between April 1794 and April 1806 he lived in an impressive neo-classical house in Chhapra, Bihar. A watercolour of the house, belonging to about 1810, is preserved in the British Library, number Add.Or.3203.

Boddam was a scholar of Persian and made a translation of the Rāmāyaṇa from Persian, the latter in turn prepared from the Sanskrit in about 1794 by Anand G'yan, a Professor at the Benares Sanskrit College. The English translation is preserved among Boddam's papers in the British Library.

Boddam also collected Arabic manuscripts, some of which he acquired from the collection of Henry Vansittart. Among these is a copy of the commentary at-Talwih fi Kashfi Haqaiq at Tanqih (التلويح إلى کشف حقائق التنقيح) of Al-Taftazani, which carries Boddam's signature and the date “Calcutta, May 1st, 1787.” The manuscript was cataloged by Otto Loth in his Catalogue of the Arabic Manuscripts in the Library of the India Office.
