= Ralph Cudworth (died 1624) =

English Anglican minister and scholar (1572/3-1624)

The Reverend Ralph Cudworth
- Born: 1573; Oldham, Lancashire, England
- Died: 1624; Aller, Somerset, England
- Education: Emmanuel College, Cambridge: (BA; BD; MA; DD)
- Occupations: Clergyman; Theologian
- Spouse: Mary Machell (c.1582–1634) (m. 1611)
- Children: James Cudworth; Elizabeth Cudworth; Ralph Cudworth; Mary Cudworth; John Cudworth; Jane/Joan Cudworth

Ecclesiastical career
- Religion: Christianity
- Church: Church of England
- Ordained: 1599 (priest)
- Offices held: Curate, Westley Waterless (1599); Lecturer, St Andrew's, Cambridge (1602); Vicar, Coggeshall (1606–8); Rector, Aller (1610–24); Chaplain to James I

Ralph Cudworth (/ˈreɪf ˈkʌdwɜːrθ/; 1572/3–1624) was a scholar and conforming Anglican clergyman of puritan sympathies who is best known as the father of the philosopher Ralph Cudworth (1617–88), and the Plymouth Colony emigrant, soldier, and colonist, General James Cudworth (1612–82).

A student, graduate, and Fellow of Emmanuel College, Cambridge, he was recognized by his more famous contemporaries for his scholarship and preaching. He was Rector of the College living of Aller, Somerset (1610–24), and later became one of the chaplains to James I. His own calling and university connections provide the intellectual background to the careers of his children, reinforced by family connections, through his marriage with the puritan magistracy and promoters of the nonconformist emigrations to New England.

== Ancestry ==
The Cudworth family reputedly originated in Cudworth (near Barnsley), Yorkshire, moving to Lancashire with the marriage (c.1377) of John de Cudworth (d.1384) and Margery (d.1384), daughter of Richard de Oldham (living 1354), lord of the manor of Werneth, Oldham. The Cudworths of Werneth Hall, Oldham, were lords of the manor of Werneth/Oldham, until 1683.

Cudworth was the posthumously-born second son of Ralph Cudworth (d.1572) of Werneth Hall, Oldham, and his wife Jane, daughter of Arthur Assheton (d.1591) of Clegg Hall, Rochdale, Lancashire. Cudworth was born some time after his father's death (between September 1572 and April 1573), and was baptised at Oldham (2 September 1573).

Ancestors of Ralph Cudworth (died 1624)

8. John Cudworth (d.1555) Werneth, Oldham
4. Ralph Cudworth (d.1558) of Werneth, Oldham
9. Elizabeth Chetham
2. Ralph Cudworth (d.1572) of Werneth, Oldham
10. Alexander Lees of Ashton-under-Lyne, Lancashire
5. Agnes Lees
1. Ralph Cudworth
6. Arthur Assheton (d.1591) of Clegg, Littleborough
3. Jane Assheton

== Career ==
=== Pensioner, student, and Fellow of Emmanuel College (1588–1609) ===
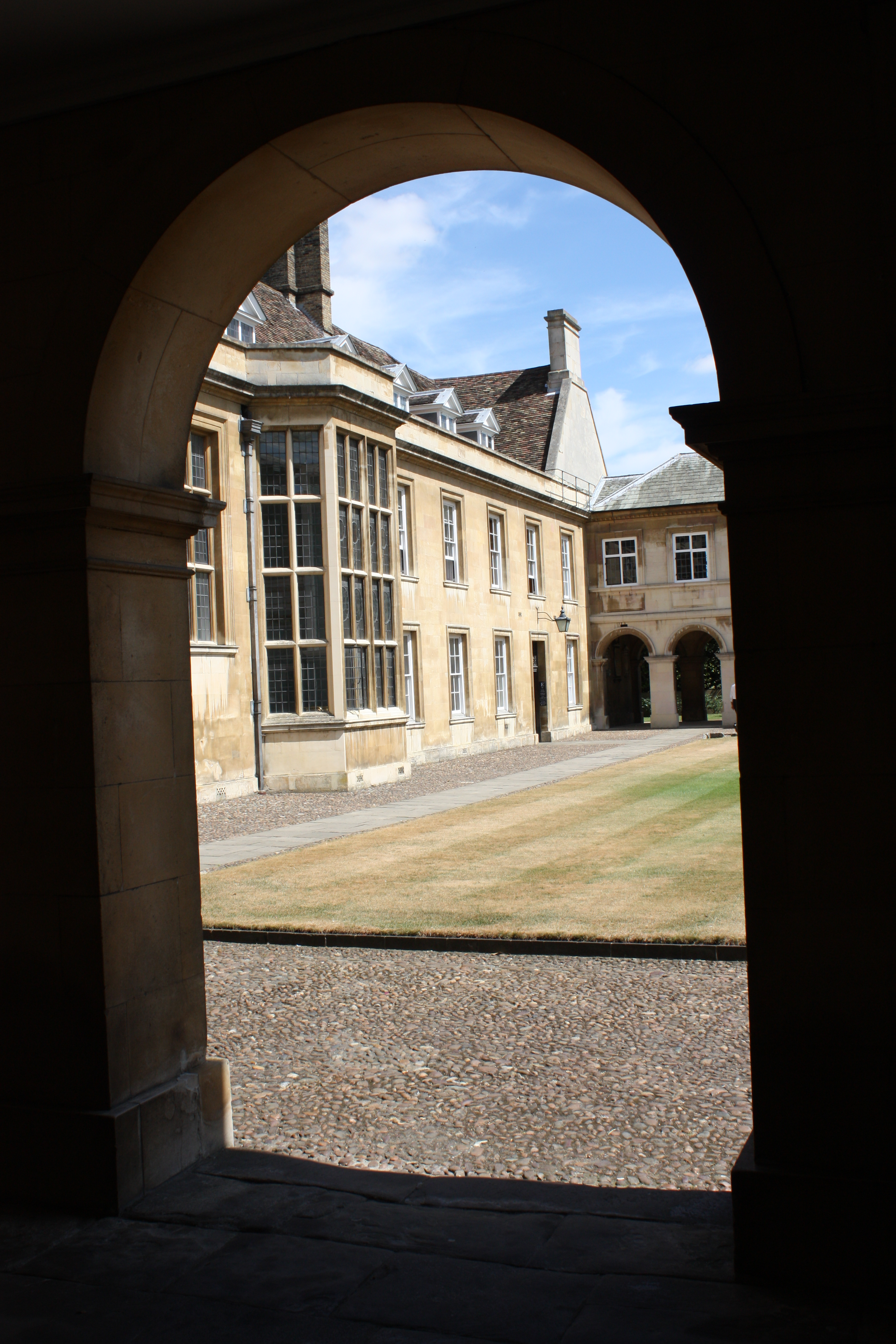
Emmanuel College, Cambridge

Cudworth matriculated (1588/9) at Emmanuel College and graduated BA (1592/3) and MA (1596). Emmanuel College (founded by Sir Walter Mildmay (1584), and under the direction of its first Master, Laurence Chaderton) was, from its inception, a stronghold of Reformist, Puritan and Calvinist teaching, which shaped the development of puritan ministry, and contributed largely to the emigrant ministry in America. He was ordained a priest (1599) by Richard Bancroft, and was appointed to the Curiate of Westley Waterless, Cambridgeshire (1599).

He was already a Fellow of Emmanuel College in 1600, when he donated manuscript volumes, of Norwich Cathedral Priory origin, to the College Library. These included a twelfth-thirteenth century Commentary on St Matthew by Rabanus Maurus, a thirteenth-fourteenth century collection of eight tracts by Thomas Aquinas, a decorated English fourteenth-century copy of the Moralia of Gregory the Great (all on vellum), and a Tractatus Patriarchae Antiocheni, written by the Norwich monk John Stowe, relating to the Council of Basle, 1431 in a fifteenth century English hand (on paper): this was the volume belonging to Robert Talbot which had been inspected by John Bale. (Cudworth's donor inscriptions, dated 1600, describe himself as "Socius".) In February 1602, he signed the Album amicorum of Frederick Kemener.

Cudworth was awarded the degree of Bachelor of Divinity (1603). He had come particularly under the influence of the godly divine William Perkins (of Christ's College, Cambridge), whom he succeeded as Lecturer of the Parish Church of St Andrew the Great, Cambridge (1602). Perkins's pupil, William Bedell, was a slightly older contemporary of Cudworth at Emmanuel College. At the request of Perkins's friends and executor, Cudworth (who was then lecturing on the Epistles of St Paul) edited (and brought to completion) Perkins's Commentary on the first five chapters of St Paul's Epistle to the Galatians (1604), which was dedicated, by Cudworth, to Robert, 3rd Lord Rich (later 1st Earl of Warwick). To it he added his own commentary on the sixth chapter, which he dedicated to the puritan Norfolk magistrate, sheriff and MP, Sir Bassingbourn Gawdy of West Harling. Cudworth himself indicates that this is his first published writing: "Not having taken pensill in hande before... the first fruits of my labours, a simple floure growing in a schollars garden."

It is argued that Cudworth may be the translator ("R.C.") of Henri Estienne's work Apologie Pour Herodote, published as A World of Wonders (1607). He was presented by Robert, Lord Rich to the Vicariate of Coggeshall, Essex (1606), to replace Thomas Stoughton who had been deprived by High Commission for nonconformism. However, he resigned this position (March 1608), and was licensed to preach from the pulpit (ad contionand) by the Chancellor and Scholars of the University of Cambridge (November 1609). After John Davenant had been appointed Lady Margaret's Professor of Divinity (February 1609/10), Cudworth confided, to Samuel Ward, his plans to apply for the rectorate of Aller, Somerset, which advowson belonged to the college. He was successful, and was appointed as Rector (1610).

=== Marriage (1611) and chaplain to James I ===
Cudworth married Mary Machell (c.1582–1634) at Southwark (18 June 1611) who had been a nurse ("nutrix") to Henry, Prince of Wales, eldest son of James I. Mosheim remarked that Cudworth was admitted among those concerned in the King's private devotions: he was one of the chaplains to James I.

Machell family connections with Emmanuel College

A pedigree tradition (reinforced by a more recent claim) indicates that Mary was the daughter of Mathew Machell and Mary Lewkenor (sister of Sir Edward Lewknor, MP for Denham Hall (near Bury St Edmunds)). Lewknor was a central figure (with the Jermyn and Heigham families) among the puritan East Anglian gentry, and had strong connections with Emmanuel College. Lewknor's mother-in-law, Martha Heigham, established (in her will) a scholarship at Emmanuel (1593), on behalf of Timothy Oldmayne alias Pricke, son of her minister at Denham; Lewknor (as her sole executor) was responsible for its implementation. Martha's nephew, Sir Robert Jermyn of Rushbrooke Hall, Suffolk (Lewknor's close parliamentary associate) also endowed a Fellowship at the college, and his two sons studied at Emmanuel during the 1590s.

In turn, Lewknor's sons attended the college during the early 1600s; and Mathew Machell's son, John, bore the standard at Lewknor's heraldic funeral at Denham (January 1605/06). Lewknor's uncle, the Edwardian courtier Sir Thomas Wroth, was the husband of Mary Rich (daughter of Richard, 1st Lord Rich), placing him within the family and sphere of Cudworth's patron, Lord Rich. Of more present consequence, Mary's aunt, Jane Machell, was the wife of Richard Rich of Leez (d.1598) (acknowledged natural son of Richard, 1st Lord Rich): Mary (Machell) Cudworth was therefore first cousin to Sir Nathaniel Rich and to his sister Margaret, who married (1614) Sir Thomas Wroth of Petherton Park, Bridgwater, Somerset (grandson of the courtier). This remains true for the alternative theory that Mary (Machell) Cudworth was the daughter of Mathew Machell's elder brother, John, and his second wife Ursula Hynde. These Machell brothers were the sons of John Machell (d.1558), Sheriff of London (1555–56), and uterine cousins of the author Thomas Lodge.

=== Rector of Aller, Somerset (1610–24) ===
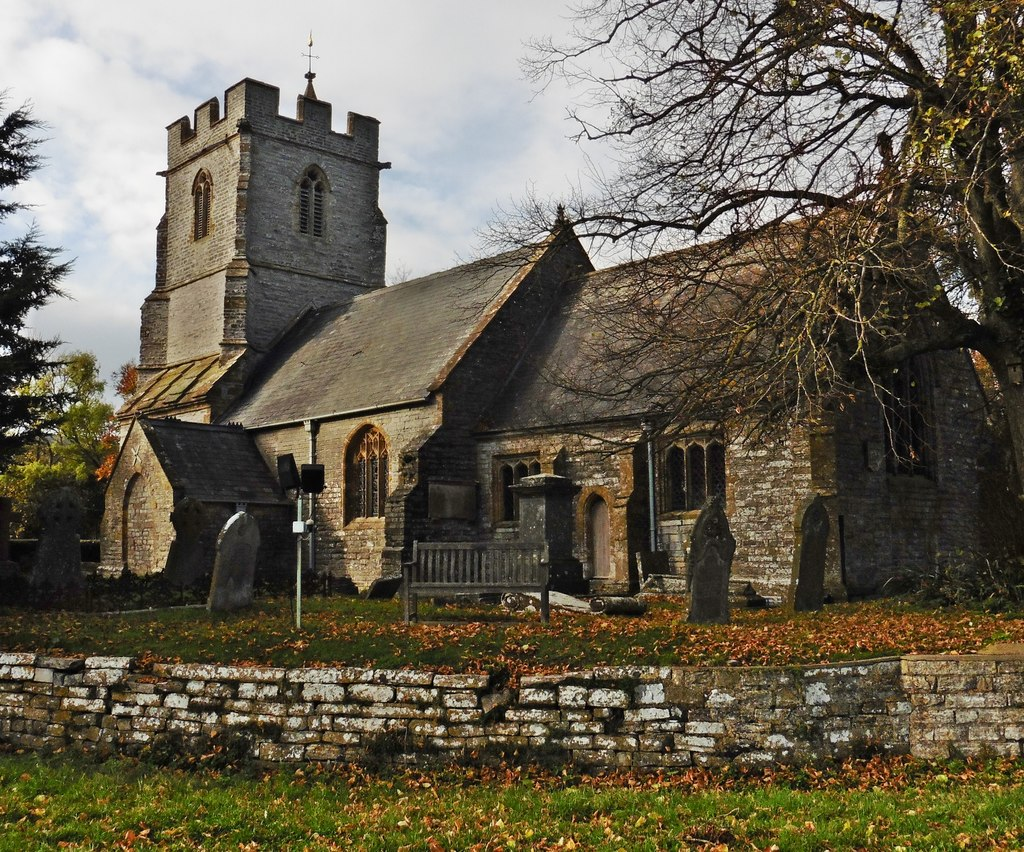
Parish Church of St Andrew, Aller, Somerset: where Ralph Cudworth was Rector (1610–24).

Ralph and Mary settled at Aller, Somerset (8 miles from Bridgwater), where their children (listed below) were christened during the ensuing decade. Cudworth continued to pursue his scholarly interests. Although the publishing of William Perkins's Treatise of the Cases of Conscience had been entrusted to Thomas Pickering of Emmanuel College (1606), this became Cudworth's subject, and he was associated with William Crashaw in an edition of 1613. His edition of the Galatians commentary was republished (1617), and he wrote (January 1618) to James Ussher of Emmanuel seeking advice and criticism of a work, The Cases of Conscience in Family, Church and Commonwealth on which he was engaged, sending also news of old college friends and complaining of the agueish climate at Aller.

Introducing his own work (1650), Joseph Hall wrote that Cudworth (his "ancient and learned colleague") had, with much labour, finished the task of preparing a complete Body of Case-Divinity but that it remained unpublished: he called Ralph Cudworth (Jnr) "his worthy Sonne, the just heyre of his Fathers great abilities". Cudworth was awarded the degree of Doctor of Divinity (1619).

=== Will and death (1624) ===
Cudworth died at Aller (Autumn 1624), declaring a nuncupative will (7 August 1624) before Anthony Earbury, the puritan Prebendary of Wherwell and Vicar of Westonzoyland (1617–39), and Dame Margaret Wroth. Earbury had been associated with the Millenary Petition of 1603, was one of the puritan representatives at the Hampton Court Conference, and was author of the bill accusing Richard Bancroft of treason (1604); both he and Cudworth were among the dedicatees of Richard Bernard's 1621 edition of The Faithfull Shepherd.

Dr Cudworth's widow Mary remarried to Dr John Stoughton (1593–1639), (also a Fellow of Emmanuel College, and son of the dissenting minister Thomas Stoughton whom Cudworth had replaced as minister at Coggeshall in 1606). Dr Stoughton succeeded Cudworth as Rector of Aller and attended to the education of his children. He and Mary had no children of their own before her death in 1634, but Stoughton remarried and had two daughters by his second wife, Jane Browne. Dr Stoughton was closely involved with various figures connected with the nonconformist emigrations to New England, and died in 1639.

=== Children ===
The children of Ralph Cudworth and Mary (née Machell) Cudworth (c.1582–1634) were:

- James Cudworth (1612–1682) was Assistant Governor (1656–8, 1674–80) and Deputy Governor (1681–2) of Plymouth Colony, Massachusetts, and four-times Commissioner of the United Colonies (1657–81), whose descendants form an extensive family of American Cudworths.
- Elizabeth Cudworth (1615–1654) married (1636) Josias Beacham of Broughton, Northamptonshire (Rector of Seaton, Rutland (1627–76)), by whom she had several children. Beacham was ejected from his living by the Puritans (1653), but reinstated (by 1662).
- Ralph Cudworth (1617–1688) was a Hebraist and Platonist, 11th Regius Professor of Hebrew, 26th Master of Clare Hall, and 14th Master of Christ's College, Cambridge.
- Mary Cudworth
- John Cudworth (1622–1675) of London and Bentley, Suffolk, Alderman of London, and Master of the Worshipful Company of Girdlers (1667–68). On his death, John left four orphans of whom both Thomas Cudworth (1661–1726) and Benjamin Cudworth (1670–1726) attended Christ's College, Cambridge.
- Jane/Joan(?) Cudworth (b.c.1624; fl. unmarried 1647) may have been Ralph’s sister.

== Arms ==
Coat of arms of Ralph Cudworth

Notes
The arms of the Cudworths of Werneth, Oldham, Lancashire (with a crescent for a second son).
Escutcheon
Azure, a fess Erminois between three demi-lions Or, a crescent argent for difference.
