= Edward Lewknor =

Edward Lewknor may refer to:

- Edward Lewknor (died 1556) (1516–1556), MP for Horsham
- Edward Lewknor (died 1605) (1542–1605), son of above, MP for Tamworth, New Shoreham, Maldon and Newport, Cornwall
- Edward Lewknor (died 1618) (1587–1618), son of above, MP for West Looe
