= James Cudworth (colonist) =

English colonist and Deputy Governor of Plymouth Colony (1612-82)

General James Cudworth

Deputy Governor of Plymouth Colony
- In office 1681–1682
- Monarch: Charles II
- Governor: Thomas Hinckley
- Preceded by: n/a
- Succeeded by: William Bradford the Younger

Personal details
- Born: 1612 Aller, Somerset, England
- Died: 1682 London, Middlesex, England
- Spouse: Mary Parker (m. 1635, died)
- Relations: Ralph Cudworth (father); Ralph Cudworth (brother)
- Children: James Cudworth; Mary Cudworth; Jonathan Cudworth; Israel Cudworth; Joanna Cudworth; (Male Infant) Cudworth; Jonathan Cudworth
- Occupation: Soldier; Colonist; Administrator

General James Cudworth (English: /ˈdʒeɪmz ˈkʊdɜːrθ/ CUD-erth; c.1612 – 1682) was one of the most important men in Plymouth Colony. He served as Deputy to the Plymouth General Court (1649), Commander of militia in King Philip's War (1675–8), Assistant Governor (1656–8, 1674–80) and Deputy Governor (1681–2) of Plymouth Colony, and Commissioner to the New England Confederation (four times, 1655–81).

== Family background ==
=== Rev. Ralph Cudworth (1572/3–1624) ===
James Cudworth was the eldest son of The Rev. Dr Ralph Cudworth, who was a student, then graduate and Fellow of Emmanuel College, Cambridge. In 1606, Dr Cudworth was instituted as Vicar of Coggeshall, Essex (at the presentation of Robert, 3rd Lord Rich (later 1st Earl of Warwick)), to replace Thomas Stoughton (who, having been active in the Conference of Reformed Ministers at Dedham, Essex, had been deprived by High Commission for nonconformism). Dr Cudworth resigned his Fellowship (c.1610) to accept the rectorate of Aller, Somerset, England (which was in the presentation of Emmanuel College).

At the Parish Church of St. Mary Newington, Southwark (1611), Ralph Cudworth married Mary Machell (c.1582–1634), who had been a nurse to Henry, Prince of Wales (1593/4–1612), eldest son of James I. It appears likely that Mary was a granddaughter of John Machell (d.1558), clothworker, Alderman and Sheriff of London (1555–56). A pedigree tradition, reinforced by a more recent claim, argued that she was the daughter of Mathew Machell of Shacklewell, Hackney, Middlesex (John Machell's second son by his second marriage) and his wife Mary Lewknor (who obtained a licence to marry in 1568). Mary Lewknor was one of the daughters of Edward Lewknor and his wife Dorothy Wroth (sister of the Edwardian courtier Sir Thomas Wroth (c.1518–73)). It is also contended that Mary Machell was the daughter of Mathew Machell's elder brother, John, by his second wife Ursula Hynde (daughter of Francis Hynde of Madingley Hall, Cambridge, and his wife Jane Verney). Despite extended debate, it is not absolutely certain which Machell (John or Matthew) was father of Mary, but these are the likely candidates.

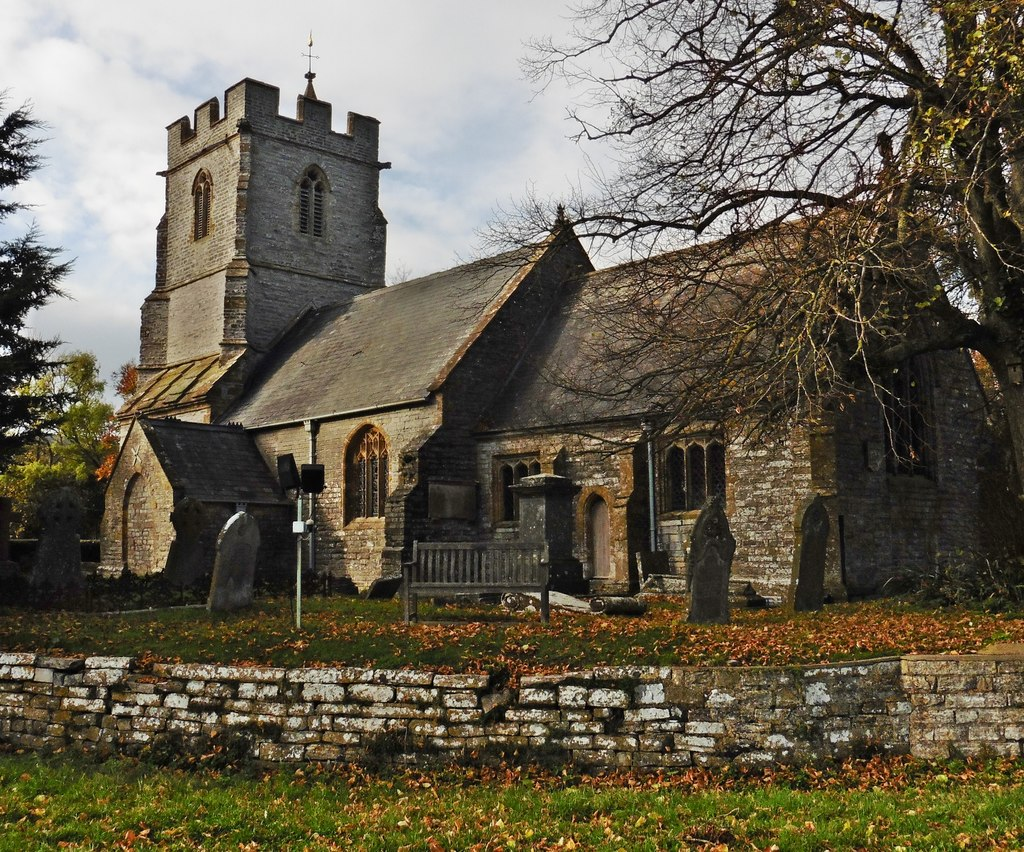
Parish Church of St Andrew, Aller, Somerset: where James Cudworth was baptised, and where his father and stepfather served, successively, as Rector (1610–24, 1624–32)

Ralph and Mary Cudworth had three sons and at least two (possibly three) daughters, before Dr Cudworth died at Aller (1624). James Cudworth was baptized there (2 August 1612), followed by Elizabeth (1615), Ralph (1617), Mary (1619) and John (1622), and probably Jane (c. 1624).

=== Rev. John Stoughton (d.1639) ===
Dr Cudworth was succeeded, as Rector, by The Rev. Dr John Stoughton (son of Thomas Stoughton of Coggeshall), who was also a student, graduate, and Fellow of Emmanuel College. Stoughton later married Ralph's widow, Mary (Machell) Cudworth (c.1582–1634). Dr Stoughton, an influential clergyman and preacher, took on the education of his stepchildren and, following the death of Mary their mother (Summer 1634), remarried to Jane Browne (daughter of John Browne of Frampton, Dorset).

John Browne was closely associated with John White of Dorchester, Dorset, Dr Stoughton, and others, in the promotion of religious emigration and colonization in New England: Dr Stoughton's brother, Thomas, sailed in the Mary and John (1630) to found Dorchester, Boston in Massachusetts Bay Colony (later becoming a freeman: 18 May 1631), and was followed (1632) by his brother, Israel Stoughton, (who was admitted freeman: November 5, 1633). Mary Machell's cousins, Sir Nathaniel Rich and his sister Margaret, Lady Wroth, wife of Sir Thomas Wroth (1584–1672) of Petherton Park, Somerset, near Aller (whose father, Richard Rich (d.1598), was the acknowledged illegitimate son and substantial legatee of Richard, 1st Lord Rich), were also highly active in the promotion of colonial enterprise in the Americas. Lady Wroth had been present at Dr Cudworth's deathbed (1624) and, at the time of her father's death (1598), their minister at Leigh, Essex (England), had been William Noyes (whose son, James Noyes, and nephew, Thomas Parker, migrated (1634) and had important roles in the settlement and ministry of Newbury, Essex County, Massachusetts Bay Colony). As a member of the Rich family, she and they were generally associated with the interests, influence and patronage of the Lords Rich (later Earls of Warwick).

Dr Stoughton was invited by John Winthrop and John Wilson to take up his ministry in New England (1632), but elected to remain in old England and accepted a preaching appointment at St Mary Aldermanbury, London. His correspondence with Sir Thomas Wroth was intercepted by government agents and was the subject of an official inquiry (in which both men escaped serious consequences). Dr Stoughton (d. 1639) and his widow, Jane Browne Stoughton (d. 1658), raised two daughters (Jane, and another who died in infancy). Jane Browne Stoughton also left a son and daughter by her first marriage (to the clergyman Walter Newburgh).

Dr Stoughton sent his younger stepson, Ralph Cudworth (1617–88), to study at Emmanuel College, Cambridge, where, by the 1650s, he had become Master of Christ's College, married Damaris Cradock Andrewes (daughter of Mathew Cradock, first Governor of the Massachusetts Bay Company), become a leading figure among the Cambridge Platonists, and was consulted by John Thurloe. James Cudworth's youngest brother, John Cudworth (1622–75) of London and Bentley, Suffolk, became an Alderman of London, and was Master of the Worshipful Company of Girdlers (1667–68).

== Career ==
=== Settlement in Scituate, Plymouth Colony, Massachusetts (1634–8) ===
Having married Mary Parker (c.1606–c.1673/81) at Northam, Devon, England (February 1, 1633/4), James and his new bride migrated to New England (1634), where they initially settled at Scituate (in Plymouth Colony, Massachusetts). In December 1634, he wrote to his stepfather (in response to a letter of exhortation received from Dr Stoughton), thanking him for the thorough religious education which he had given him. He mentioned that he had planted, successfully, a crop of corn (which yielded 60 bushels). Scituate's population amounted to 60 residents, and Cudworth's house (as the largest) was used for local religious meetings. He listed the pastors and teachers in the various settlements, noting (with approval) the arrival of John Lothropp, who landed at Boston in the Griffin (September 18, 1634) together with Anne Hutchinson and Zechariah Symmes (whom Cudworth calls "my cosson", and first went as teacher to Charlestown). James Cudworth and Timothy Hatherly (the founder of Scituate, who had emigrated in 1632) top the list of those who had prepared the way for Lothropp at Scituate, where he arrived (27 September 1634). Cudworth also reported the forthcoming marriage of Dr Stoughton's brother, Thomas, at Dorchester. The letter survives among the British State Papers and was presumably among those seized from Dr Stoughton for scrutiny soon afterwards (since certain suggestive passages are underscored).

Cudworth was admitted as a freeman of Plymouth Colony (January 1, 1634/5). Brethren of Scituate who were members of the Plymouth church had been dismissed (23 November 1634) in the expectation that they would form their own congregation and, a covenant being joined, Cudworth (and his wife) were registered as members of the Scituate church (January 18, 1634/5). John Lothropp (who, in England, had been deprived of his ministry for dissent) accepted formal appointment as their minister (January 19, 1634/5). Lothropp's record shows that "My sonn Fuller and my daughter Jane, and Edward Foster and Lettice Handford, marr[ie]d att Mr Cudworths by Captaine Standige Aprill 8 ye 4th day of the weeke 1635", which traces Cudworth's connection with Myles Standish back to the first year of his life in America. Cudworth's first children were born at Scituate: James (3 May 1635), Mary (1637), and Jonathan (1638; who died in infancy).

In October 1636, the Plymouth General Court appointed William Brewster, James Cudworth, and several other prominent citizens to a special committee which was to join with the Governor (and Assistant Governors) in reviewing all laws, with proposed changes to laws being presented at the next court meeting.

=== Removal to Barnstable, Plymouth Colony (1638–46) ===
The removal of some part of the Scituate population to a new plantation at Barnstable was advocated to the Governor, Thomas Prence (then in his second term), in two letters by John Lothropp (1638–39). The causes appear to have included a split in the Scituate congregation concerning Lothropp's views on baptism. James Cudworth and his family were among those who removed to Barnstable (taking with them their crops from Scituate). They arrived (October 11, 1639), and were listed there (1640) as amongst the first settlers. Their younger children, Israel (1641), Joanna (1643), an unbaptized male child (d.1644), and Jonathan (who survived) were born (or baptized) at Barnstable.

=== Deputy to Plymouth General Court (1649), Assistant Governor (1656–8), and Commissioner (1657) ===
Cudworth retained his interests in Scituate, and was listed (1643) for both locations as among the men "Able To Bear Arms". He was in Scituate (1646), and (as the progress of the English Civil War led to Charles I's execution (1649), the Interregnum, and the declaration of the Commonwealth of England as a Republic), Cudworth became a Deputy to Plymouth General Court (from 1649), and later Captain of the Scituate Militia (1652). During this time, the sovereignty of the English Parliament, and the authority of the puritan Oliver Cromwell, as Lord Protector (1653–8), enlarged the expectations of the puritan colonial legislature.

Both Captain James Cudworth and his friend Timothy Hatherly were appointed as supervisors of the last will and testament (7 March 1655/56) of Myles Standish (d.1656) of Duxbury, Massachusetts, and Cudworth was also a witness to this will. Standish was a Mayflower colonist of 1620, had been Plymouth Militia's first Captain (1621–56), and was a leading figure in Plymouth Colony (he died on October 3, 1656). In 1657, James Cudworth and Thomas Prence became the two Plymouth Commissioners (of eight, in all, from the four colonies) of the United Colonies of New England (or New England Confederation), (an alliance for the strengthening of the Puritan colonies and their defense against the Native Americans). Cudworth served as Assistant Governor (1656–8), during a time which saw the end of William Bradford's last term of office (June 3, 1657) and the commencement of the third and lengthy administration of Thomas Prence (1657–73).

=== Stand against persecution (1657–73) ===
In September 1657, the Commissioners issued a letter, to the authorities of Rhode Island, demanding the suppression of the Quakers; of all the Commissioners, Cudworth alone refused to sign. In December (tenth month, Old Style) 1658, he wrote a long letter (to a person in England), in which he provided details of the brutally harsh and (as he considered) illegal laws and punishments meted out to the Quakers (and others) who the Puritan monopoly in the colonial legislature wished to purge. He reported that this "Antichristian Persecuting Spirit" had been at work during the previous two years (during his magistracy), and that he had often had to object to such proceedings (though in a respectful manner). His objections had given rise to a petition against him (signed by 19 people, who complained that he had entertained Quakers at his house). This, he admitted, he had done to acquaint himself with Quaker principles (rather than to condemn them out of prejudice); and he found that he disagreed with the Quakers on various matters, and told the court, which heard the petition (presided over by Thomas Prence), that he was no Quaker: but that, just "as I was no Quaker, so I will be no Persecutor".

When the Act of Court was read before the people at Scituate (and before the Scituate Military Company (of which he was head)), there was a great disturbance against him, which he brought under control by making a speech. Consequently, a fresh petition was brought (signed by 54 hands), to which the court answered respectfully that Cudworth was a very useful and accomplished person, and that the only point against him was his association with Quakers (One or other of these petitions from "sundry persons from the towne of Scituate" was noted in the General Court (March 2, 1657/58)). In consequence of this, he and his friend Hatherly had been removed from the Bench at the previous election, and Cudworth himself was relieved of his military command (with Lt James Torrey and Ensign John Williams subsequently ordered to assume command of the company).

The persecutions to which Cudworth referred were (he stated) fuelled by the actions of the Boston legislature (then led by John Endecott). Cudworth's uncle, Israel Stoughton (d.1644), had worked with Endecott during the period of the Antinomian Controversy surrounding Anne Hutchinson, but had returned to England. Israel's son, William Stoughton (later involved in the Salem witch trials) was, during the 1650s, also resident in England. It was the voyage from England of the Speedwell in 1656 (which brought eight Quakers who were immediately imprisoned and expelled), and of the Woodhouse in 1657, and the subsequent renewal of their attempts to enter the Massachusetts Bay Colony from Rhode Island or Barbados, which now aroused the Puritan hostility. The treatment of Quakers (such as Christopher Holder, who was flogged, imprisoned, and had an ear cut-off) under Boston laws (and their law of banishment on pain of death), whipped up similar fervor elsewhere in the United Colonies in imitation: laws were emended retrospectively so that even minor actions of dissent and, of course, the Quaker refusal to take oaths were punishable by cumulative fines and imprisonments resulting in the eprivation of livelihood. Cudworth noted the strong influence of Quakerism upon the people of Sandwich, in Barnstable County.

At the time of the petitions against Cudworth (March 1657/58), the Rhode Island Assembly (upholding their principle of freedom of consciences) rebuked the United Colonies Commissioners for their demand concerning preventing the admission of Quakers, and warned that any subsequent civil troubles should be referred to "The Supream Authority of England". Cudworth's letter, written weeks after the death of Oliver Cromwell (September 3, 1658), naming the relevant members of the legislature and accusing them of arbitrary legislation outside the principles of English law, may reflect this intention. For disobedience to their laws, the Boston authorities executed: William Robinson and Marmaduke Stephenson (October 1659), Mary Dyer (1 June 1660), and William Leddra (March 1661).

In 1659, James Cudworth was sent, by Scituate, as a Deputy to the Plymouth General Court, but was not approved by the Court. Charged with disaffection to authority (on the evidence of a copy of his letter), he was ordered to appear before the Court (March 1660) on a bond of £500, and was sentenced (6 June 1660) to be disfranchised of his freedom of Plymouth Colony, having been found a "manifest opposer of the laws of government". In October 1660, he was questioned concerning a letter of reply received from John Browne of Frampton. In the light of the information which reached England, a lengthy indictment of the persecutions against Quakers in New England was published in London by George Bishop, entitled New-England Judged (1661), with a supplement describing the sufferings of the martyrs, and a full second part was published in 1667. The first volume (1661) of Bishop's work included the first publication of Cudworth's letter: it was this, therefore, which may have been influential in causing Charles II (following the Restoration of the English Monarchy (1660)), to issue "The King's Missive" (9 September 1661), which required that any Quakers held by them under sentence of death or other corporeal punishment should forthwith not be proceeded against, but should be returned (at once) to England where the charges against them might be considered according to English law.

Before this, in March 1660/61, Cudworth's elder daughter, Mary, had married the Quaker, Robert Whitcomb, and had been fined for disorderly marriage and for choosing each other without parental consent. They were, however, permitted to marry in orderly fashion (the principal objection being to Mr Henry Hobson, who had derided their authority by the counterfeit solemnization). In 1665, Cudworth's eldest son, James, also married a Quaker, Mary Howland, and they were fined for fornication (Cudworth's consent or otherwise is not noted).

=== Rehabilitation (1673), Assistant Governor (1674–80), and Deputy Governor (1681–2) ===
It was not until the death of the Governor of Plymouth Colony, Thomas Prence (March 29, 1673), and the election of his long-serving Assistant, Josiah Winslow (son of the Pilgrim Edward Winslow) as Governor, that Cudworth was officially rehabilitated. In June 1666, a majority of the Scituate militia had elected Cudworth as their commander, but this choice was nullified on account of his support for Quakers and his writing against the rulers. The Court remarked, "As to Mr. Cudworth it is directly against the advice of this court, and as to Mr. Pierce he is a stranger to us, therefore Sergeant Daman [i.e. John Damon] is directed to take command till further orders." Governor Winslow adopted a more lenient policy towards the Quakers and, among his first actions, released Cudworth and Robinson from prison (where they had been held as sympathizers). Colony records show that "Captain Cudworth, by a full and clear vote, is accepted and reestablished in the association and body of this Commonwealth." (July 4, 1673). On the same day he was appointed magistrate for Scituate, with powers to solemnize marriages, to grant subpoenas for witnesses, and to administer oaths to witnesses.

Cudworth was also chosen by the Court to lead a military expedition against the Dutch at New York (1673). However, in declining this invitation, he addressed a very thoughtful letter to Governor Winslow, objecting that his wife (then aged 67) who was in poor health would be unlikely to survive during his absence, and that he lacked the capabilities demanded by such an undertaking. He was ready to serve King and Country, but wondered why the General Court should choose him over others better qualified. He contended that the "voice of the people" was not always the "voice of God", and that he did not feel that God called him to the present task. He emphasised that he was not motivated, in his refusal, by discontent arising from any former difference: he explained that he had formerly bent his mind and thoughts to military work and other public concerns, but was discharged from them: "and therein I took vox populi to be vox Dei, and that God did thereby call and design me to sit still and be sequestered from all publick transactions, which condition suits me so well that I have received more satisfaction and contentment therein, than ever I did in sustaining any publick place."

Cudworth was chosen again as Assistant Governor (1674–80), was appointed to take charge of the Plymouth Colony military forces (1675) and, during that summer, was in charge of one-hundred Plymouth men and two-hundred Massachusetts (Bay Colony) men. In December 1675, Governor Winslow became commander-in-chief of the United Colonies forces, and planned a campaign of attacks against the Indians during King Philip's War (1675–76). Cudworth, now promoted to the rank of Major, took Winslow's place as commander of all Plymouth forces, and marched to the relief of Swansea with Major Thomas Savage (June 1675). Major Cudworth was appointed, with two others (Cornet Robert Stetson and Isaac Chittenden), by the Plymouth War Council as press masters (December 6) to obtain enough fit and able Scituate men for an expedition against the Native Americans. On December 30, the council further ordered that any person pressed into the colony's service who refused to serve would pay a fine (and if his financial reseources were insufficient, he would be sent to prison for a term not to exceed six months).

Cudworth served as Deputy Governor (1681–2), and became an official agent for Plymouth Colony. In this capacity he was charged with a mission to travel to England to obtain a new charter (by which the colony was to incorporate part of Narragansett territory). He made his last will and testament in New England (dated at Scituate, September 15, 1681), which, since it does not mention his wife, suggests that she may have died (some time after 1673). In his will, he named his sons, James, Israel, and Jonathan; his elder daughter Mary's four children (Israel, Robert, James, and Mary Whitcomb); and his younger daughter, Joanna Jones. The will also (impossibly) left two-thirds of his lands to his eldest son, James, and one-third each to Israel and Jonathan (he may have intended that two-fourths should go to the eldest and one fourth each to the others, but this is differently explained in another source).

== Death ==
James Cudworth is said to have made his journey to England, and to have died, of smallpox, in London. An inventory of his possessions (which included books worth almost £8), was compiled (June 20, 1682), and his last will and testament was proved (July 7, 1682). His burial place remains unknown (and it is possible that his body was disposed of informally owing to the nature of his illness).

== Marriage and children ==
James Cudworth married Mary Parker at Northam, Devon, England (February 1, 1633/4), and their children were:

- James Cudworth (born at Scituate, May 3, 1635 in Scituate; d. before 1697) who was fined in Court (October 1665) for fornication with the Quaker Mary Howland (d.1699), (daughter of Henry Howland and Mary Newland). They later married (1665), and had eight (or ten) children.
- Mary Cudworth (baptized at Scituate, July 23, 1637) who was fined and imprisoned "during the pleasure of the court", along with the Quaker Robert Whitcomb (son of John Whitcomb), for "disorderly conduct in coming together without consent of parents and lawful marriage" (1660/1). They later married (March 9, 1660/1), and had five children.
- Jonathan Cudworth I (baptized at Scituate, September 16, 1638; buried at Scituate, September 24, 1638).
- Israel Cudworth (baptized (unnamed) at Barnstable, April 18, 1641; d. c. 1727) who married Joanna (b. at Barnstable) and had one child: Mary Cudworth.
- Joanna Cudworth (baptized at Barnstable, March 24, 1643; d. 1718) who married ? Jones, and removed to Freetown.
- "A man child of James Cudworth, unbaptized" (buried at Barnstable, June 24, 1644).
- Jonathan Cudworth II (b. at Barnstable; d.1718) who was charged, by the Court, for fornication with Sarah Jackson (July 1670). They later married (May 31, 1671), and had eight children. He married, secondly, Elizabeth ?.

== Arms ==
Coat of arms of James Cudworth

Notes
The arms of the Cudworths of Werneth, Oldham, Lancashire (with a crescent for a second son).
Escutcheon
Azure, a fess Erminois between three demi-lions Or, with a crescent argent for difference.

== Ancestry ==
Ancestors of James Cudworth (colonist)

8. Ralph Cudworth (d.1558) of Werneth, Oldham
4. Ralph Cudworth (d.1572) of Werneth, Oldham
9. Agnes Lees
2. Ralph Cudworth (1572/3–1624)
10. Arthur Assheton (d.1591) of Clegg, Littleborough
5. Jane Assheton
1. James Cudworth
12. John Machell of London
6. Matthew Machell (c.1549–93) of London
13. Jane Loddington
3. Mary Machell (c. 1582–1634)
14. Edward Lewkenor (c.1517–56) of Kingston Buci, Sussex
7. Mary Lewkenor
15. Dorothy Wroth

Government offices
Preceded by Thomas Hinckley	Deputy Governor of Plymouth Colony; 1681–82	Succeeded by William Bradford the Younger
