= General Court =

General Court may refer to:

- General Court (European Union)
- New Hampshire General Court
- Massachusetts General Court
- Cort General de Catalunya (translated as "General Court of Catalonia"), the historic parliament of the Principality of Catalonia
- Cortes Generales, the national parliament of Spain (directly translated as "General Court(s)", though more commonly left untranslated in English-language texts)
- Cortes Gerais (pre-1911 spelling: Cortes Geraes, meaning General Courts in Portuguese), the parliament of the Kingdom of Portugal during the Constitutional Monarchy period

Institutions formerly known as General Court include:

- Vermont General Assembly, formerly the Vermont General Court
- Connecticut General Assembly, formerly the Connecticut General Court
- General Court of Virginia (colonial)
- Plymouth General Court
