= Edward Lewknor (died 1556) =

Member of the Parliament of England

Edward Lewknor (c. 1517 – 1556) was the representative of a branch of a prominent Sussex family, in an armigerous line descending in the distaff side from the Camoys barony. Having attained standing as a member of parliament and by a position of service in the royal household, his career was ended abruptly by his involvement in Henry Dudley's conspiracy against Queen Mary I, and his consequent attainder. His children were restored in blood by Queen Elizabeth I.

== Family origins ==
Edward Lewknor was the son of Edward Lewknor (died 1528) of Kingston Buci, Sussex, and his wife Margaret Copley, daughter of Roger Copley citizen and Mercer of London and of Roffey (in Horsham, Sussex – died c. 1482) by his wife Anne, a daughter and coheiress of Sir Thomas Hoo, Baron Hoo and Hastings by Eleanor, daughter of Lionel Welles. Margaret Copley's sister Eleanor was the third wife of Thomas West, 8th Baron De La Warr, who acted as feoffee for Edward's grandfather in securing the descent and uses of his estates according to the terms of his will. Edward's father had a younger half-brother Richard Lewknor and three half-sisters, whose mother Anne (died 1538), daughter of John Everard of Cratfield and sister-in-law of John Tasburgh of St Peter, South Elmham, remarried to Sir Edward Echyngham of Barsham, Suffolk (died 1527).

=== The Camoys descent ===
His grandfather, also Edward (died 1522), was the son and heir of Nicholas Lewknor of Kingston Buci (youngest son of Sir Thomas Lewknor of Horsted Keynes by Elizabeth Echyngham, stepmother of Baron Hoo and Hastings) and his wife Elizabeth (Isabella) Radmylde. Elizabeth and her sister Margaret Radmylde became the coheirs of their nephew William Radmylde, who died without issue. Their mother Margaret Camoys (born c. 1402), first wife of Ralph Radmylde, was granddaughter of Thomas de Camoys, 1st Baron Camoys (died 1421), and (with her sister Eleanor) coheir to her brother Hugh Camoys, 2nd Lord Camoys. Eleanor married Sir Roger Lewknor of Broadhurst, elder half-brother of Nicholas Lewknor. Hugh died in 1426, when the title went into abeyance until 1839. It was then resurrected in Thomas Stonor, 3rd Baron Camoys, descendant and heir of Elizabeth Radmylde's sister Margaret, who married John Goring.

=== Lewknor descent and kin ===
His great-grandfather Nicholas Lewknor of Kingston-by-sea otherwise Kingston Bowcy was the brother of Sir Roger Lewknor of Broadhurst and Horsted Keynes in Sussex. Sir Roger Lewknor and the heiress Alianora de Camoys were the great-grandparents of Jane Lewknor, Sir Richard Lewknor and Thomas Lewknor. The daughter of Sir Roger Lewknor and Alianora, Elizabeth, married John Wroth, and were the grandparents of Robert Wroth and the great-grandparents of Robert Wroth's children Sir Thomas Wroth and Dorothy Wroth.

== Early life ==
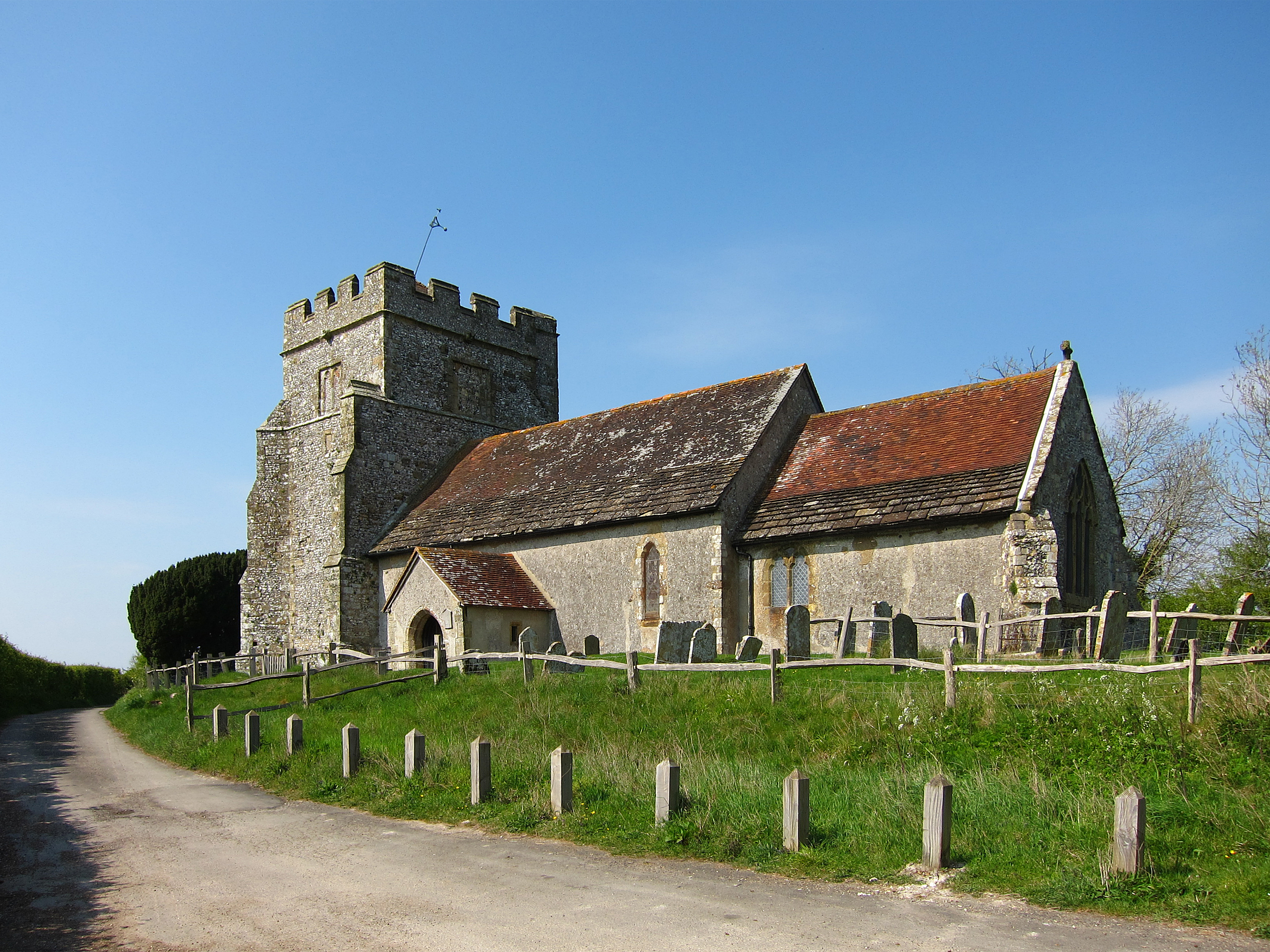
St Peter's church, Hamsey, Sussex

Lewknor had a younger brother Anthony and sisters Eleanor, Mary and Barbara. According to an Inquisition upon his father's death, Edward was then 11 years old. His father's will, however, left estates including Hamsey (East Sussex) in feoffment to mature for him in October 1542. Other estates including Kingston Buci were allocated to Anthony, and were in the administration of the widow and three other executors, and with the assistance of Sir Roger Copley, during minority. Margaret Lewknor assumed sole responsibility as executor but Edward came into the wardship of one of the co-executors, Robert Wroth of Durrants, Enfield (Middlesex), and of Gray's Inn (from 1531 attorney of the Duchy of Lancaster and M.P. for Middlesex 1529–1535), a descendant of Sir Roger Lewknor and Alianora Camoys.

Robert Wroth's eldest son Thomas Wroth was of a very similar age to Edward Lewknor. The Wroth household was of Protestant sympathy: Robert Wroth became a friend of Thomas Cromwell's, and from 1534 until his death two years later Wroth shared with Cromwell the stewardship of Westminster Abbey. Thomas was sent to St John's College, Cambridge, but did not take a degree. At his father's death in 1536 he became a ward of the Crown, and in that year he entered Gray's Inn. It is claimed (but does not appear) that Lewknor was admitted in the same year. Cromwell at once obtained a grant of the marriage and wardship of Thomas Wroth, and in 1538 sold the marriage to Sir Richard Rich, who arranged that Thomas should marry his daughter Mary Rich.

== Marriage ==
The wardship and marriage of Edward were granted to his mother in May 1533. However Robert Wroth in his will written in 1535 explicitly required that his ward Edward Lewknor should marry his daughter Dorothy: if either were to refuse or mislike the match, Dorothy was to have the financial benefit arising from the dissolution of the wardship. Edward and Dorothy were accordingly married. Dorothy's mother Jane was the daughter of Sir Thomas Hawte (a Woodville descendant), who had died in 1505, and his wife Isabel (Elizabeth) Frowyk, sister of Sir Thomas Frowyk. The union reinforced existing ties of kinship among the numerous posterity of Sir Thomas Lewknor, and reinvested two Camoys lines. The manor of Kingston Buci was in 1537 settled upon Margaret Lewknor for life with an additional twenty years' tenure with remainder in tail male to Anthony Lewknor. Anthony was admitted to Gray's Inn in 1542.

Margaret Lewknor lived until at least 1551, and was no doubt instrumental in arranging the marriages of Edward's sisters. Eleanor became the wife of Giles Sentbarbe, Rector of Hamsey c. 1541–1555. Mary married John Michell the younger of Stammerham (in Horsham), a resident of Horsham, whose parliamentary connections may have assisted Lewknor's own ambitions. Lewknor's sister Barbara married Sir John Dawtrey.

== Progress ==
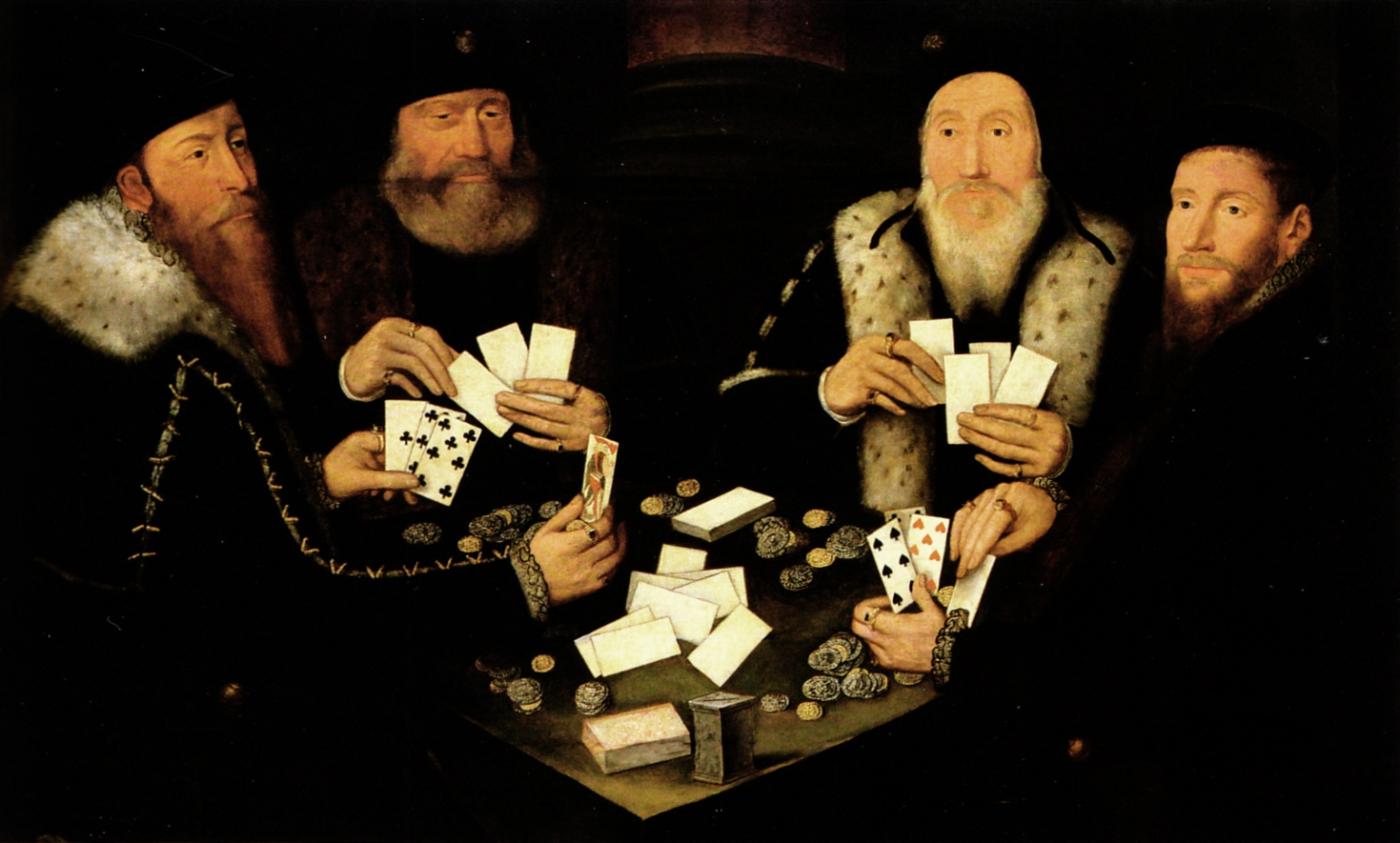
Four Gentlemen of High Rank Playing Primero (16th century).

The marital existence of Edward and Dorothy Lewknor was fruitful, producing ten children, of whom the eldest of the four sons, Edward, was born c. 1541–42. It is inferred that the elder Edward entered the service of the Duke of Norfolk. He is suspected to be the Lewkenor, one of the Duke's gentlemen, who in December 1545 came to blows with Thomas Hussey of Caythorpe, M.P., treasurer to the Duke, while gambling at cards 'at Domyngo's house' in a game of primero. The affray occurred at Tothill Fields behind the old Palace of Westminster: Hussey was reprimanded by the Privy Council, since parliament was sitting at the time, and he (and perhaps also Lewknor) ought to have been there. Both men were briefly committed to the Fleet prison.

Henry Machyn stated Edward Lewkenor to have been Groom Porter to King Edward VI, a fact lacking positive confirmation from other sources. (This office included responsibility for royal games at cards). Thomas Wroth, who was knighted in 1547, was successively Gentleman Usher to the Prince's Chamber (1541–1547), Gentleman of the Privy Chamber (1547–49) and a principal Gentleman (1549–53) to the King: he was also Knight of the Shire for Middlesex in the parliaments of 1547, 1549 and March 1553. Lewknor is likely to have gained his position in the royal household through his brother-in-law's connections and the influence of Richard Rich.

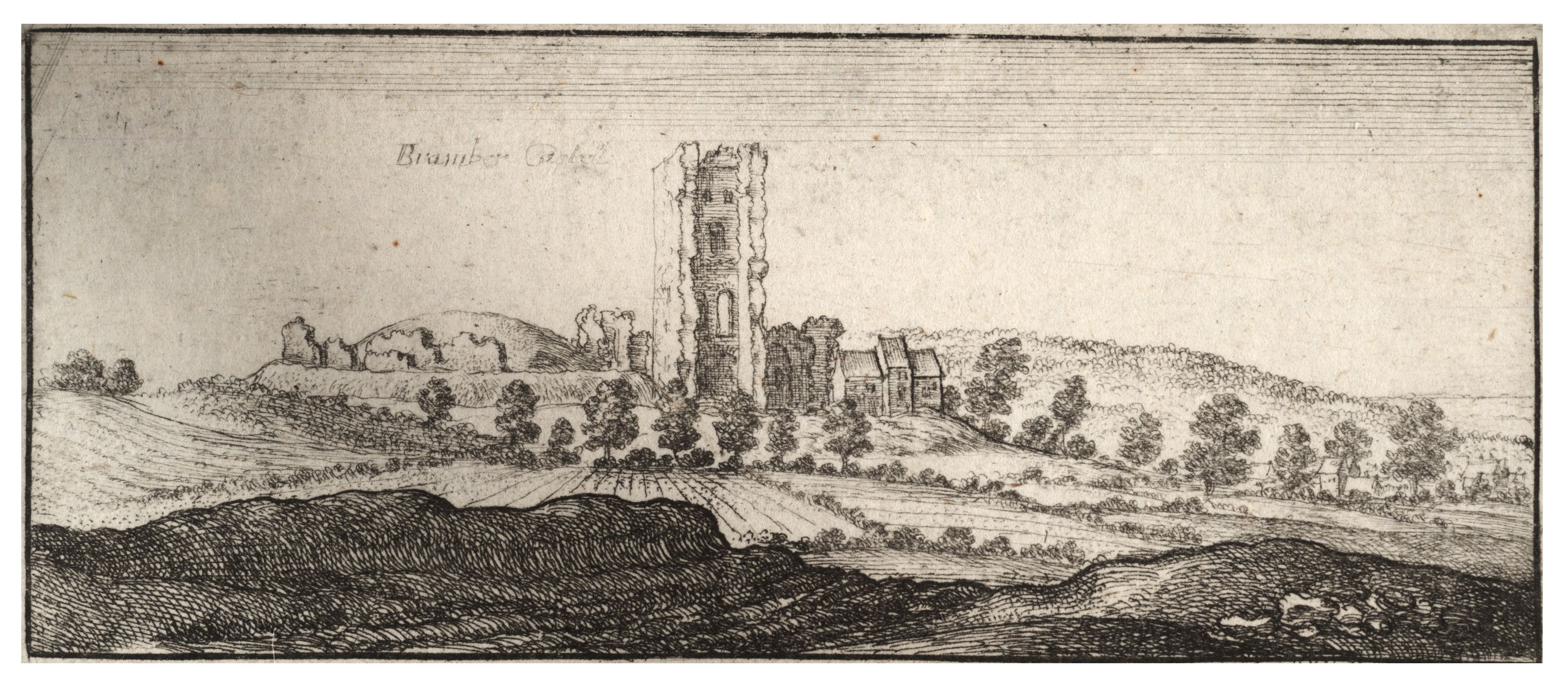
Bramber Castle seen by Wenceslas Hollar (1607–1677)

In 1548 Margaret Lewknor was the demesne lessee of the manor of High Barns at Upper Beeding, Sussex, a property seized by the Crown from the attainted Duke of Norfolk, which had been granted to Thomas Seymour in 1547. Following Seymour's attainder in 1549, on 21 May 1553 it, together with the site of the former Bramber Castle and the disparked lands called Le Newe Park at Upper Beeding were granted in chief by the King to Edward Lewknor, King's Servant, Esquire, for the fortieth part of a knight's fee and in consideration of £718.8s.8d paid to Sir Edmund Peckham on behalf of the King. Lewknor was also granted the house of the former Butler Chantry cantarista in Horsham, and several tenements appertaining to it, in free socage. The acquisition of the site at Bramber was no doubt a visible assertion or impropriation of Lewknor's perceived de Braose ancestry or forebears.

Lewknor was elected a Member for Horsham to the Parliament of March 1553, jointly with the younger Henry Hussey of Slinfold. John Michell of Stammerham had been in tenure of High Barns in 1548, and was so still in May 1553, when Lewknor granted to him and his heirs the lands called New Park in Beeding. The accession of Queen Mary followed on 6 July. Thomas Wroth, a signatory to the Letters supporting Jane Gray's succession, attended the King's deathbed and assisted in the proclamation of Mary, but was briefly imprisoned: soon afterwards he escaped to Italy, expecting worse consequences, and did not return to England until 1558. Lewknor remained a royal servant (by Machyn's account, groom porter), and received a commission for the peace, but he did not remain in Parliament. John Michell succeeded to his seat for Horsham in October 1553, but within the next year the Duke of Norfolk, being rehabilitated, challenged Michell's title to the New Park. Neither Michell nor Lewknor is known to have sat in Parliament again.

== Treason ==
Lewknor was not overtly implicated in Wyatt's rebellion of 1554 (incited by Mary's decision to marry King Philip II of Spain): he was lent a corslet from the Tower armoury to oppose it. However, as Dorothy Lewknor was cousin-german to Jane Hawte, Wyatt's wife, there was room for suspicion. It was in the aftermath of the executions of Wyatt and of Jane Gray and Guilford Dudley, and in the context of the Marian persecutions, that Lewknor allowed his position within the royal household to be exploited as part of a more widespread resistance. With a group of sympathetic gentlemen, Henry Dudley planned to raise an army of Englishmen exiled in Europe, and with assistance from the King of France to land in England and rally enough support to depose the Queen and instal Elizabeth as monarch. France however made a truce with Mary, so to fund the project an attempt was made to steal £50,000 in Spanish silver from the Queen's exchequer. In the process, on 18 March 1555/6 the plot was revealed, and several involved were imprisoned in the Tower, racked for confessions and executed between April and July 1556. Dudley however escaped abroad.

Henry Peckham, son of Sir Edmund Peckham (Receiver-general of the Exchequer), on 1 February 1555/6 disclosed the plot to Edward Lewknor and his cousin William West, (heir to the 9th Baron De La Warr but then unable to inherit his title). Prompted by Sir Anthony Kingston, a fellow conspirator, Peckham asked them to obtain a copy of the Will of King Henry VIII, by which they hoped to disprove Mary's title to the throne. Lewknor was said to have met with sympathisers in Sussex and London, and to have heard loose talk about an attack on the Queen over a game of cards. He procured a copy of the Will and sent it to West's house within a fortnight, where it was given to Peckham. Both were implicated by Peckham's confession. Lewknor (now positively identified as the Groom Porter) was committed to the Tower of London on 6 June, arraigned at the Guildhall on 15 June together with Francis Verney, convicted of treason and condemned to death. West was arraigned on 30 June and in an attainder by verdict was also convicted and condemned, but later received a pardon.

Lewknor was returned to the Tower, but his sentence was deferred. In his confinement Dorothy and one of his daughters were permitted to live with him in his quarters for several weeks. On 7 June Mary had given orders to William Paget for the leading exiles (Sir Thomas Wroth heading the list of nine names) to be summoned immediately to England, "all excuses, delayes, lettes, hindrances and other occasions happening to you whatsoever utterly sett ap[ar]te", to appear before the King and Queen and privy council on the last day of October to answer such matters as may be objected against them, not failing upon their faith or allegiance. During August 1556 Thomas Wroth, then living in Strasbourg, evaded receiving delivery of the summons and instead obtained a permit to become fully resident there. Lewknor, who may have hoped for a pardon, sent a message to the Queen praying forgiveness and grace for his wife and children. Frances Malet, priest to Sir Henry Bedingfeld (Lieutenant of the Tower of London), took a letter to the Queen about Lewknor, but could not obtain a positive reply. On Sunday 6 September he died without receiving the final Sacrament. He was buried in the Tower precincts on the following day.

== Aftermath ==
Lewknor's plea did not go altogether unheard. At his widow's petition, on 27 February following the Queen restored to her the manor and advowson of Hamsey, together with many lands in Hamsey and Woham (i.e. Offham), which had been forfeit to the crown on account of the attainder. Also the term of years in the manor of Kingston Buci, which had been held for life by Margaret Lewknor since 1538, but had before the time of his attainder reverted to him by his mother's death, was (with the exception of the advowson, fines, heriots, and lands in Henfield) now assigned to Dorothy for a payment of £200, together with all his goods and chattels. The manor was accordingly rated for 'Dorathe Lewkenor' on 12 July 1558 by the Commission for lands sold during that year.

Following the death of Mary in November 1558 and the accession of Elizabeth I, a new parliament was called on 23 January 1558/9. Among its first actions was the passage of a bill to restore Lewknor's children in blood, lineage and degree, reversing the effect of his attainder. The petition of Edward, Thomas, Stephen and William, and of Jane, Mary, Elizabeth, Anne, Dorothie and Lucrecie, 'sonnes and daughters to Edward Lewknor, late of Kyngeston Bowsey in the Countie of Sussex, Esquire,' addressed to Elizabeth that their father 'in the tyme of your heighnes syster, the Quenes ma[jes]tie that dead is, was attaynted of heighe treason...' It was read in the House of Commons on 3, 10 and 15 March, when it was passed by them, and, being taken to the Upper House on 20 March, it received all three readings on the following day, all these being recorded in the Journal of Sir Simonds D'Ewes.

In 1588 Dorothy Lewknor, widow of Edward Lewknor, subscribed to the loan raised by Queen Elizabeth at the time of the expected invasion by the Spanish Armada. She made her will as of Kingston Buci on 1 October 1587, making her son Edward her executor, and granting to her son Thomas her moiety of lands and tenements in Old Shoreham, and her term remaining in the manor of King's Barns. She refers to an indenture or recognizance made between herself and her 'very good cosens and frends' Sir Francis Walsingham and Sir Henry Cocke in 1570. She was generous in remembering the children of her brothers William and Oliver Wroth, and all her own grandchildren, including particularly her godchildren Dorothy Machell (daughter of Mathew and Mary) and Dorothy Lewkenor (daughter of Edward), and godson Thomas Pellett (son of Benjamin and Dorothy). Her will was proved in August 1589.

== Children ==
The children of Edward Lewknor and Dorothy Wroth are shown as follows:

- (Sir) Edward Lewknor (c.1542–1605), of Denham Hall, West Suffolk, married Susan, daughter and coheir of Sir Thomas Heigham, of Higham, West Suffolk, and his wife Martha, daughter of Sir Thomas Jermyn of Rushbrooke Hall. They had two sons and seven daughters.
- Thomas Lewknor (died 1598 or 1599), of Court and Buckinghams, Old Shoreham, married Judith Bulman, daughter of Thomas Bulman and wife Elizabeth, son of Arthur Bulman of Sussex. Judith was the sister of Joan Bulman, who married Thomas Wroth of Blenden Hall, Bexley, Kent, a son of Dorothy Lewknor's brother Sir Thomas Wroth, and father of Sir Thomas Wroth of Petherton Park. She had three other sisters. Judith remarried to Anselm Fowler.
- Stephen Lewknor, living 1559, died without issue.
- William Lewknor, living 1559, died without issue.
- Jane Lewknor, married (1) William Larke, Esq. [will proved 1582], and (2) John Pascall, Esq., of Much Baddow, Essex (son of John Pascall and Mary Kebyll?). (issue)
- Mary Lewknor (at marriage, of Broxbourne, Hertfordshire), married by licence dated 1 July 1568 to Mathew Machell (c.1547–1593) of Shacklewell in Hackney, Middlesex, son of John Machell (Clothworker), Alderman and Sheriff of London (died 1558) and his second wife Joan Luddington, daughter of Henry Luddington, citizen and Grocer (died 1531), and step-daughter of Sir William Laxton. They had one son, John Machell, gentleman of Hackney, Wendover and Wonersh (1580–1647) (who married first, 1599, Jane Woodroffe and secondly, c. 1624, Lady Elizabeth Aungier), and at least three daughters, Dorothy (died 1593), Jane (wife of Henry Welch of Wendover), and Elizabeth (wife of John Cave). Two other daughters, Ann (wife of _____ Gibbs), and Mary (died c. 1635) (married first, 1611, the Revd. Ralph Cudworth (d. 1624), and secondly, c. 1624, the Revd. John Stoughton: mother of Ralph Cudworth and James Cudworth), are also attributed.
- Elizabeth Lewknor, living 1559.
- Anne Lewknor, living 1559.
- Dorothy Lewknor (died before 1590), married (as his 1st wife) (Sir) Benjamin Pellatt, Knt., of Steyning (Upper Beeding) and Bolney, Sussex. They had (at least) three sons and one daughter.
- Lucrecie (or Lewcreys) Lewknor (living 1587), married William Jackson of London.
