= Thomas Wroth (died 1672) =

English gentleman-poet and politician

Sir Thomas Wroth
- Born: 1584; London
- Died: 11 July 1672 (aged 87–88); Petherton Park
- Spouse: Margaret Rich
- Parent(s): Thomas Wroth; Joanna Bulman

Sir Thomas Wroth (1584 – 11 July 1672) was an English gentleman-poet and politician who sat in the House of Commons at various times between 1628 and 1660. Active in colonial enterprises in North America, he became a strong republican in the Rump Parliament but stopped short of regicide.

== Origins and education ==
Thomas Wroth was born in London, the eldest son of Thomas Wroth (died 1610) of the Inner Temple and of Blendon Hall, Bexley, Kent and his wife Joanna Bulman, daughter of Thomas Bulman of London. The parents were married at St. Stephen Coleman Street on 23 December 1577 and Thomas was christened there on 5 May 1584. A grandson of Sir Thomas Wroth (1516–1573) and Mary Rich, daughter of Richard, Lord Rich, Thomas was cousin-German to Sir Robert Wroth of Loughton, Essex (1575–1614), who in 1604 married Mary Sidney (Lady Wroth), daughter of Robert Sidney, Baron Sidney of Penshurst, afterwards Lord Viscount Lisle and 1st Earl of Leicester. His father was cousin to Robert Rich, 3rd Baron Rich (1559–1619), who was created 1st Earl of Warwick in 1618.

Thomas matriculated as a commoner at Gloucester Hall, University of Oxford, on 1 July 1600, but was later associated with Broadgates Hall. He left the university without a degree. He was "in good esteem among some persons for his poetry, for his encouragement of poets, and for his love to learning and learned men." His contemporary, the poet Richard Niccols (who entered Magdalen College, Oxford in 1602, and took his B.A. at Magdalen Hall, Oxford in 1606), dedicated his juvenile work 'The Cuckow' to 'his worshipful good friend Master Thomas Wroth, an affecter and favourer of the Muses' in 1607, addressing him as 'dear friend' and 'Patron', and promising better thereafter:

When as my wit with riper fruit shall grow
My muse may speak to thee in sweeter ryme
And for thy worth some graver poem show.

In November 1606 Thomas was entered with his brother Peter Wroth as a student at the Inner Temple.

== Inheritance, marriage and poetry ==
Thomas Wroth was knighted at Theobalds on 14 October 1613, and, having inherited a considerable portion of his father's wealth, he purchased the Somerset estates of his cousin Sir Robert Wroth when they were sold for the payment of debts. The chief of these were the manors of Newton and Petherton Park, of which his great-grandfather Robert had been appointed Forester by Henry VII, and which his grandfather Sir Thomas had purchased from Edward VI in 1550. Petherton Park became the seat of his branch of the family, and for the rest of his life Wroth was associated with Somerset politics, while conducting his London affairs from Coleman Street.

In c. 1614 Wroth married his widowed cousin Margaret Rich (c. 1580–1635), to whom he became very devoted. She was a daughter of Richard Rich (d. 1598) (acknowledged son of Chancellor Rich) and his wife Jane Machell. In 1598 Margaret and her brother Nathaniel were with their mother at their father's deathbed at Leigh, Essex, attended by William Noyes, then 'minister of this place'. Margaret was first married to Paul Bowdler, citizen and Draper of London (d. 1610), two of whose sisters, Judith and Anne, were the wives of Sir William Calley of Burderop, Chiseldon, Wiltshire, and Sir John Gore of London, respectively. Her daughter Anne Bowdler, who died in her maidenhood in 1629, came of this marriage.

Wroth composed and published The Husband: a poem expressed in a Compleat Man at the time of his marriage: Richard Niccols included an epigram (no. 29) to Dame Margaret, in fourteen lines of rhymed couplets, in his small 1614 collection Vertue's Encomium: 'Margarite', the gem, the pearl and the daisy, is extolled with play on the words 'rich' and 'worth'. Over the next five years Wroth prepared his rhymed English translation of Book 2 of Virgil's Aeneid (with parallel Latin text), as The Destruction of Troy. This was published, with 100 epigrams of his own Abortive of an Idle Hour, in 1620. It was dedicated to Robert Sidney, Lord Viscount Lisle, father of Lady Mary Wroth. Sidney had some part in the poem's genesis, and the epigrams include one (no. 26) dedicated to Captain Nathaniel Butler, Governor of Bermuda. Wroth's Destruction of Troy, in which he resolved into prophecy the words of Creusa's apparition, may be read as a Virginian text for the colonial culture carrying its religion to a new western land, its prophetic mission under the direction of providence.

== Company interests and entry to parliament ==
A marriage of Rich and Wroth families reinforced their interconnected histories of Protestant sympathy and Puritan patronage. Wroth had been a subscriber to the Virginia Company in 1609. His brother-in-law, Margaret's brother, was the colonial pioneer Sir Nathaniel Rich, and like Robert Sidney a most active figure in the Virginia Company. Wroth fully associated himself with them in colonial enterprise. In 1620 he became a member of the Company of the Somers Isles (Bermuda Company), and on 3 November 1620 joined the Plymouth Council for New England, being named in the New England Charter. He became a member of the Virginia Company in 1621, and from 1621 to 1624 was particularly associated with Nathaniel Rich and Robert Sidney in the Warwick party of the company, when they came into opposition to Sir Edwin Sandys. He voted in favour of the surrender of the original charter in October 1623, and was one of those included in James I's new grant of 15 July 1624. He was also a member of the Eastland Company. Wroth was a J.P. for Somerset from 1624 to 1625. In domestic politics he joined the opposition to King Charles I: in 1628 he was elected Member of Parliament for Bridgwater and sat until 1629, when Charles began to rule without parliament for eleven years.

== Suspicion, loss and aspiration ==
In September 1635 the government seized a letter which he had written to Dr. John Stoughton in which he lamented the condition of the church and hinted at resistance unto blood. A month later Dame Margaret died of a sudden fever at Petherton. She made a will providing for the education of her niece Frances Grimsditch, her sister Jane's daughter, who was in waiting in the Wroth household. Frances's brother Thomas was then in Providence Island colony. She also established a charity of sermons and gifts to the poor of St. Stephen Coleman Street, where she desired to be buried near to her daughter and the parents of Sir Thomas. John Goodwin was minister there.

Wroth wrote a prose Declaracion of the life sicknes and death of his dearest and most beloved wife dedicated to Sir Nathaniel Rich, and in the four-days' progress to London for her funeral at Coleman Street he composed a poetic Encomium for her in thirty-one stanzas, which he afterwards published. "To summe up all, this Woman, this my Wife, She was the Honour, Comfort of my Life," he lamented: he never remarried.

Margaret's sister Elizabeth, widow of Sir John Morgan of Chilworth near Wonersh, Surrey (died 1621), and of the judge John Sotherton (died 1631), had died in 1632. Nathaniel Rich died in 1636 making bequests for the families of his sisters Jane Grimsditch (of Haslemere, Surrey) and Anne Browne to emigrate to the Bermudas. (Frances Grimsditch married Richard Hunt, emigrated and inherited.) Even then, Nathaniel's cousin James Cudworth of Scituate (Dr. Stoughton's stepson), who had emigrated to Plymouth Colony two years previously, was, as a prominent citizen, being deputed by the Plymouth General Court to make a general revision of all its laws: Dame Margaret had attended his father's deathbed.

== Career ==
Wroth felt the loss as a judgement upon his own insufficiency, and the official repercussions of his letter to Stoughton hardened his resolve. He became Recorder of Bridgwater by 1636 and was a J.P again from 1636 to 1640. He served as Sheriff of Somerset from 1639 to 1640, and was therefore excluded from the Short Parliament. Margaret's nephew Nathaniel Rich, junr. (son of Robert Rich of Felsted, but his education supervised by his uncle Nathaniel) became an active figure in the New Model Army. In February 1642 Wroth delivered to Parliament a Petition on behalf of the people of Somerset for the removal of the Lords and Bishops responsible for the breach of privileges of Parliament, which was published together with his speech on the occasion. The petition declared,

"We being struken with the sence and horror of so desperate a mischiefe, do hold it high time to declare the sincere and ardent Affection of our hearts, which we are ready to seale with our purest blood, in defence of our Religion, his Sacred Majesty, our deare Country; and that which is the life of our Liberty, the Rights and Priviledges of Parliament."

His brother Sir Peter Wroth, whose son was a royalist and fought at the battle of Newbury in 1643, died in 1645 making Sir Thomas his sole executor. In February 1646 Wroth was elected MP for Bridgwater as a recruiter to the Long Parliament. Two years later he presented to the library of Syon House a copy of the Koran, and other Arabic and Turkish manuscripts. On 3 January 1648, seconding Henry Marten's resolution, he moved that Charles I should be confined under guard in a secure castle, that Articles of Impeachment should be drawn up against him, and that they should lay him aside and settle the kingdom without him:

"I care not what form of government you set up, so it be not by Kings and devils."

Clement Walker called him 'Jack-Pudding to Prideaux the Post-master'. He took the 'engagement' in 1649, and was one of the judges appointed to try the king, but he attended only one session. In June following he was thanked by parliament for suppressing the Levellers in Somerset. On 25 June 1653 he was made a commissioner for the government of the Bermudas and did not sit in the Barebones Parliament in 1653 or the First Protectorate Parliament of 1654. The North Petherton parish registers show that Sir Thomas conducted numerous marriage ceremonies there between 1654 and 1657. On 20 October 1656 he was again returned as MP for Bridgwater in the Second Protectorate Parliament. He was re-elected in January 1658/9 for the Third Protectorate Parliament. In February 1658/9 he and Sir Henry Vane spoke warningly to suggestions that the Protector should occupy the role of a King:

'If we find kings destructive to the nation, we may lay them aside. It is a formidable thing, to speak of a King'

and with regard to the reinstatement of Lords:

'Men are born to be subjects and not to be slaves. Either let us be slaves or freemen. The English are easy to be governed, and they love it; but it must be as freemen and not as slaves.'

He opposed the hereditary principle:

'I am against hereditary lordship, for the reason why his Highness refused king; because he knew not what he that came after him should be, a wise man or a fool. I see plainly here is a great inclination to come round again. It is to bring in old Lords by degrees, and then, consequently, one whom I hope my eyes shall never live to see here.'

In 1660 he was elected for Bridgwater again in the Convention parliament.

At the Restoration Wroth's petition for pardon was granted, but he was removed from the commission of the peace and was deprived of the Recordership in 1662. He lived in retirement until his death, aged 88, at Petherton Park on 11 July 1672. His will was proved on 24 August following.

== Family ==
Sir Thomas Wroth and Dame Margaret had no issue together.

His estates passed to the descendants of his brother Sir Peter Wroth and Dame Margaret (née Dering). Sir Peter's son Sir John Wroth, the royalist, was created baronet in 1660. Sir John died in 1664 (i.e. before Sir Thomas), and therefore it was John's son Sir John Wroth, 2nd baronet (died 1674), who received the inheritance. Petherton Park was in the possession of a later Sir Thomas Wroth when the Alfred Jewel was discovered there in 1693.

Parliament of England
Preceded by Sir Arthur Lake; Edward Popham	Member of Parliament for Bridgwater; 1628–1629; With: Thomas Smith	Parliament suspended until 1640
Vacant Seats vacant since 1644	Member of Parliament for Bridgwater; 1646–1653; With: Robert Blake	Unrepresented in the Barebones Parliament
Preceded by Robert Blake	Member of Parliament for Bridgwater; 1656–1660; With: John Wroth 1659; Francis Rolle 1660	Succeeded by Edmund Wyndham; John Tynte
