= John Stoughton (priest) =

English clergyman (c. 1593–1639)

John Stoughton (1593?–1639) was an English clergyman, of influential millennial views. He was the stepfather and preceptor in their youth of Ralph Cudworth and James Cudworth.

== Origin and religious background ==
=== Thomas Stoughton, father of John ===
Coat of Arms of Thomas Stoughton

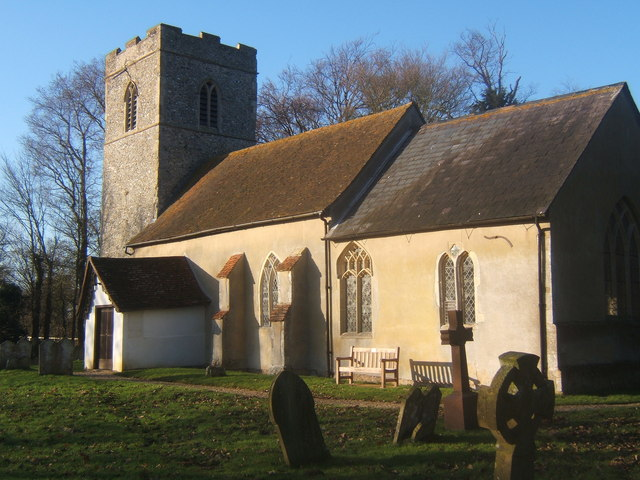
St Mary's church, Naughton, where Thomas Stoughton was rector and his son John was baptized in 1593

John Stoughton, baptized at Naughton, Suffolk in 1593, was one of the three sons of the clergyman Thomas Stoughton (died 1622), and his wife, Katherine. Thomas Stoughton, the father, was born an only child in Sandwich, Kent. The University career suggested for him in the Alumni Cantabrigienses is shown by a detailed study to be a confusion with another person. He became Rector of Naughton from 1586 to 1594, when he was deprived by Archbishop Whitgift. During this time his first children, including John and Thomas, were born.

Involved with the Conference of reformed ministers at Dedham, Essex, his disputation with Andrew Oxenbridge was on the point of justification by faith alone (sola fide). He served as assistant minister at Great Burstead, Essex before being presented by Baron Rich of Leez to the Vicarage of Coggeshall, Essex in 1600. By 1603, when his wife Katherine died, she had borne him twelve children, of whom a further son Israel and four daughters also reached adulthood. As one not conforming to the Anglican formulae he was deprived by High Commission of his living in 1606: Ralph Cudworth, of Emmanuel College, Cambridge, was instituted Perpetual Vicar in his place at the presentation of Baron Rich, and held it for two years. After some time at Great Totham Stoughton returned to Kent (by 1615) and died there in 1622.

=== Works ===
Thomas Stoughton published four principal works:

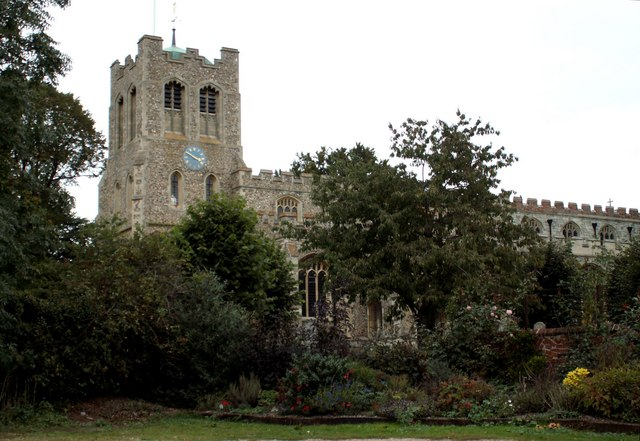
St Peter-ad-Vincula, Coggeshall, where Thomas Stoughton was vicar from 1600 until deprived in 1606

- A Generall Treatise against Poperie (1598)
- The Dignitie of God's Children (1610)
- Two profitable treatises (1616)
- The Christians sacrifice (1622)

The Generall Treatise against Poperie was dedicated to Robert, Lord Rich, with a letter to his readers including friends in Kent, London, Essex and Suffolk. The Two Profitable Treatises were dedicated to the Mayor and Jurats of Sandwich, were published in London in 1616, and were dated by Stoughton from St Bartholomew's Hospital in Sandwich. The Christians Sacrifice (dedicated to Robert (2nd) Earl of Warwick, and Baron of Leez, and to his son Robert, Lord Rich) contains "The Authors Postscript to his children as it were his last will and testament unto them", dated 22 August 1622. He states he has lived to twice his father's age, and twelve years more. Having seven children then living, he declares he has nothing to leave them but his precepts. "Let none of you be grieved that I have left you nothing of my inheritance in Kent, neither of my lands since, that I purchased in Suffolke, as also in Essex, all being now gone, and the price thereof spent: not riotously or otherwise lewdly, but by other meanes."

== Life ==
=== University ===
John Stoughton reached university age while his father was still in East Anglia, and entered Emmanuel College, Cambridge in 1607, where he was tutored by William Sancroft the elder, uncle of Archbishop Sancroft. Graduating B.A. in 1611 and M.A. in 1614, he was elected a Fellow of the college in 1616. His ordination as priest is probably that recorded in December 1617, performed by Samuel Harsnett: he took the degree of Bachelor of Divinity in 1621. In the following year his father died, but by this time John was well-established in his university position. In 1623, when the Master of Emmanuel, John Preston (admitted 1622), sought confirmation of a college statute concerning the requirements for his residency, John Stoughton's signature headed the list of Fellows' names who certified their formal response in two separate orders.

He was considered a preacher of unusual eloquence. Two notable sermons given by him in 1624, reflecting political circumstances of the time, concern the theme of marriage. Early in 1623/24 he preached at Paul's Cross in London The Love-Sick Spouse, on a text of lament from the Canticles interpreted to signify the separation of Christ from His true Church. The Song of Solomon was a rich source for contemporary theological exegesis directed against the threat to protestantism posed by royal marital alliance with Roman Catholic Spain or France. Stoughton quoted many classical and patristic sources in his exposition. About ten months later, in The Happinesse of Peace preached during a royal visitation to Cambridge, he spoke to like point before a courtly audience which cannot have missed his meaning.

=== Aller, Somerset ===
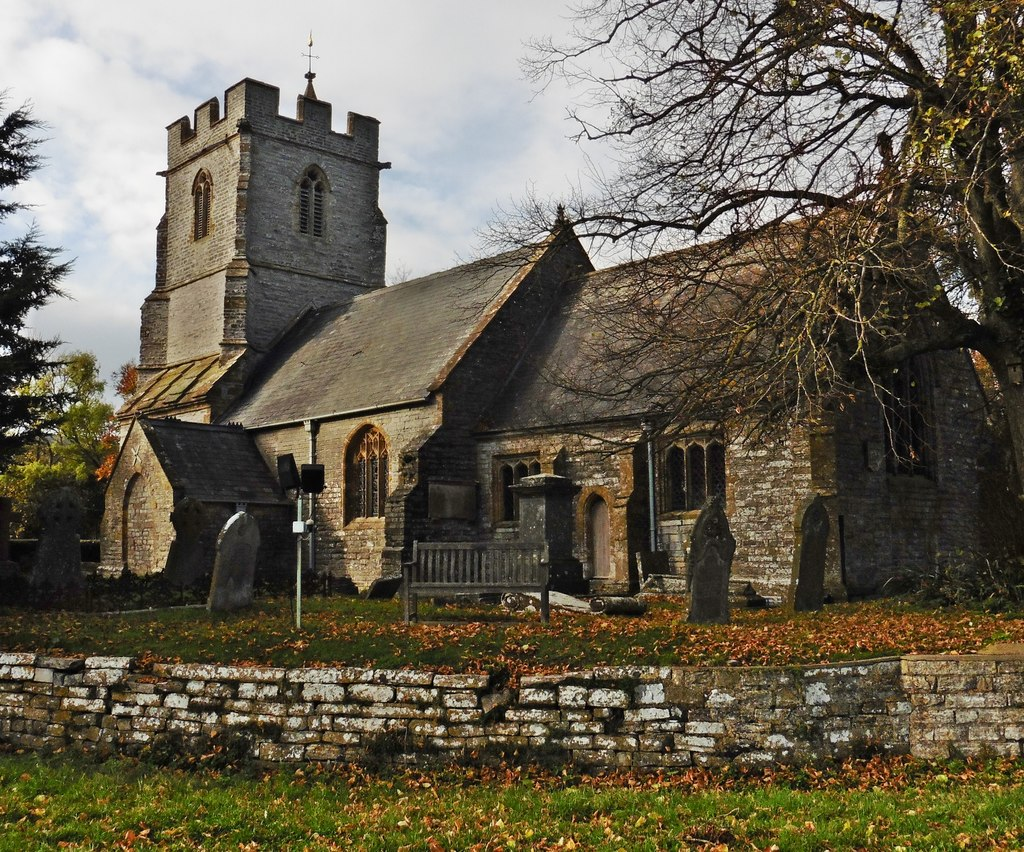
St Andrew's church, Aller, where John Stoughton succeeded Dr Cudworth in 1624

In 1624 the College living of Aller, in Somerset, became vacant by the death of Dr. Ralph Cudworth, who had resigned his own fellowship to marry and settle in the Rectory there in 1610. John Stoughton succeeded him as Rector in 1624 and married his widow Mary (née Machell). Here he developed connections with Sir Thomas and Dame Margaret Wroth of Petherton Park, who were highly active in colonial enterprises in North America. Dame Margaret, cousin of Robert Rich and sister of Sir Nathaniel Rich, and probably a near relation of Dr. Stoughton's wife, had witnessed the elder Dr. Cudworth's deathbed testament. Also present was the minister Anthony Earbury of nearby Westonzoyland.

As stepfather he took in hand the education of his wife's young sons and daughters. The younger Ralph later described this as a "diet of Calvinism". Stoughton was awarded the degree of Doctor of Divinity in 1626. Under his instruction his stepchildren flourished, and he thought Ralph Cudworth (junr.) 'as wel grounded in Schol-Learning as any Boy of his Age that went to the University', when commencing his studies at Emmanuel College in 1632.

In 1630 Stoughton's brother Thomas (by then married and with a family) was among the emigrants in the sailing of the Mary and John of London to New England, arranged by John White of Dorchester, Dorset to found the town of Dorchester, Boston, in Massachusetts Bay Colony. A younger brother Israel Stoughton followed in 1632.

=== St Mary Aldermanbury, City of London ===
In that year Dr. Stoughton left Aller and was appointed curate and preacher in the City of London church of St Mary Aldermanbury, a strong focus of Puritanism, in the place of Thomas Taylor. In October 1632 John Winthrop and John Wilson, hearing of his favour for spreading the Gospel in New England, wrote from Boston inviting him to take up his ministry there. Stoughton remained in London: in the nine months from Michaelmas to Midsummer he preached three sermons a week, and two a week during the late summer. In 1634 his eldest stepson James Cudworth emigrated permanently to Scituate, Plymouth Colony. Mary Stoughton died in the summer of 1634, and in December of that year Cudworth wrote at length to his stepfather describing John Endicott's mutilation of the banner and detailing the appointments of ministers and teachers in the various New England townships. Israel Stoughton's letter to his brother also referred to the political and religious differences occasioned by the mutilation of the flag.

Dr Stoughton's wide circle of correspondence reflected his involvement in, or support for, the propagation and unification of international Protestantism. Through 1634 and 1635 he received news of English ministers (John Davenport, William Ames and others) in Amsterdam and Delft through James Forbes (son of John Forbes, pastor of the British church at Delft). John White had mediated John Dury's approach to Dr Stoughton for funds, and Stoughton was among those who supported Dury's journey to Sweden. He was among the "several Godly Ministers" engaged in compiling the Body of Practical Divinity advocated to James Ussher at this time. John Browne the younger of Frampton, Dorset, a close associate of John White's, and committee member of the Dorchester (New England) Company, 1624–1627, was writing familiarly to Stoughton in August 1634 to condole over the death of his wife, and to bring news of the Earl of Holland's fines and of superstitious ceremonies being enforced in the English Church. These sympathies were already attracting the attention of Archbishop Laud's agents when Henry Whitfield wrote to Stoughton in March 1635, saying he had heard that Stoughton was likely to be questioned.

=== Arrest ===
It was however in October 1635, when a carrier was asked by John White and John Browne in Dorchester (Dorset) to take a large sum of money to Dr Stoughton in London, purportedly inheritance money owing to Stoughton's stepchildren, that tongues fell to wagging and "twatlinge". It was officially suspected that this was the "Puritan purse", money collected to support the dissenting puritan ministry at home and abroad. Sir John Lambe, who dared not act alone, persuaded Laud to have the papers of Stoughton, White and Browne searched. Stoughton's study was sealed and the correspondence found, including a particularly dangerous letter, addressed via a third party for concealment, from Sir Thomas Wroth, newly written from Petherton, lamenting the state of the Church and speaking of "resistance in blood". Stoughton and White were arrested and brought before William Juxon, Bishop of London, and the Court of High Commission. Samuel Hartlib bore news of Stoughton's danger to Amsterdam, where John Dury, fearing to be implicated, sought to dissociate himself, and Dury's patron Sir Thomas Rowe sought to reassure him.

With the support of Sir Robert Harley and the Earl of Holland Stoughton managed to escape the worst consequences, though the investigation against him continued until May 1636, when he was discharged. Archbishop Laud, accounting for the year 1635, wrote that Dr Stoughton had been "convented" for breach of the canons of the Church in sermons or practice (or both): but he having promised amendment for the future, and submission to the Church in all things, proceedings were not continued against him. Various surviving letters, and a list of contributors in the Hartlib Papers, do suggest that Stoughton was acting as a treasurer and distributor for puritan funds. Letters of July and September 1636 from Stoughton to Samuel Hartlib show him eager to support Dury. In March 1637 Sir Nathaniel Brent reported that letters of Stephen Marshall, minister of Finchingfield in Essex, deemed to be a dangerous person, had been found in the search of Stoughton's papers. Marshall mediated between Stoughton and White, and Hartlib and Dury, concerning funds from Katherine Barnardiston's bequest. Among Stoughton's other correspondents were Samuel Ward and William Sancroft.

=== Later life ===
In January 1635/36 Stoughton took as his second wife Jane, the widowed daughter of John Browne, by whom he had two daughters, and acquired further stepchildren. Three months after their marriage Elizabeth Cudworth, sister of James, Ralph and John, married the Rutland clergyman Josias Beacham. Beacham was rector of Seaton in Rutland; this has given rise to a confusion, for John White purchased the rectory of Seaton with Beer in Devon to support the church of Dorchester, and a connection has been mis-inferred.

Robert Woodford the diarist frequently heard Stoughton's preaching. He admired him as one "who deales honestly and faithfully and boldly", and thought the continuing pressure brought upon him by the authorities to be through "the malice of Satan and his instruments". He chose Dr Stoughton to act as a referee in the settlement of a dispute in which he became involved. He was also frequently heard by diarist Samuel Rogers, who was usually stirred by his preaching, though on one occasion slightly disappointed.

Dr Stoughton was a friend of Samuel Hartlib and a member of the Hartlib Circle. Some letters survive. Stoughton's millennial pamphlet Felicitas ultimi saeculi was in the form of an address, dated 1638, to John Tolnai (a contact of Comenius) in Hungary. Two years later, after Stoughton's death, Hartlib published the pamphlet with a covering letter of his own, and a dedication to György Rákóczi. Hugh Trevor-Roper comments on the language of inauguration of international Protestantism in this work, which upholds Comenius, Francis Bacon and John Dury as its apostles.

In addition to this work, Stoughton prepared a large number of his own sermons for publication towards the end of his life. In his stepfather's last months Ralph Cudworth sought his guidance in the question of a possible college fellowship. Dr. Stoughton died in May 1639 making his wife Jane and her father John Browne his executors, with legacies to her and to their two daughters, and gifts of £25 each to Emmanuel College and to 'Mr Hartlipp a Dutchman'. Jane Stoughton delivered his sermons to the editor who saw them through the press.

== Family ==
John Stoughton married first (c.1624) Mary Machell, widow of Dr Ralph Cudworth senr (Rector of Aller c. 1610–1624), by whom he had no issue. He married secondly (18 Jan. 1635/36) Jane Browne (widow of Walter Newburgh, Rector of Symondsbury, Dorset 1624–31, to whom John Browne, father and son, were executors). Jane died before 1 November 1658. John and Jane Stoughton had two daughters,

- Jane Stoughton (c.1637-1680). As her mother Jane Stoughton née Browne was dead in 1658, this daughter is very likely the Jane Stoughton who married Thomas Burwell, Doctor of Physick of Dorchester, on 15 September 1659 at Frampton, by whom she had two sons and three daughters, and was buried at Frampton on 5 March 1679/80.
- Marie Stoughton, buried at Frampton in 1640.

In New England, John's brother Thomas Stoughton (1588–1661) was among the group which left Dorchester, Massachusetts to establish the town of Windsor in the Connecticut River Valley in 1635. His brother Israel Stoughton (c.1603-1644) was a co-worker with John Endicott in Massachusetts Colony, and Israel's son William Stoughton (1631–1701), John Stoughton's nephew, lived to be chief magistrate at the Salem witch trials of 1692–93.

=== The stepchildren ===
Mary Machell's children

- James Cudworth (1612–1682), of Scituate, Massachusetts, strongly disapproved of the religious persecutions against Quakers during the later 1650s, and stood out against their treatment. He became an Assistant Governor of Massachusetts and a Commissioner of the United Colonies.
- Elizabeth Cudworth (1615–1654) became the second of three wives of Josias Beacham of Broughton, Northamptonshire (Rector of Seaton, Rutland from 1627 to 1676) in 1636, by whom she had several children. Beacham was ejected by the Puritans in 1653 but reinstated by 1662.
- Ralph Cudworth (1617–1688) became a leading philosopher and theologian among the Cambridge Platonists, Regius Professor of Hebrew, and Master of Christ's College, Cambridge: he was the father of Damaris Cudworth Masham (Lady Masham), friend of John Locke.
- Mary Cudworth, christened at Aller 14 February 1618/19.
- John Cudworth (1622–1675), of London and of Bentley, Suffolk, became an Alderman of London and Master of the Worshipful Company of Girdlers in 1667–68. He left four orphans of whom Thomas (1661–1726) and Benjamin (d. 1725) both attended Christ's College, Cambridge.
- A certain Jane or Joan Cudworth living unmarried in 1647 might also have been a daughter of Mary's (the youngest?), but this is not finally confirmed.

Jane Browne's children

- John Newburgh (living 1658)
- Elizabeth Newburgh (living 1658)

== Published works ==
Dr. Stoughton's sermons and other works were mostly published in the year after his death, and were edited by Anthony Burgess. The opening dedications indicate that "The Widdow of the deceased Authour, in testimonie of her humble and thankefull acknowledgement of his noble favour and respect, shewed to her dearest Husband in his life time, presenteth these ensuing Sermons, which are now, according to the trust reposed in him, published by A.B."

- A Learned Treatise: in Three Parts, 1. The definition 2. The distribution of Divinity 3. The happinesse of man; as it was scholastically handled by John Stoughton D.D. in Immanuell Colledge Chappell in Cambridge, while he was fellow there: and now published according to the copy left under his own hand (John Bellamy, Daniel Frere and Ralph Smith, London 1640).
- Seaven Sermons, Preached Vpon Severall Occasions.

1. The Christians Prayer for the Churches Peace. One Sermon on Psal. 122.6 (Preached at the Mercers' chapel). One Sermon on 1 Sam. 2.30
2. Baruchs Sore Gently Opened; Gods Salve Skilfully Applyed. In two Sermons on Jeremy 45.5.
3. The Araignement of Coveteousnesse. In three Sermons on Luke 12.15.
By John Stoughton, Doctor in Divinitie, sometimes fellow of Immanuel Colledge in Cambridge, late of Aldermanbury, London. (Iohn Bellamie, Henry Overton, Iohn Rothwell, Richard Serger, and Ralph Smith, London 1640).

- XV. Choice Sermons : Preached upon Selected Occasions.

1. The Happinesse of Peace: before K. James at Trinity Colledge in Cambridge.
2. The Love-sicke Spouse: at S. Paul's Crosse.
3. The Burning Light: at a visitation in Christ's Church, London.
4. The Magistrates Commission, or, Wisdome Justified: before the judges.
5. The preachers dignity, and duty: in five sermons, on 2 Cor. 5.20. Preached in Cambridge.
6. Christ Crucified, the Tree of Life: in sixe sermons, on 1 Cor. 2.2. Preached in Cambridge.
By John Stoughton, Doctor in Divinity, sometime fellow of Immanuel Colledge in Cambridge, late preacher of Aldermanburie, London. According to the originall copie, which was left perfected by the authour before his death. (I. Bellamie, H. Overton, I. Rothwell, R. Royston, D. Frere, and R. Smith, London 1640).

- XIII. Sermons: Preached in the Church of Aldermanbury, London.

1. The Form of Wholsome Words, or An Introduction to the Body of Divinity. In 3 sermons on 2 Tim. 1.13.
2. The Righteous Mans Plea to True Happinesse. In 10 sermons on Psal. 4.6.
By John Stoughton, Doctor in Divinity, sometimes fellow of Immanuel College in Cambridge, and late preacher of Aldermanbury, London. (J. Bellamy, H. Overton, A. Crook, J. Rothwell, R. Sergeir, J. Crook, D. Frere, and R. Smith, London 1640).

- The Heauenly Conuersation and the Naturall Mans Condition: In two treatises.

By Iohn Stoughton, Doctor in Divinitie, sometimes fellow of Emanuel Colledge in Cambridge; and late preacher of Gods word in Aldermanbury London. (John Bellamie and Ralph Smith, at the three Golden Lyons, London, 1640).

- Felicitas Ultimi Sæculi: epistola in qua, inter alia, calamitosus ævi præsentis status seriò deploratur, certa felicioris posthac spes ostenditur, & ad promovendum publicum Ecclesiæ & rei literariæ bonum omnes excitantur: in gratiam amici cujusdam paulo ante obitum, scripta à reverendo viro Johanne Stoughtono, SS. Theol. Doctore, Coll. Emanuel. Cantabr. olim socio, postea, eccles. Aldermanburiensis Londini, pastore dignissimo: nunc, post decessum ejus ad fidem autographi, publici juris facta à S.H. (Samuel Hartlib). (Londini : Typis Richardi Hodgkinson, impensis Danielis Frere habitantis in Parva Britannia, ad insigne Tauri rubri, Anno MDCXL). (1640)
