= Plymouth General Court =

The General Court of the Plymouth Colony
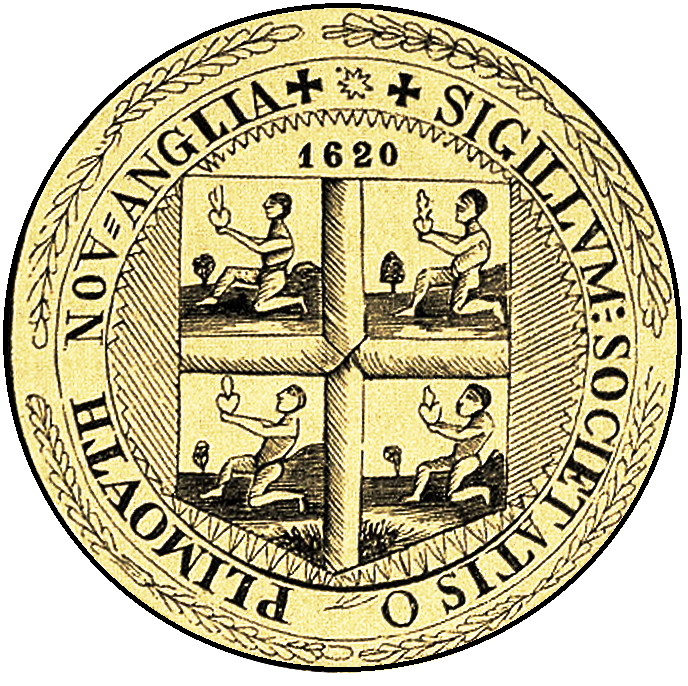
- Seal of the Plymouth Colony

Type
- Houses: Upper House (de facto): Council of Assistants; Lower House (de facto): Assembly (1620-1639); Assembly of Freemen (1639-1691)

History
- Founded: 1620
- Disbanded: 1691
- Succeeded by: (1686-1689); Council of New England (After 1691); Great and General Court of Massachusetts Bay

Leadership
- Governor: John Carver (first); Thomas Hinckley (last)

Meeting place
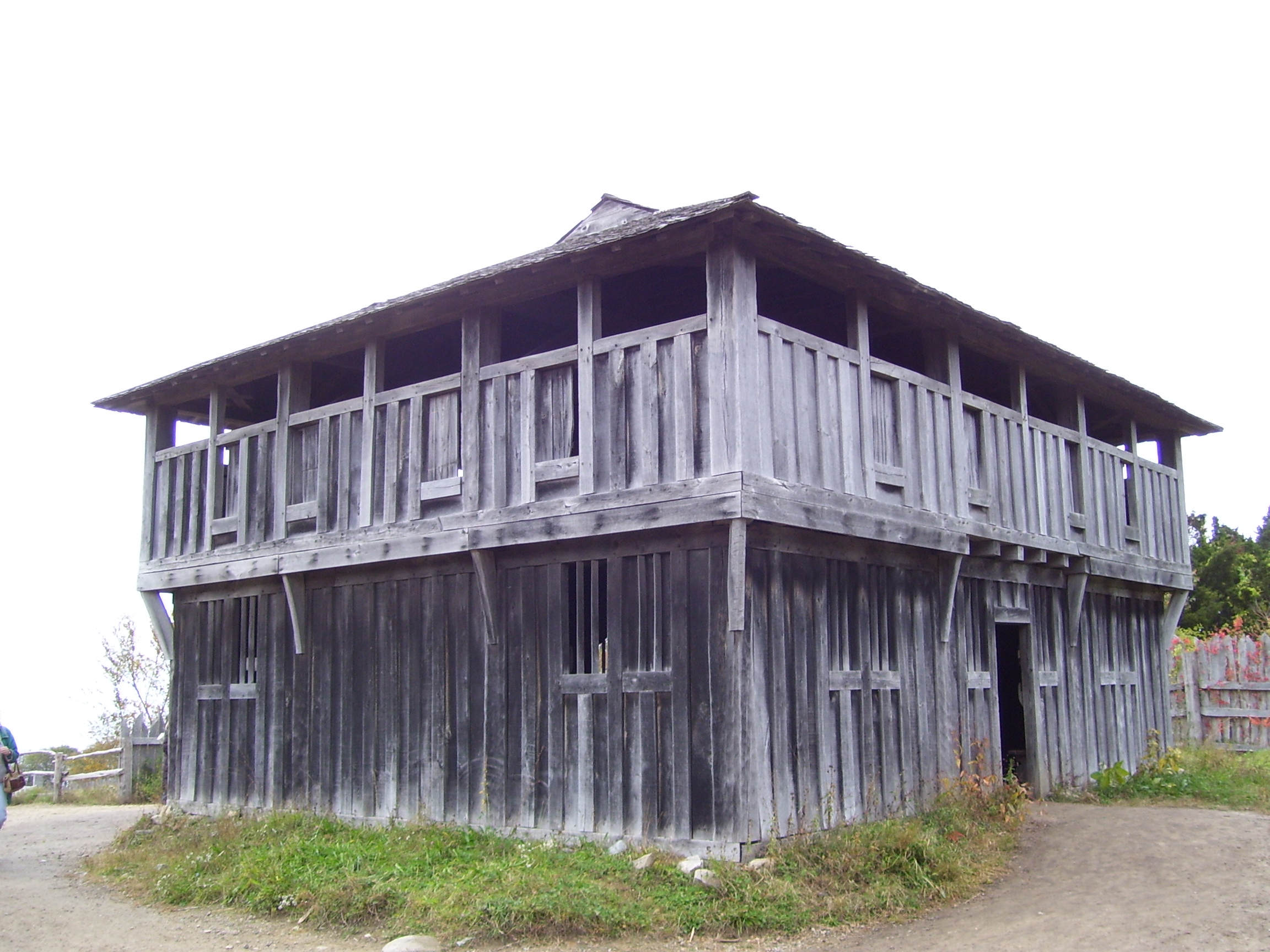
- Burial Hill

Constitution
- Agreement Between the Settlers of New Plymouth

The Plymouth General Court (formally styled, The General Court of Plymouth Colony) was the original colonial legislature of the Plymouth Colony from 1620 to 1692. The body also sat in judgment of judicial appeals cases.

== History ==
The General Court of the Colony of New Plymouth was founded in 1620 when the Pilgrims came to New England, and the General Court served as the colony's legislature and judicial court. In 1636 the Court created North America's first written legal code with a set of statutes including a rudimentary bill of rights protecting traditional liberties such as the right to a jury trial. The early law of the colony was based roughly on English common law and Mosaic law, but the judicial structure resembled local manor and borough courts in England rather than the higher King's Court, which created the common law. The early Plymouth General Court met within the fort on Burial Hill near Cole's Hill in downtown Plymouth.

The Plymouth Colony was officially incorporated by charter into the Province of Massachusetts Bay on October 7, 1691, although the General Court of the Plymouth Colony remained in effective government until the new charter arrived on May 14, 1692, carried by William Phips. The last official meeting of the Plymouth General Court occurred on June 8, 1692. The Plymouth General Court was officially disestablished in 1692 when the Massachusetts Colony with its Massachusetts General Court and Massachusetts Supreme Judicial Court took over Plymouth's former jurisdiction.

Initially the General Court consisted of the Governor of the colony, the Council of Assistants (an advice and consent body), and all the colony's Freemen. Unlike other New England colonies which used a more representative system, such as the Massachusetts Bay Colony, all the officers of the General Court were directly elected by the Freemen. At this early stage of the Colony's history the body of Freemen consisted of only the signatories to the Mayflower Compact. The Governor and Assistants acted as magistrates with legislative function being reserved for the Freemen in an open assembly. This form of direct democracy was similar to the open town meeting system still in place in many New England towns. However this method of governance did not last due to the inconvenience and cost of travel that colonists would have to endure to meet at the General Court. In 1639 changes were made which allowed Freemen of each town of the colony to elect from themselves 2 magistrates/delegates (the town of Plymouth was allowed 4). These delegates would act as local magistrates who could hear local cases and would also serve as delegates to the General Court. There were provisions which allowed these delegates to be removed from office if they were found to be "troublesome". Some elements of direct democracy remained, such as the officers continuing to be elected from the whole body of freemen and not by the delegates of the Court.

Who counted as a Freeman changed over the history of the Plymouth Colony. The original restrictions, limiting the freemen to those original Compact signatories, was amended to include additional signatories. Some exclusions to this included groups such as Quakers and Ranters. Signing of the compact required an oath of fidelity, and since groups such as Quakers are not permitted to take oaths they were to be excluded from Plymouth political life. In 1671 the qualifications for Freemen liberalized again allowing any Puritan man over 21 years old who possessed property worth over £20 to be considered.

== See also ==
- Governor of Massachusetts
- Massachusetts Supreme Judicial Court
- Massachusetts General Court

== Bibliography ==
Davis, William T. (1900). History of the Judiciary of Massachusetts, Including the Plymouth and Massachusetts Colonies, the Province of Massachusetts Bay, and the Commonwealth. The Boston Book Company. ISBN 9780306706134.
