= Church of St Andrew, Aller =

Church in Somerset, England

Church of St Andrew
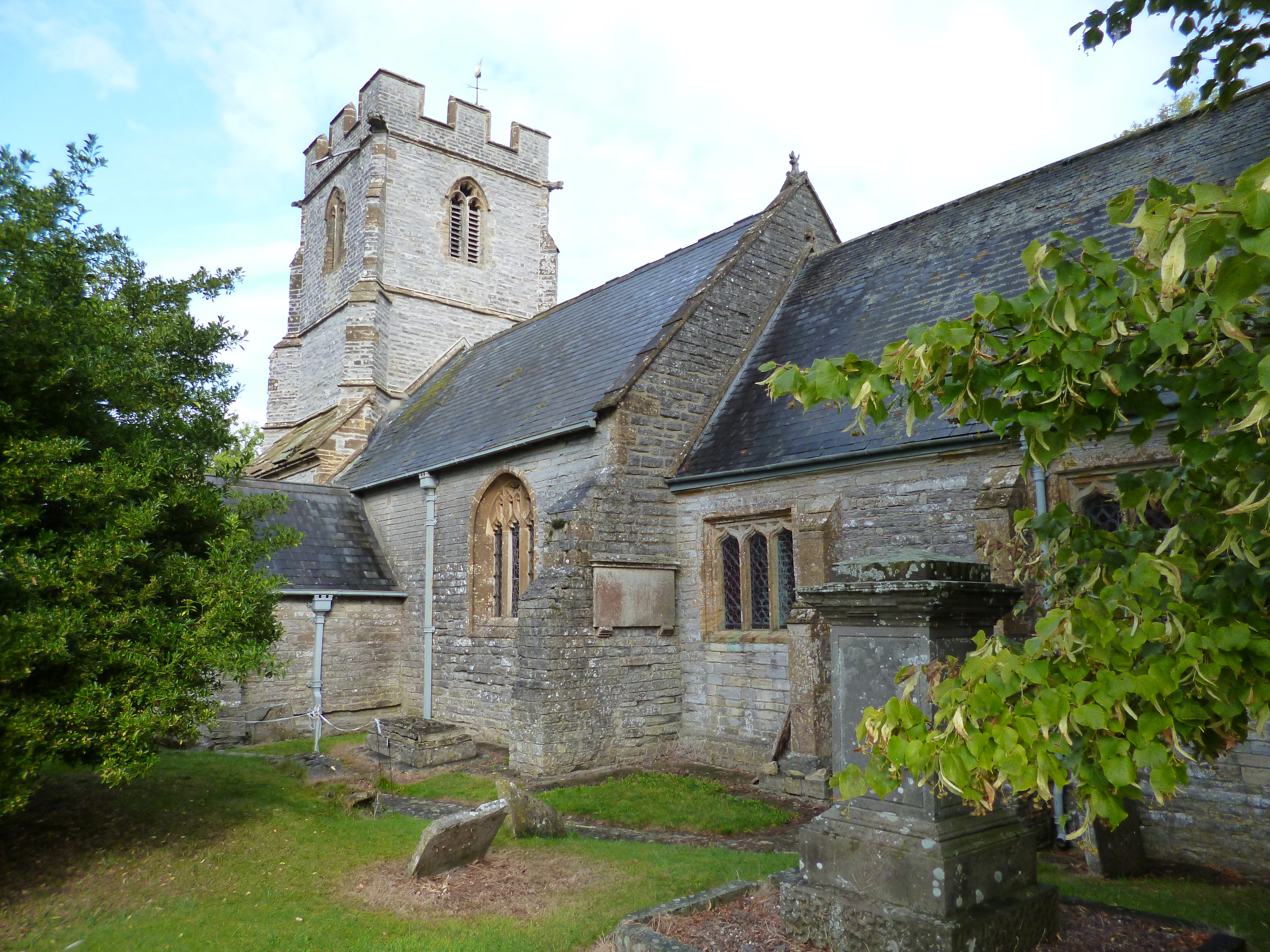

- Location within Somerset
- 51.0554°N 2.8627°W
- Location: Aller, Somerset, England

History
- Built: 11th century

Listed Building – Grade II*
- Official name: Church of St Andrew
- Designated: 17 April 1959
- Reference no.: 1227327

The Anglican Church of St Andrew in Aller, Somerset, England, was built in the 11th century. It is a Grade II* listed building.

== History ==
The Church of St Andrew has Saxon origins with some parts dating from the 12th and 13th centuries, from which the door and a window remain. Restoration work has been undertaken several times since, the most major of which was in 1861–62 by John Norton, which included the addition of a vestry.

Historic England has included it in the Heritage at Risk Register. Work has been carried out on the tower but further work of the roofs is needed.

The parish is part of the benefice of Aller, High Ham with Low Ham and Huish Episcopi cum Langport within the Diocese of Bath and Wells.

== Architecture ==
The hamstone building has slate roofs. It consist of a three-bay nave and two-bay chancel. The three-stage tower is supported by corner buttresses.

Inside the church most fittings are from the 19th century, but the timber pulpit survives from 1610 and it has two fonts one tulip shaped and the other octagonal. The font is a simple limestone bowl, less than a metre tall, which is thought to be Saxon in origin, one of only three in England and was possibly the one used for the baptism of Guthrum after his defeat by King Alfred The Great after the Battle of Ethandun in 878. It was retrieved from the pond of the vicarage garden around 1870 and now stands in the south-west corner of the nave. A copy of the font was made by a stonemason in Corvallis, Oregon, in the 1880s, to memorialise the son of the rector of Aller, Rev. J.Y. Nicholson. The copy of Aller's historic font was in the Episcopalian Church of the Good Samaritan.

== See also ==
- List of ecclesiastical parishes in the Diocese of Bath and Wells
