= Lees (surname) =

- Language: English

Origin
- Language: English
- Meaning: "open place"

Lees is a surname meaning "open place," deriving from several locations in England, including Buckinghamshire, Hampshire, Cheshire, Lincolnshire, Wiltshire.

Notable people with the surname include:

- Alex Lees, (born 1993), English cricketer
- Andrew Lees (environmentalist) (1949–1994), British environmentalist
- Andrew Lees (neurologist) (born 1947), English neurologist
- Arthur Lees (rugby), English rugby union and rugby league footballer who played in the 1890s and 1900s
- Arthur Lees (1908–1992), English golfer
- Benjamin Lees (1924–2010), American classical music composer
- Brian Lees (born 1953), Massachusetts politician
- Brian Lees (geographer) (born 1944), Australian geographer
- Camilla Lees (born 1989), Australian netball player
- Charles Lees (disambiguation)
- Daryanne Lees (born 1986), Cuban-Puerto Rican model and beauty queen
- David Lees (1881–1934), Scottish public health expert
- Edwin Lees (1800–1887), British botanist and antiquarian
- Sir Elliott Lees, 1st Baronet (1860–1908), British Conservative Party politician and soldier
- Geoffrey Lees (cricketer) (1920–2012), English cricketer
- Geoffrey Lees (footballer) (1933–2019), English footballer
- Geoff Lees (racing driver) (born 1951), English racing driver
- George Harmon Lees (fl. 1911–1912), mayor of Hamilton, Ontario
- Harcourt Lees (1776–1852), Irish political pamphleteer
- Harrington Clare Lees (1870–1929), Anglican archbishop of Melbourne
- Jack Lees (1884–1940), British politician
- Jack Lees (footballer) (1892–1983), English footballer
- Jim Lees (1919–2004), Commissioner of the New South Wales Police
- Joanne Lees (born 1973), British girlfriend of Peter Falconio (murder victim in Australia)
- John Lees (disambiguation)
- Marjory Lees (1878–1970), British suffragist and politician
- Meg Lees (born 1948), member of the Australian Senate
- Merv Lees, Australian rugby league footballer
- Nathaniel Lees (born 1972), New Zealand actor and theatre director
- Paris Lees, British journalist and activist
- Renee Lees (1883–1966), Australian pianist and theatre organist
- Robert Lees (disambiguation)
- Sarah Lees (1842–1935), English politician, activist and philanthropist
- Sue Lees (1941–2002), English academic, activist, feminist and writer
- Susan H. Lees, American anthropologist and human ecologist
- Terry Lees (born 1952), English footballer
- Tom Lees (born 1990), English footballer
- Walter Lees (cricketer) (1875–1924), English Test cricketer
- Walter Edwin Lees (1887–1957), American aviator
- Warren Lees (born 1952), New Zealand Test cricketer

== The Lees family of Oldham ==
Lees is a small suburb of Oldham located on the old Lancashire-Yorkshire border. The name Lees is an old Saxon word for the field systems that developed in this locality. lees meaning literally 'field'.

In this area of South East Lancashire along with Oldham many former cotton producing towns such as Bolton, Bury, Middleton, Royton, Crompton and Chadderton, there are many families who still bear the name of Lees. A Lees Hall once stood on the outskirts of Oldham which was demolished in the mid nineteenth century and unfortunately there are no surviving images. The Parish records of the town are littered with name of Lees dating back to the fourteenth century.

== See also ==
- James Lees-Milne (1908–1997), English writer and expert on country houses
