= List of members of the Old Southportonians Association =

This is a List of members of the Old Southportonians Association being notable old boys of the Anglican The Southport School, in Southport, Queensland, Australia. The Old Southportonians Association (OSA) is the alumni organisation for Old Boys of the school. The OSA celebrated its 100 years as a recognised body in 2007.

== Arts, media and sciences ==
- James Blundell – singer
- Sidney Cotton – inventor of the 'Sidcot' flight suit
- Ben Dark – television presenter, Getaway, Nine Network
- Sir Lorimer Dods – founder of the Children's Medical Research Institute
- Tai Hara – actor
- Stewart Morris – singer, member of The Ten Tenors
- Paul Whittaker – Editor-in-Chief, The Australian
- Rod Young – news anchor for Seven Network

== Business and politics ==
- Rob Borbidge – Premier of Queensland
- John Moore – former Federal Liberal Defence Minister
- Bill O'Chee – Queensland Senator
- Glen Sheil – Queensland Senator
- Paul Whittaker – CEO Sky News Australia

== Military ==
- General Sir Arthur MacDonald – Chief of Defence Force Staff (1977–1979)
- Lieutenant General Robert Harold Nimmo – head of UN Military Observer Group in Pakistan and India (1952–1966)
- Vice Admiral Sir David Stevenson – Chief of Naval Staff (1973–1976)
- Air Marshal Darren Goldie – Air Commander Australia (2022–2023), National Cyber Security Coordinator (2023)

== Sport ==
- Chris Atkinson, World Rally Championship driver
- Courtney Atkinson, triathlete
- Andrew Baildon, swimmer
- Shaun Barry, rugby union player with Queensland Reds
- Mathew Belcher, sailor
- Gregory Brough, swimmer
- Adam Brown, British swimmer
- Caleb Brown, rugby union player with the Queensland Reds
- Eddie Broad, rugby union player for Queensland and Australia
- Vitori Buatava, rugby union player with the Fiji national rugby union team
- John Buchanan, an Australian cricket player
- Jarrad Butler, rugby union player with the Queensland Reds and ACT Brumbies
- Jock Campbell, rugby union player for the Queensland Reds
- Richard Charlesworth, British swimmer
- Jack Doohan, Australian F1 driver for Alpine
- David Duley, rugby union player for the Queensland Reds
- Trent Durrington, baseball player for the Anaheim Angels
- Caine Eckstein, ironman at the Northcliff Surf Life Saving Club
- Shannon Eckstein, ironman at the Northcliff Surf Life Saving Club
- Nathan Eyres-Brown, rugby union player with the Queensland Reds
- Sosefo Fifita , rugby league player with the Gold Coast Titans
- Duncan Free, rower
- Wally Fullerton-Smith, rugby league player with the Queensland State of Origin Team
- Jye Gray, rugby league player for the South Sydney Rabbitohs
- Josh Graham, rugby union player for Queensland Reds and a Rugby league player for the Gold Coast Titans
- Nathan Grey, rugby union player for Australia and the New South Wales Waratahs
- Scott Higginbotham, rugby union player with the Wallabies, the Queensland Reds, the Rebels, and the NEC Green Rockets
- Peter Jackson, rugby league player with the Queensland State of Origin Team and Australian Rugby League Team
- Lloyd Johansson, rugby union player with the Wallabies and the Queensland Reds
- Clark Keating, Australian rules footballer for the Brisbane Lions
- Cormac Kennedy-Leverett, Australian representative rower and junior world champion.
- Matthew Kuhnemann, cricketer
- Jono Lance, rugby union player with the Queensland Reds, the NSW Waratahs, and Western Force
- Charles Que Fong Lee, rugby union player for Queensland #462
- Tom Lawton, rugby union player with Queensland & the Wallabies
- Robert Lawton, rugby union player with Queensland, Highlanders & the Wallabies
- Marco Loughran, British swimmer
- Leigh McBean, swimmer
- Broc McCauley, Australian rules footballer for the Brisbane Lions
- Griffin McMaster, soccer player with the Brisbane Roar
- Marcus Marshall, V8 Supercar driver
- Luke Morahan, rugby union player with the Wallabies, the Queensland Reds and Western Force
- Brad Moran, Australian rules footballer for the Adelaide Crows
- Scott Muller, cricketer
- Peter Norman, sprinter who protested Australia's racist policies in the 1968 Olympics Black Power salute alongside John Carlos and Tommie Smith
- Patrick Murtagh, an Australian rules footballer for the Gold Coast Suns
- Bill O'Chee, skeleton player (also see politician)
- Daniel Ritchie, British rower
- Mat Rogers, rugby league and rugby union player with the Gold Coast Titans, the Australian Kangaroos, and the New South Wales Waratahs
- Roger Salter, rugby union player for Queensland #520
- Adam Scott, golf player on the PGA Tour
- UJ Seuteni, rugby union player with Toulon and Oyonnax
- Nathan Sharpe, rugby union player with the Wallabies, the Queensland Reds and Western Force
- Ainslie Glenister Ross Sheil, rugby union player for the Wallabies #415 and Queensland #635
- Glenister Sheil, rugby union player for Queensland #646
- James Slipper, rugby union player with the Wallabies and the Queensland Reds
- Rob Simmons, rugby union player with the Wallabies and the Queensland Reds
- Billy Stanlake, cricketer
- Nathan Stapleton, rugby league player with the Cronulla Sharks
- Lausii Taliauli, rugby union player with the Brumbies
- Ben Tapuai, rugby union player with the Wallabies, the Queensland Reds, and Western Force
- Blair Tickner, New Zealand cricketer
- Bernard Tomic, tennis player
- Grant Turner, British swimmer
- John Wolfe, rugby union player for the Wallabies (uncapped) and Queensland #760
- Noah Lolesio, rugby union player with ACT Brumbies & the Wallabies
- Zane Nonggorr, rugby union player with Queensland Reds
