= Oldham (surname) =

- Language: English

Origin
- Language: English
- Meaning: "old lands"

Other names
- Variant forms: Oldom, Aldholme

Oldham is a surname meaning "'old lands" with origins tracing to the town of Oldham, in Greater Manchester, England.

People named Oldham include:

- Andrew Loog Oldham (born 1944), British rock group manager
- Arthur Oldham (1926–2003), English chorusmaster, composer
- Carolyn Oldham, Australian environmental water scientist
- Charles Oldham, multiple people
- Chris Oldham (born 1968), American football player
- Denver Oldham (1936–2012), American pianist
- Derek Oldham (1887–1968), English singer and actor
- George Oldham (disambiguation), multiple people
- Greg Oldham (born 1947), American economist
- Henry Yule Oldham, (1862–1951), British geographer
- Hugh Oldham (1450–1519), English bishop
- Jawann Oldham (1957–2026), American basketball player
- John Oldham (disambiguation), multiple people
- Joseph Houldsworth Oldham (1874–1969), Scottish missionary
- Marie Augusta Oldham (1857–1938), India-born American missionary
- Megan Oldham (born 2001), Canadian freestyle skier
- Peter Oldham (1924–2011), English and Rhodesian cricketer
- Ray Oldham (1951–2005), American football player
- Red Oldham (1893–1961), American baseball player
- Richard Oldham (disambiguation), multiple people
- Scott Oldham (born 1969), American journalist
- Spooner Oldham (born 1943), American musician
- Stephen Oldham (born 1948), English cricketer
- Thomas Oldham (1816–1878), British geologist
- Todd Oldham (born 1961), American fashion designer
- William Oldham (disambiguation), multiple people

== See also ==
- Oldham, a large town in Greater Manchester
- List of Old English (Anglo-Saxon) surnames
- Oldham (disambiguation)
