= Charles Lee =

Charles Lee may refer to:

== Politics ==
- Charles Lee (Attorney General) (1758–1815), lawyer and United States Attorney General
- Charles Lee (Australian politician) (1842–1926), Minister for Justice, 1898–1899, and Secretary for Public Works, 1899
- Charles Lee (Hong Kong politician) (born 1936), former chairman of Hong Kong Exchanges and Clearing Limited
- Charles Lee (activist) (active in 1987), American environmental justice activist
- Charles Que Fong Lee (1913–1996) Australian diplomat

== Sports ==
- Charlie Lee (Australian footballer) (1896–1979), Australian rules footballer
- Charles Lee (cricketer) (1924–1999), English first-class cricketer
- Charles A. Lee (born 1977), American sprinting athlete
- Charles Lee (American football) (born 1977), former American football wide receiver
- Charles Lee (basketball) (born 1984), American basketball coach and former player
- Charlie Lee (English footballer) (born 1987), English football player
- Charlie Lee (squash player) (born 1998), English squash player
- Charlie Lee (American football coach) (born 1945), American football coach

== Others ==
- Charles Lee (general) (1732–1782), Anglo-American soldier of the American Revolutionary War
- Charles Lee (British architect) (1803–1880/4–1880), in partnership with Thomas Talbot Bury, 1845–1849
- Charles C. Lee (1834–1923), a pen name for Martha Parmelee Rose
- S. Charles Lee (1899–1990), American architect of U.S movie palaces
- Charles Lee (author) (1870–1956), British author
- Charles Lee (filmmaker), alias of Godfrey Ho, a former Hong Kong film director and screenwriter
- Charles Goodall Lee (1881–1973), first licensed Chinese American dentist in California
- Charles Freeman Lee (1927–1997), American jazz trumpeter
- Charles Lee (active 2004–2006), guitarist of the band Loser
- Charles Lee (scientist) (born 1969), Canadian pathology scientist
- Charles E. Lee (1917–2008), American archivist and historian in South Carolina
- Charlie Lee (computer scientist), creator of Litecoin
- J. Charles Lee, president of Mississippi State University
- Charles M. C. Lee (born 1957), behavioral economist, accounting academic, and asset manager

== See also ==
- Charles Lea (disambiguation)
- Charles Lees (disambiguation)
- Charles Leigh (disambiguation)
- Charles Vaughan-Lee (1867–1928), senior Royal Navy officer
