= Charles Lea =

Charles Lea may refer to:

- Charles Léa (born 1951), Cameroonian footballer
- Charlie Lea (1956–2011), French-born baseball player player
- Charles James Lea (1820s–1884), English interior artist
- Henry Charles Lea (1825–1909), American historian

== See also ==
- Charles Lee (disambiguation), several people
