= Werneth Hall =

Listed building in Greater Manchester, England

- Location within Greater Manchester

General information
- Type: House
- Architectural style: Jacobean
- Location: Werneth, Oldham, Greater Manchester, England
- Coordinates: 53.53361°N 2.12872°W
- Year built: 17th century or earlier
- Governing body: Privately owned

Design and construction
- Designations

Listed Building – Grade II
- Official name: Werneth Hall
- Designated: 25 October 1951
- Reference no.: 1201652

Werneth Hall is a Grade II listed privately owned Jacobean manor house in the Werneth area of Oldham, Greater Manchester, England.

== History ==
In the reign of Henry III, Alwardus de Aldholme held the manor of Oldham and land in Werneth (Vernet). In the 13th century, Oldham was documented as a manor held from the Crown by a family named Oldham. The Oldhams were relatives of the Bishop of Exeter, Hugh Oldham.

Richard de Oldham was lord of the manor in 1354 and the hall, park and estate passed to his daughter, Margery de Oldham, who married John de Cudworth in the 1370s. The estate passed to their son, John, and to his descendants one of whom, Ralph Cudworth (d. 1572), was the father of the Anglican theologian Ralph Cudworth and grandfather of the Cambridge Platonist Ralph Cudworth. The estate remained in the Cudworth family until Joshua Cudworth (d. 1710) sold it to Sir Ralph Assheton (1651–1716) of Middleton in 1683.

Assheton gave the estate to his daughter, Catherine Assheton (d. 1728), who married Thomas Lister (1688–1745) of Gisburn Park, Yorkshire. The estate passed to their son Thomas Lister (1723–61) and then to his son Thomas Lister, Lord Ribblesdale (1752–1826) who sold it to Parker and Sidebottom of London, for £25,500, in 1792.

In 1795 the Werneth Hall estate was purchased, for £30,000, by the cotton manufacturer John Lees (d. 1823) of Oldham. His son Edward Lees (d. 1835) was succeeded as owner of the hall and lord of the manor by his sons the MP John Frederick Lees (1809–1867) and George Lees. The estate included a park until around 1844 when the hall property was separated from the land and the latter became the public Werneth Park in 1936.

== Architecture ==
There have been three buildings on this site since the Middle Ages. The first Werneth Hall (probably timber and plaster) was destroyed by fire in 1456. The house was rebuilt and was in use until at least the 1590s.

Most of the third (present) building was built between 1590 and 1625, and has been extensively altered. It is in sandstone with a roof partly in Welsh slate and partly in stone flags. There are two storeys with a cellar, a main range with two cross-wings, coped gables and later extensions. The windows are mullioned and transomed. The entrance has a moulded architrave and to the left an inserted French window.

== See also ==
- Listed buildings in Oldham
