= Werneth, Greater Manchester =

Coordinates: 53.535483°N 2.132034°W

Werneth
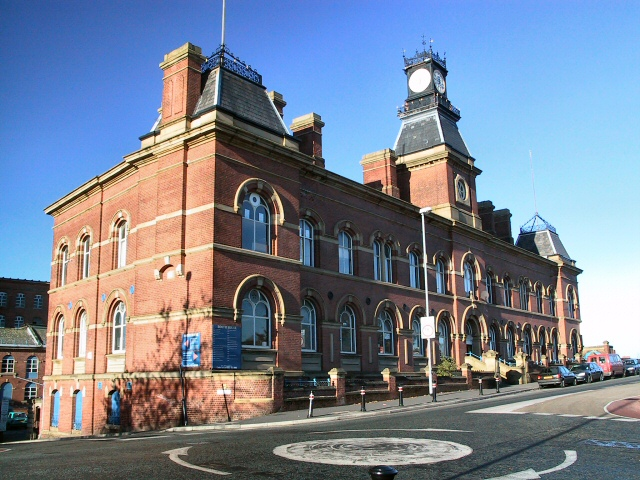
- Booth House is the former headquarters of the Platt Brothers

- Location within Greater Manchester
- Population: 12,348 (Werneth Ward 2011)
- OS grid reference: SD912043
- Metropolitan borough: Oldham
- Metropolitan county: Greater Manchester
- Region: North West
- Country: England
- Sovereign state: United Kingdom
- Post town: OLDHAM
- Postcode district: OL8, OL9
- Dialling code: 0161
- Police: Greater Manchester
- Fire: Greater Manchester
- Ambulance: North West
- UK Parliament: Oldham West and Royton

Werneth (/ˈwɜːrnɛθ/; WUR-nəth) is an area of Oldham, Greater Manchester, England. The population at the 2011 census was 12,348. It is 1 mile (1.6 km) west-southwest of Oldham's commercial centre and one of its most ancient localities. It is contiguous with Westwood, Hollinwood, Hollins and Chadderton. Werneth includes Freehold between Werneth Park and Oldham's border with Chadderton at Block Lane.

In 2017 more than three quarters (76.6%) of Werneth's population were members of an ethnic minority group, with the Pakistani population being largest (48.6%).

== History ==
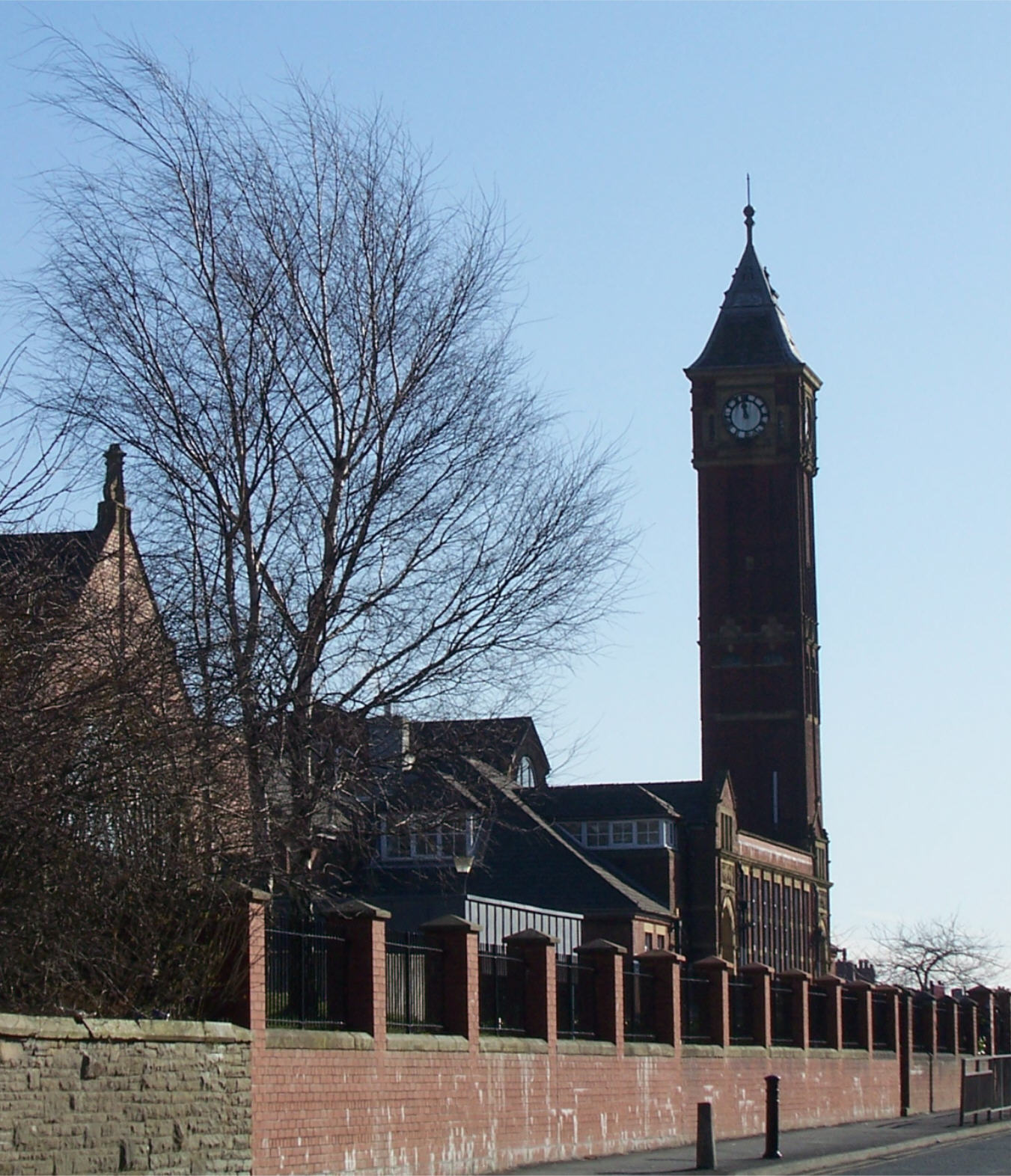
Werneth Junior School Tower

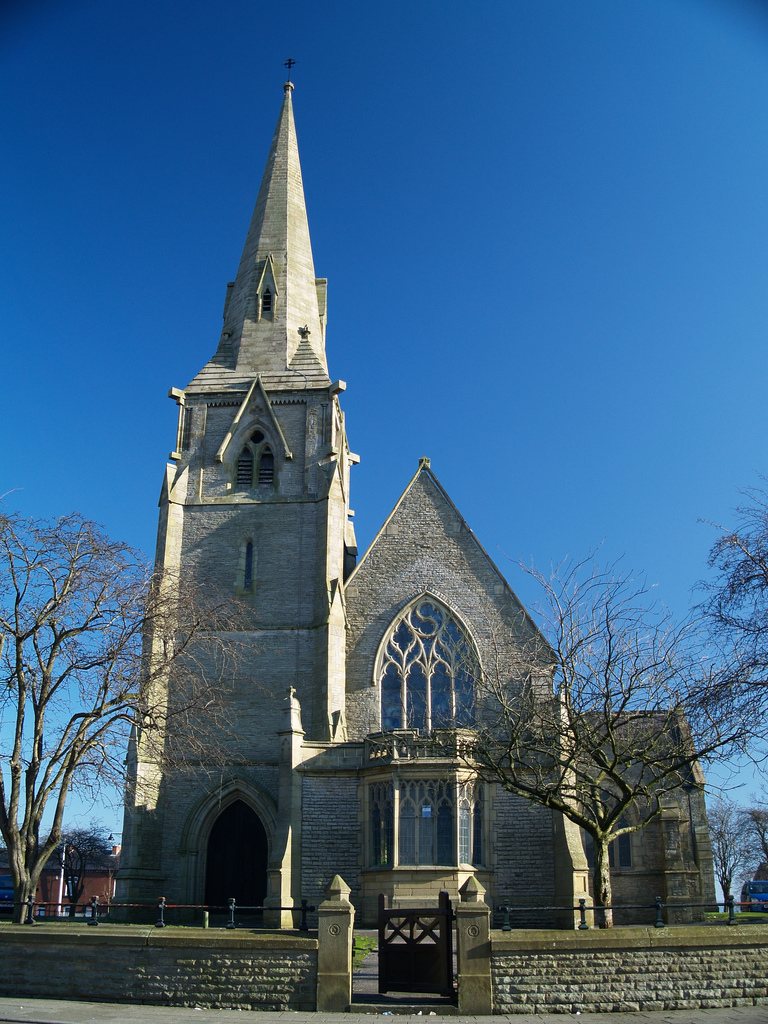
St Thomas's Church, Werneth

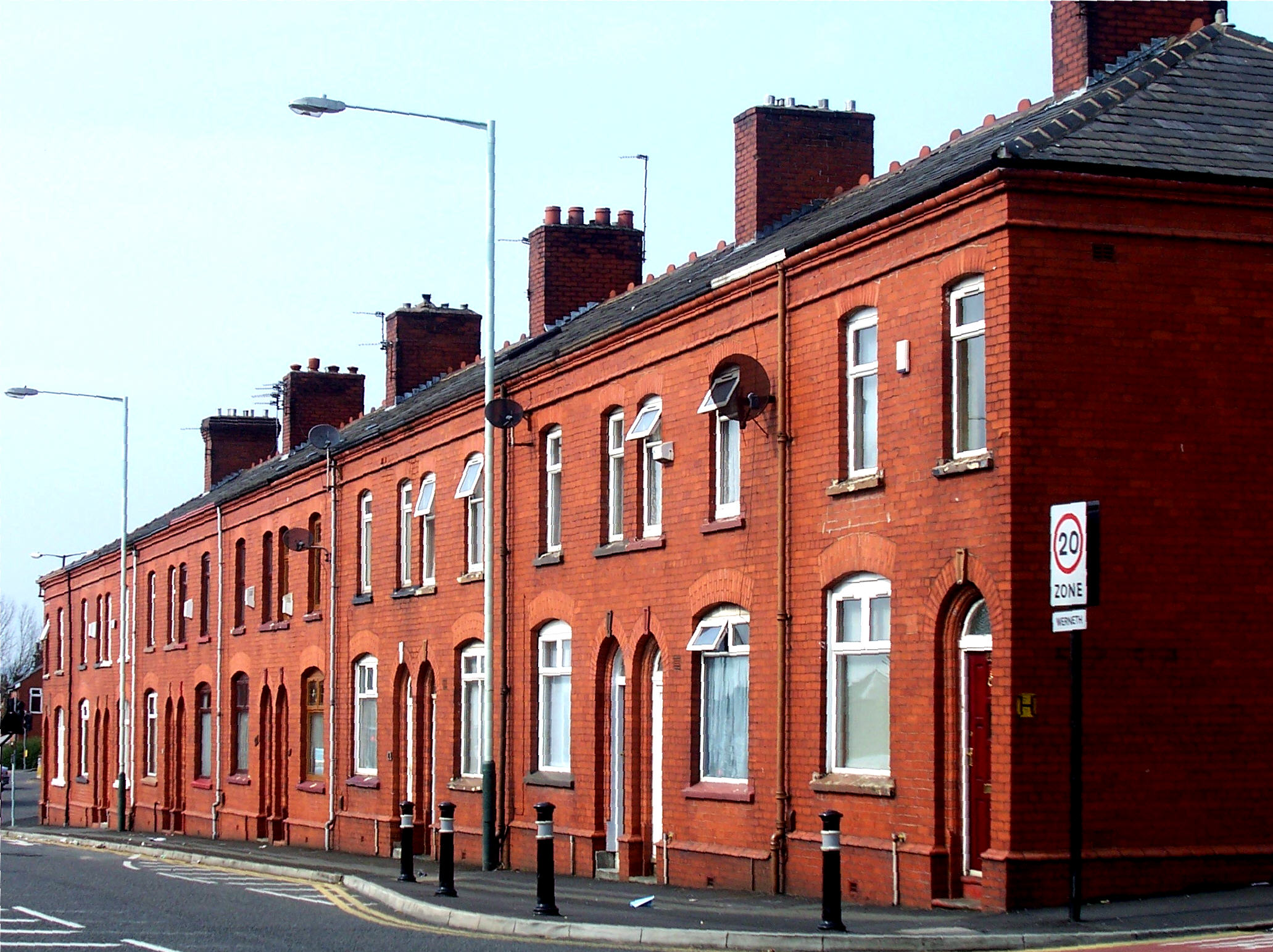
Frederick Street, opposite Werneth Park

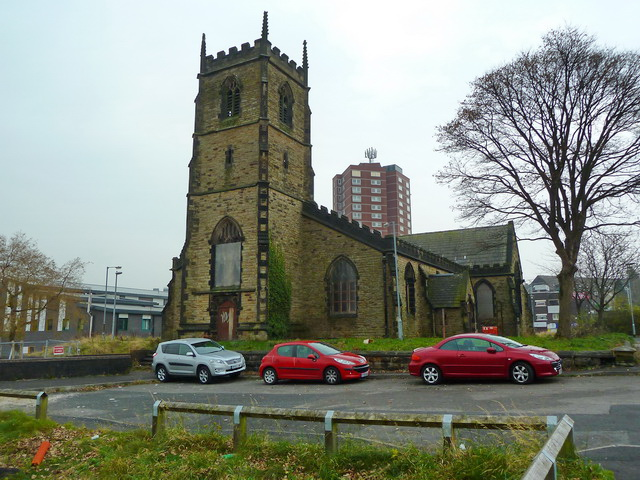
St John's Church

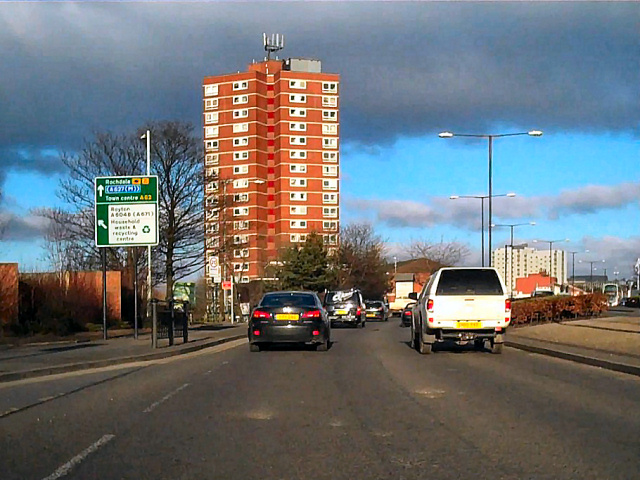
Manchester Street, Werneth

=== Toponymy ===
The name Werneth is ancient and derives from a Brittonic personal name identical to the Gaulish Vernetum, derived from *verno- meaning "alder" (Welsh gwern). The survival of place-names derived from Celtic personal names is rare in England outside Cornwall. The name is cognate with the place-names Le Vernet and Vernois in France.

=== Pre–Industrial Revolution ===
In the reign of Henry III, the manor of Oldham was held by Alwardus de Aldholme who held land in Werneth (Vernet) and lived at Werneth Hall. In the 13th century, Oldham was documented as a manor held from The Crown by a family surnamed Oldham, whose seat was at Werneth Hall. Richard de Oldham was recorded as lord of the manor of Werneth/Oldham (1354). His daughter and heiress, Margery (d.1384), married John de Cudworth (d.1384), from whom descended the Cudworth family of Werneth Hall who were successive lords of the manor of Werneth/Oldham. A Member of this family was James I's Chaplain Ralph Cudworth (father of the Cambridge Platonist philosopher Ralph Cudworth). The Cudworths remained lords of the manor until their sale of the estate (1683) to Sir Ralph Assheton of Middleton. After several owners, the Werneth Hall estate and manor was purchased, for £30,000, by the Lees family of Oldham (1794). In the 1840s, the park of the Hall estate was separated from Werneth Hall to form what later became the public Werneth Park.

The ancient manor of Werneth covered an extensive part of the township of Oldham including much of the current town centre. Surrounding areas such as Hollinwood and Hathershaw were historically described as lands lying in the southern part of Werneth.

Joseph Jones (1782–1858) of Wallshaw Mill, was the first alderman elected for the Werneth Ward of Oldham Council. He was a Conservative and was "elbowed" out in 1852 after which he retired to Severn Stoke in Worcestershire.

=== Industrial Revolution ===
Werneth was an industrial district and from the 19th century was the location of the Platt Brothers works. The engineering company made cotton-spinning machinery for the many mills in Oldham and south Lancashire. Platt Brothers business headquarters were close to Oldham Werneth railway station which has now closed.

Prosperity in the area brought civic development and a significant part of Werneth became Oldham's "grand west end" with large mansions. This part of Werneth is known as Coppice.

=== Werneth Fire Station (1864–1987) ===
In 1864 at a cost of £932 Werneth's first fire engine house opened in John St. It was equipped with a nine-inch manual pump purchased from John Hall of Oldham. It was staffed by police doing auxiliary firefighter work with lamplighters or anyone available as pumpers for sixpence per hour plus liquid refreshments. In 1898 a new station opened on Manchester Rd which was built to plans by Messrs Winder and Taylor, architects of Oldham. It had "the latest improvements and conveniences of firemen’s dwellings which were a special feature at this period and every accommodation will provide for the mental and physical recreation of the men during their leisure hours." The firemen's dwellings on Frederick St remain standing. On 1 April 1948 the station become part of Oldham Fire Brigade and on 1 April 1974 became part of Greater Manchester Fire Service with a new call sign – C34. Werneth Fire station closed in 1981 and the building was demolished in 1987.

== Governance ==
Lying within the historic county boundaries of Lancashire since the early 12th century, Werneth was recorded in 1212 as one of five parts of the thegnage estate of Kaskenmoor held on behalf of King John by Roger de Montbegon and William de Nevill. The other parts were Crompton, Glodwick, Oldham and Sholver. Werneth was part of the township of Oldham, in the ancient ecclesiastical parish of Prestwich-cum-Oldham, in the hundred of Salford.

Werneth is also an electoral ward of the Metropolitan Borough of Oldham. The ward includes the neighbourhoods of Werneth Park, Freehold, Primose Bank, and parts of Coppice and the Block Lane/Old Lane area of Chadderton.

== Geography and geology ==
Werneth covers about one hundred acres, and its geology consists of the coal measures of the Oldham Coalfield which were exploited by several early collieries and sandstone was quarried.

== Transport ==
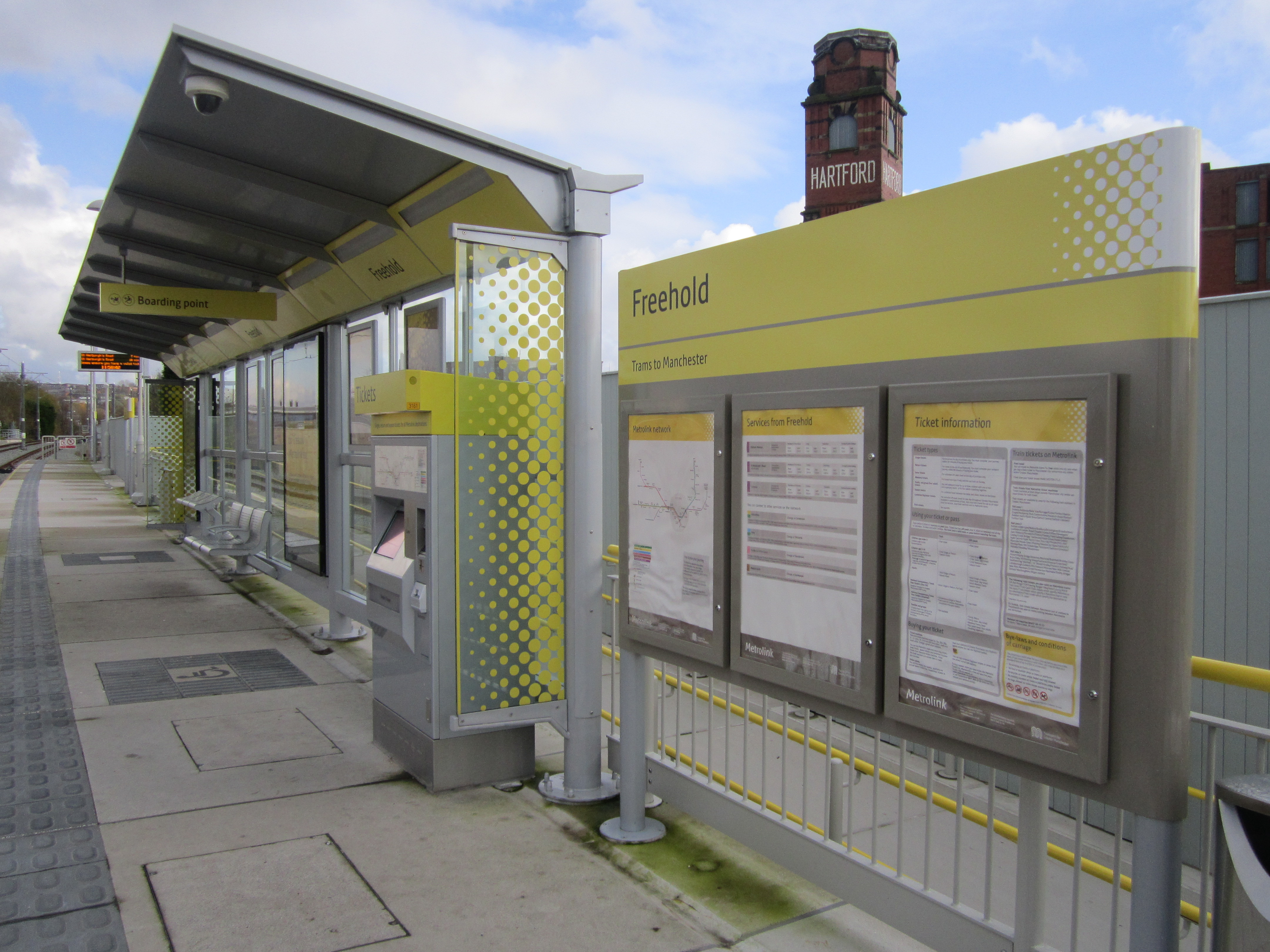
Freehold Metrolink Station

Oldham Werneth railway station on the Oldham Loop Line closed in 2009 when the line was converted to light rail for Manchester Metrolink and replaced by its Oldham and Rochdale Line in 2012. Westwood and Freehold tram stops provide direct tram links to Manchester and beyond and to Rochdale Railway Station and town centre.

First Greater Manchester operates bus services 81 and 83 linking Werneth with Oldham, and Manchester city centre, via Moston and Failsworth with some evening services on route 81 operated by Stagecoach Manchester extending to Derker.

Stotts Tours (Oldham) operates bus service 396 providing links to Ashton-U-Lyne via Hathershaw and to Middleton via Chadderton town centre.

== Sport ==
Werneth Cricket Club's facilities are at The Coppice, Chamber Road. The club was formed in 1864 and joined the Central Lancashire League in 1910. The first completed league match was won at Littleborough by two runs. Werneth became champions of the Central Lancashire League in 1939 in unprecedented circumstances. The club was awarded the title by the League committee, when a point ahead of Radcliffe in the league table, after the committee declared fixtures for the last Saturday of the season abandoned, following the declaration of war with Germany. This proved to be the one and only year the club won the League title.

Notable players have included Geoff Pullar, who played for the club early in his career and went on to represent England in 28 test matches from 1959 to 1963, wicketkeeper Keith Andrew and former West Indies captain, Carl Hooper.

== See also ==
- Werneth Hall
- Werneth Park
