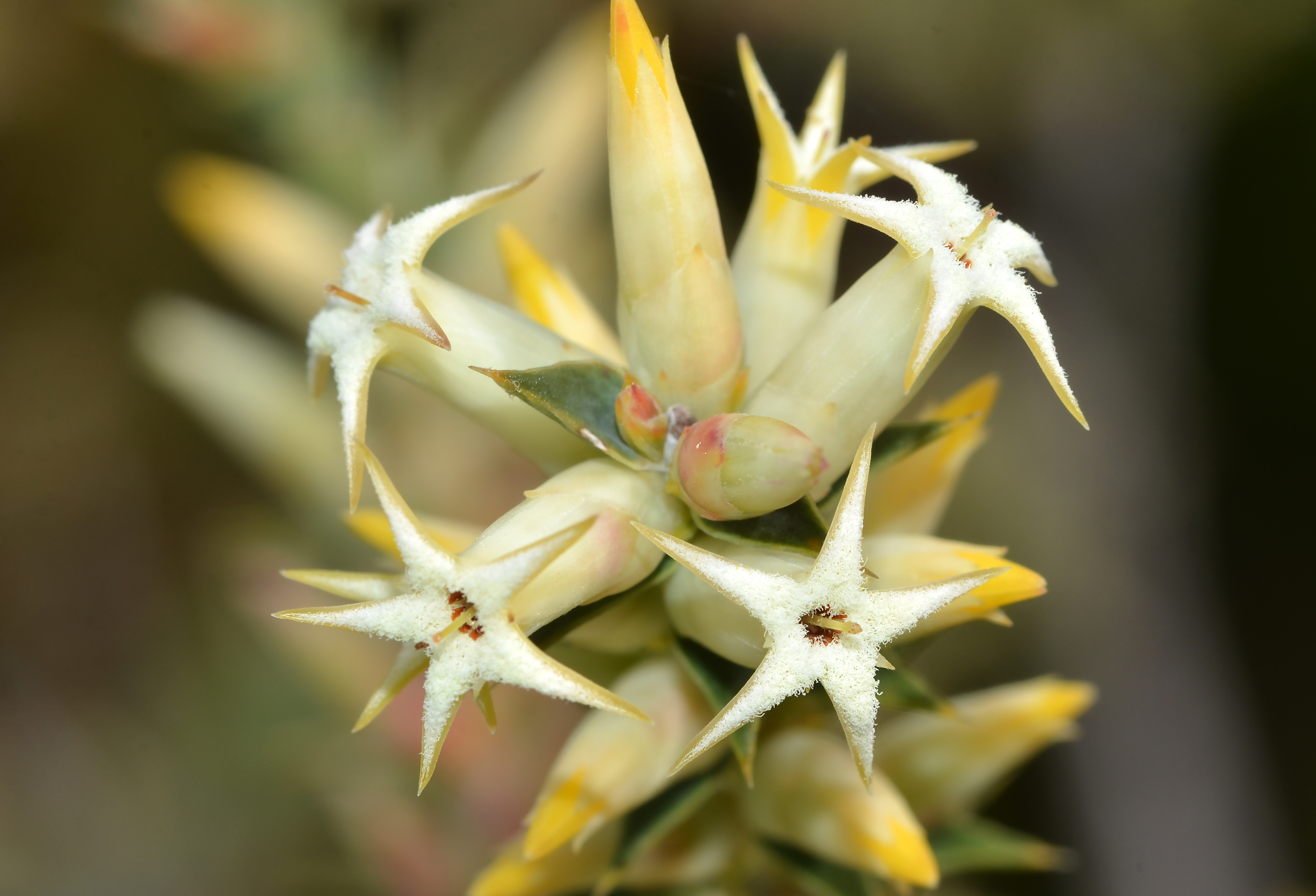
- Near Ellenbrook, Western Australia

Scientific classification
- Kingdom: Plantae
- Clade: Tracheophytes
- Clade: Angiosperms
- Clade: Eudicots
- Clade: Asterids
- Order: Ericales
- Family: Ericaceae
- Genus: Styphelia
- Species: S. kingiana

Binomial name
- Styphelia kingiana F.Muell.

Synonyms
- Croninia kingiana (F.Muell.) J.M.Powell; Leucopogon kingianus (F.Muell.) C.A.Gardner

= Styphelia kingiana =

Species of plant

Styphelia kingiana is a species of flowering plant in the heath family Ericaceae and is endemic to the south-west of Western Australia. It is an erect, compact shrub with sharply pointed, egg-shaped leaves, and white, tube-shaped flowers arranged in clusters near the ends of branchlets.

== Description ==
Styphelia kingiana is an erect, compact shrub that typically grows to a height of 0.4–1 m (1 ft 4 in – 3 ft 3 in) and has densely hairy young branches. Its leaves are sharply-pointed, egg-shaped, 3.3–11.6 mm (0.13–0.46 in) long and 1.5–5.6 mm (0.059–0.220 in) wide. The flowers are borne in clusters near the ends of branchlets, extending past the leaves. There are egg-shaped, fleshy bracts 1.6–2 mm (0.063–0.079 in) long and 3 or 4 almost round bracteoles 1.5–6 mm (0.059–0.236 in) long at the base of the flowers. The sepals are egg-shaped, 1.5–6 mm (0.059–0.236 in) long and pale yellowish-green. The petals are joined at the base to form a yellowish-green tube 6.7–8.3 mm (0.26–0.33 in) long with white, spreading lobes 4.2–6 mm (0.17–0.24 in) long. Flowering occurs in August and September and the fruit is dry, 4–5 mm (0.16–0.20 in) long and 3 mm (0.12 in) wide.

== Taxonomy ==
Styphelia kingiana was first described in 1893 by Ferdinand von Mueller in The Victorian Naturalist from specimens collected near Lake Deborah (near Koolynobbing). The specific epithet (kingiana) honours Henry John King.

== Distribution and habitat ==
This styphelia occurs in sandy soils in open heath or low open woodland in the Avon Wheatbelt, Geraldton Sandplains, Mallee and Swan Coastal Plain bioregions of south-western Western Australia.

== Conservation status ==
Styphelia kingiana is listed as "not threatened" by the Western Australian Government Department of Biodiversity, Conservation and Attractions.
