= Lees-Milne =

Lees-Milne is a surname. Notable people include:

- Alvilde Lees-Milne (née Bridges; formerly Viscountess Chaplin) (1909–1994), British gardening and landscape expert
- James Lees-Milne (1908–1997), English writer and expert on country houses

== See also ==
- Lees (surname)
- Milne (surname)
