= Mary Morris (doctor) =

Welsh doctor and suffragist (1873–1925)

Mary Morris M.B.
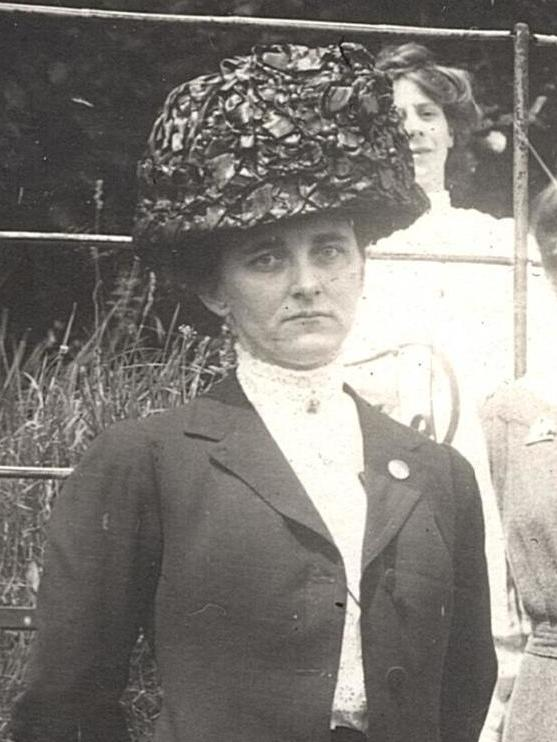
- Born: 9 April 1873; Dolgellau, Merionethshire, Wales
- Died: 11 July 1925 (aged 52); Bath, Somerset, England
- Resting place: Aberystwyth
- Known for: One of the first female Medical Inspectors of Schools and for suffrage activism

Mary Eva Hastings Morris (9 April 1873 – 11 July 1925) was a Welsh medical doctor and suffragist. Born in Dolgellau, she grew up in Malta, before returning to Wales to study medicine at the University College of Wales in Aberystwyth. She went on to become the first female doctor from Aberystwyth. After spells working at Great Ormond Street Children's Hospital in London, the North Devon Infirmary, and Bristol Royal Hospital for Sick Children and Women, Morris moved to Bath, where she worked as a medical inspector.

While in Bath, Morris began participating in the suffragist movement, leading events alongside other suffragists such as Adela Pankhurst and Annie Kenney.

== Early life and education ==
Morris was born on 9 April 1873 in Dolgellau, Merionethshire in Wales. She was the daughter of Reverend Samuel D. Morris, a Royal Navy chaplain. Morris grew up in Malta. Her father died while helping the sick on the flagship HMS Victoria when it had a collision with another warship and 358 crew members died (about half of Victoria's crew).

Morris returned to Wales with her mother and sister, Rose Adelaide Morris. She attended high school in Carmarthen in 1883 and passed the Trinity College London senior examinations in December 1888. She also passed the Royal Academy of Music, Swansea Centre senior division Honours for elements of music that year.

She went on to study medicine at the University College of Wales in Aberystwyth (examined by the University of London), with her preliminary scientific M.B. a second division pass in 1895. She completed her medical training at the London (RFH) Society of Medicine for Women, graduating with a 2nd division pass in 1896. She was the first female doctor educated from Aberystwyth.

== Medical career ==
Morris worked at the Great Ormond Street Children's Hospital in London, the North Devon Infirmary, and Bristol Royal Hospital for Sick Children and Women before becoming the first female Medical Inspector of School Children and a private practitioner in Bath.

She became the first School Medical Inspector in Bath and the first woman in this role, despite an interview question by one alderman on the council sub-committee, as to whether she would "inspect both boys and girls." She examined over 2,500 children in her first four months and found 200 with physical defects and 81 "mental defective cases." In her first annual report she was commended for "the assiduity with which she had performed her duties." Her published summary reports covered nutrition, dental care, physical and mental health, and appropriate growth and development examinations.

She undertook 'bacteriological' research at the Royal Mineral Water Hospital into 'the pain and misery' of rheumatoid arthritis, the origins of which were not well understood at the time. In 1909, Morris became the commandant of the Nursing Division of the local St John Ambulance Service, which provided nursing and medical aid at major public events such as the Royal Pageant. In 1910, she attended the training camp for the Women's Sick and Wounded Convoy Corp. under the War Office management at Studland Bay, near Swanage. She described the activities and praised the military discipline involved and said that "the training is exceedingly useful ... for all voluntary detachments, whether under St. John Ambulance or the Red Cross." She set and examined scientific studies at a Bathwick Ladies (girls) School, trained young people and parents in first aid and hygiene, was local secretary for The After Care Association for Poor Persons Discharged Recovered from Asylums for the Insane, and briefed the Bath Literary and Philosophical Association on the challenges of care for the "feeble minded."

In the 1910 report of the Marquis of Bath's event for the governing Committees of the Bath Centre of the St. John Ambulance Association and of the Bath Humane Society, when first aid (first responder) services were given their awards, Morris was on the platform with the Chairman of the St John Ambulance Association, General A. Terry. He praised the value of the ambulance service to the community in preventing suffering and saving lives at the Bath Pageant, and made a call for "men and women ... for ambulance and nursing work in connection with the great Territorial Army scheme." When Dr. Morris seconded the vote of thanks to General Terry, he noted it was the first time he had ever been formally thanked by a woman. However, there was a footnote reported in the press (not attributed), which said: "You a doctor! Why, nobody in their senses would employ you!" And the reply was reported as: "Perhaps not; but I'm going to be a doctor to lunatics." The following year, with Dr. Morris as leader, the Bath St John's Ambulance team were at Windsor Park ( in "D" camp hospital, at the right-hand side by Queen Anne's Gate) a very large event, with a reported 15,000 participants for the Review by the King.

In 1917, Dr. Morris's salary was noted as having been much less than her (male) successor who was to be paid the "doctors' trade union rate."

== Women's suffrage activism ==
Morris was one of the local women's suffrage leaders at the 1908 garden party at the Blathwayts', alongside Adela Pankhurst, Dorothy Pethick (sister of Emmeline Pethick-Lawrence), Annie Kenney and 230 other guests. The purpose of this event was to raise funds for the West of England women's suffrage movement. In 1910, she was among those named by one of the first female councillors in the country, Miss Sutton from Reading, in her address to the Bath Women's Local Government Association on "women's citizenship." She was also cited in a speech on church and politics at the Church League for Women's Suffrage.

In 1911, Morris hosted an 'At Home' at her house at 19 Gay Street, Bath, with joint honorary secretary of the local WSPU branch Mrs. Mansel to talk to nurses in preparation for the London Women's Sunday Procession. Morris spoke to a "crowded men's meeting" at Oddfellows Hall, Lacock, which "carried with enthusiasm a resolution calling on the Government to remove the sex disability. A strong feeling that women should receive the vote on the same terms as men was also shown.” Morris also spoke on "Legislation for the Feeble Minded." Also in 1911, she spoke to a combined audience of suffragists and her fellow Conservatives and Unionists at a joint meeting on the National Insurance Act 1911, which several speakers had noted as being "unjust" to women. She seconded the motion of the Bath and County Circle of the Conservative and Unionist Women's Franchise Association to write to Sir Charles Hunter, thanking him for support of the Conciliation Bill which introduced votes for some women.

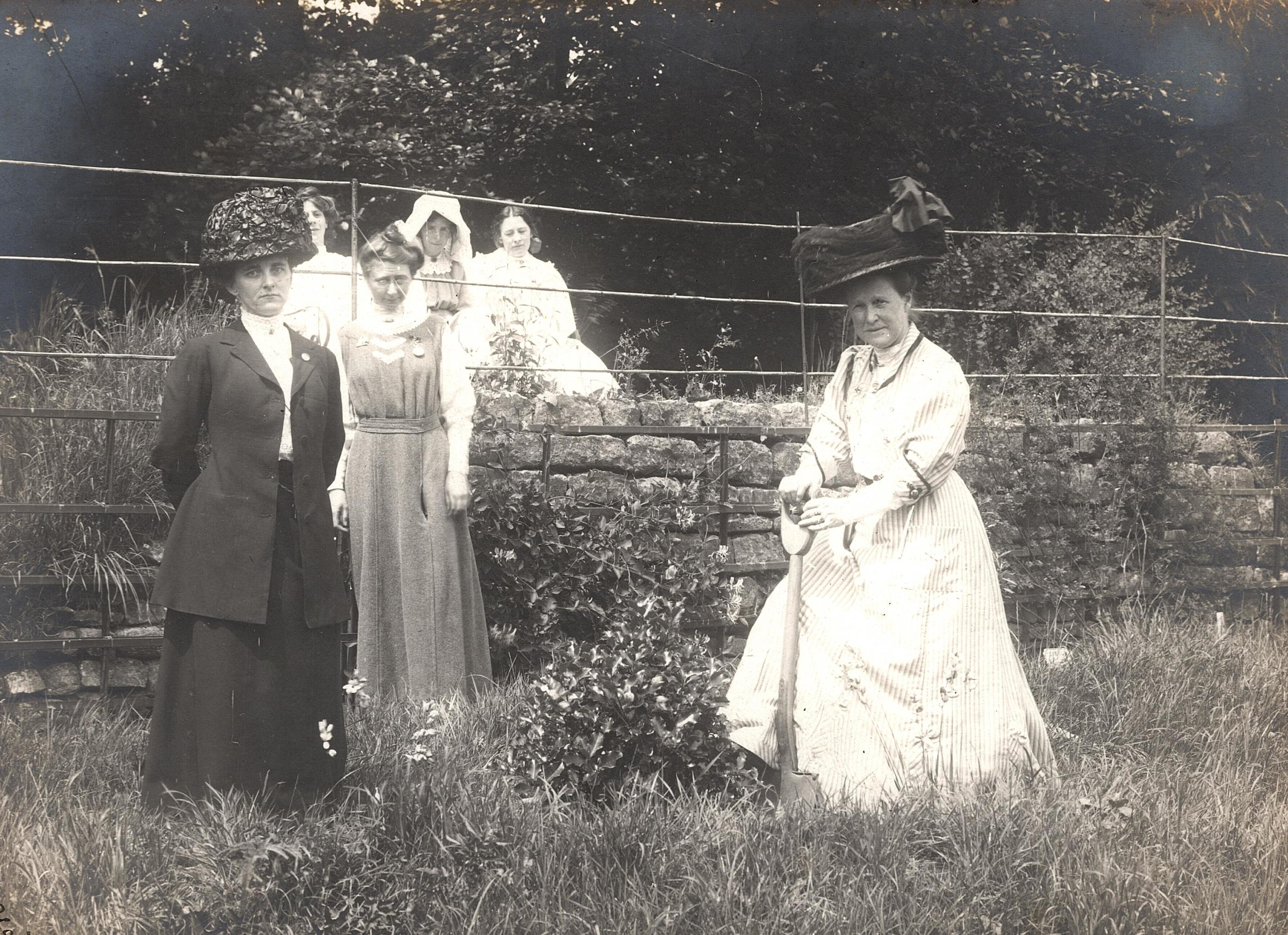
Dr. Mary Morris (on left) with Mary Blathwayt and Millicent Fawcett at Eagle House in Bath

Morris was invited to plant a tree in Annie's Arboretum at the Blathwayts' home, also known as the "Suffragettes' Rest," for her services to women's suffrage, and planted an Ilex aquifolium 'Laurifolia' on 20 February 1911. Morris was listed as a pardoned suffrage prisoner when WSPU militancy ceased at the start of World War One in 1914. Speaking at the Lansdown Women's Conservative Association a decade later, she was reported as claiming "never to have been a militant suffragette," prompting laughter from the large audience. She gained applause when she noted that women valued getting the vote more than men because they had struggled so hard to achieve it.

== Political and civic engagement ==
Morris was a "staunch" Conservative and a regular speaker at political campaigns locally or in Wales and at other civic events. In 1911, she was a part of the welcome party at the Bath carnival for overseas guests in the Victoria League, as well as for the annual rose show. At this time, she was already a member of the committee for Bath and Bristol University, which met in the Guildhall to discuss issues around establishing local further education centres.

== Death and tributes ==
Mary Morris died on 11 July 1925, and her funeral was attended by representative mourners including the Mayoress. A column and a half was dedicated to her funeral in the local paper. The donated flowers on the hearse overflowed onto another large carriage. Dr. Morris was described as "one of the best known medical practitioners" in the city, a Conservative, an accomplished speaker and "a great loss." One former patient noted that they had received fifteen years of free doctoring from her. Morris was buried in her former home town in Aberystwyth.

== See also ==
- Frances Hoggan
- Mary Elizabeth Phillips (physician)
- List of Welsh medical pioneers
