= Oldham (disambiguation) =

Oldham is a town in Greater Manchester, in northern England.

Oldham may also refer to:

== Places ==
- In Canada
  - Oldham, Nova Scotia, a community in Halifax
- In England
  - Administrative entities
    - Metropolitan Borough of Oldham, a current local government district of Greater Manchester, England
    - County Borough of Oldham, a former local government district of Lancashire, England, including some of Greater Manchester
    - OL postcode area or Oldham postcode area in England, including some of Greater Manchester
    - Prestwich-cum-Oldham, a former ecclesiastic parish of the hundred of Salford, Lancashire, England, in Greater Manchester
  - Constituencies
    - Oldham (UK Parliament constituency), a former parliamentary borough abolished 1950
    - Oldham East (UK Parliament constituency), a constituency abolished 1983
    - Oldham West (UK Parliament constituency), a constituency abolished 1997
    - Oldham East and Saddleworth (UK Parliament constituency), a current constituency of Greater Manchester
    - Oldham West and Royton (UK Parliament constituency), a current constituency of Greater Manchester
- In the United States
  - Oldham, Mississippi, an unincorporated community
  - Oldham, Missouri, an unincorporated community
  - Oldham, South Dakota, a small city
  - Oldham County, Kentucky
  - Oldham County, Texas

== Publications ==
- Oldham Advertiser, a weekly local newspaper in Oldham, England
- Oldham Evening Chronicle, a daily local newspaper in Oldham, England

== Sports ==
- Oldham R.L.F.C., a rugby league team based in Oldham, England
- Oldham Athletic A.F.C., an association football team based in Oldham, England

== Surname ==
- Oldham (surname)

== Transport ==
- Oldham Mumps railway station, a railway station in central Oldham
- Oldham Werneth railway station, a railway station in southern Oldham
- Oldham Loop Line, a heavy rail line in Greater Manchester
- Oldham Street, in the Northern Quarter of the City of Manchester, England

== Engineering ==
- Oldham Coupling, a type of shaft coupling used to accommodate large radial displacement between two shafts.

== See also ==
- Newham (disambiguation), a name formed by contrast with Oldham
