= John Lees =

John Lees may refer to:

- Sir John Lees, 1st Baronet (1737–1811), Secretary of Irish Post Office and Black Rod in Ireland
- John Lees (artist) (born 1943), American contemporary artist
- John Lees (bodybuilder) (1930–2021), English bodybuilder
- John Lees (inventor), English textile machinery inventor
- John Lees (politician) (c. 1740–1807), Canadian politician
- John Frederick Lees (1809–1867), British member of parliament for Oldham
- John Lees (footballer), English footballer for Derby County
- John Lees (gymnast) (1931–2008), Australian Olympic gymnast
- John Lees (walker), English record-breaking walker and journalist
- John Lees (musician), English musician who founded the rock band Barclay James Harvest

== See also ==
- Jack Lees (1884–1940), MP for Derbyshire, England
- John Lees-Jones (1887–1966), British politician
