= Charles Leigh =

Charles Leigh may refer to:

- Charles Leigh (American football) (1945–2006), National Football League running back
- Charles Leigh (physician) (1662–1701), English physician and naturalist
- Charles Leigh (British Army officer) (1748–1815), British general
- Charles Leigh (librarian) (1871–1940), English academic librarian
- Charles Leigh (merchant) (died 1605), English merchant and voyager
- Charles Leigh (1686–1749), British member of parliament for Bedfordshire, Warwick, and Higham Ferrers
- Charles Leigh (died 1836), British member of parliament for New Ross

== See also ==
- Charles Lee (disambiguation)
