= Horace Dixon (bishop) =

Anglican bishop

Horace Henry Dixon CBE (known informally as Jimmy) (1 August 1869 – 8 November 1964) was a British priest in the Church of England who became Dean of Brisbane and then assistant bishop of Brisbane. He was also the founding headmaster of The Southport School.

== Early life ==
Dixon was born in 1869 in Cambridge, the son of Thomas Dixon, a bookseller, and his wife Lucy (née Eastgate).

== Career ==
Dixon was initially a teacher, working as a housemaster at Warkworth House, Cambridge, for three years. He graduated through Fitzwilliam Hall, Cambridge, in 1892. He was ordained deacon in 1893 and priest in 1894, both at St Alban's Abbey. He served curacies in Epping (1893–94), St Michael and All Angels, Walthamstow (1894–97), and St Matthew's, Burnley (1898–99), and worked briefly in the East End.

He was recruited for service in Queensland by Bishop William Webber, and arrived in the colony in 1899, being assigned to Southport, then a parish covering an immense distance from Beenleigh to the New South Wales border. In 1901 he founded The Southport School, and was headmaster until 1929. In 1903 the schoolboys nicknamed him 'Jimmy', after the Aboriginal outlaw, Jimmy Governor, who had been hanged in 1901. He relinquished the incumbency of St Peter's, Southport in 1905.

Dixon was an honorary canon of St John's Cathedral, Brisbane from 1919. In 1930 he was appointed canon residentiary and in 1931 Dean, but relinquished that office on becoming bishop coadjutor in 1932. He retired as assistant bishop in 1961, having been appointed CBE the previous year.

== Personal life ==
He married first, in 1897, Florence Marie Godbold. He and his first wife had two sons, Horace and Cecil. He married secondly, in 1936, Enid Rose Morgan-Jones. He died in 1964, aged 95, and was buried in Lutwyche Cemetery.
