= Ainslie Sheil =

- Born: Ainslie Glenister Ross Sheil; 4 November 1933 (age 93) Melbourne, Victoria
- School: The Southport School
- University: Oxford (Rhodes scholar)
- Notable relative(s): Dr Meredith Foxton (sister), Dr Glenister Sheil (brother), Dr Beverley Abbott (sister), Dr Gregor Sheil (brother)
- Occupation(s): Surgeon (Professor of Transplant Surgery Royal Prince Alfred Hospital, NSW)

Rugby union career
- Position: fly-half
International career
Years	Team	Apps	(Points)
1956	Wallabies	1	(0)

Ainslie Glenister Ross Sheil AO (born 4 November 1933) was a rugby union player who represented Australia.

Sheil, a fly-half, was born in Melbourne, Victoria and claimed 1 international rugby cap for Australia.

== Early life and education ==
Ainslie Sheil was born in 1933 and entered The Southport School in 1947 as a member of Delpratt House. During his time at the School he was an accomplished scholar and sportsman, winning Dux of the School, the Chelmsford Cup and the Founder's Prize. Ross was also a School Prefect, House Captain, member of the 1st XV Rugby, 1st XI Cricket, 1st IV Tennis, as well as being a member of the School's Swimming and Athletics teams.

Following his graduation from The Southport School in 1950, Ross began his medical degree at the University of Queensland, where he continued to build upon his already accomplished sporting profile. As a member of St. John's College, he represented the College in Cricket, Rugby, Athletics, Swimming, Tennis and Rowing. He was awarded a College Blue in 1951 in recognition of his outstanding contribution. As well as representing St. John's College, Ross also represented the University of Queensland in Rugby Union at a time when the University of Queensland won the Premiership six times during the seven-year period from 1952 – 1957.

Ross also represented the University in Athletics and Tennis for which he was awarded a University Blue in 1952. Whilst continuing his studies, Ross was also a member of the Queensland XV from 1952 – 1957. He was selected for the Australian Universities XV which played New Zealand in 1954, Japan in 1956 and the Australian Barbarian XV in 1957. His one and only National cap came in 1956 when he was selected for Australia against South Africa in Sydney. He acquitted himself well, however dislocated his shoulder and so was unavailable for the second test.

Following the 1957 season, Ross was awarded a Rhodes scholarship to Balliol College, Oxford University, where he continued his studies in Medicine. While at University, Ross continued to pursue his passion for both rugby and tennis and was awarded a Full Blue for both in 1958.

== Career ==
In 1962, Sheil was admitted to the Royal College of Surgeons and in 1966, was admitted to the Royal College of Australian Surgeons.

At Oxford University he studied surgery and undertook pioneering research into organ transplantation. After furthering this work in Boston, Sheil returned to Australia where he specialised in Vascular surgery and was a pioneer in transplantation surgery. He was appointed Professor of Transplant Surgery at Sydney University and formed part of the Sydney University Renal Transplant Group, which in 1967 embarked on a community based cadaveric renal transplant program for NSW (Sheil, Stewart, Johnson et al. 1969). He headed the Transplantation Unit at Royal Prince Alfred Hospital and became head of the Australian National Liver Transplant Unit, and in fact carried out the first liver transplant in NSW. He is now Emeritus Professor. He was appointed Officer of the Order of Australia General division (AO) 1992 for services to surgery particularly clinical and research transplantation
