= Sarah Lees =

English Liberal politician, activist and philanthropist (1842–1935)

Dame Sarah Anne Lees DBE DStJ

Mayor of Oldham
- In office 9 November 1910 – 1911
- Preceded by: William Schofield
- Succeeded by: Frederick Graham Isherwood

Councillor for Hollinwood, Oldham
- In office 1907–1919
- Succeeded by: Marjory Lees

Personal details
- Born: Sarah Anne Buckley; 13 November 1842 Oldham, Lancashire, England
- Died: 14 April 1935 (aged 92) Oldham, Lancashire, England
- Party: Liberal Party
- Spouse: Charles Edward Lees
- Children: Dorothy Lees; Marjorie Lees
- Relatives: John Frederick Lees
- Occupation: Politician; Activist; Philanthropist

Dame Sarah Anne Lees DBE DStJ (née Buckley; 13 November 1842 – 14 April 1935) of Werneth Park, Oldham, was an English Liberal politician, activist, and philanthropist who was the first female councillor elected in Lancashire (1907–19) and the first female Mayor of Oldham (1910–11), only the second woman in England to hold such a position.

== Career ==
Lees was born in Mossley, Greater Manchester, in 1842. On 30 July 1874, she married Charles Edward Lees JP (1840–1894) of Werneth Park in Oldham, Lancashire, a relative of the Oldham MP John Frederick Lees.

After the Qualification of Women Act 1907 was passed by Parliament, Lees became the first woman to be elected to Oldham's Town Council, representing Hollinwood Ward. Already in her 60s, Lees was named the first female Freeman of the Borough of Oldham in November 1909. She became Mayor of Oldham the following year, only the second woman to be installed with that title in the United Kingdom.

Lees was involved with various local institutions: she was President of the Oldham Royal Infirmary, a Governor of Hulme Grammar School, a Member of the Court of the University of Manchester, and also served as Chairman of the Oldham Branch of the League of Nations.

Lees died, aged 92, at Werneth Park, Oldham, on 14 April 1935. Her daughter, Marjory Lees (1878–1970), presented the estate to the people of Oldham in 1936 to form the present public Werneth Park.

== Honours ==
Lees was awarded an Honorary Doctor of Law (LLD) degree by the University of Manchester in July 1914. In 1916, she was appointed a Lady of Grace (DStJ) of the Order of St John of Jerusalem. On 25 August 1917, she was appointed a Dame Commander of the Order of the British Empire (DBE) in recognition of her services during World War I.

The Dame Sarah Lees Memorial erected in Werneth Park in 1937, was designed and made by the local artist and sculptor Williams Hargreaves Whitehead.
