= Dave Duley =

New Zealand rugby union player (born 1976)

- Full name: David Roy Duley
- Born: 26 December 1976 (age 49) Matamata, New Zealand
- School: The Southport School
- Occupation: Horse farm owner

Rugby union career
- Position: Lock
Provincial / State sides
Years	Team	Apps	(Points)
2001–02	Bay of Plenty	20	(15)
2003–04	Waikato	9	(0)
2007–08	Counties Manukau	13	(0)
Super Rugby
Years	Team	Apps	(Points)
2004	Chiefs	4	(0)

David Roy Duley (born 26 December 1976) is a New Zealand former professional rugby union player.

Duley was born in Matamata and grew up on the Gold Coast from the age of 12, attending The Southport School. He partnered future Wallaby Nathan Sharpe in the second row of the school's first XV and toured with the Australian Schoolboys representative team, then gained further national honours playing for Australian Colts.

A former Queensland Reds squad member, Duley got recruited by Gordon Tietjens to play for the Bay of Plenty, where he spent two seasons, before moving on to Waikato in 2003. He made four appearances for the Chiefs during the 2004 Super 12 season, three of which came as a starting lock. At the end of 2004, Duley linked up with Welsh club Scarlets, qualifying as a local signing due to his grandfather being from Wrexham. He competed for Edinburgh in 2006. After returning to New Zealand in 2007, Duley finished his career with Counties Manukau.

Duley is the owner of Landsdowne Park, a thoroughbred horse farm in Ōhaupō.
