= John Wolfe (rugby union) =

- Full name: John Keith Wolfe
- Born: 25 March 1943 (age 83) Sydney, NSW, Australia
- School: Anglican Church Grammar School; The Southport School
- University: University of Queensland

Rugby union career
- Position: Fullback / Winger
Provincial / State sides
Years	Team	Apps	(Points)
- Queensland
International career
Years	Team	Apps	(Points)
1963	Australia		

John Keith Wolfe (born 25 March 1943) is an Australian former international rugby union player.

Raised on the Gold Coast, Wolfe picked up rugby union during his time as a pupil at Anglican Church Grammar School, before playing in the 1st XV with The Southport School, where he completed his last two years of school.

Wolfe, a fullback and winger, played his first-grade rugby for the University of Queensland. He toured New Zealand with Queensland in 1963 and subsequently won a place on the Wallabies squad for that year's tour of South Africa, selected as a winger. Featuring in seven uncapped tour matches, Wolfe had been set for a cap in the second Test against the Springboks at Newlands, after John Williams contracted bronchitis, but broke his right foot in a training accident and had to pull out. He was a member of the Queensland side which toured Fiji in 1965.

== See also ==
- List of Australia national rugby union players
