= Werneth Park =

Public park in Oldham, Greater Manchester

- Location within Greater Manchester
- Type: Public park
- Coordinates: 53°31′58″N 2°7′49″W
- Area: 9 hectares (22 acres)
- Operator: Oldham Metropolitan Borough Council
- Open: Open, year-round
- Status: Existing
- Website: Werneth Park

Werneth Park is a public park in Oldham, Greater Manchester, England, including a Grade II listed community centre, music rooms, Dame Sarah Lees Memorial, gardens and sports facilities.

== History ==
=== Werneth Hall and Park ===
Werneth Park formed part of the historic Werneth Hall estate (the lands owned by the lord of the manor of Oldham) from the Middle Ages until around 1844 when the triangular plot of land which is now known as the park was separated from the rest of the estate (Werneth Hall) and the Platt, Lees and Radcliffe families bought the plots of land.

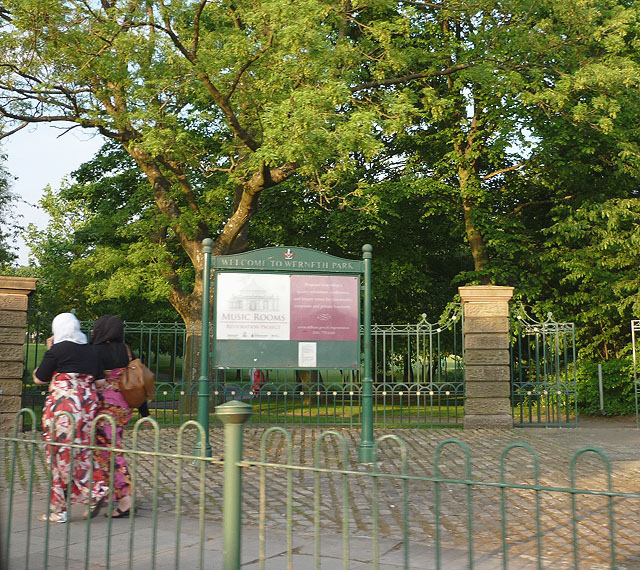
Entrance to Werneth Park, Oldham

=== Werneth Park and Platt House ===
During the late-19th century, each of the Platt, Lees and Radcliffe families built a "mill town mansion" overlooking the park's landscape and developed their grounds as gardens.

Later, the Lees family bought the other families' portions and (with the exception of their own house (known as "Werneth Park") and the music room and conservatory of the Platts' House) demolished all the other buildings to become the sole owners of the park.

After the death of the philanthropist Dame Sarah Lees in 1935, her daughter, Miss Marjory Lees, gave the park to the people of Oldham.

== Dame Sarah Lees Memorial ==
This monument to the local philanthropist and public figure, Dame Sarah Lees (1842–1935), was erected in her honour by the townspeople of Oldham in 1937.

She was the first woman councillor elected for Oldham Council and also the first woman councillor to be elected in Lancashire in 1907. She was later the second female mayor in the country when she became Mayor of Oldham in 1910.

== Community centre ==
Werneth Park Community Centre
- Interactive map of Werneth Park Community Centre
- Type: Adult education and community centre
- Location: Werneth, Greater Manchester, England

History
- Built: c. 1847–1849

Site notes
- Architectural style: Italianate
- Governing body: Oldham Metropolitan Borough Council

Listed Building – Grade II
- Official name: Werneth Park Adult Education Centre
- Designated: 8 March 1993
- Reference no.: 1201654

Werneth Park Adult Education Centre was originally the private residence of the Lees family. Since 1936, it has been adapted for use as a community centre with the building extended to add a rear wing to house the Natural History Collection.

== Music rooms ==
The music rooms were originally the private residence of the Platt family, and were used for music concerts for many years. Plans were announced for restoration of the music rooms in 2010.

== Recreation and sports facilities ==
The park houses a bowling green, tennis courts, five-a-side football areas, children's playground and natural play area, Trim Trail, and car parks.
