= Qualification of Women (County and Borough Councils) Act 1907 =

Act of the Parliament of the United Kingdom

Qualification of Women (County and Borough Councils) Act 1907 (Note: Section 2(1).)
- Act of Parliament
- Parliament of the United Kingdom
- Long title: An Act to amend the Law relating to the capacity of Women to be elected and act as Members of County or Borough Councils.
- Citation: 7 Edw. 7. c. 33
- Territorial extent: England and Wales (Note: Section 2(2).)

Dates
- Royal assent: 28 August 1907
- Commencement: 28 August 1907 (Note: The Acts of Parliament (Commencement) Act 1793.)
- Repealed: England and Wales: 1 April 1934; London: 1 January 1940
Other legislation
Amends	London Government Act 1899
Repealed by	England and Wales: Local Government Act 1933; London: London Government Act 1939

Status: Repealed

Text of statute as originally enacted

The Qualification of Women (County and Borough Councils) Act 1907 (7 Edw. 7. c. 33) was an act of the Parliament of the United Kingdom that clarified the right of certain women ratepayers to be elected to Borough and County Councils in England and Wales. It followed years of uncertainty and confusion, which included challenges in the courts when women first tried to stand for the London County Council.

Women had been elected to separate boards dealing with the Poor Law and the Elementary Education Act 1870 and were entitled to serve on the new urban and rural district councils from 1894. Women had lost their influence on education boards when the free-standing boards were absorbed into the newly established councils. Women had also lost places when towns grew and obtained Borough status. The 1907 act which was seen as a victory for the Women's Local Government Society gave widows and unmarried women the right to stand anywhere in local government.

Six women were elected in 1907: Elizabeth Garrett Anderson in Aldeburgh, Edith Sutton in Reading, Sarah Elizabeth Woodward in Bewdley, Sophia Merivale in Oxford, Mrs Dove in Wycombe, and Gwenllian Morgan in Brecon. Marjory Lees was elected as an alderman in Oldham at a by-election shortly after the regular elections. Numbers of councillors gradually increased, with Mrs Hughes in Oxford and Margaret Ashton in Manchester winning seats in 1908, Eleanor Rathbone in Liverpool, Helen Hope in Bath, Miss Coulcher in Ipswich and Mrs Chapman in Worthing in 1909, Ada Newman in Walsall, Elizabeth Bannister in Southend and Maud Burnett in Tynemouth in 1910, and Ellen Hume in Pinsent and Marjorie Pugh in Birmingham, Mrs Redford in Manchester and Alison Ogilvy in Godalming in 1911.

== Subsequent developments ==
The whole act was repealed for England and Wales, excluding London, by section 307(1)(b) of, and the fourth part of the eleventh schedule to, the Local Government Act 1933 (23 & 24 Geo. 5. c. 22), which came into force on 1 April 1934.

The act was repealed for London by section 207 of, and the eighth schedule to, the London Government Act 1939 (2 & 3 Geo. 6. c. 40), which came into force on 1 January 1940. The 1939 act specified the Representation of the People Act 1918 (7 & 8 Geo. 5. c. 64) as the criteria for voting.
