= Edith Sutton =

First woman councillor in England, Mayor of Reading and suffragist

Edith Mary Sutton
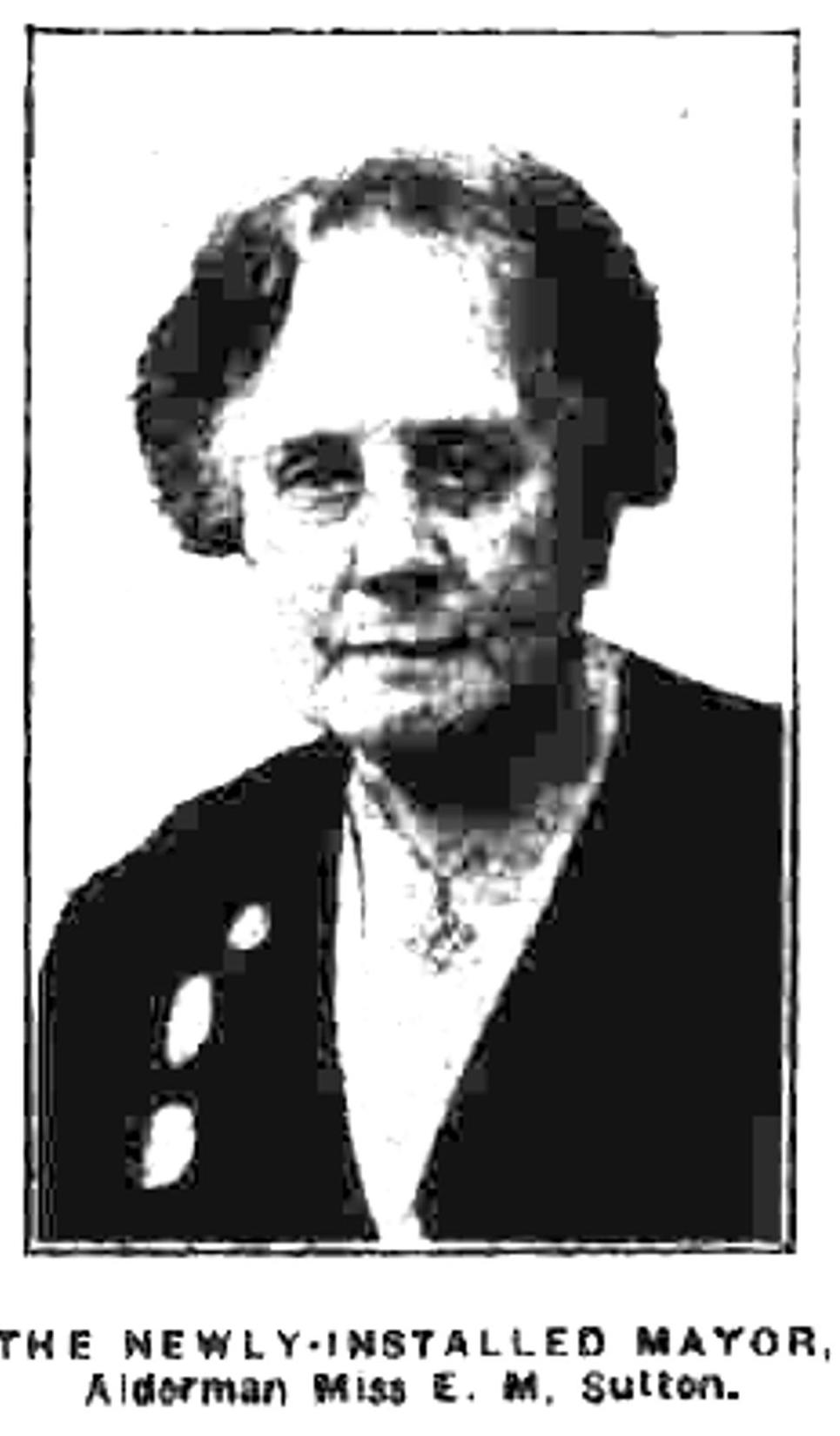
- Newly installed mayor, alderman Miss E. M. Sutton (10 November 1933)
- Born: 1862
- Died: 1957 (aged 94–95)
- Known for: First female councillor, mayor, alderman of Reading, Berkshire
- Movement: suffragist

Edith Mary Sutton (1862–1957) was the first woman to become a councillor in England, the first female mayor in Reading, and a suffragist.

== Biography ==
Sutton was a member of the wealthy Sutton Seeds family of Reading. In 1901, she was elected as a "Moderate" to Reading School Board; fourth out of seventeen candidates. In the next year, she was involved in establishing a Navvy Mission, for religious instruction and social "enjoyments" for 400–500 workmen who were to be in the town for at least a year building branch lines.

When electoral law changed and women could be elected in municipal elections, Sutton was returned unopposed for Reading as the first female councillor.

== Involvement in women's suffrage movement ==
Dr. Mary Cruickshank was in the chair when the Reading Suffrage Society was formed as part of the National Union of Women's Suffrage Societies in 1906. Although Sutton was absent from the meeting, she was elected vice president. The Reading Observer also reported her as sending a message:

I must confess that at first I did shrink from taking any definite step in this matter of women's suffrage until I realised the cowardice of letting others fight for a position one would be ready enough to step into when the fighting was over.

In 1907, Sutton was to propose a vote of thanks to Millicent Fawcett at the end of a turbulent meeting, during which Mrs Fawcett had been constantly interrupted, by a rowdy element of young men at the back of the hall shouting out, or making noises with hooters, and although present, the police had not intervened. Councillor Sutton quietened the room by simply rising to speak, and referred in her remarks to the trust that the people of Reading had put in herself to serve on the Council, as confirming that women were trusted with voting. She was reported as saying: "Women wanted votes... or at least some of us do." And she was heard to affirm that when women were given the vote, that "it would be a responsibility which many of them would feel to be a very serious one, which they would regard in a very serious light, as she did her municipal vote". She claimed that women would "rise to their responsibility and make good use of it".

Sutton headed a group of 70 suffragists from Reading (including working women, teachers, nurses, doctors and members of the Primrose League) who joined the London NUWSS Suffrage March on 13 June 1908 to the Albert Hall. A picture was taken as they set off by train. It was reported that the Reading banner was one of the largest, decorated with the five female heads from the city coat of arms as part of the vast procession of 10,000 participants.

=== Dealing with opposition ===
In November 1908, following an anti-suffragist event by Sir Edward Clarke, K.C., Sutton spoke at a public meeting which had attracted hecklers, even when she claimed that the women's suffrage movement was based on religious principles, in a Christian "ideal of a social state, every member of the body must do its part and every part must be healthy and sound if the body corporate was to perform the functions for which it was created" (based on 1 Corinthians 12:12–26). She was arguing that women's enfranchisement would be good for the whole community but reforms would take time. Despite opposition, her motion was carried that "Parliamentary franchise should be granted to women as a matter of justice and expediency". A year later at Tilehurst, Sutton and suffragist speakers were heckled by young men creating a commotion, with musical instruments, shouting and someone released a mouse into the crowd as she stood up to speak, the resulting mayhem disrupted her throughout. She was reported as saying she hoped they had "worked off their hysteria". In speaking against suffragette "stoning" she reminded them that "men in Bristol did £14,000 of damage at the time of the Reform Bill" and told the hecklers to "Put that in your pipes and smoke it!". Speaking in Basingstoke and in Bath, Sutton asked for women to have an equal place in civic society, reflecting "the best civic life based on the best religious life" and supported the stance of Dr Mary Morris, Bath's first woman inspector of schools and fellow suffragist.

=== Gaining support ===
By 1910, when the editor of The Common Cause (the NUWSS newspaper), Helena Swanwick attended their meeting, Sutton said that the calm and persistent influence of their society was gaining support for the right of women to vote. Sutton could quote a campaign survey of all 1,057 women householders in Reading, finding 1,046 signed for women's enfranchisement.

Councillor Sutton put a proposal to the Reading Council on 5 July 1911, seconded by Councillor E. P. Colber, for the Borough to write formally to the Government in support of the women's franchise bill. The item was debated but ruled as "party political" and outwith the Council's competent business. A letter in the press stated that in the debate there was a clear majority of councillors in favour of Miss Sutton's proposal and, if voted on, would have passed; 80 other town councils sent such a letter of support. In 1912, Sutton wrote to local MP and Solicitor (Attorney) General Sir Rufus Isaac as reported in The London Standard referring to the "Swedish model" of enfranchising householders and their wives. In Gloucester she was supporting Harold Baillie-Weaver of the Men's League for Women's Suffrage explaining the useful role of women on councils despite having to be single householders to stand for election, asking: "what if only single men were allowed to stand for election?" Sutton was heckled by Labour supporters asking for universal adult suffrage to extend the vote to all men and women on the same terms, rather than to enfranchise women first.

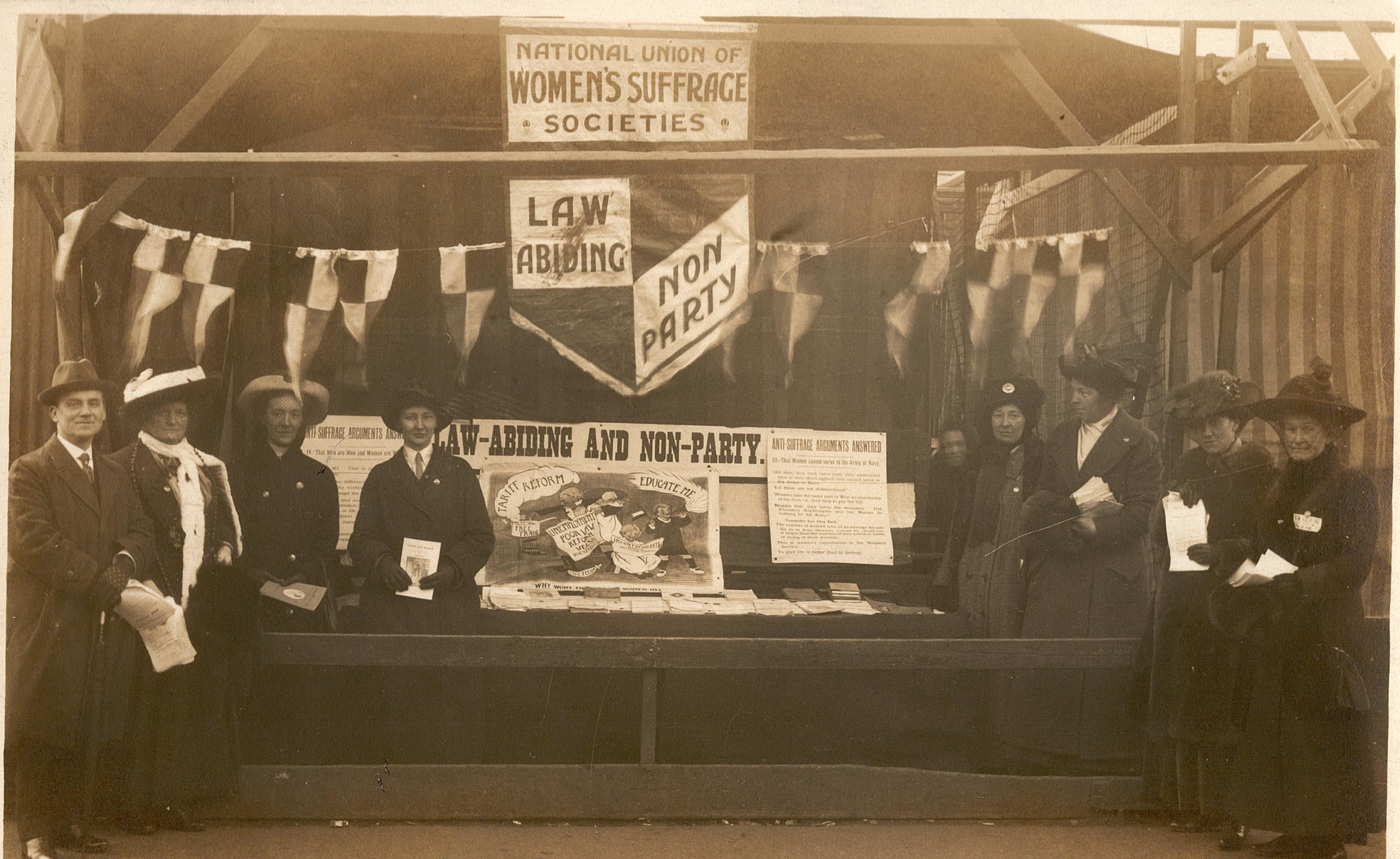
Suffrage pilgrims stall during the NUWSS Pilgrimage

In July 1913, Sutton welcomed the West Country "pilgrims", about a hundred people, supplemented by members from the Reading, Crowthorne, Ascot and Wokingham women's suffrage groups who marched to Reading Market Place where the audience were said to be 3000 in total "mostly orderly and interested". The emphasis was on the law-abiding nature of the suffragist campaign. This NUWSS Great Pilgrimage, had headed on agreed routes to London, gathering support and getting hospitality from local society groups like hers en route, growing at the end to a total of 50,000 people, who gathered peacefully in Hyde Park.

Prior to the 1913 by-elections, Sutton was holding open air meetings, growing in attendance and "everywhere friendly and sympathetic" after the pilgrimage visit, and reported "a complete change of feeling on the suffrage question being reported to have taken place amongst factory hands in the last twelve months". She spoke in Leeds on the role of women in local government and the need to get men's support.

Sutton was President of the Reading NUWSS branch in 1915. And in 1916 the society continued in charitable work for a day nursery and women's war hospitals.

=== Woman's Council ===
Sutton was chosen as the first Woman's Council Regional Treasurer in 1918, when Anna Munro convened a meeting in which various local women's suffrage groups merged, affiliating 'The Women's Freedom League, the National Union of Women Workers, the National Union of Women's Suffrage Societies, Adult Schools, the Workers' Educational Association, the Women's Co-operative Guild, the Railway Women's Guild, the Independent Labour Party, the British Socialist Party, the Guild of Social Welfare, the National Federation of Women Teachers, the Class Teachers' Association, the Tailoresses' Union, Park Institute.'

== Health and welfare ==
Throughout her career, Sutton demonstrated her concern for the health and welfare of the local populace. In 1907, she was appointed to a Sub Committee of the Education Department to look into the underfeeding of children. Sweated labour and the "grinding of the faces of the poor" was the subject of a talk she gave to the Christian Social Union in Reading in 1908.

In 1910, she spoke of her work on the Old Age Pensions Committee of the local council while at the Women’s Congress in London.

As an active member of the Borough Council, she was also the first woman appointed to the Watch Committee, and served on the Sanitary Committee and sub-committees dealing with the Housing of the Working Classes Act, the Children’s Act, and the First Offenders' Act.

At the Reading Women's Suffrage Society Annual Meeting in 1915, Sutton not only reported on the popularity of the organisation's nursery provision, but that 1,314 meals were provided to hungry children in association with the National Relief Fund.

When a Tuberculosis Dispensary Care Association was formed in Reading in 1916, Sutton became its first chairman; she was still chair in 1933. Two years after that, Sutton was the chairman of the Special Needs Committee of the Royal Berkshire Hospital which raised money to provide equipment for the hospital.

Sutton was one of the speakers at a meeting in Reading in 1923 supporting the "Thirteen Counties Scheme", which supported women and girls financially after their release from Holloway Jail.

When awarded the Freedom of Reading in 1954, her many years as member and later chairman of the committee responsible for the care of the 'mentally defective' was formally acknowledged. Her involvement had started in 1914, when she was appointed to a committee set up by Reading Council in response to the Mental Deficiency Act passed by Parliament the preceding year.

Sutton was quoted as summing up her approach in 1922 – that the line in which women would work in public life was "the human line".

== Roles in policing and justice ==
Sutton became the first woman in the country to be appointed to a Watch Committee, just two years after her election to the council in 1909. She was then appointed to a new sub-committee set up to look into suitable detention places for children and young people. This role expanded in 1914 when she became a Visitor of the Place of Detention, as provided for in the 1908 Children’s Act.

Barnett House in Oxford was the location in 1916 of Sutton’s lecture on the work of the Police and Watch Committee, where she outlined the long history of such committees, but noted only three women in the whole country were currently appointed to serve. She ended by "praising very highly the work of women police". While speaking in the Metropole Assembly Rooms in Hastings six years later, she noted that there had been two women police in Reading at the start of the war who has been the "best friends of the girls and the men stationed in the town" Sutton served on the Reading Watch Committee continuously for thirty years.

Sutton was also appointed Reading's first female Justice of the Peace in 1920, and served until 1940, by which time she was chairman of the magistrates.

== Educational responsibilities ==
Sutton's earliest formal educational role was when she stood for the local school board election in 1901. In an election meeting speech, she "hoped that, though a woman, she would show that she was a practical woman".

In 1907 she was appointed as Chairman of the School Management Sub-Committee of Reading's Education Committee, and only two years later became a member of the governing body of Reading High School.

Sutton was invited to deliver an address on women's work on public bodies to the Yorkshire Ladies' Council of Education in Leeds in 1913, in which she highlighted "how much women are needed and can do in municipal work". The following year she was one of the three delegates from Reading to the National Union of Teachers AGM in Lowestoft.

Sutton was the only Reading councillor to be sent to London in 1916 as representative to the Conference of the Association of Education Committees; in 1933 she was nominated by Reading Education Committee and five others to serve on the executive committee of the same organisation,

During her speech at the Abbey School (Reading) prize-giving ceremony in 1916, Sutton stated that no longer should girls' "aim and characteristic" be self-repression but instead "self-expression" and that their aim should be the "fullest and best they could possibly be".

Sutton was appointed vice chair of the Reading Education Committee in 1918, and was still carrying out the same responsibility in 1938. In the former year she was also appointed to the county council (Berkshire) Education Committee.

She was in distinguished company in the platform party at the Reading & District Teachers’ Conference in 1920. The conference speakers included Lena Ashwell (who spoke on the subject of children's self-expression), and the R Hon H. A. L. Fisher, whose topic was the value of history to children.

In 1928 Reading Education Committee appointed her as its representative manager on the governing body of the Greycoat Foundation (Queen Anne’s School Caversham) and by 1930 she was chairman of the board of governors of Kendrick Girls’ School.

== Civic career ==
Sutton became the first female councilor in England in 1907, representing Battle Ward. In the 1930s, she become first alderman (1931) and then mayor (1933), and moved from an independent to Labour and became the second Labour and first woman mayor in Reading. Sutton was also made a Freeman of Reading in 1954 in recognition of her 38 years' civic service.

Sutton lived until she was 95 years of age, dying in Reading in 1957, and leaving £24,600.
