= George Oldham =

George Oldham may refer to:

- G. Ashton Oldham (George Ashton Oldham, 1877–1963), American bishop, 1929–1949
- George Oldham (architect), British architect
- George Oldham (footballer) (1920–1993), English footballer, 1938–1947
