= Caleb Brown =

Australian rugby union player (born 1987)

- Born: Caleb Brown; 8 March 1987 (age 39) Gold Coast, Queensland, Australia
- Height: 183 cm (6 ft 0 in)
- Weight: 95 kg (14 st 13 lb)
- School: The Southport School

Rugby union career
- Position: Wing
Youth career
- Gold Coast Breakers
Provincial / State sides
Years	Team	Apps	(Points)
2005, 2006, 2007 & 2008	Gold Coast Breakers	16	(45)
Super Rugby
Years	Team	Apps	(Points)
2006, 2007 & 2008	Queensland Reds	10	(5)
National sevens team
Years	Team		Comps
2008	Australia		IRB Sevens

Caleb Brown (born 8 March 1987, in Gold Coast, Australia) is a former Australian rugby union player who played on the wing for the Queensland Reds in the international Super 14 competition. Brown has also represented the Australian U21 team.

Brown was contracted by the Reds straight from The Southport School in January 2005, the first schoolboy to make such a move since Elton Flatley a decade before. He has represented QLD in the S14 10 times and represented QLD in other comps 16 times amassing an impressive 9 tries.

Brown showed impressive qualities in his debut year in 2006 and went on to play a significant part of the QLD team during the Australian Provincial Championship. Touted as a future Wallaby there has been mention of possibly making the Wallabies for the 2007 RWC.

Brown also represented Australia on the IRB Sevens circuit in 2008 playing in Hong Kong, Australia, England and Scotland of that year.

The Western Force then signed Brown to a two-year deal in 2008. Brown joined the WA side looking to add to his 11 Super Rugby caps after three seasons with the Reds, signing on until the end of 2010.

Brown went on the Force's development tour to UK and Europe of 2008. However, due to a recurring hamstring injury he sustained during that tour, he retired from all forms of rugby in 2008 at the age of 21.
