= Henry John King =

Australian composer

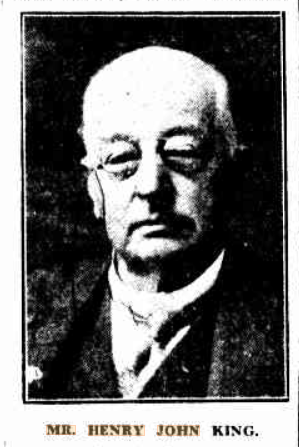
- Henry John King 1933

Background information
- Born: 1 January 1855; Van Diemen's Land
- Died: 27 June 1934
- Genres: Romantic, Classical, Spiritual
- Occupation(s): Composer, Musician, Conductor, Organist, Music Teacher
- Instrument(s): Organ, Choir, Piano, Violin
- Years active: 1880-1930

Henry John King (1855–1934) was an Australian composer, conductor, and organist.

Born in Emerald Hill (now South Melbourne), Victoria, King was the son of English settlers from Tasmania. His father, also named Henry John King, was a respected musician.

King married Mary Ann Hutchens, with whom he had two children: Harold Ernest Justiman King and Ilma Valerie Madeline King. The marriage ended in a highly publicised divorce in 1887.

He later married Elizabeth Halford; they had a daughter, Norah Yvonne Sylvia King (1902–1976), and were buried together in Southport.

King was organist at St Mark's Cathedral in Melbourne and later served as choirmaster and organist at The Southport School in Queensland for nine years, retiring in March 1933.

He was a frequent adjudicator at musical competitions, including the Gympie Eisteddfod and the Bathurst Musical and Literary Competitions.

One of his cantatas was selected for the 1888 International Centennial Exhibition in Melbourne.

A devout Protestant, King was also known for his academic interest in the humanities.

== Works ==
- Alternatives
- Centennial Cantata
- Te Deum Laudamus and Jubilate Deo : set to music in the key of D
- Little Bird
- The children's Eucharist : the Office for the Holy Communion : set in the key of F
- The Office for the Holy Communion set to music in the key of D / by Henry John King
- Benedictus
- Wilt thou be mine for ever love / lyrics by Russell Blackman
- Four works for piano and violin
- Album of four song on funereal themes
