= George Oldham (architect) =

British architect

George Oldham is a British architectural designer and member of the Council of the Royal Institute of British Architects (RIBA).

== Background ==
Oldham was previously city architect for Newcastle and a board member for Architects Registration Board (ARB), he currently runs his own practice and is a consultant to Know Hotel & Leisure Ltd. Oldham was previously Director of Professional Practice at Newcastle University.

Oldham resigned from his position on the ARB board in 2012. In April 2013 he was found guilty of professional misconduct after sending an email critical of ethnic minority candidates for elections to the board. He described the verdict as "completely unjust" and planned to appeal. He was later given a reprimand but, not being ARB registered, could no longer describe himself as an 'architect'. Amanda Baillieu, editor of Building Design, described the charges as "patently ridiculous" and accused the ARB of "lording it over the profession like a star chamber".

He was elected as a National Council Member to the RIBA Council from 1 September 2014.

== Notable projects ==
Oldham has two projects listed in the Northumberland Buildings of England by Nikolaus Pevsner; the Newcastle College Art and Design building, Ryehill (1987) and Minories Sheltered Housing, Jesmond Road (1986).

== Publications ==
- Following the Fairways: A Distinguished Companion to the Golf Courses of Great Britain and Ireland, Nicholas Edmund and George Oldham. Kensington West Productions Ltd; 14th Revised edition (7 Sep 2001)
- "Today's Golfer" New Courses Guide, George Oldham and Douglas Eaton. Club for Europe Publications Ltd (1 Dec 1998)
