= Charles Oldham =

Charles Oldham may refer to:

- Charles Oldham (naturalist) (1868–1942), English naturalist
- Charles Oldham (politician) (1863–1935), Australian politician
- Charles Thomas Oldham, English actor
- Charles Aemilius Oldham (1831–1869), Irish geologist who worked in India
- Charles Hubert Oldham (1859–1926), Irish economics professor
