= Jack Lees (footballer) =

English footballer (1892–1983)

Personal information
- Full name: John William Lees
- Date of birth: 26 July 1892
- Place of birth: Northwich, England
- Date of death: 1983 (aged 90–91)
- Position: Full-back

Senior career*
Years	Team	Apps	(Gls)
1919	Northwich Victoria		
1919–1921	Preston North End	31	(0)
1922–1930	Halifax Town	248	(1)
Total		279	(1)
- * Club domestic league appearances and goals

John William Lees (26 July 1892 – 1983) was an English footballer who played in the Football League for Halifax Town and Preston North End.
