= Charles Lee (activist) =

Taiwanese-American environmental justice activist

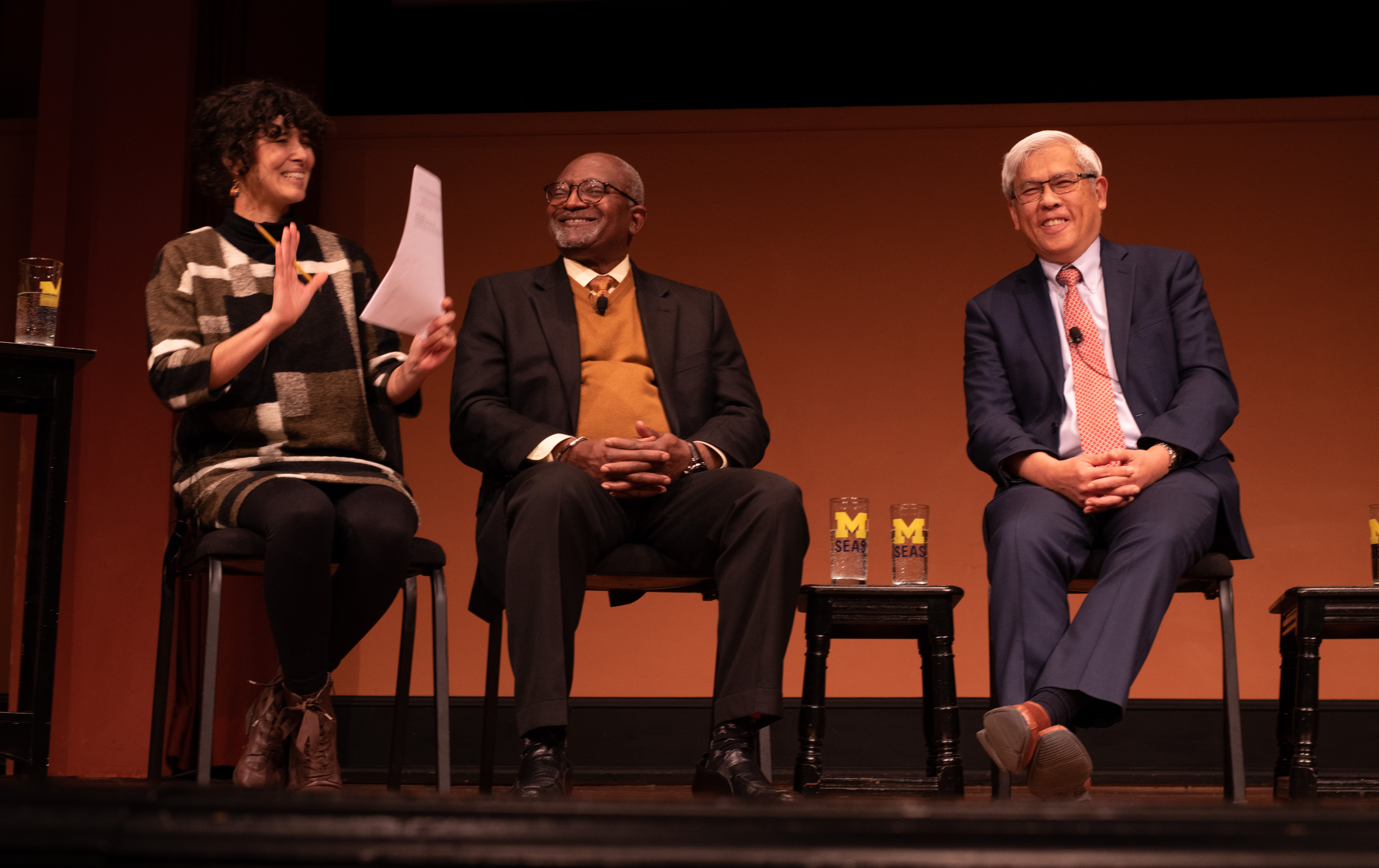
Charles Lee (pictured right) speaks at the Michigan Environmental Justice Summit

Charles Lee is a Taiwanese-American environmental justice activist and the former Senior Policy Advisor in the Office of Environmental Justice at the Environmental Protection Agency. Previously, he served as the director of the Office of Environmental Justice, and before that, he was the director of the Environmental Justice Program at the United Church of Christ for 15 years. He is best known for his work Toxic Wastes and Race in the United States, research that fundamentally shaped the environmental justice movement in the United States.

== Career ==
During the 1970s, Lee was a shop steward with 1199, the National Healthcare Workers' Union.

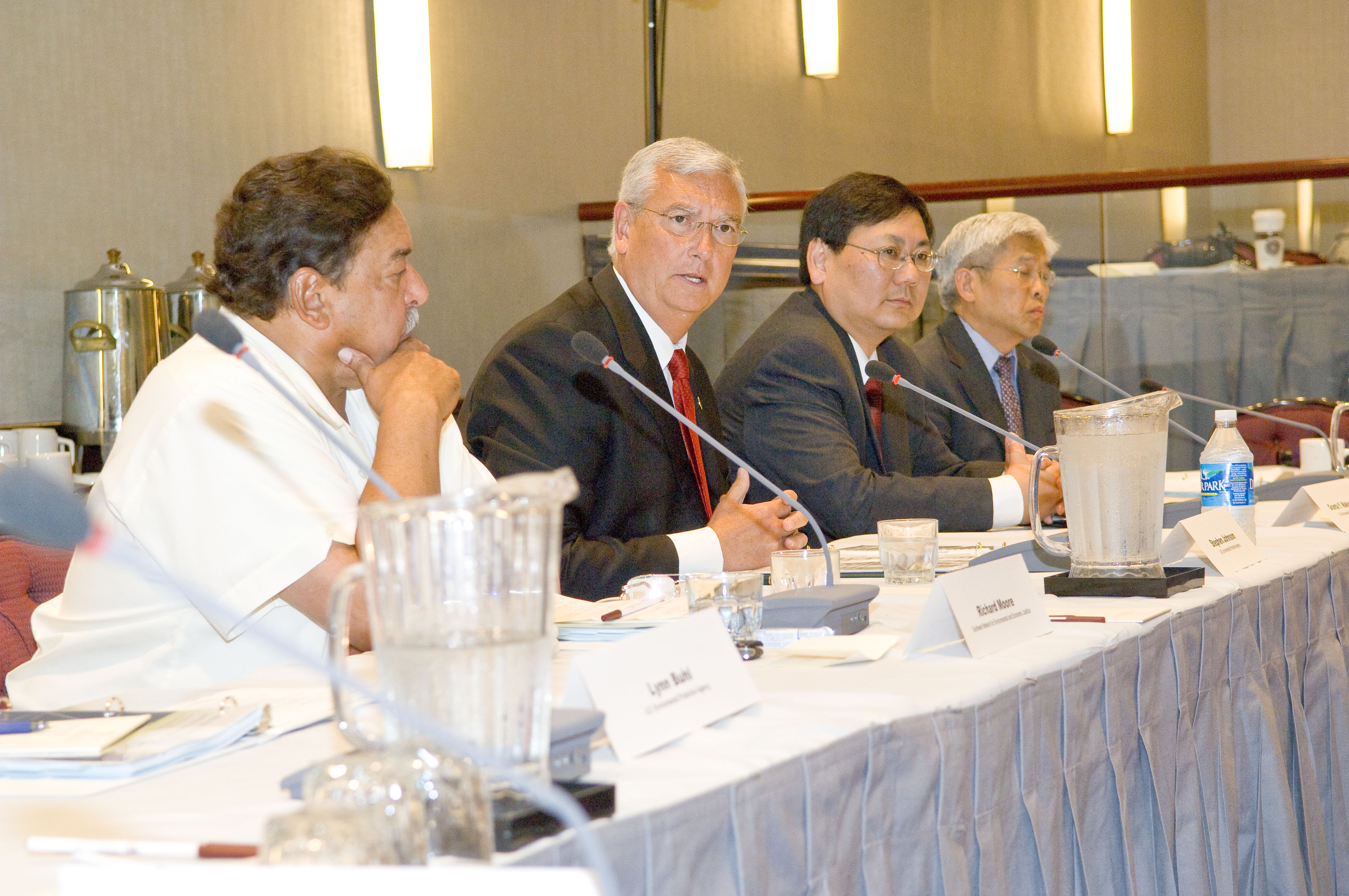
Lee (pictured far right) serves on the National Environmental Justice Advisory Council

In 1982, while he was working for the New Jersey Committee on Occupational Safety and Health, Lee travelled to Warren County, North Carolina to learn more about the county's recent plans to develop a polychlorinated biphenyl (PCB) landfill. Over 500 activists arranged a sit-in to attempt to stop construction of the landfill and the dumping of thousands of tons of contaminated soil into this predominantly Black county. Though they were unsuccessful in their efforts, their mobilization called attention to the term environmental justice nationally. In his travels to North Carolina, Lee met the leaders of the United Church of Christ's Commission for Racial Justice, who were part of the protestors of the development of the landfill. This would soon lead Lee to get job as the director of the Environmental Justice Program within the United Church of Christ, where he worked for 15 years.

Lee initially became involved with the EPA as the chair of the National Environmental Justice Advisory Council's Waste and Facility Siting Subcommittee while he was working in the United Church of Christ. He eventually got a full time job within the EPA as the Associate Director of Policy and the Interagency Liaison for the Office of Environmental Justice in 1999. After eight years in that position, in 2007, he was appointed to Senior Policy Advisor within the Office of Environmental Justice. In his role at the EPA, he served to incorporate the ideal of environmental justice into national rule-making by fostering collaboration across sectors and backgrounds. In March 2025, Lee retired from the EPA.

== Legacy ==
In 1987, the United Church of Christ released a report entitled Toxic Wastes and Race in the United States, of which Lee was the principal author. The report has been described as "groundbreaking" and as "the first report to use rigorous analysis and methods to show how pollution and environmental hazards were disproportionately affecting minority and low-income communities." It had a much more rapid impact than Lee had anticipated: within six years, all of its recommendations had been implemented.

In October 1991, within his role with the United Church of Christ, Lee organized the first ever National People of Color Environmental Leadership Summit, which brought together over 1,100 delegates in Washington, D.C. At the first summit, delegates worked together to create the 17 Principles of Environmental Justice and the Principles of Working Together, documents that were foundational to ideals of the environmental justice movement nationwide. This annual summit continues to this day.

In 2017, Lee was honored by the House of Representatives in South Carolina and invited to give the keynote address at the University of South Carolina School of Public Health and Department of Environmental Health Services Seminar.

== Research contributions ==
- Toxic Wastes and Race in the United States, United Church of Christ, 1987
- "Environmental justice: building a unified vision of health and the environment", National Library of Health and Medicine, 2002
- "Confronting Disproportionate Impacts and Systemic Racism in Environmental Policy", Environmental Law Institute, 2021
- "Another Game Changer in the Making? Lessons from States Advancing Environmental Justice through Mapping and Cumulative Impact Strategies", Environmental Law Institute, 2021
