= John Lees (walker) =

English sports journalist and long-distance walker (born 1945)

John Lees, born in Hove, Sussex, England in 1945, is a retired sports journalist who holds the record for completing the fastest coast-to-coast walk across the United States.

Despite having asthma, he walked the length of Britain from Land's End at the southwestern tip of England to John o' Groats at the northeastern tip of Scotland in 1971. His walk covered 981 miles in 26½ days.

The following year, when he completed his record-breaking 2,801 mile trans-America walk, he completed between 50 and 60 miles per day, averaging 55 miles daily, overall, at average speeds ranging between 4 and 5 mph. Starting at Los Angeles City Hall on 11 April 1972, he walked for 53 days, 12 hours and 15 minutes to New York City Hall, finishing on 3 June 1972.

Lees became the sports reporter and cricket commentator for various BBC radio stations in the south east of England, including BBC Sussex, BBC Surrey and BBC Southern Counties Radio, where he was often referred to as "the gentleman of sport". He retired from BBC radio in September 2017.

He returned to New York City Hall to mark the 30th anniversary of his endurance walk. The visit was covered by BBC Southern Counties Radio.

Lees is a keen birdwatcher.
