= William Oldham =

William Oldham may refer to:

- William Oldham (rugby union), English international rugby union player
- William Kavanaugh Oldham (1865–1938), acting Democratic governor of the U.S. state of Arkansas, 1913
- William Fitzjames Oldham (1854–1937), Indian-born British-American bishop and missionary
- William Simpson Oldham, Sr. (1813–1868), politician in the Confederate States of America during the American Civil War
- William Oldham (Patriot) (1753–1791), American Revolutionary War soldier and namesake of Oldham County, Kentucky
- Will Oldham (born 1970), American singer, songwriter, and actor
