= Charles Que Fong Lee =

(1913–1996) Chinese-Australian diplomat

Charles Que Fong Lee also known as Charlie Yee (5 May 1913 - 17 November 1996) was a Chinese-Australian diplomat who was born in the Northern Territory of Australia. He served as a diplomat around the world throughout his career including in the Australia legation to China during World War II.

As a Chinese-Australian, he experienced significant racism throughout his career despite his personal belief that the White Australia policy was 'a misnomer'.

== Early life ==
Lee was born in Pine Creek as the child of Youin Gon and Mow Tam (Margaret) Lee, both of whom had migrated there from China. Lee attended his early years of school in Darwin where he excelled and, in 1927, was offered a North Australia Scholarship to attend school in Queensland and have his expenses covered while doing so; this is something his family would not have been able to afford alone.

With this support he was able to attend The Southport School and, afterwards, the University of Queensland where he undertook a Bachelor of Arts. Along with his studies, Lee excelled in sports and was involved in both athletics, primarily as a sprinter, and played rugby for the university team and for state.

== Diplomatic career ==
After completing his degree Lee took a role as a clerk for the Department of Trade and Customs in Canberra in 1936. This appointment was reported nationally as it was considered notable as he was a 'full-blooded' Australian born Chinese man.

In 1937, Lee was transferred to Sydney where, in addition to his work in the public service, he focused on learning languages. At this time Lee already spoke Cantonese and he started studying Japanese part-time at the University of Sydney and, alter, was also able to learn Mandarin.

In 1941, Lee transferred to the Department of External Affairs where he was the third secretary, also called the 'Oriental secretary' within the first Australia legation to China where he worked under Frederic Eggleston. Due to World War II to legation was based in Chongqing where he formed relationships with much of the inner circles of the Kuomintang and the Chinese Communist Party; Lee also travelled to Nanking (Nanjing) and Canton (Guangzhou). Lee also befriended many other diplomats, intelligence agents and journalists from around the world who were living there and this made many of his Australian colleagues uncomfortable.

One of the men Lee worked with said of him:

He was a puzzle to many; here was a man in China who was clearly Chinese but who represented Australia. His friendships ramified through many circles and layers. News of political events often reached Canberra before it was known in Nanking any great distance from its origin.

— William Stenhouse Hamilton, Notes from old Nanking 1947-1949: the great transition (2004)

Lee returned to Canberra in 1950 and took a number of overseas roles in various diplomatic roles including in Singapore (1953), Jakarta (1954-1956), Manila (1960), Wellington (1958-1960), Rio de Janeiro (1965-1969) and finally Madrid (1971-1973). He retired as a diplomat in 1973, after finishing his appointment in Madrid, however, did offer advice to the Whitlam government regarding establishing better diplomatic relationships with China in his retirement.

== Personal life ==
In 1958, Lee married Nany Chow, who he had met in China in the 1940s, in Washington, D.C.

He died on 17 November 1966.

== Papers ==
Lee's papers, as well as a collection of biographical cuttings about him, are available at the National Library of Australia.
