= Charles Lees =

Charles Lees may refer to:

- Charles Cameron Lees (colonial administrator) (1837–1898), British military officer and colonial administrator
- Charles Lees (painter) (1800–1880), Scottish portrait painter
- Charles Herbert Lees (1864–1952), British physicist
- Charles Lees of the Lees baronets
- Charlie Lees (1887–1976), rugby league player

== See also ==
- Charles Lee (disambiguation)
