= Richard Oldham =

Richard Oldham may refer to:

- Richard Oldham (bishop) (died 1485/86), bishop of Sodor and Man
- Richard Oldham (priest) (1814–1889), Scottish Episcopalian priest
- Richard Dixon Oldham (1858–1936), British geologist
