= Scott Oldham =

American journalist

Scott Oldham (born 1969) was vice president of editorial for Edmunds Inc.'s Edmunds.com, where he was responsible for the quality and direction of content published. He started with Edmunds.com in December 2004 as senior editor with the company's now-defunct enthusiast site, Inside Line, and left the company in October 2016. Oldham was invited to be on the North American Car and Truck of Year Jury. The jury consists of 50 of the top journalists from a variety of automotive media outlets in the United States and Canada.

He earned his BA in journalism from Glassboro State College, now known as Rowan University. Previously, he worked at Sport Compact Car, European Car, Super Chevy Popular Mechanics and has also been published in Car and Driver and the Los Angeles Times.

Scott was also known to be a stockholder in a hair gel company due to his love affair with drop-top automobiles. During a driving session on PCH near Redondo Beach, Oldham was pulled over for speeding; he told the police officer he was trying to keep the car out of 1st gear.

Oldham was on the board of the Los Angeles-based Motor Press Guild, and has been the president of that association.

== Family ==
His father is Joe Oldham, who was Popular Mechanics' longtime editor.
