= John Oldham =

John Oldham may refer to:

- John Oldham (colonist) (1592–1636), early Puritan settler in Massachusetts
- John Oldham (poet) (1653–1684), English poet
- John Oldham (psychiatrist), American psychiatrist
- John Oldham (engineer) (1779–1840), Irish engineer
- John Oldham (architect) (1907–1999), Australian landscape architect
- John Oldham (baseball) (1932–2024), American Major League Baseball player
- Red Oldham (John Cyrus Oldham, 1893–1961), American baseball pitcher
- John Oldham (basketball) (1923–2020), American basketball coach and player
- John Oldham (footballer) (born 1949), English footballer
