= Charles James Lea =

English painter

Charles James Lea (1828 or 1829 – 1884) was an English interior artist. He described himself as an ecclesiastical decorator, completing many works mostly in his native Leicestershire before moving to work from Manchester from 1872. Perhaps his most famous work is the botanical paintings for the Ceilings of the Natural History Museum, London.

Lea was born in 1828 or 1829. His father was probably Benjamin Lea, who worked as painter, paper-hanger and gilder from premises in Lutterworth in Leicestershire. By 1853 Charles Lea had his own similar but separate business in Lutterworth. He married Eliza, and they had at least four children, including Richard Henry Lea who later co-founded the Lea-Francis bicycle (and later car and motorcycle) manufacturing company.

Charles Lea became an accomplished church decorator, exhibiting works at the meetings of the Architectural Society of the Archdeaconry of Northampton. He won the £2 second prize at a competition held by the Ecclesiological Society at the South Kensington Museum in 1861: the entries were exhibited at the 1862 International Exhibition in London. His prize-winning design may have been part of his decorative scheme for the church of St Alban, Rochdale; the church was demolished in the 1970s.

Lea decorated many church interiors in the 1860s, mostly in Leicestershire, but much of his work has been destroyed or overpainted, including a large version of the Ten Commandments painted on the chancel arch at St Dionysius' Church, Market Harborough. The stencilled flowers and foliage on the nave ceiling at All Saints, Husbands Bosworth, painted in 1867, is a good surviving example of his decorative work; the church is now a Grade II* listed building.

Lea was associated with George Gilbert Scott from c.1858, after Lea painted the ceiling of the reconstructed chancel at All Saints, Theddingworth (now Grade I listed), adding IHC monographs in rectangular panels with foliage and flowers according to designs by George Frederick Bodley.

Lea moved to Manchester in 1872, where he formed a partnership with William Best, trading as Best & Lea. They did work at Eaton Hall, Cheshire for the Duke of Westminster, and decorated the original council chamber (now a conference room) and reception rooms at Manchester Town Hall, the refreshment room at Rochdale Town Hall, and the gallery at Derby Museum and Library. Perhaps his most famous work is the botanical paintings for the Ceilings of the Natural History Museum, London, executed in response to botanical illustrations provided by the architect Alfred Waterhouse and completed by 1881.

He died at Matlock Bridge, Derbyshire, in 1884.

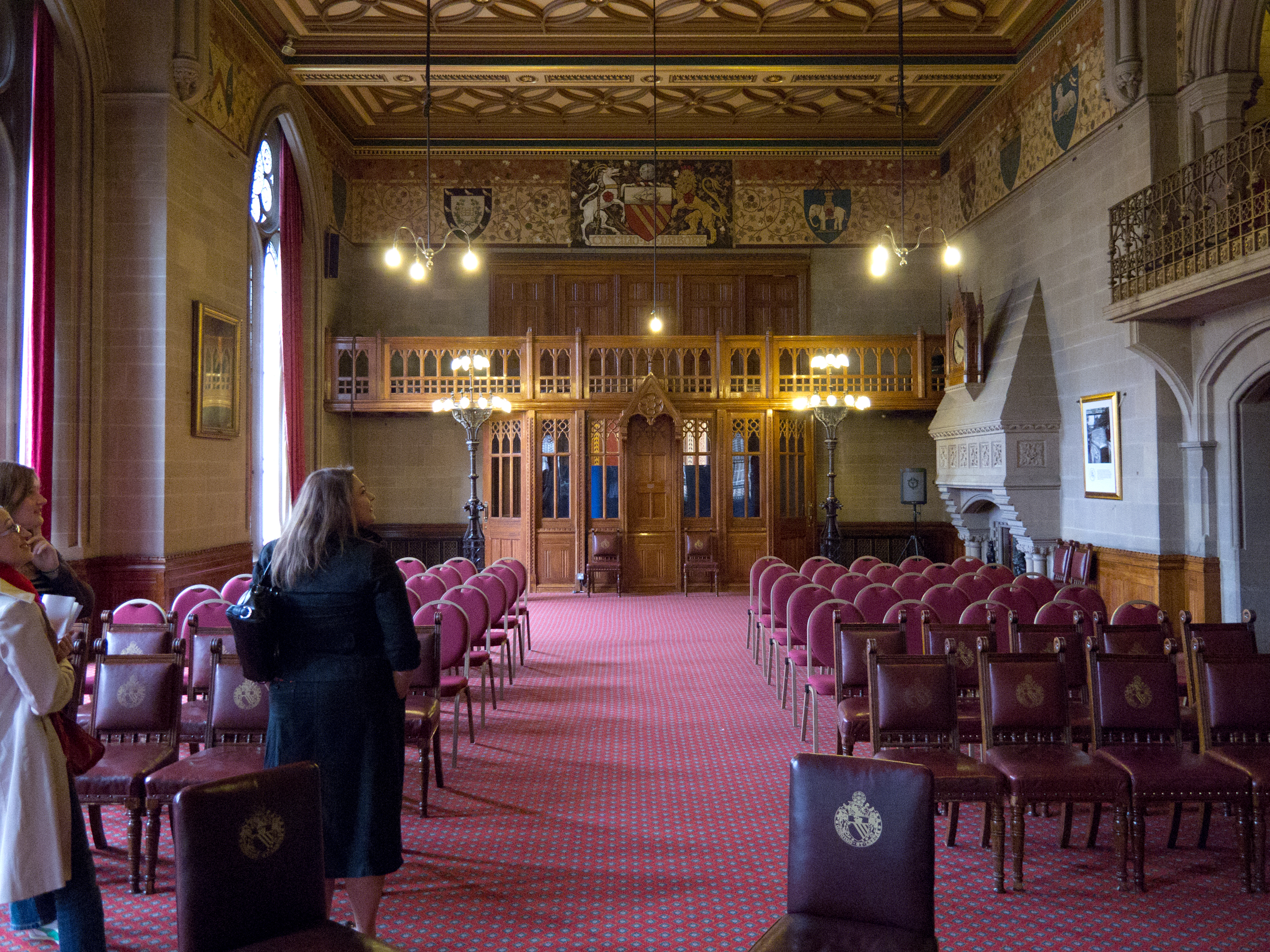
The old council chamber, Manchester Town Hall

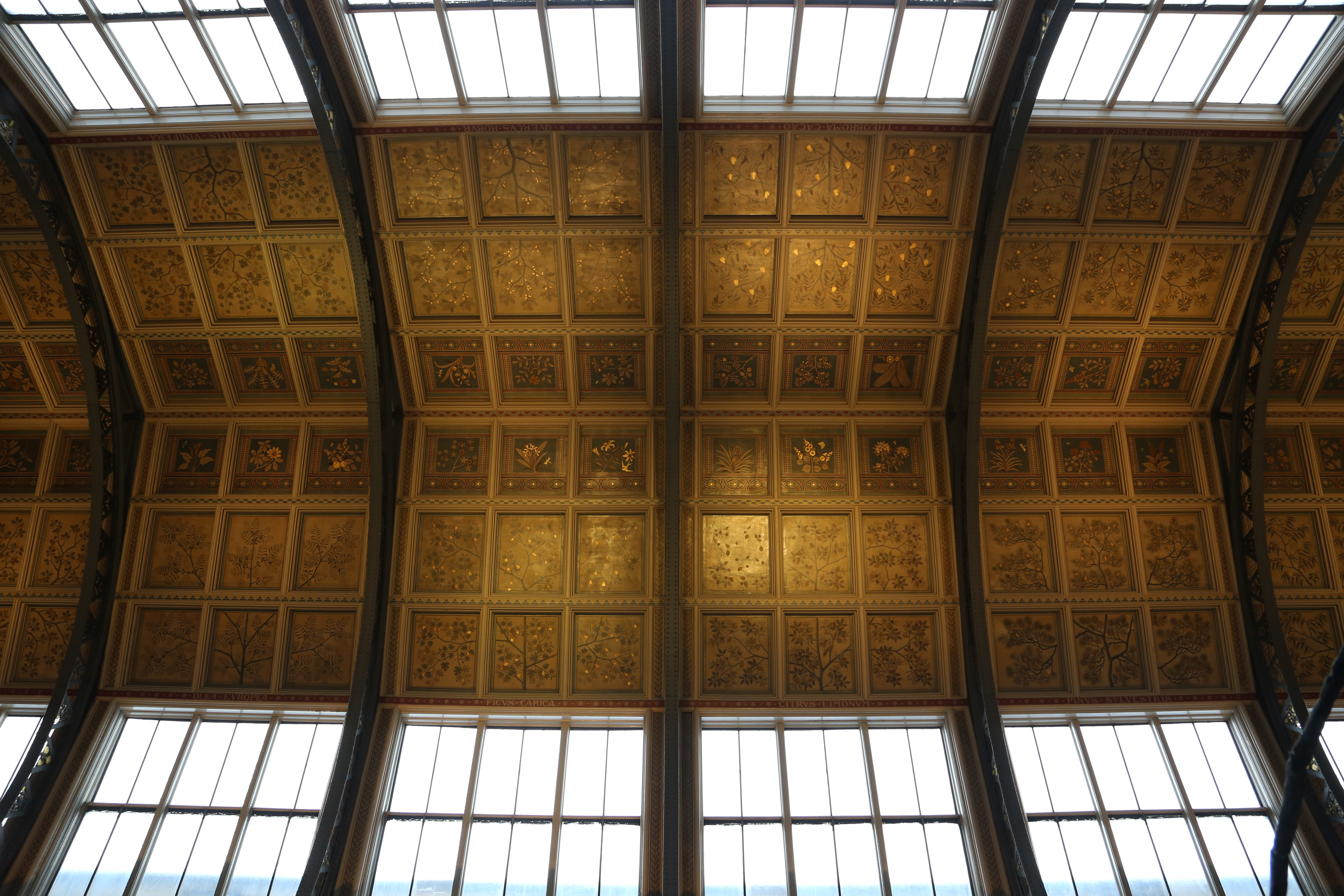
Natural History Museum, London
