= Robert Lees (disambiguation) =

Robert Lees (1912–2004) was an American screenwriter.

Robert Lees may also refer to:

- Robert Lees (linguist) (1922–1996), American linguist
- Robert James Lees (1849–1931), British spiritualist
- Robert Lees (politician) (1842–1908), Wisconsin politician

== See also ==
- Robert Lee (disambiguation)
