= Marjory Lees =

British suffragist and local politician

- Born: 13 August 1878; Oldham, Greater Manchester, England
- Died: 11 May 1970 (aged 91); Oldham, Greater Manchester, England
- Occupations: Suffragist, local politician
- Family: Sarah Lees (mother)

Marjory Lees (9 September 1878 – 11 May 1970) was a British suffragist and local politician. Lees was active in the local women's movement in Oldham, Greater Manchester where she became the honorary secretary of the local branch of the National Union of Women Workers.

== Life ==
Marjory Lees was born in Oldham, Greater Manchester in 1878, her mother was politician and activist Dame Sarah Lees.

Marjory, like her mother, became active in local politics and the wider women's suffrage movement. She made charitable to donations to the local community, began a career as a poor law guardian and became president of the Oldham Women's Suffrage Society. Lees also took part in the Suffrage Pilgrimage in 1913.

In 1919, she was elected to Oldham council following her mother's resignation from the same seat, serving on the council until she stepped down in 1934.

Lees donated Werneth Park, her family home, to the people of Oldham in 1936 after the death of her mother.
