= The Southport School =

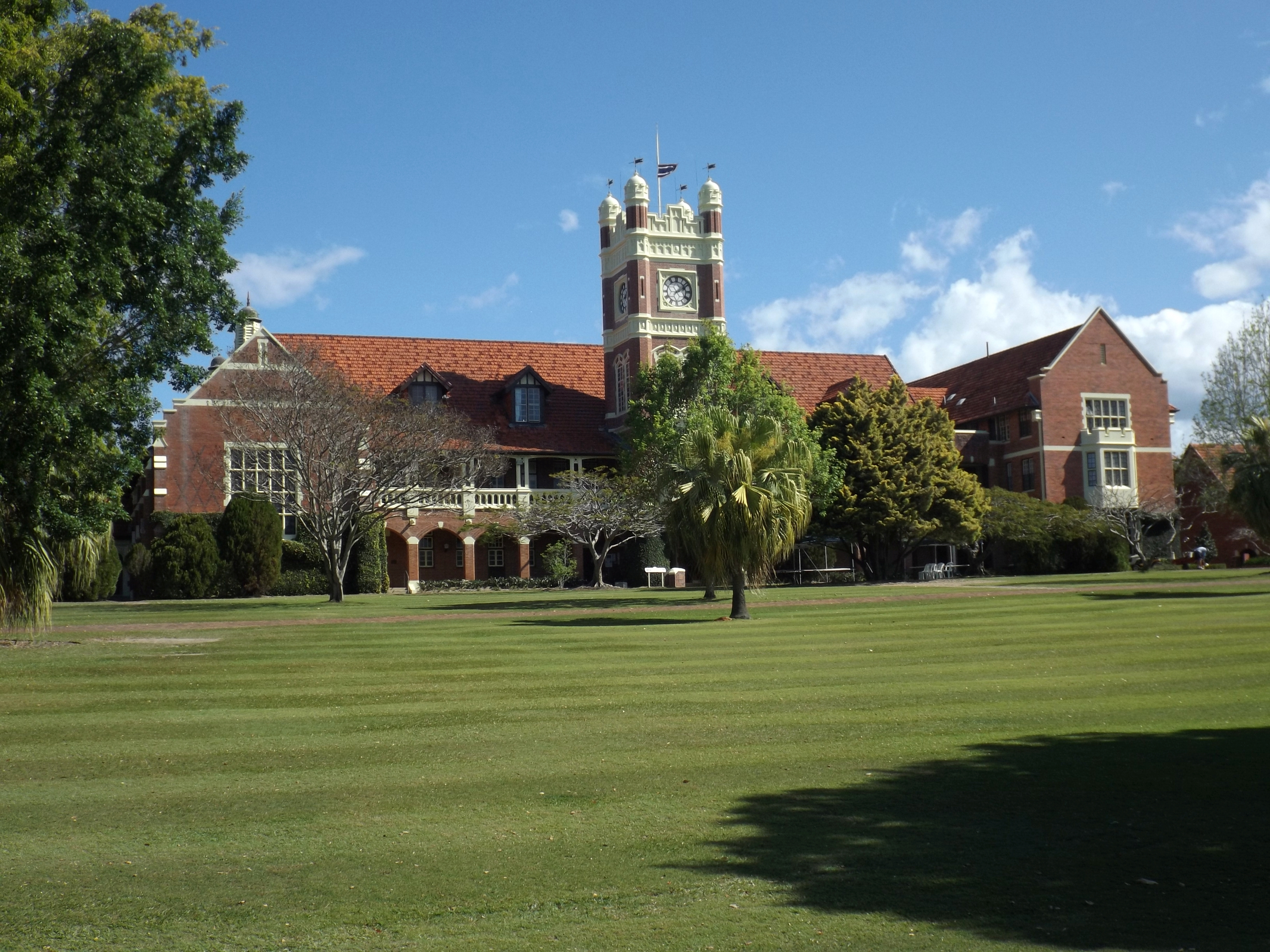

Location
- 2 Winchester Street, Southport, Queensland; Australia; 27°59′8″S 153°24′52″E

Information
- Type: Independent early learning, primary and secondary day and boarding school
- Motto: Latin: Palmam Qui Meruit Ferat (Let him who deserves the palm of victory bear it.)
- Denomination: Anglican
- Established: 1901; 125 years ago
- Founder: Horace Henry Dixon
- Chairman: Adam Twemlow
- Headmaster: Andrew Hawkins
- Years: Early learning to Year 12
- Gender: Boys only
- Enrolment: c. 1,551
- Colours: Navy, white & maroon
- Tuition: Varies by grade
- Affiliation: Australian Boarding Schools Association; Association of Heads of Independent Schools of Australia; Independent Primary School Heads of Australia; Independent Schools Queensland; Great Public Schools Association of Queensland; Round Square schools
- Alumni: Old Southportonians
- Website: www.tss.qld.edu.au

The Southport School (TSS) is an independent Anglican early learning, primary and secondary day and boarding school for boys, located in Southport, a suburb on the Gold Coast of Queensland, Australia.

Established in 1901 by the Revd Horace Henry Dixon, TSS is the oldest Anglican boys' boarding school in Queensland and the only all-boys boarding school on the Gold Coast. The school has a non-selective enrolment policy and currently caters for approximately 1305 students from early learning to Year 12, including 276 boarders from Years 7 to 12.

The school is affiliated with the Australian Boarding Schools Association (ABSA), the Association of Heads of Independent Schools of Australia (AHISA), the Independent Primary School Heads of Australia (IPSHA), Independent Schools Queensland (ISQ), and has been a member of the Great Public Schools Association of Queensland (GPS) since 1920.

== History ==
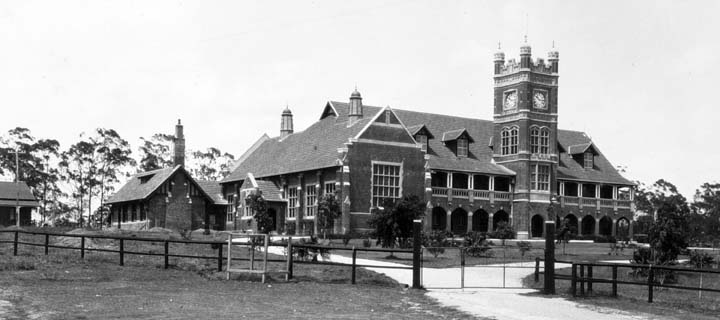
The Southport School 1934

The Southport School was established in 1901 by the Revd (later Rt Revd) Horace Dixon. The land was originally owned by Benjamin and Ann Spendelove.

The first boarding houses (Delpratt, McKinley and Thorold) were established in 1908.

The Southport School has the third oldest school boat club in Queensland, having first started rowing in 1905. This followed Brisbane Grammar School and Ipswich Grammar School first having a rowing contest in 1890.

== Headmasters ==
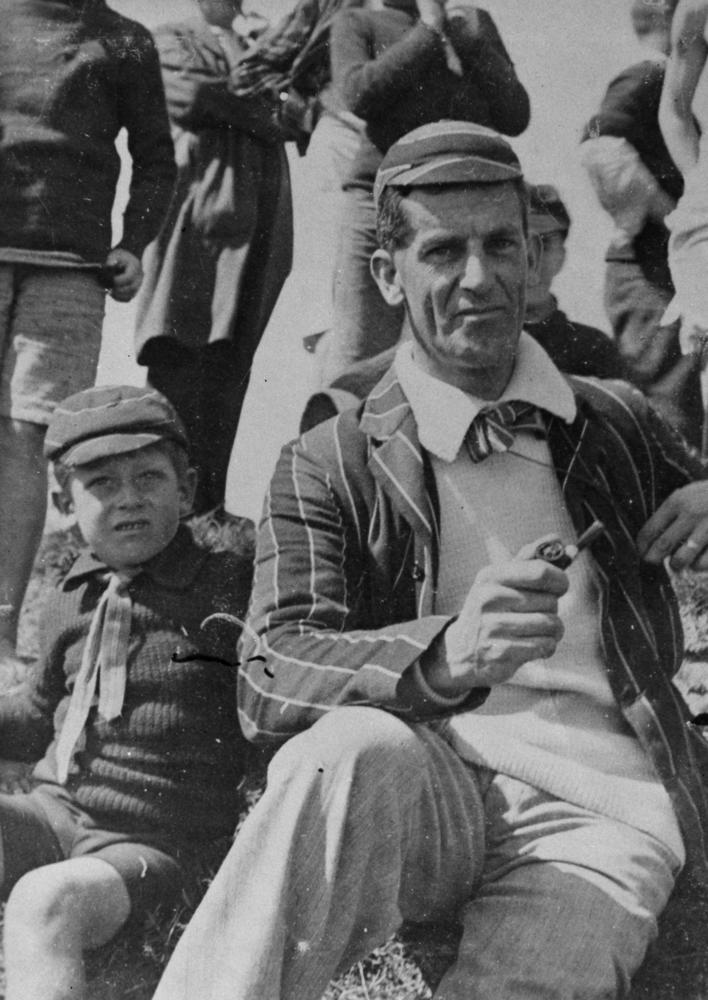
Horace H. Dixon and son

The following is a list of the headmasters of the school.

Period	Details	Notes
1901–1929	The Revd (later Rt Revd) Horace Henry Dixon CBE	
1930–1935	Bertram George Lawrance	
1936–1940	Verney Lovett Johnstone	
1941–1950	John Norman Radcliffe	
1950–1971	Cecil Garton Pearce OBE	
1972–1987	John Henry Day AM	
1988–2003	Bruce Alexander Cook OAM	
2004–2020	Greg Wain	
2021–	Andrew Hawkins	

== House system ==
The Southport School utilises a house system. The Senior School is divided vertically into the twelve houses: eight day boy houses and four boarding houses. The Preparatory School is divided into four houses. The Senior Houses are:

Name	Day/boarding	Colours
Atkinson	Day	
Biddle	Boarding	
Delpratt	Boarding	
Kaiser	Day	
Maughan	Day	
McKinley	Boarding	
Melbourne	Day	
Radcliffe	Day	
Surman	Day	
Thorold	Boarding	
Turnock	Day	
Walker	Day	
Rogers	Boarding year 7 only	
Musgrave	Prep-day	
Shepherd	Prep-day	
Dixon	Prep-day	
Mitre	Prep-day	

The three original houses – Delpratt, McKinley and Thorold – were founded in 1909, 1909 and 1908, respectively.

== Sport ==
School cricket team ca. 1912

TSS has a strong sporting tradition and over the years has produced many Australian and international athletes of note. The school currently offers the following activities to its students: basketball, chess, cricket, cross country, debating, soccer, gymnastics, rowing, rugby, swimming, sailing, tennis, and track and field. TSS has been a member of the Great Public Schools' Association Inc (GPS) since 1920. TSS fields soccer teams within the development divisions of Football Queensland South Coast. The school has achieved many sporting premierships during its membership.

GPS Premierships (official GPS records):

- Rowing (22) 1918, 1920, 1921, 1923, 1930, 1931, 1933, 1953, 1954, 1958, 1959, 1970, 1978, 1985, 1986, 1987, 1989, 1991, 2000, 2006, 2018, 2024, 2025, 2026
- Cricket (24) 1920, 1923, 1926, 1927, 1928, 1929, 1970, 1971, 1972, 1973, 1974, 1980, 1981, 1982, 2010, 2011, 2014, 2015, 2017, 2018, 2019, 2021, 2023, 2024, 2025, 2026
- Rugby (12) 1922, 1926, 1933, 1938, 2001, 2003, 2006, 2007, 2010, 2017, 2019, 2022
- Tennis (9) 1921, 1924, 1926, 1930, 1934, 1956, 2000, 2001, 2018
- Swimming (8) 1922, 2004, 2005, 2007, 2008, 2013, 2015, 2016
- Gymnastics (7) 1935, 1936, 1962, 1963, 2008, 2009, 2010
- Sailing (7) 2002, 2003, 2014, 2015, 2016, 2017, 2018, 2019, 2022
- Athletics (5) 1918, 1919, 1922, 1929, 1933
- Football (4) 2012, 2013, 2014, 2020
- Basketball (4) 2009, 2012, 2021, 2023
- Cross Country (1) 1990
- Shooting (4) 1956, 1963, 1967, 1971 (suspended 1974)

Associated Schools Championships:

- Basketball 1980–81 (1979–1986)
- Soccer 1978, 1980, 1981, 1984, 1987, 1988, 1990 (1978–1991)

State Championships

- Basketball (3) 2012, 2021, 2023

=== Basketball Team Achievements ===
==== Championship Men (Open) ====
- Australian Schools Championships

(gold) Champions: 2023

== Academics ==
The Southport School employs a team of gifted and talented staff, constituting the school's 'Academic Talent Development' (ATD) program. The program is composed of enrolled students who have displayed exceptional results in their respective ACER tests, and encourages them to pursue their academic prowess by championing initiatives and competition such as Future Problem Solving (FPS), Tournament of the Minds (TOMs), DaVinci Decathlon, F1 in schools, Maths Olympiads, and various model united nations conferences, including a TSS-run competition including other schools from around South-East Queensland known as TSSMUN, and Bond University's High School Model United Nations competition, BUHMUN.

== Notable alumni ==
The Old Southportonians Association (OSA) is the alumni organisation for Old Boys of the school. All Old Boys of the school become a member of the OSA, which boasts a proud list of members such as Nathan Sharpe, Michael Neser, and more. The OSA is run by Old Boys and other volunteers The OSA celebrated its 100 years as a recognised body in 2007.

Historic figures also include past choirmaster Henry John King.

== Student exchange program ==
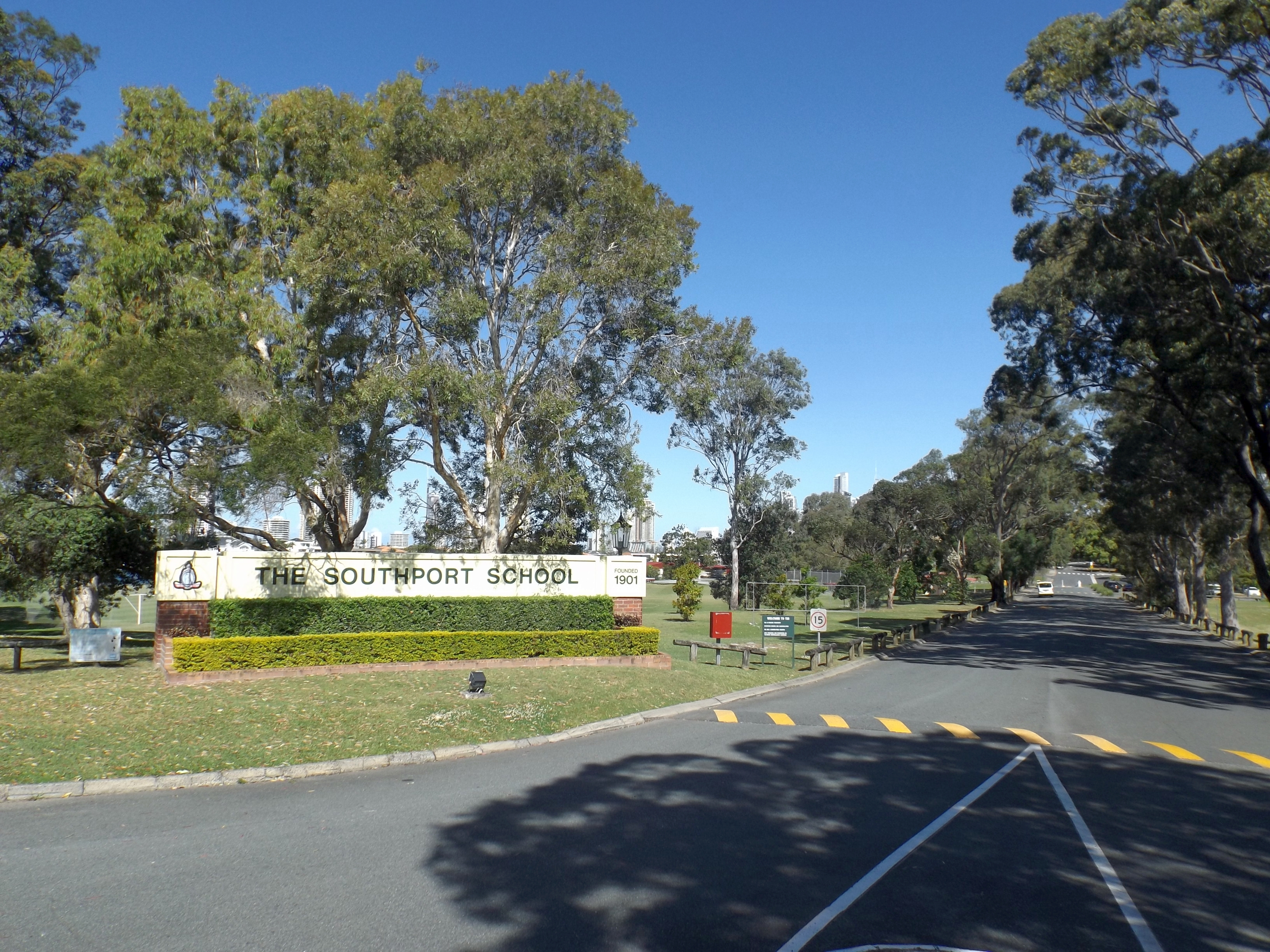
Main entrance, 2015

The Southport School is a member of Round Square and as such has an extensive network of partner schools with which it performs many student exchanges. TSS is involved in a student exchange program with the Baylor School in Chattanooga, Tennessee, United States; and with Collingwood School in West Vancouver, British Columbia, Canada.

== Pacific Cable Station ==
The two surviving buildings of the Pacific Cable Station were relocated to the school in the year of 1982 for use as the school's music department. Largely untouched from their original form, they are listed on the Gold Coast Local Heritage Register.

== See also ==
- List of boarding schools in Australia
- List of schools in Queensland
- List of Anglican schools in Australia
