= Wroth =

Wroth is a surname. Notable people with the surname include:

- Henry Wroth, English royalist soldier
- John Wroth (disambiguation), several people
- Lady Mary Wroth (1587–1651/3), English poet
- Lawrence C. Wroth (1884–1970), American historian
- Robert Wroth (Middlesex MP) (1540?–1606), English politician
- Robert Wroth (died 1614), English politician
- Robert Wroth (Guildford MP) (1660–1720), English politician
- Thomas Wroth (politician, 16th century) (c.1518–1573), English courtier and politician
- Thomas Wroth (politician, 17th century) (1584–1672), English politician
- Warwick William Wroth (1858–1911), antiquarian
- William Wroth (1576–1642), minister of the Church of England

== Fictional ==
- Krysty Wroth a fictional character

== Other ==
- Wroth baronets, created in 1660 for John Wroth
- Wroth H. Manlove (died 1985), American politician and judge
