= Thomas Wroth =

Thomas Wroth may refer to:

- Thomas Wroth (died 1573) (1516–1573), English courtier and politician
- Thomas Wroth (died 1672) (1584–1672), English parliamentarian and author
- Sir Thomas Wroth, 3rd Baronet (1674–1721), English High Sheriff and Member of Parliament

== See also ==
- Wroth (surname)
