= Thomas Wroth (died 1573) =

English courtier, landowner and politician

Sir Thomas Wroth (c. 1518 – 9 October 1573) was an English courtier, landowner and politician, a supporter of the Protestant Reformation and a prominent figure among the Marian exiles.

== Family origins ==
The Tudor-age family of Wroth of Enfield derived from the marriage of John Wroth and Maud Durrant. Both were descendants of Hugh du Plessis (nephew of John du Plessis, 7th Earl of Warwick) and Muriel de Wrotham, an heiress of the family of William de Wrotham, who had been Constable of Dover Castle in the time of King John. Maud's father Thomas Durrant the younger, son of Hugh's granddaughter (by his eldest son) Avelina, built the residence of Durrants at Enfield and held estates at Edmonton. John Wroth was a great-grandson of Hugh's youngest son Richard (died c. 1292), who became established at Enfield under the name of de Wrotham. The lines and estates of John and Maud were united in their son William.

John Wroth, great-grandson of John and Maud, married Elizabeth, daughter of Sir Roger Lewknor of Broadhurst (Horsted Keynes, Sussex), and the heiress Eleanor Camoys (great-parents of Jane Lewknor, Sir Richard Lewknor and Thomas Lewknor), in c. 1456. Their grandson Robert Wroth (of Durrants at Enfield, and of North Newton in North Petherton, Somerset), of Gray's Inn, married Jane, daughter of Sir Thomas Hawte (died 1505, son of Sir William Hawte) and his wife Isabel Frowyk, sister of Sir Thomas Frowyk. (Jane was the widow of Thomas Goodere of Monken Hadley, Middlesex, by whom she had children including Francis, politician, and Anne, wife of Sir George Penruddock of Ivychurch, Wiltshire.) Robert Wroth was one of the commissioners appointed to inquire into Thomas Wolsey's possessions in 1529, and from 1531 Attorney of the Duchy of Lancaster. He sat for Middlesex in the Reformation parliament (1529–1535). He and Jane had four sons, Thomas, Oliver, John and William, and two daughters, Dorothy and Susan. By his will of 1536 Wroth indicated his expectation that his daughter Dorothy should marry his ward Edward Lewknor.

== Youth and marriage ==
Robert Wroth became a friend of Thomas Cromwell's, and for two years before his death in 1536 shared with him the stewardship of Westminster Abbey. Thomas Wroth, the eldest son, entered St. John's College, Cambridge, but seems to have taken no degree. In 1536, becoming a ward of the king, he was admitted student of Gray's Inn, and on 4 October his wardship and marriage were granted to Cromwell. Cromwell sold the marriage in 1539 to Sir Richard Rich for three hundred marks, who provided for his third daughter, Mary, by arranging her betrothal to Thomas. Wroth was granted livery of his lands on 24 April 1540, and in that and the following year Rich secured for his daughter's husband the manors of Highbury (forfeited by Cromwell) and Enfield, and of Beymondhall (i.e. Beaumond Hall) at Cheshunt, with its manorial appurtenances in Wormley in Hertfordshire, belonging to various dissolved monasteries.

== Favour ==
On 18 December 1544 Wroth was returned to parliament as one of the knights of the shire for Middlesex, and in the following year, reputedly through Thomas Cranmer's influence, was appointed Gentleman-Usher of the Privy Chamber to Prince Edward. He served in that office during Edward VI's reign, being dubbed a Knight of the Carpet at the King's coronation on 22 February 1546/7, and was one of the young king's principal favourites. In September 1547 he was sent to the Protector Edward Seymour, 1st Duke of Somerset in Scotland with Edward's letters congratulating him on his victory at the Battle of Pinkie, and in July 1548 was one of the witnesses against Bishop Stephen Gardiner for his sermon in St. Paul's Cathedral. He probably represented Middlesex in the parliament that sat from 1547 to 1552, but the returns are wanting. After Somerset's fall Wroth was on 15 October 1549 appointed one of the four principal gentlemen of the privy chamber, his fidelity to the Earl of Warwick's interests being secured by doubling the ordinary salary of £50. With Lord Rich he was jointly lieutenant of Waltham Forest from 1549. He held the office of King's standard-bearer during the minority of Sir Anthony Browne the younger.

Wroth received 'an astonishing prodigality of grants of land, lordships, reversions, hereditaments'. In December 1549, extended in July 1550, he was granted the Great and Little Parks of Great Bardfield, and the lordships and manors of Chigwell and West Hatch (Chigwell) in Essex. He was granted, but at once surrendered, the offices of keeper or steward of the manors of Elsing and Worcetors at Enfield, and of Edmonton, and Keeper and Master of the Hunt of the New Park at Enfield, in reversion. The manors of Northall and Downebarnes (Northolt, Middlesex) and Hampstead, and the advowson of Greenford (Middlesex) came to him by royal Letters Patent in April 1550. On 14 April 1551 he was made Lord Lieutenant of Middlesex jointly with William Paget. He received grants of Bishops Lydeard in Somerset, Theydon Bois, Berden Priory and elsewhere in 1551, and of Abingdon Abbey, Berkshire, in 1552. On 29 November 1551 he was present at the disputation on the Sacrament held in William Cecil's house.

In the time of King Henry VI William Wrothe had held the valuable office of Forester of Petherton Park at North Petherton in Somerset, in succession to the Chaucer family. In 1508 Robert Wroth, father of Sir Thomas, was granted the same title by Henry VII for a term of 30 years, although the same was granted by Henry VIII to William Courtenay in 1513. In 1550 Sir Thomas petitioned King Edward to be admitted forester in fee of the King's Forests of Exmoor, Neroche, Mendip and Selwood, in consideration of the fact that he was a descendant and representative of William de Wrotham (who had been lord of the manor of Newton-Forester (nearby) during the time of King Richard I), and that he (Thomas) was inheritor and possessor of the greater part of that manor (among several others now combined as Newton-Wrothe). In October 1551 he was granted licence for his servants to shoot at fowl, mammals, fishes or deer with crossbows or handguns, an especially reserved right. The Wroth lands at Petherton descended to Robert Wroth (1576–1614, grandson of Sir Thomas by his son Robert, and husband of Mary Sidney (Lady Wroth)), who dissipated them, and after his death were purchased by Sir Thomas Wroth (grandson of Sir Thomas by his son Thomas of Bexley), who re-established the Wroth fortunes at Petherton Park.

Somerset's second fall brought Wroth further grants; on 22 January 1552, the day of the Protector's execution, he was sent to Sion House to report on the number and ages of the duke's sons, daughters, and servants, and on 7 June following was given a twenty-one years' lease of Sion. This he is said to have surrendered on an assurance that Edward designed it for some public charity. He received the manor of Basettes Fee, and St Leonard's Forest and manor at Horsham, Sussex, from the attainder of the Duke of Norfolk. In 1552, and again in 1553, he was one of the commissioners for the lord-lieutenancy of Middlesex, and in February 1552/3 he was again knight of the shire for Middlesex in Edward's last parliament. He was not a member of the privy council, but was one of those whom Edward VI proposed in March 1551/2 to 'call into commission,’ his name appearing on the committees of the council which were to execute penal laws and proclamations and to examine into the state of all the courts, especially the new courts of augmentations, first-fruits and tenths, and wards. In December 1552 he was placed on a further commission for the recovery of debts owing to the king from his paymasters.

He was one of the adventurers (investors) in the 1552 Second voyage to Barbary (Morocco), led by Thomas Wyndham, which traded for three months at Santa Cruz de Tenerife. He was also among the investors in the first voyages of Sir Hugh Willoughby and Richard Chancellor in search of a north-east passage to Cathay: his name appears among the incorporated founders of the Company of Merchant Adventurers to New Lands listed in Mary's charter of February 1554/55, though already then living abroad in exile.

== Exile 1554–1558 ==
Wroth was until July 1553 in close attendance upon Edward VI, who is said to have died in his arms. He obtained from Edward (at a late stage) the right to devolve his manors and lands upon his wife and heirs in the making of his own will. He signed the king's letters patent limiting the crown to Lady Jane Grey, but apparently took no overt part in Northumberland's insurrection. He was sent to the Tower of London on 27 July, but was soon released. In January 1554, however, when Henry Grey, Duke of Suffolk was meditating his second rising, Lord John Grey had an interview with Wroth, and urged him to join. Suspicion inevitably fell upon Wroth, as cousin-german to Jane Haute, wife of Thomas Wyatt the Younger. Gardiner proposed his arrest on the 27th, but Wroth escaped to the Continent.

Wroth travelled with Sir John Cheke, who was carrying a royal licence, and they reached Padua in July 1554. Many English exiles were gathered there, among them Sir Henry Neville, Sir John Cutts, Henry Kingsmill and Henry Cornwallis, and they were joined in late August by Sir Thomas Hoby, and by Sir Anthony Cooke. In late October 1554 Wroth, Cheke and Cooke, with their companies, joined with the Hoby party on an excursion to Mantua and Ferrara, returning to Padua in late November. The following August, Hoby's company having proceeded to Caldero beside Verona, Wroth and Cheke joined them there from Padua, avoiding a fresh outbreak of the plague, and they travelled north together through Rovereto, Innsbruck and Munich to Augsburg, where they arrived on 28 August 1555. After this, the Hobys went on to Frankfurt, but Wroth and Cheke diverted to Strasbourg, and remained there. In May 1556 John Cheke and Sir Peter Carew were seized in Flanders on the orders of King Philip and despatched unceremoniously to the Tower of London.

In the Spring of 1556 Wroth's brother-in-law Edward Lewknor was drawn into the conspiracy of Henry Dudley and Henry Peckham against Mary. On 6 June Lewknor was arrested and committed to the Tower. The following day Mary issued orders to William Paget for the leading exiles (Sir Thomas Wroth heading the list of nine names) to be summoned immediately to England, "all excuses, delayes, lettes, hindrances and other occasions happening to you whatsoever utterly sett ap[ar]te", to appear before the King and Queen and privy council on the last day of October to answer such matters as may be objected against them, not failing upon their faith or allegiance. John Brett was despatched with this commission on 16 June. As Lewknor lay attainted and condemned in the Tower awaiting execution or pardon, Wroth in Strasbourg evaded the unwelcome missive and its unhappy bearer and instead obtained right of residence there. Lewknor died in the Tower in September 1556, as Cheke was writing his letter of submission to Queen Mary.

Wroth's brother Oliver had been in company in England with some of the conspirators, and at their arrest had fled to France, where he continued to have dealings with Henry Dudley and his friends. In Paris in November 1556 he gave information to Mary's ambassador at Poissy, Dr Nicholas Wotton, of French designs to exploit Dudley to subvert the allegiance of the English lieutenant at Hampnes near Calais. Oliver had favourable opportunities for marriage and employment in Paris, but wrote to Wotton seeking royal pardon and permission to return home. Wotton at once sent him to Sir William Petre in England, bearing ciphered letters commending his loyal intentions and showing that Dudley, hearing of Oliver's petition, had men lying in wait to kill him.

Thomas Wroth, having sent greetings to John Calvin through his friend François Hotman in November 1556, renewed his residency at Strasbourg on 1 September 1557, on the grounds that he could not return to England for reasons of religion. There he is said to have been 'very helpful to those of his godly countrymen among whom he dwelt, and particularly to Bartholomew Traheron, late Dean of Chichester.' Traheron dedicated a volume of the lectures that he read and had published there to Sir Thomas and Lady Wroth, styling them "exiles for Christ's cause". Other exiles at Strasbourg were listed by John Bale, who was at Basel "for the printing-presses". Lawrence Humphrey (an English theologian who had also remained abroad) dedicated to Wroth his lengthy treatise On Translation, Interpretatio Linguarum, at the suggestion of Edwin Sandys and Sir Francis Walsingham. François Hotman, who became involved in the Amboise conspiracy, dedicated to Wroth a volume of commentary upon De Actionibus. Both works were published at Basel in 1559.

== Return ==
Following Lewknor's death Queen Mary herself restored some lands to his widow. Immediately upon Elizabeth I's accession Wroth and Cooke returned to England, Wroth leaving a son in Hotman's care. On 29 December 1558 he was elected knight of the shire for Middlesex (which he again represented in the parliament of 1562–3). He soon sought a constat or exemplification as patentee in his life office of Waltham Forest, which Lord Rich had for his part surrendered and Mary had regranted to the recusant Sir Edward Waldegrave during Wroth's exile. Lewknor's heir Edward Lewknor, and his brothers and sisters, were restored in blood in March 1559.

On 21 August 1559 Wroth was appointed commissioner to visit the dioceses of Ely and Norwich. In June 1562 he was nominated a special commissioner (with which Sir Nicholas Arnold and Sir W. Dixie were associated) to consult with the Lord Deputy of Ireland, Thomas Radclyffe, 3rd Earl of Sussex, on the government of Ireland, and in particular to mediate in the bitter feud between Sussex and his colleague John Parker, but does not seem to have gone to Dublin (where he made reports upon church reform) until February 1564; he was recalled at his own request in August. Bishop Brady referred to Wroth's painstaking efforts. In 1569 he was commissioner for musters in Middlesex and for the lord-lieutenancy of London. He was assigned to the inquiry into the Papal Bull of Excommunication Regnans in Excelsis against Elizabeth posted in London in 1570, and tasked with the delivery of John Felton to the Lieutenant of the Tower for torture. He was also a commissioner in the case of John Story. On 1 September 1571 he was sent to take an inventory of Thomas Howard, 4th Duke of Norfolk's goods in the Charterhouse.

In May 1573 Wroth in person made a legal claim to the unpaid arrears of an annuity of £20 in respect of his appointment by Patent of Henry VIII as Gentleman-Usher of the Privy Chamber to Prince Edward, none of which he had ever received. It was decided that he should be paid for all the intervening years, since he had not defaulted upon his service to Prince Edward, and Henry's Patent had been binding upon the Body politic and not upon the natural bodies of Henry or his successors, whose demise came about by Act of God. The suit was awarded to him. Wroth dated his lengthy will on 5 October 1573, making Peter Osborne, Sir James Morrice, William Clerk and his brother William Wroth his executors, and adding a schedule or codicil on 9 October: all four were sworn at probate on 17 April 1575. He died on 9 October 1573: his wife Mary overlived him. His executors had to pursue the recovery of the arrears of his annuity.

John Ludham, vicar of Wethersfield, Essex, 1570–1613, dedicated his work The Course of Christianity (1579), a translation of the De Sacrae Scripturae Lectione ac Meditatione Quotidiana of Andreas Hyperius, to Lady Mary Wroth, Sir Thomas's widow.

== Family ==
Thomas Wroth and Mary Rich, daughter of Richard Rich, 1st Baron Rich, and wife Elizabeth Jenks (Gynkes), left sons as follows:

- Sir Robert Wroth (c. 1540–1606), married Susan, daughter and heiress of John Stonard of Loughton, Essex, through whom he acquired the estate of Loughton. They had at least four sons, the eldest of whom, Robert Wroth, was the husband of Mary Sidney, Lady Wroth (daughter of Robert Sidney, 1st Earl of Leicester), and the second, John, inherited the Enfield estate of Durrants.
- Richard Wroth (living 1573).
- Thomas Wroth, admitted student of the Inner Temple in November 1564. Having settled at Blendon Hall, Bexley, Kent, he died there in 1610. He married Joan, second daughter and heir of John or Thomas Bulman, and left, besides other issue, Sir Thomas Wroth (1584–1672) and Sir Peter Wroth (died 1644), father of Sir John Wroth, a member of the Inner Temple and scholar, from whose collections John Collinson derived the account of the family printed in his Somerset, and whose grandson John eventually succeeded to the Somerset property.
- Edward Wroth (living 1573)
- John Wroth (living 1573)
- Gerson Wroth, born in Germany, and naturalized by Parliament on 7 and 8 March 1558/9 (living 1573)
- Peter Wroth (living 1573)

and daughters:

- Mabell Wroth (1542–1579) married (1) (1560) Edward Aucher of Bishopsbourne, Kent (c. 1539–1568), son of Sir Anthony Aucher and Affra, daughter of William Cornwallis. Edward died in 1568. They had a son and a daughter. Bishopsbourne included the former seat of the Haute family, from whom Sir Thomas Wroth was himself descended. Mabell married (2) Richard Hardres (died 1612), son of Christopher Hardres of Hardres Court, Upper Hardres, Kent and his wife Dorothy (died 1533), daughter of Sir John Paston. Mabell's tomb at Upper Hardres identifies her as Wroth's daughter by inscription and heraldry and shows that she died in August 1579. Five sons (two of whom pre-deceased her) and two daughters are named.
- Judith Wroth married Robert Burgoyne of Wroxall, Warwickshire (died 1613), son of Robert Burgoyne and Elizabeth Mundon.
- Wynefred Wroth married Thomas Goddard, the son of Thomas Goddard (died 1550) of Clatford Hall and the manor of Lockeridge in West Overton, Wiltshire, lands which later came to the Wroth descendants. Thomas Goddard of Clatford sold Lockeridge to Richard Wroth in 1582. Thomas died in 1598, when his wife Winyfrithe, son Richard and daughters Mary, Anne, Constance and Elizabeth were all living, and asked to be buried at Preshute (in which Clatford stands).
- Elizabeth Wroth (died 1613) married (1) George Mynne (14 February 1530 – 1581) of Hertingfordbury, Hertfordshire, son of John Mynne (Auditor of the Exchequer, Clerk to the Surveyor General and Master of the Woods to Henry VIII and uncle of Nicholas Mynn) (died 14 December 1542 and will proven 1543) and Alice Standish. After his death Alice remarried to Francis Southwell. John Mynne and Elizabeth Wroth had three sons and three daughters. Their daughter Anne Mynne married George Calvert, 1st Baron Baltimore. Elizabeth married (2) Nicholas Boteler, Esquire.
- Anne Wroth (died c. 1623) married (as his second wife) Thomas Shurley or Shirley (died 1579) of Isfield, East Sussex, son of Edward Shurley (died 1558) and Joan Fenner of Isfield.
- Marie Wroth (died c. 1647) married (as his second wife) John Hussey, son of John Hussey of Slinfold and Cuckfield, Sussex (died 1572), and his wife Margaret Apsley. They had numerous issue, including Thomas Hussey senr., citizen and Grocer, alderman of London (died 1655), of Shere and Abinger in Surrey, father of Thomas Hussey junr., citizen and Grocer, of Hampstead (died 1671), alderman from 1661.
- Frances Wroth married Castell Carleton of Overstone, Northamptonshire, gent.

In addition to these, the Suffolk Pedigrees of David Elisha Davy refer to daughters Joan and Faith Wroth, and the Essex Visitations show a daughter Margery who married (1) Izack Hill and (2) Thomas Wyatt.

== Heraldry ==
The Wroth heraldry, 'Argent, on a bend sable three lions' heads erased of the field crowned or', is displayed on the tomb of Mabel Hardres.
