= John Wroth =

John Wroth may refer to:

- John Acton Wroth (1830–1876), convict transportee to the Swan River Colony, Australia
- John Wroth (mayor), Lord Mayor of London in 1360
- John Wroth (died 1396), MP for Middlesex and Wiltshire
- John Wroth (MP for City of London), 14th-century MP for City of London
- John Wroth (died 1407), MP for Middlesex (UK Parliament constituency)
- Sir John Wroth, 1st Baronet (1627–1664), English landowner
- Sir John Wroth, 2nd Baronet (1653–1677), of the Wroth baronets
- John Wroth (MP for Liverpool) (died after July 1616), MP for Liverpool (UK Parliament constituency) in 1593

== See also ==
- Wroth (surname)
