= Robert Wroth =

Robert Wroth may refer to:

- Robert Wroth (Middlesex MP) (1540–1606), English politician who was a member of 10 parliaments between 1563 and 1606
- Robert Wroth (died 1614), English MP for Newtown, IoW, 1601 and Middlesex, 1604
- Robert Wroth (Guildford MP) (1660–1720), English MP
