= Charles Tessier =

French composer

Charles Tessier (ca. 1550 – after 1604), also known as Carles Tessier, was a French composer and lutenist. The use of the name Carles suggests he was from the southern half of France, although there is uncertainty as to where he was born.

At the end of the 16th century he was in England where he made efforts to obtain a patron. It has been claimed that while in England he set sonnets from Astrophel and Stella dedicated to Lady Penelope Rich. A setting of "In a grove most rich of shade" was attributed to Tessier in Robert Dowland's song book A Musical Banquet. However, the songs in the 1597 collection which he published in London are not in English. The selection suggests that he was mainly looking to the continental market for sales. As printed by Thomas East, the songs are arranged for a vocal ensemble. However, some of them have also survived in manuscript as lute songs. (A comparable flexibility as regards performance options can be found in Dowland's First Book of Songs which appeared the same year).

== Published works ==
- Le premier livre de chansons & airs de cour (in the French, Italian and Gascon languages for 4 and 5 voices). London 1597.
- Airs et villanelles. Paris 1604.
- Dobbins, Frank (2006) Charles Tessier, Oeuvres completes/Complete Works: Chansons, Airs, Villanelles. Epitome musical . Brepols, Turnhout. ISBN 9782503515946
