= Sonnet sequence =

A sonnet sequence or sonnet cycle is a group of sonnets thematically unified to create a long work, although generally, unlike the stanza, each sonnet so connected can also be read as a meaningful separate unit.

The sonnet sequence was a very popular genre during the Renaissance, following the pattern of Petrarch. This article is about sonnet sequences as integrated wholes. For the form of individual sonnets, see Sonnet.

Sonnet sequences are typically closely based on Petrarch, either closely emulating his example or working against it. The subject is usually the speaker's unhappy love for a distant beloved, following the courtly love tradition of the troubadours, from whom the genre ultimately derived. An exception is Edmund Spenser's Amoretti, where the wooing is successful, and the sequence ends with an Epithalamion, a marriage song. The arrangement of the sonnets generally reflects thematic concerns, with chronological arrangements (whether linear, like a progression, or cyclical, like the seasons) being the most common. A sonnet sequence may also have allegorical or argumentative structures which replace or complement chronology.

Although many sonnet sequences at least pretend to be autobiographical, the genre became a very stylised one, and most sonnet sequences are better approached as attempts to create an erotic persona in which wit and originality plays with the artificiality of the genre. Thus one could regard the emotions evoked to be as artificial as the conventions with which they are presented.

While the thematic arrangement may reflect the unfolding of real or fictional events, the sonnet cycle is very rarely narrative; the narrative elements may be inferred, but provide background structure, and are never the primary concern of the poet's art.

== List of Italian sonnet sequences ==
- Dante Alighieri, La Vita Nuova (ca. 1293, 25 sonnets to Beatrice, with commentaries and other songs)
- Petrarch, Canzoniere (mid 14th-century, 227 sonnets to Laura, as well as 89 sonnets to Laura in death)

== List of English sonnet sequences ==
During the late 16th century and early 17th century a large number of sonnet sequences were written in English, the most notable of which include:

- Sir Philip Sidney, Astrophel and Stella (1591), 108 sonnets and 11 songs thought to be addressed to Lady Rich, written between 1580 and 1584.
- Edmund Spenser, Amoretti (1594), 89 sonnets and an epithalamion addressed to his wife, Elizabeth.
- Samuel Daniel, Delia (1592), 50 sonnets.
- Michael Drayton, Idea's Mirror (1594), 64 sonnets to Phoebe; later reworked as Idea (1619), 73 sonnets.
- Fulke Greville, Caelica (1633), 109 sonnets.
- Shakespeare Sonnets (1609), 154 sonnets to a variety of unnamed people, both male and female.
- Lady Mary Wroth, Pamphilia to Amphilanthus (1621), 83 sonnets, included in Urania.

Other English and Scottish sonnet collections and sequences of the period include:

- Anne Lok (Lock, or Locke), Meditation of a Penitent Sinner (1560), 26 sonnets of a devotional nature based on Psalm 51, the first known sonnet sequence in English.
- Thomas Watson, ΕΚΑΤΟΜΠΑΟΙΑ or Passionate Centurie of Love (1582), 100 'sonnets', most of which are of eighteen lines each, yet still emulating the general idea of Petrarch whom Watson had translated into Latin.
- Alexander Montgomerie (ca. 1580s), 70 Scots sonnets on miscellaneous personal, religious and political themes, many addressed to various persons, including James VI of Scotland.
- Thomas Lodge, 40 sonnets to Phillis (1593).
- Henry Constable, Diana (1592).
- William Percy, Sonnets to the fairest Coelia (1593).
- Anon., The Tears of Fancie (1593), 60 sonnets formerly attributed to Thomas Watson.
- Barnabe Barnes, Partenophil and Parthenophe (1593), 104 sonnets.
- Giles Fletcher, Licia (1593), 52 sonnets.
- Anon., Zepheria (1594), 40 sonnets by an unknown poet.
- Richard Barnfield (1595), 20 sonnets appended to his Cynthia.
- E.C. Esq., Emaricdulfe (1595), 40 sonnets.
- Bartholomew Griffin, Fidessa, more chaste than kind (1596), 62 sonnets.
- Richard Linche , Diella (1596), 39 sonnets.
- William Smith, Chloris (1596), 51 sonnets.
- Robert Tofte, Laura (1597), 40 sonnets.
- William Alexander of Menstrie (later Earl of Stirling), Aurora (1604), containing 125 lyrics of which 105 are sonnets.
- William Drummond, Poems (1616), 68 sonnets.

== Notable later sequences ==
During the 19th and 20th centuries, the sonnet sequence returned to favour, although with a greater variety of subject matter.

- Elizabeth Barrett Browning's Sonnets from the Portuguese (pubd. 1850, 44 sonnets to Robert Browning)
- Dante Gabriel Rossetti's The House of Life (1870, 1881, 101 sonnets)
- George Meredith's Modern Love (1862, 50 sixteen-line sonnets)
- Edna St. Vincent Millay's Sonnets from an Ungrafted Tree (1923), seventeen sonnets; the last line of each sonnet a heptameter
- H. P. Lovecraft's Fungi from Yuggoth (1930)
- John Berryman's Sonnets to Chris (1947, published 1967)
- Robert Lowell's Notebook (1969), revised and expanded into the three volumes History (1973), For Lizzie and Harriet (1973) and The Dolphin (1973).
- Wanda Coleman's American Sonnets (1994)
- William Wenthe's The Mysteries (pubd. 2004, 11 sonnets)
- Ernest Hilbert's Sixty Sonnets (2009) and All of You on the Good Earth (2013)
- Terrance Hayes' American Sonnets for My Past and Future Assassin (2018)

== See also ==
- Crown of sonnets
- Shakespeare's sonnets
- Sonneteer
