= Gamage =

- Gender: Unisex
- Language: Sinhala

Gamage is a Sinhalese or Welsh surname. Notable people with the surname include:

- Anoma Gamage, Sri Lankan politician
- Barbara Sidney, Countess of Leicester (1563–1621), Welsh heiress
- Chamila Gamage (born 1979), Sri Lankan cricketer
- Dharshana Gamage (born 1979), Sri Lankan cricketer
- Harry Gamage (1900–1994), American football coach
- Janak Gamage (born 1964), Sri Lankan cricketer
- K. A. Gamage (died 2009), Sri Lankan army officer
- Lahiru Gamage (born 1988), Sri Lankan cricketer
- Lal Dharmapriya Gamage, Sri Lankan architect and politician
- Lalith Gamage, Sri Lankan academic
- Lalith U. Gamage, Sri Lankan former provincial governor
- Piyasena Gamage (born 1949), Sri Lankan politician
- Saheli Rochana Gamage (born 1988), Sri Lankan singer
- Willy Gamage, Sri Lankan politician

== See also ==
- Gamages, London department store
- Gammage (disambiguation)
