= Pamphilia to Amphilanthus =

Sonnet sequence by Lady Mary Wroth

Pamphilia to Amphilanthus is a sonnet sequence by the English Renaissance poet Lady Mary Wroth, first published as part of The Countess of Montgomery's Urania in 1621, but subsequently published separately. It is the second known sonnet sequence by a woman writer in England (the first was by Anne Locke). The poems are strongly influenced by the sonnet sequence Astrophel and Stella (1580) penned by her uncle Sir Philip Sidney. Like Sidney's sequence, Wroth's sonnets passed among her friends and acquaintances in manuscript form before they were published in 1621. In Wroth's sequence, she upends Petrarchan tropes by making the unattainable object of love male (as opposed to female).

== Composition ==
Wroth began writing sonnets for the sequence as early as 1613, when the poet Josuah Sylvester referred to her poetry in his Lachrimae Lachrimarum. She composed, in total, 105 sonnets.

== Versions ==
Parts of the sequence appear in four versions: in the 1621 The Countess of Montgomeries Urania, the manuscript continuation of Urania, and Wroth's holograph manuscript held at the Folger Shakespeare Library. Nineteen sonnets are spread throughout the prose of the 1621 Urania, and eighty-three are printed in sequence at the back of the same volume. Three sonnets appear in the manuscript continuation of Urania. The holograph manuscript is the most comprehensive collection of the sequence. Five sonnets and one song in the Folger manuscript were not printed in the 1621 volume, while the fourth sonnet in the published sequence does not appear in the manuscript. Dramatic differences between versions consist of changes to punctuation in the 1621 version from that which appears in the manuscript; these changes were probably completed by Urania's printer Augustine Matthews.

== Content ==
The sonnet sequence is organized in four sections. In the first, fifty-five-poem section, Pamphilia determines her true feelings about her unfaithful lover, toward whom she is ambivalent throughout this section, though she affirms her choice to love Amphilanthus by its end. After a series of songs, the next section, of ten poems, takes on a darker tone as Pamphilia confronts doubt and jealousy, but the end of the sequence finds her seeking forgiveness from Cupid, the god of love, to whom she promises a crown of sonnets as penance for her doubt. The crown's fourteen sonnets form the sequence's third section. The final eight sonnets in the sequence comprise the fourth section, in which Pamphilia returns to a darker, melancholy tone, but understands that her suffering is necessary in order to understand the inner world of human emotion.

== Sonnet 7 ==
The seventh sonnet in Pamphilia to Amphilanthus supports Wroth's overarching themes of a woman's struggle in 17th century English society. The sonnet introduces female struggle between coercion and consent to a male lover. Bernadette Andrea's "Pamphilia's Cabinet: Gendered Authorship and Empire in Lady Mary Wroth's Urania" addresses the reasons why a female character would confront the reality of choosing between coercion and consent. One of the main aspects that Andrea approaches is the limits that the historical context put on the author's freedom of speech. Andrea states, "She may write, but only from the limits of her own room; she may preserve her writing, but only within the confines of her own mind". Sonnet 7 is Pamphilia's expression of her own thoughts, emotions and views.

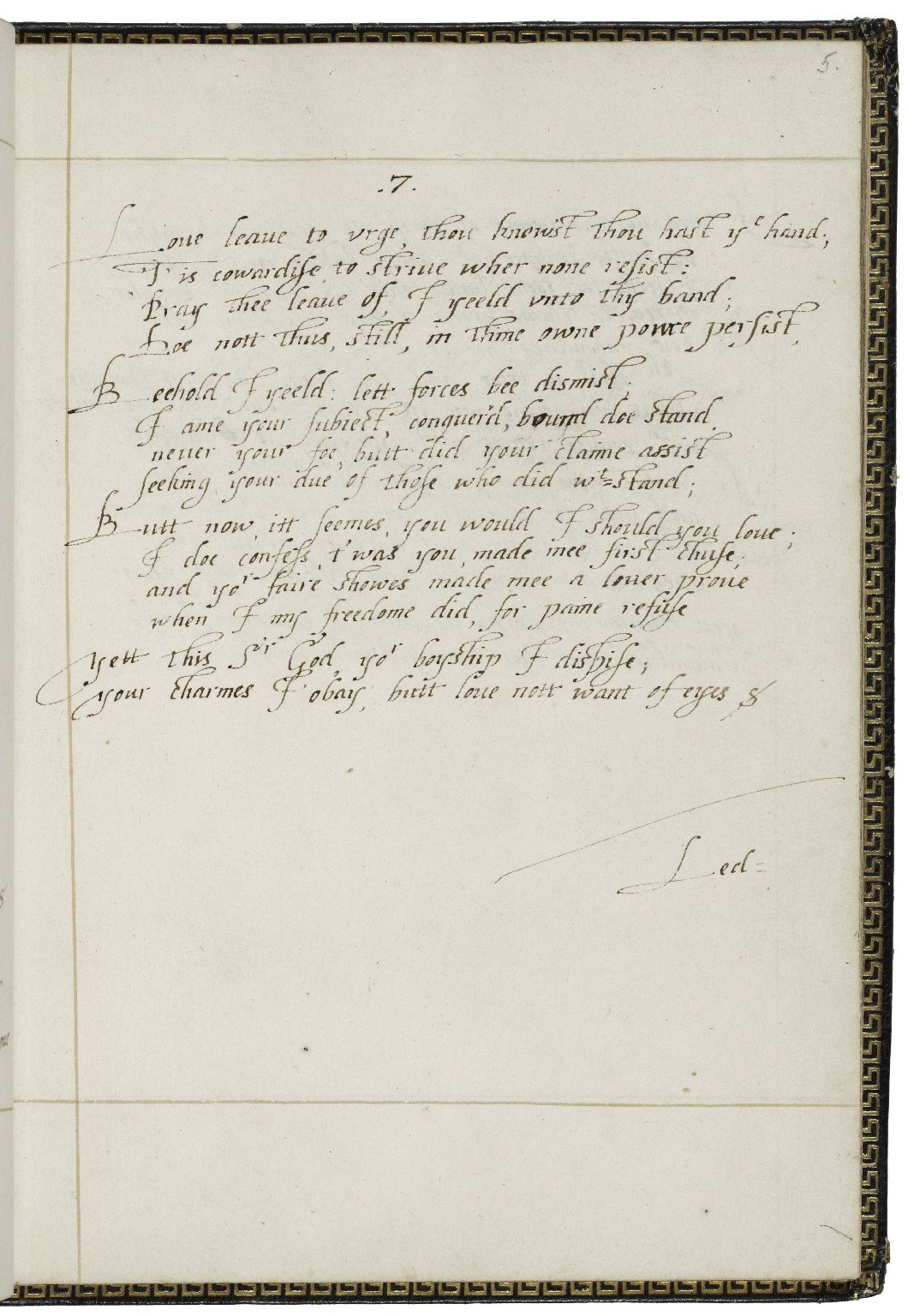
The seventh sonnet, from the only extant Pamphilia manuscript in Wroth's own hand.

The power of the patriarchal society on her views is evident. The influence is exemplified in line 6, "I am thy subject, conquered, bound to stand". Voicing her situation, Pamphilia feels subjected to male dominance. However, her desires are unclear on this matter because she says, "behold I yield", (5) as if a declaration of her choice to the relations with Amphilanthus. The idea of free choice for women would be classified as a protofeminist thought because they were grossly oppressed and not allowed to think for themselves.

[The following is a misapplication of Mullaney's ideas; or rather, the writer needs to explain how Wroth's work is akin to the ideological functions of the theater which are the actual subject of Mullaney's work]: Stephen Mullaney provides insight into the reason that Mary Wroth's work survived by stating, "What comes to reside in a wonder-cabinet are, in the most reified sense of the phrase, strange things: tokens of alien cultures, reduced to the status of sheer objects, stripped of cultural and human contexts in a way that makes them eminently capable of surviving the period that thus produced them". The social analysis of the survival of the oppressed writings comes from "Strange Things, Gross Terms, Curious Customs". The treatment of women caused Pamphilia to question whether she even has a choice in who she loves (consent) or if that is determined by society (coercion). Her inability to differentiate in the poem is probably due to the subjugation of inferior treatment that she has experienced. Mullaney refers to this as being "reduced to the status of sheer objects". She is forced to analyze if she is merely an object at the disposal of men. As a result, her ability to analyze, invoke higher level thinking, and even her personhood is examined.

Wroth's representation of female emotions conjured with the interaction with of a male suitor puts expected women's values into action. The sonnet explores the "obedience" attribute of what Bernadette Andrea refers to as the "triple injunction" of English culture in the 17th century. The "triple injunction" concept was communicated through many different forms including: educational tracts, religious sermons, and legal codes. Its purpose was to define the perfect woman as upholding social norms through the values of chastity, obedience, and silence. Pamphilia ends the sonnet resolving to "obey" (14) Amphilanthus' "charms", (14) regardless of her own wants. Her conclusion to persevere despite her personal feelings speaks to the cultural understanding of women heroism which is equated with endurance. Pamphilia does not concede all hope of having a choice in the relationship, but does wish to avoid physical hurt.

The sonnet does make an intriguing reference to Astrophel and Stella: in line 13 of the Petrarchan sonnet, Wroth writes, "…Sir God, your boyship I despise". The phrase "Sir God" is linked to the late 16th century poem, Astrophel and Stella. Sidney's Astrophel is referred to as "Sir Foole". According to Catherine Bates, Astrophel contracts similar difficulty as he, "is not only overmastered, the willing victim of a superior power, he is also emasculated". Perpetuating the gender roles of the time, Bates argues that Sidney paints Astrophel, a boy, as feminine. Wroth includes traces of Astrophel and Stella to provide ties to previous gender inequality. Astrophel only experiences the struggle between coercion, "overmastered", and consent, "willing", because he is cast as feminine. Bates's understanding of downward mobility in social status by moving from male to female through Sydney's Astrophel and Stella is strongly supported by Bernadette Andrea's analysis of social norms. Wroth's echo of Sydney's work is to address the gender issues from a new voice: the female perspective.

== Sonnet 22 ==
It is suggested that the line "Like to the Indians, scorched with the sun" recalls Wroth's role in Ben Jonson's Masque of Blackness (1605). This masque was designed by Inigo Jones and written for Queen Anne of Denmark. Gary Waller, in his book The Sidney Family Romance, explains that this masque was controversial because Wroth and the other female actors appeared in blackface as the twelve daughters of Niger.

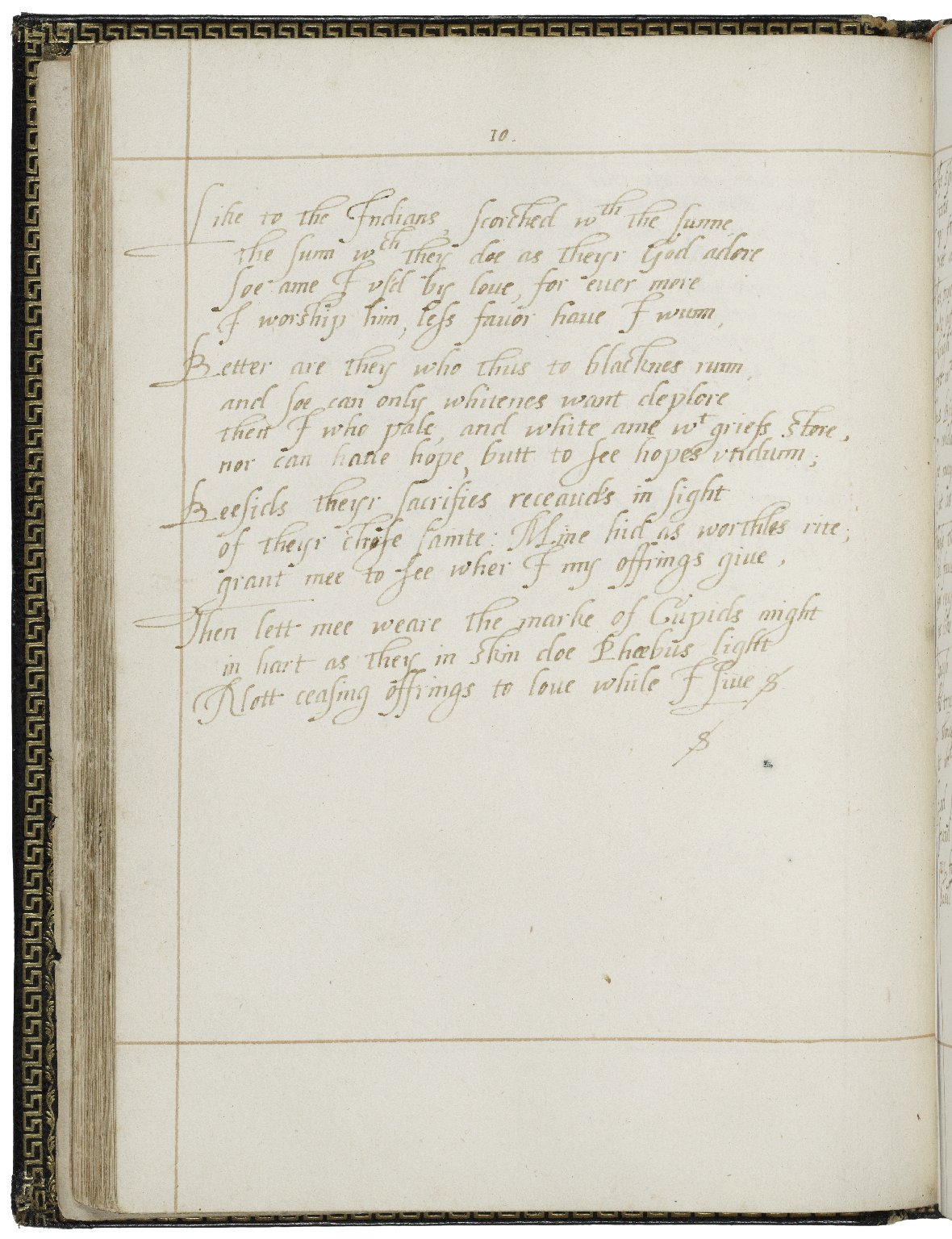
The 22nd sonnet, from the only extant Pamphilia manuscript in Wroth's own hand.

Anita Hagerman, in her article "'But Worth pretends': Discovering Jonsonian Masque in Lady Mary Wroth's Pamphilia to Amphilanthus", discusses Wroth's role in Jonson's The Masque of Blackness and the specific influence of the theme of darkness on Sonnet 22. She states that Wroth played a character named Baryte, an Ethiopian maiden. Hagerman suggests that Wroth created a courtly persona for herself in these masques and that the themes of this persona are themes in Pamphilia to Amphilanthus. One idea of Wroth's courtly persona was darkness, probably stemming from her reputation of seriousness. The theme of dark versus light is explored in Sonnet 22 and is representative of her uncertainty of whether she wants her desires for Amphilanthus to be fulfilled or not, because either way will prove "torturous".

The idea of theatricality influences the way this poem is interpreted. Because it is understood that Wroth is talking about her experience in a theatrical performance, the theme of the artificial aspect of the masque performance needs to be taken into account. Hagerman says that in the way that Pamphilia is ambivalent about what to do with her love for Amphilanthus, Wroth herself is ambivalent about the life of courtly masques. The contradiction of allowing women to have "feminine expressive display" of feelings and then strictly "enforced silence" could have represented the good and the bad of courtly life for Wroth. In the masques, Wroth was given a voice, but after she was no longer affiliated with the court life, she recognized the artificiality of the voice she had because the courtly life and the masques require a level of falseness. Gary Waller states that Wroth's female characters describe the pressure they feel in terms of theater and display. For a female to take part in a masque, she is creating the illusion of power because she is entering the space of the court and commanding attention. However, it subjects her to the gaze of men and makes her feel powerless and victimized.
