= Barbara Sidney, Countess of Leicester =

Welsh heiress

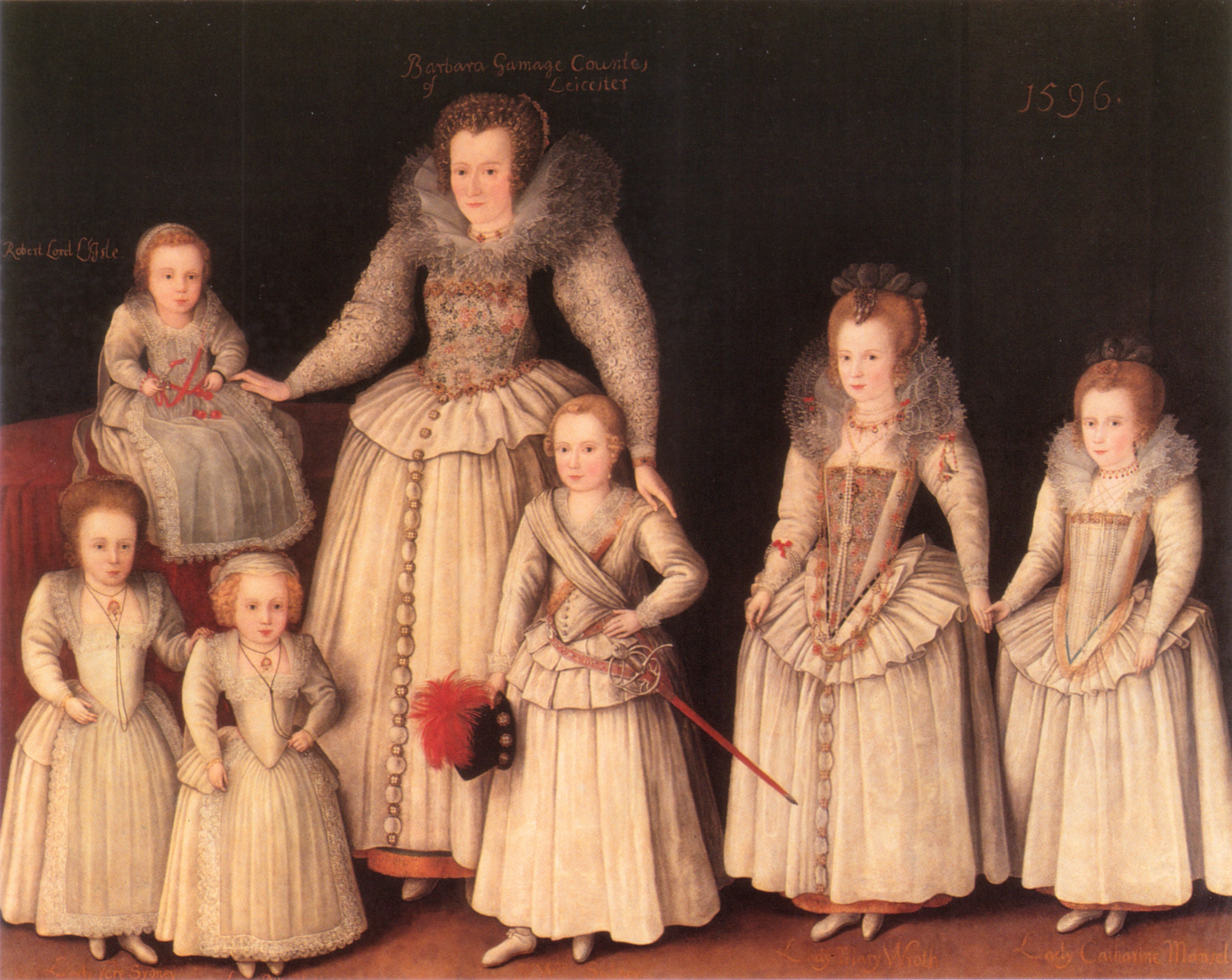
Barbara Sidney with six of her children, painted c. 1596 by Marcus Gheeraerts the Younger (1561–1636), collection of Viscount de Lisle, Penshurst Place

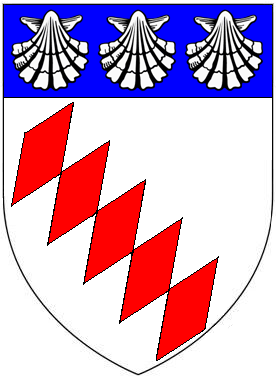
Arms of Gammage of Coity Castle, Glamorgan: Argent, five fusils in bend gules on a chief azure three escallops of the first.

Barbara Sidney, Countess of Leicester (1563 – 24 May 1621) was a Welsh heiress, and the first wife of Robert Sidney, 1st Earl of Leicester. Her family connections tied her to prominent contemporary figures such as Sir Walter Raleigh.

== Origins ==
Barbara was the sole child and heiress of John Gamage (d. 1584), of Coity Castle, Glamorgan, and his wife, Gwenllian. On the death of her father in September 1584 she was granted by the crown in wardship to Sir Edward Stradling of St Donat's Castle, Glamorgan, until her marriage. Her aunt Margaret (née Gamage), her father's sister, who was the first wife of William Howard, 1st Baron Howard of Effingham, wrote to Stradling in the late 1570s to thank him and his wife Agnes, who was responsible for teaching Barbara to run a household.

== Marriage ==
As an heiress, Barbara Gamage was much sought after in marriage, and at least three of her relations were among her suitors: Thomas Jones of Abermarlis, Sir James Whitney, and Herbert Croft. Lord Burghley, who disapproved of the Stradlings being appointed her guardians, favoured Croft, whose grandfather, Sir James, was controller of her household of Queen Elizabeth I of England; Sir James claimed that the Stradlings had given their written permission for such a marriage. Barbara, when she came of age, was forbidden to contract a marriage without the queen's consent. However, Francis Walsingham, another of the queen's close advisors, had married his daughter to Sir Philip Sidney, and favoured a match between Barbara Gamage and Sir Philip's brother Robert Sidney. The story of their romance was later recorded by one of their children, Mary Sidney, Lady Wroth, in The Countesse of Mountgomeries Urania, published in 1621, the year of her mother's death.

On 23 September 1584, she married Robert Sidney (created Earl of Leicester in 1616), at St Donat's Castle, the home of her guardian. Although Sidney was the Member of Parliament for Glamorgan, the couple lived chiefly at Baynard's Castle in London and at Penshurst Place in Kent, and the latter house was extended under Barbara's direction, replicating features from her former home at St Donat's.

Sidney's letters to his wife, written when he was away from home on official business, have been published, and contain information about household details, the court of Anne of Denmark, and news of major events. Her letters to him have not survived.

According to the editor of Ben Jonson's poem "To Penshurst", the "My Lady's Oak" and "Gamage copse" mentioned in the poem are references to Barbara Sidney. According to tradition, she "was taken in travail [labour] under an oak in Penshurst Park, which was afterwards called My Lady's Oak ", and it is also said that she liked to feed the deer under the shade of the copse. The forested area became known as "Lady Gamage's Bower".

She sent peaches to King James, Anne of Denmark, and the Earl of Pembroke, Lord Chamberlain, in September 1616 and 1617.

== Children ==
Robert and Barbara had eleven children:

- Mary (1587–1651/3), who married Robert Wroth
- Catherine (1589—1616), who married Sir Lewis Mansel.
- Sir William Sidney (1590–1613)
- Henry Sidney (1591)
- Elizabeth (1592—1605)
- Philippa (1594—1620), who married Sir John Hobart, 2nd Baronet
- Robert Sidney, 2nd Earl of Leicester (1595–1677)
- Bridget (1597—99)
- Alice (1598—99)
- Barbara (1599–1635), who married Thomas Smythe, 1st Viscount Strangford, in April 1619.
- Vere (1602—06)
