= Astrophel and Stella =

Sonnet sequence by Philip Sidney

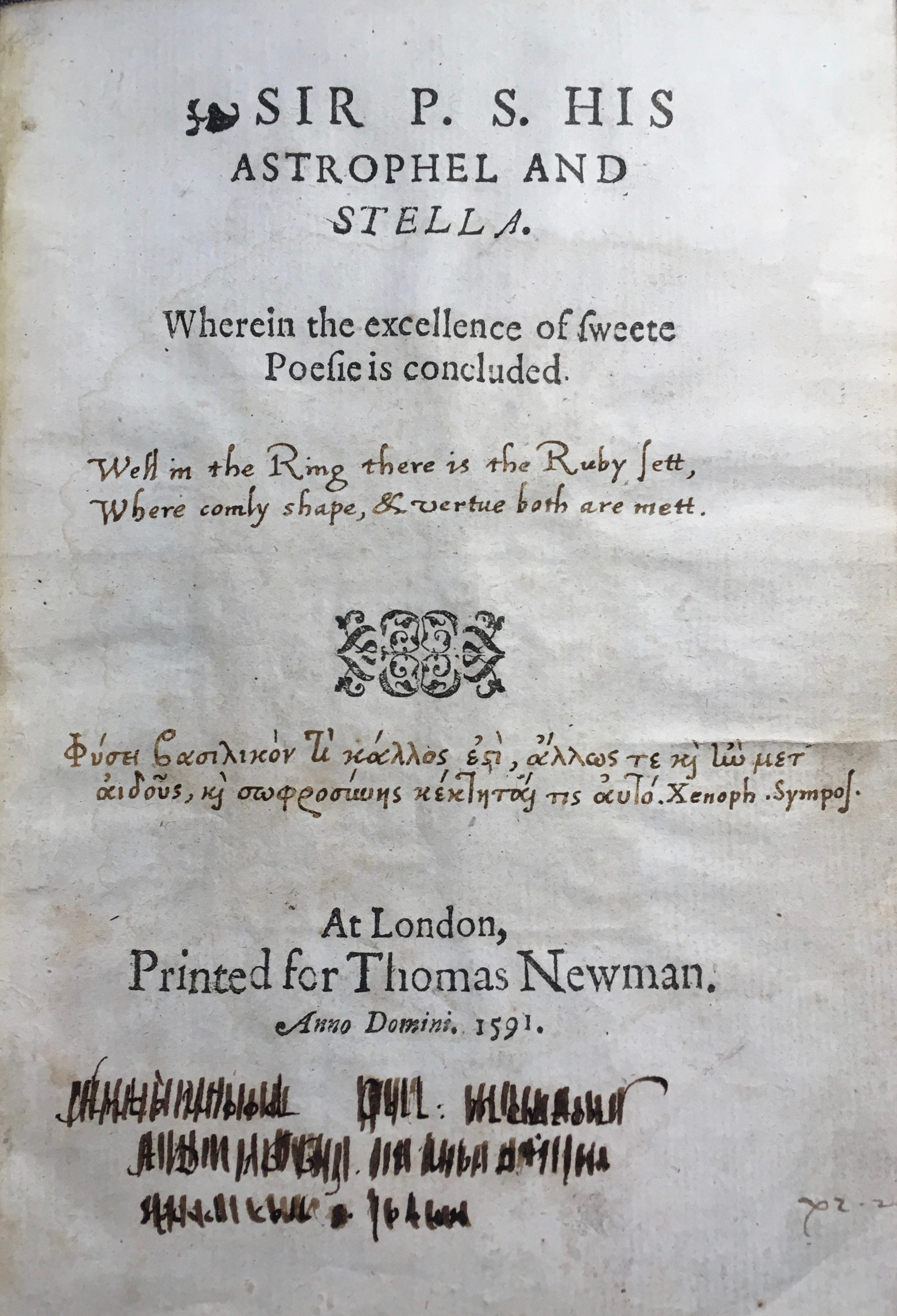
The title page of the second edition of Astrophil and Stella (1591), from the British Library's holdings

Astrophil and Stella is an English sonnet sequence by Philip Sidney containing 108 sonnets and 11 songs, probably composed in the 1580s. The name derives from the two Greek words, 'aster' (star) and 'phil' (lover), and the Latin word 'stella' meaning star. Thus Astrophil is the star lover, and Stella is his star. Sidney partly nativized the key features of his Italian model Petrarch, including an ongoing but partly obscure narrative, the philosophical trappings of the poet in relation to love and desire, and musings on the art of poetic creation. Sidney also adopts the Petrarchan rhyme scheme, though he uses it with such freedom that fifteen variants are employed.

Some have suggested that the love represented in the sequence may be a literal one as Sidney evidently connects Astrophil to himself and Stella to Lady Penelope, thought to be Penelope Devereux (1563–1607), later Lady Rich, the wife of Robert Rich, 3rd Baronet. Sidney and Lady Penelope had been betrothed when the latter was a child. For some reason the match was broken off, and Lady Penelope married Lord Rich, with whom she lived for a while most unhappily. Payne and Hunter suggest that modern criticism, though not explicitly rejecting this connection, leans more towards the viewpoint that writers happily create a poetic persona, artificial and distinct from themselves.

== Publishing history ==
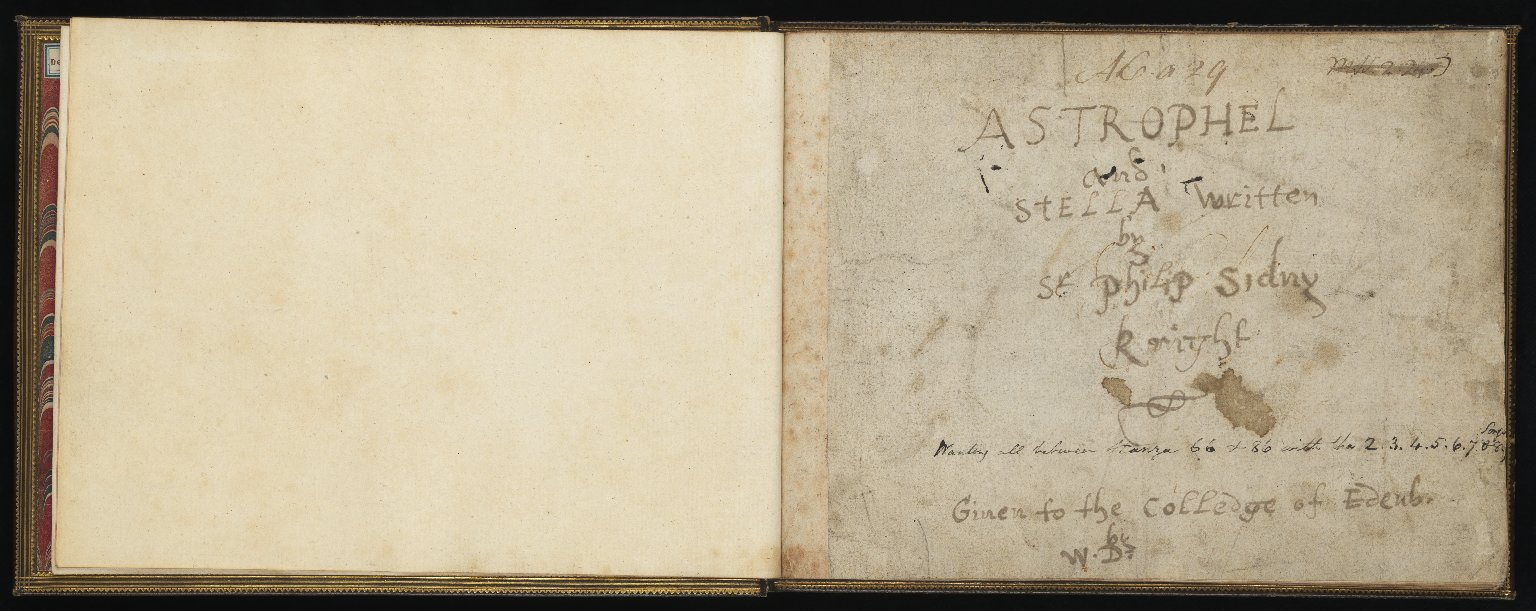
Frontispiece to copy of Astrophel and Stella from University of Edinburgh Library.

Many of the poems were circulated in manuscript form before the first edition was printed by Thomas Newman in 1591, five years after Sidney's death. This edition included ten of Sidney's songs, a preface by Thomas Nashe and verses from other poets including Thomas Campion, Samuel Daniel and the Earl of Oxford. The text was allegedly copied down by a man in the employ of one of Sidney's associates, thus it was full of errors and misreadings that eventually led to Sidney's friends ensuring that the unsold copies were impounded. Newman printed a second version later in the year, and though the text was more accurate it was still flawed. The version of Astrophil and Stella commonly used is found in the folio of the 1598 version of Sidney's Arcadia. Though still not completely free from error, this was prepared under the supervision of his sister the Countess of Pembroke and is considered the most authoritative text available. All known versions of Astrophil and Stella have the poems in the same order, making it almost certain that Sidney determined their sequence.

A copy of the original manuscript, made by Sir Edward Dymoke, has been held by the University of Edinburgh Library since the 1620s.

== Astrophel vs. Astrophil ==
The Oxford University Press collection of Sidney's major works has this to say about the title:

There is no evidence that the title is authorial. It derives from the first printed text, the unauthorized quarto edition published by Thomas Newman (1591). Newman may also have been responsible for the consistent practice in early printings of calling the lover persona 'Astrophel'. Ringler emended to 'Astrophil' on the grounds of etymological correctness, since the name is presumably based on the Greek aster philein, and means 'lover of a star' (with Stella meaning 'star'); the 'Phil' element alluding also, no doubt, to Sidney's Christian name.

== Musical settings ==
- Three of the eleven songs have settings for voice with bass and lute accompaniment in A Musical Banquet, 1610, published by Robert Dowland.
- The eighth song, In a Grove Most Rich of Shade, was set by Charles Tessier.
- The sixth and tenth songs were set by William Byrd in Psalmes, Sonnets and Songs and Songs of sundrie natures, respectively.
- The second song, Have I caught my Heavenly Jewel, was set anonymously for lute and voice in British Library Add. MS 15117, c.1614-1630.
- The ninth song, Goe my Flocke, and the tenth song, O Deere Life when shall it be, have anonymous settings.

== See also ==
- Sonnet sequence
- English Renaissance
- 1591 in poetry, the year of the first edition
- 1598 in poetry, the year of the more authoritative, revised edition
