= The Countess of Montgomery's Urania =

17th-century prose romance by Lady Mary Wroth

The Countess of Montgomery's Urania, also known as Urania, is a prose romance by English Renaissance writer Lady Mary Wroth. Composed at the beginning of the 17th century, it is the first known prose romance written by an English woman. The full work exists in two volumes, the first published in 1621 and the second written, but unpublished, during Wroth's lifetime. The novel also contains several versions of Wroth's sonnet sequence Pamphilia to Amphilanthus, distributed throughout the prose and reproduced in sequence at the end of the volume.

== Composition ==
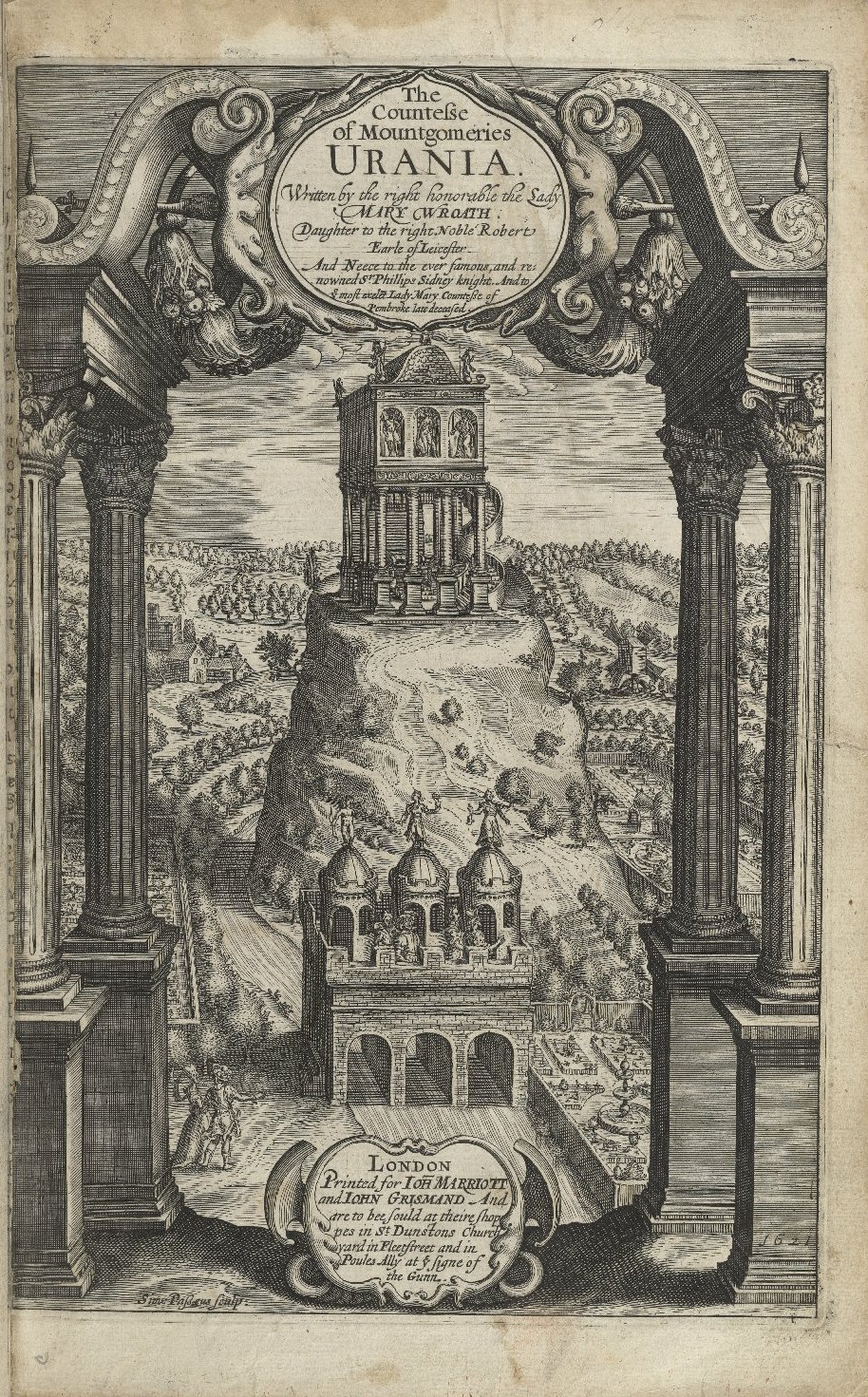
The title page of Urania, engraved by Simon van de Passe.

The precise dates for Urania's composition are unknown, but Wroth probably began writing the first volume between 1615 and 1620. Initially, it was written for the enjoyment of Wroth's family circle, and could have been composed, in part, at the home of William Herbert, 3rd Earl of Pembroke, in London. The early manuscript of Urania may have circulated amongst Wroth's household, family, and friends as evening entertainment; if so, their responses to the text aided her revision of the manuscript.

=== Sources ===
Sources for Urania include Wroth's uncle Philip Sidney's The Countess of Pembroke's Arcadia. Wroth may have drawn the name of her work's title from the Arcadia, as one of its significant characters is named "Urania." Other literary sources include Edmund Spenser's The Faerie Queene and Ludovico Ariosto's Orlando Furioso. Anthony Munday's English translation of Amadis de Gaule, published in 1618 and 1619, may have also been a major source for Wroth. The romance inspired several of Urania's plotlines, including the Throne of Love sequence near the beginning of the work. Wroth also drew heavily on the political and social world around her, and many of the work's storylines have connections to Wroth's family, court life, and historical events of the early 17th century.

== Publication ==
John Marriott and John Grismand entered Urania into the Stationers' Register on 13 July 1621. Wroth had loose connections to Marriott and Grismand through her cousin William Herbert, Earl of Pembroke. Herbert was a patron of George Wither, whose Wither's Motto: Nec habeo, nec careo, nec curo prompted his, Marriott's, and Grismand's arrest, along with printer Augustine Matthews', in early 1621. On 4 June 1621 the printer and publishers were fined for the publication of Motto; Marriott and Grismand spent some time in Marshalsea, and were released on 10 July, three days before entering Urania into the Stationers' Register.

The edition was printed by Matthews. His work was identified based on the type and printer's ornaments used, borrowed from his contemporary Felix Kingston. He may have shared the book's printing with his partner John White. Matthews may have been confused by Wroth's abrupt midsentence ending of Urania, and left the remainder of the final page blank, perhaps in the hopes that he would eventually receive material to complete the volume. This is in contrast to the way he printed the end of the first three parts of Urania, which are decorated with a printer's ornament and an announcement, in italic type, declaring "the end of the first Booke," etc. Matthews printed a small number of copies before Wroth's attempted to withdraw the volume from circulation. Twenty-nine of those seventeenth-century copies survive to today.

The title page was engraved by Simon van de Passe. Van de Passe had minor connections to Wroth and her family, as he painted several portraits of members of Wroth's relatives, including her aunt Mary Sidney, the Countess of Pembroke. The content-specific nature of the title page is unusual for the time, and may signal Wroth's intention to publish Urania. The title page's design and dedication resemble those of the Arcadia, and indicate Wroth's attempt to insert herself into the family literary canon.

The level of Wroth's involvement in its publication is unknown. Marriott and Grismand could have acquired a copy of her manuscript without Wroth's knowledge, but in a letter to George Villiers, Wroth does not deny knowing of its publication. She may have circulated her manuscript among aristocratic friends to encourage its distribution to publishers. This strategy would yield publication of the novel, while allowing her to avoid the aristocratic stigma against those who circulated their work in print. Given the specificity of her corrections in her own copy of Urania, Wroth probably intended to have her work printed, though she may not have personally instigated the process through direct contact with publishers.

== Content ==
The sprawling romance follows the political and romantic adventures of several imaginary royal and noble families. The work contains over a thousand characters, and spirals into hundreds of subsidiary plotlines, which are interspersed with Wroth's sonnet sequence Pamphilia to Amphilanthus. The work is largely centred on the relationship between Queen Pamphilia and Emperor Amphilanthus; their meetings are surrounded by storylines involving their various siblings, and many other tertiary characters. While Wroth may not have intended to write Urania as a roman à clef, many of the work's storylines and characters have strong parallels to events and people in Wroth's life.

One of the most notable storylines connected to Wroth's life is that of the romance between Pamphilia and Amphilanthus, who serve as avatars for Wroth and her cousin William Herbert, respectively. The romance identifies Pamphilia and Amphilanthus as first cousins, as were Wroth and Herbert. In the novel, Pamphilia meets with Amphilanthus' mother, the Queen of Naples; the Queen subsequently approves of the couple's relationship, indicating Wroth's ambition that her aunt Mary Sidney, Countess of Pembroke, would give the real-world couple her blessing. In the manuscript continuation of Urania, the appearance of two illegitimate children, Andromarko and Faire Design, is closely tied to the birth of Katherine and William, Wroth's natural children fathered by Herbert. The manuscript continuation also blatantly reveals the cousins' relationship, which may have prevented Wroth from pursuing its publication. In the revelatory passage, Wroth attributes the romance's reproduction of one of Herbert's poems to Amphilanthus, which strikingly exposes the connection between herself, Herbert, and Urania's characters.

== Themes in Urania ==
Urania introduced controversial themes concerning gender. Wroth was a radical in her time merely for writing a work intended for public consumption. For the time, the act of composing a novel by a woman violated the ideals of female virtue. Bernadette Andrea, a literary critic who focuses on gender themes in Urania in her work "Pamphilia's Cabinet: Gendered Authorship and Empire in Lady Mary Wroth's Urania", writes that female virtues at the time were seen to be silence and obedience. In genteel society, an unmarried woman of the time was expected to be chaste, silent, and obedient and this theme is reiterated throughout contemporary religious works, legal treaties, and literature. The three themes were considered linked: a woman's silence and obedience were considered evidence of her chastity. By writing a text intended for a public audience, critics like Andrea claim that Wroth was acting against the accepted ideals of the established patriarchy and so calling her own moral character into question.

Urania is the titular character of the work, but is not the character that represents Wroth in the work. In the work, Urania is an orphan and is the daughter of a shepherd. She is actually the biological offspring of the daughter of the King of Naples, and comes to this realization over the course of the work through a series of pastoral songs and sonnets with the shepherds. Pamphilia, as Wroth's representative, is the female character who most struggles with the mindset of the contemporary world in which Wroth wrote. Pamphila, which is Greek for all loving, struggles throughout the text with the infidelity of her lover Amphialanthus, which is Greek for "one with two loves." Pamphilia must conceal her songs so that her moral character is not called into question by others in Urania. Pamphila carries around her works in a little cabinet and keeps them to herself because society would shun them. She is however, rewarded in the work for her actions. She becomes a queen in Asia Minor despite her lack of the contemporary virtues of silence, chastity, and obedience. Her compositions, although mostly secret, are still a violation of the code of what a woman should be. Wroth does not demonize, but glorifies, her transgression.

== Reception ==
The two published responses to Urania in the 1620s favour the work and associate Wroth with the Sidney family's literary canon. Henry Peacham, in the 1622 The Compleat Gentleman, names her “an inheretrix of the Divine wit of her immortal Uncle” after reading Urania. In 1624, Thomas Heywood includes Wroth, along with her aunt Mary Sidney, in Gynaikeion: or, Nine Books of Various History Concerning Women. Urania also seems to have been read by aristocratic women in the time of its publication, as a copy entered the library of the Countess of Bridgewater in 1627. Later in the seventeenth century, Margaret Cavendish references Wroth and her works in “To All Noble, and Worthy Ladies,” in her 1664 Poems and Phancies.

Other responses, however, were much less positive, especially those of the aristocracy, who seemed to take issue with the use of her contemporaries as inspiration. The exact nature of that inspiration has not been fully defined by contemporary scholars. Virginia Woolf claimed that any woman who composed a work of fiction during the period of the Renaissance would be "thought a monster". One of her contemporaries claims that the "whole world condemns" her work. Given the references cited above, this sentiment was certainly not universal, but aristocratic society rejected the book out of hand as shameful gossip by a sinful woman whose error consisted of writing a book containing her thoughts.

After her altercation with Sir Edward Denny, Wroth wrote to George Villiers, claiming that the work was published against her will and that she had already made efforts to stop it from being sold. In the letter, Wroth requests that Villiers return his copy of the book to her. Wroth may have attempted to remove Urania from circulation, but there is no record of an official warrant recalling the book.

=== Edward Denny ===
The most well-known of contemporary reactions to Urania was Sir Edward Denny's, who responded intensely to what he perceived as his negative representation in the novel. Satirizing Denny insulted a man whose heritage was tied up with Wroth's. The Dennys lived near Wroth in Essex, and were important local figures in the region that is now known as Epping Forest. The Wroths were based in Loughton and Denny a few miles away in Waltham Abbey. Denny's father, also named Edward, worked closely with the Sidneys in Ireland and with Wroth's father-in-law, Sir Robert Wroth.

Denny objected to a story narrated by one of the novel's shepherds, which detailed the marriages of a melancholy character named Sirelius. Sirelius falls in love with an aristocrat's only daughter, purportedly desiring her love, but upon marriage, quickly becomes jealous and accuses his wife of adultery with another young lord; his false speculations are compounded by the discovery of letters to the lord in his wife's cabinets. In response to her husband's jealously, the aristocrat attempts to kill his daughter, who now requires Sirelius' protection. This event catalyzes their reconciliation, and the couple have a son and a daughter before she dies. Sirelius then marries the daughter of a Romanian duke, and his new father-in-law attempts to prevent the marriage by locking up his daughter.

For this storyline, Wroth seems to have drawn upon the lives of Denny, his daughter Honoria, James Hay, Lucy Percy Hay, and Lucy's father, the Earl of Northumberland. Honoria, Denny's only daughter, married Sir James Hay on 6 January 1607. They were married until August 1614, when Honora miscarried and died from complications thereof. There is no extant evidence of any marital troubles between James and Honora, but Hay was occasionally in conflict with Wroth's brother Robert, during which he proved to have a violent temper. This indicates that Wroth may have satirized him as Sirelius, which would tie Honora Hay and her father into Urania's plotline. Wroth may have been privy to some scandalous gossip through her friendship with Lucy Percy Hay, Hay's second wife; she was known for her stories and satirical, anonymous portraits of members of court. Lucy's marriage is clearly represented in this portion of Urania, as Lucy Percy's father, Henry Percy, attempted to prevent her marriage to Hay in 1617 by keeping her with him in the Tower of London, where he was imprisoned for purported involvement in the Gunpowder Plot.

Denny retaliated against Urania's implications by circulating his own satirical poem about Wroth, in which he labels her a "hermaphrodite in show, in deed a monster." Denny also accuses her of madness and unchastity, and concluded his satire with a condemnation of women who write fiction. Wroth acquired a copy of the poem on 15 February 1622 and fired back immediately with a poem of her own. In it, she accuses him of drunkenness and venery, returns his "hermaphrodite" insult, and names him a "lying wonder." She also makes unspecified threats of further courses of action against Denny. Denny returned a letter to Wroth on 26 February 1622, in which he intimates that her book has been largely condemned by the court, and urges her to turn toward translating psalms in the manner of her "virtuous and learned aunt" Mary Sidney. Wroth's 27 February letter to Denny shows her attempts to backpedal from any connections in Urania to herself and others at court. In this letter, she also proposes Denny bring her accusers before her in order for her to prove her full innocence. Denny closes the extant correspondence with an affirmation that he will not engage her further, and that he intended to do her no more wrong. The Dennys and Wroths may have eventually rekindled their relationship, as Wroth served as executrix of a will in 1636 along with a Denny relative.

=== Modern reception ===
There are no extant eighteenth-century references to Urania. Study of the work resurfaces in the nineteenth century in Alexander Dyce's 1825 Specimens of British Poetesses, in which Dyce reproduces two poems from Pamphilia to Amphilanthus and lists Urania as their source. Later in the nineteenth century, Urania was referenced as an inferior version of the Arcadia in an 1890 history of the English novel by J. J. Jusserand.

== Manuscript continuation ==
Wroth composed the second volume of Urania between 1620 and 1630. Currently held at the Newberry Library, Wroth's holograph manuscript was probably a working copy, as it contains a variety of corrections and additions. The manuscript ends midsentence, as does the text in the first volume of Urania, though this may have been unintentional, since the final leaf in the manuscript does not have a "Finis" or any other concluding marks that marked the end of the other volume. The manuscript continuation has about 240,000 words. The manuscript also contains a missing bifolio that leaves unknown part of Amphilanthus' journey in this volume. The folio was probably removed after Wroth completed the manuscript, and eliminated by either Wroth herself or William Herbert based on concern that a page affirming the consummation of the relationship between Pamphilia and Amphilanthus would publicly affirm the relationship between the cousins. Other signs that the manuscript is unfinished include incomplete plot lines and blank spaces to fill in either characters' names or poems.

=== Narrative changes ===
Volume two generally follows a "second generation" of characters descended from those that appear in the first volume, though some characters from the preceding volume, like Pamphilia to Amphilanthus, also appear. In this volume, the geographic setting expands to include Persia and Babylon, referring respectively to Iran and Iraq. Rather than exploring the dynastic fates of "European" monarchies, Wroth shifts her characters' destinies to the East, where many of her second-generation characters find themselves ruling. This second part resists the purported united between East and West set up by Wroth in the first volume, as characters displaced into the East are never reunited or reconnected with the West via marriage or, simply, return. Part Two's resistance to Islam may also reinforce the conceit of separation, as Wroth only uses pre-Islamic names for her settings and pits Islam against Christianity in elaborate battle narratives. This anti-Muslim sentiment is corroborated by a general reassertion of European aggression toward Islam in the sixteenth and seventeenth centuries, founded on the Ottoman Empire's encroaching deeper into Europe. Despite these "epic encounters" between Christianity and Islam, the second volume of Urania is more pessimistic about the prominence of the former than the first volume; characters generally achieve momentary, but not lasting, happiness in their private and public lives.

== Modern edition ==
After its initial publication in 1621, Urania remained out of print until the end of the 20th century. A scholarly edition was published in 1995 and edited by Josephine Roberts, and an edition of the manuscript continuation of Urania, edited by Roberts, Suzanne Gossett, and Janel Mueller was published in 1999. In a 2015 essay, Sheila T. Cavanagh, a professor at Emory University, proposed an online, crowdsourced classroom edition of Urania. It is not known whether its development currently exists beyond this proposal.

== Secondary sources ==
- Andrea, Bernadette Diane (2001). "Pamphilia's Cabinet: Gendered Authorship and Empire in Lady Mary Wroth's Urania". ELH. 68 (2): 335–358. doi:10.1353/elh.2001.0011. S2CID 162808649. Project MUSE 11519.
- Cavanagh, Sheila T. Cherished Torment: The Emotional Geography of Lady Mary Wroth's Urania. Pittsburgh: Duquesne University Press, 2001.
- Hannay, Margaret P. Mary Sidney, Lady Wroth. Farnham, Surrey, England: Ashgate, 2010.
- Lamb, Mary Ellen (2004). "Wroth [née Sidney], Lady Mary (1587?–1651/1653), author". Oxford Dictionary of National Biography. Oxford Dictionary of National Biography (online ed.). Oxford University Press. doi:10.1093/ref:odnb/30082. ISBN 978-0-19-861412-8. (Subscription, Wikipedia Library access or UK public library membership required.)
- Larson, Katherine Rebecca, Naomi J. Miller, and Andrew Strycharski, eds. Re-reading Mary Wroth. New York, NY: Palgrave Macmillan, 2015.
- Salzman, Paul (1978). "Contemporary References in Mary Wroth's Urania". The Review of English Studies. 29 (114): 178–181. doi:10.1093/res/XXIX.114.178. JSTOR 514603.
- Salzman, Paul. Reading Early Modern Women's Writing. Oxford: Oxford University Press, 2006.
- Waller, Gary F. The Sidney Family Romance: Mary Wroth, William Herbert, and the Early Modern Construction of Gender. Detroit: Wayne State University Press, 1993.
- Wroth, Mary. The First Part of The Countess of Montgomery's Urania. Edited by Josephine A. Roberts. Binghamton, NY: Center for Medieval and Early Renaissance Studies, State University of New York at Binghamton, 1995.
- Wroth, Mary. The Second Part of the Countess of Montgomery's Urania. Edited by Josephine A. Roberts, Suzanne Gossett, and Janel M. Mueller. Tempe, AZ: Renaissance English Text Society in Conjunction with Arizona Center for Medieval and Renaissance Studies, 1999.
