= Gammage =

Gammage can refer to:

- Johnny Gammage (died 1995), American motorist who died in police custody
- Grady Gammage (1892–1959), American university president
- Robert Gammage (born 1938), American politician
- The Gammage Cup, Newbery Honor-winning children's book
- Gammage Auditorium, building on the campus of Arizona State University named for Grady Gammage

== See also ==
- Gamage, a surname
