= Sir John Wroth, 1st Baronet =

English landowner (1627–1664)

Sir John Wroth (1627–1664) was an English landowner.

He was the son of Sir Peter Wroth of Blendon (d. 1644) and Margaret, daughter of Sir Anthony Dering (d. 1636) of Surrenden Dering in Pluckley, Kent.

His home was Blendon Hall near Bexley in Kent. He was made a baronet on 29 November 1660.

In May 1650 he married Anne Caulfield, widow of Sir Paul Harris and Sir Ralph Gore. Some sources say Anne was the daughter of William Caulfield, others that her father was William's uncle Toby Caulfeild, 1st Baron Caulfeild of Charlemont in Ireland.

Wroth contributed to a family history in manuscript. He wrote that his great-grandfather Sir Thomas Wroth was Groom of the Stool to Edward VI. He had his portrait painted by Robert Walker in 1651, and Samuel Cooper painted a miniature of his bride Anne just before their wedding. In 1651 Peter Lely painted her portrait "in great" for ten shillings.

== Family ==
- Thomas Wroth (1651-1671)
- Sir John Wroth, 2nd Baronet (1653–1677)
- Henry Wroth
- Sophia Wroth

Baronetage of England
| New creation | Baronet (of Blenden Hall); 1660–1664 | Succeeded by John Wroth |
