= A Musical Banquet =

Song book from 1610 by Robert Dowland

A Musical Banquet is a book of songs compiled by Robert Dowland, son of the more famous lutenist and composer John Dowland, in 1610. Since Robert was only about 19 at the time, the book was probably significantly influenced by his father.

Unlike most songbooks published in England at the time, A Musical Banquet includes songs in languages other than English. The full title of the book is A Musicall Banquet. Furnished with varietie of delicious Ayres, Collected out of the best Authors in English, French, Spanish and Italian. The gastronomic metaphor continues in the introduction, where Dowland promises the reader a "careful confectionary ... for all tastes". The book is dedicated to Sir Robert Sydney, who was Robert Dowland's godfather.

There are ten songs in English, of which three are by John Dowland, including one of his best known pieces, "In darkness let me dwell", written in his characteristic intense melancholy style, with complex rhythms and chromaticism. The other English composers represented include Anthony Holborne, Daniel Bacheler and Richard Martin. Some of the texts are poems written by Sir Philip Sidney, the brother of the dedicatee, including one setting in English by the French composer Charles Tessier. Most of the ten songs in other languages are anonymous, although two are attributed to Giulio Caccini.

Each song consists of a Cantus line, a lute accompaniment, and a bass line that may be sung or played on an instrument such as a viola da gamba.
