= Robert Sidney, 1st Earl of Leicester =

English noble and diplomat (1563–1626)

Robert Sidney KG
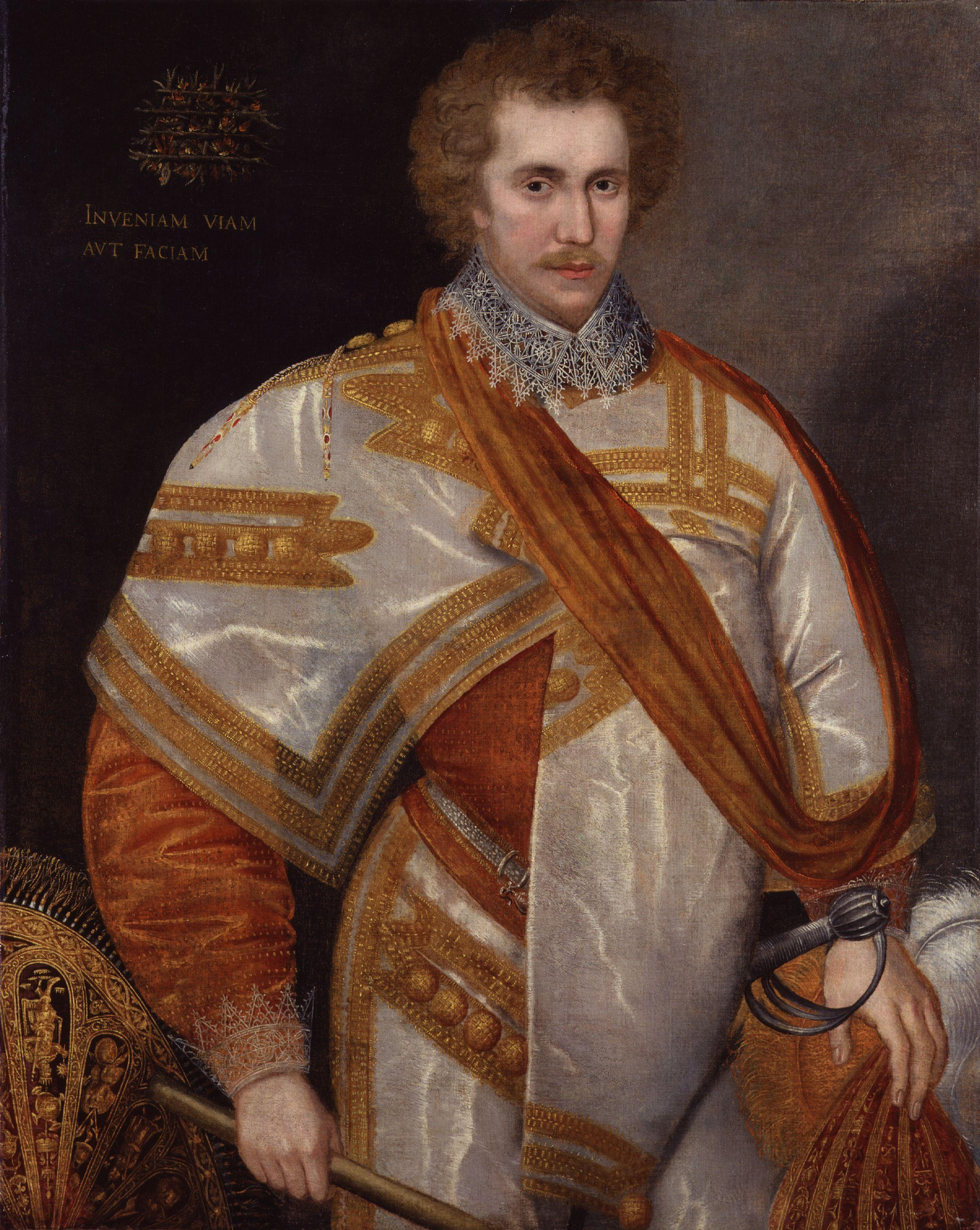
- Sidney c. 1588. At the top left is inscribed his Latin motto: Inveniam Viam Aut Faciam ("I shall find the way or make it")

1st Earl of Leicester
- Reign: July 1618 - 13 July 1626
- Successor: Robert Sidney
- Born: 19 November 1563
- Died: 13 July 1626 (aged 62)
- Noble family: Sidney
- Spouses: Barbara Gamage; Sarah Blount
- Issue: Sir William Sidney; Robert Sidney, 2nd Earl of Leicester; Henry Sidney; Philip Sidney; Lady Mary Wroth; Catherine Sidney; Philippa Sidney; Barbara Sidney; Dorothy Sidney; Elizabeth Sidney; Bridget Sidney
- Father: Henry Sidney
- Mother: Mary Dudley

Arms of Sidney: Or, a pheon azure

Robert Sidney, 1st Earl of Leicester KG (19 November 1563 – 13 July 1626), was an English courtier, soldier, and landowner. He was chamberlain to Anne of Denmark.

== Family background ==
Robert Sidney was the second son of Sir Henry Sidney, was a statesman of Elizabethan and Jacobean England. He was also a patron of the arts and a poet. His mother, Mary Sidney née Dudley, was a lady-in-waiting to Queen Elizabeth I and a sister of Robert Dudley, 1st Earl of Leicester, an advisor and favourite of the Queen.

== Career ==
Sidney was educated at Shrewsbury and Christ Church, Oxford, afterwards travelling on the Continent for some years between 1578 and 1583. In 1585 he was elected member of parliament for Glamorganshire; and in the same year he went with his elder brother, Sir Philip Sidney to the Netherlands, where he served in the war against Spain under Robert Dudley. He was present at the Battle of Zutphen in September 1586, where Sir Philip Sidney was mortally wounded, and remained with his brother.

Elizabeth sent Sidney, a "rare young man", on a diplomatic mission to Scotland in August 1588, and to France on a similar errand in 1593. In 1588 he was appointed governor of the cautionary town of Flushing, Netherlands, and he spent much time there. In 1595 he sent his business manager Rowland Whyte to court to lobby for resources for Flushing, and to send him information about events at court including the latest political gossip. Whyte's letters provide a major resource for historians of the period. Whyte himself regularly complains about the indecipherable handwriting of his employer's replies.

In 1603, on the accession of James I, he returned to England. Sidney bought new clothes to meet the king at Lord Harington's house at Burley. James raised him at once to the peerage as Baron Sidney of Penshurst, and he was appointed chamberlain and surveyor to the queen consort, Anne of Denmark. Sidney was involved in the English administration of her jointure lands and her revenues. He dealt with correspondence from county agents, like Thomas Coningsby, and worked on a plan to enlarge the park of Nonsuch Palace to make it a better residence for the queen.

Identified as an influential courtier, the French ambassador the Marquis de Rosny gave him a chain of perfumed gold beads and diamonds with a miniature of Henry IV of France. In January 1605, Sidney was involved the production of The Masque of Blackness. Jewels used in the costumes valued at £10,000 were borrowed from goldsmiths including John Spilman, and Sidney became liable for £40 for two lost diamonds. He was created Viscount Lisle. In August 1605 he decided to visit Vlissingen, but a storm forced his ship to land in Spanish territory at Gravelines. A suspicion arose at the English court that he had intended to go there, perhaps to betray the English-held fortress. Sidney managed to clear himself.

In 1606 he returned to the Netherlands where he rendered distinguished service in the war for the next two years. He wrote to William Trumbull in September 1614 with news of the queen's illness, she was "much troubled with paines in her legs and feet". In August 1615 he went with Anne of Denmark to Bath, and was joined by his daughter Catherine and her husband Lewis Mansel who travelled from Margam. Catherine came for medical advice in Bath.

In May 1618 he wrote to Sir Thomas Lake, the king's secretary with news of the queen declaration about efforts to reduce household expenses. She had told him that "while she lives she will obey the king in all things ... She therefore desires his majesty to take what order it shall please him, which shall please her also, for being wholly ignorant in household business, she will not any meddle with them".

In July 1618 he became Earl of Leicester. The title had become extinct in 1588 on the death of his uncle Robert Dudley, part of whose property he had inherited. Sidney wrote to his wife that their promotion was due to Anne of Denmark.

He was ill in September 1618 and was attended at Hampton Court by Henry Atkins and Théodore de Mayerne at the request of Anne of Denmark.

== Marriage and progeny ==
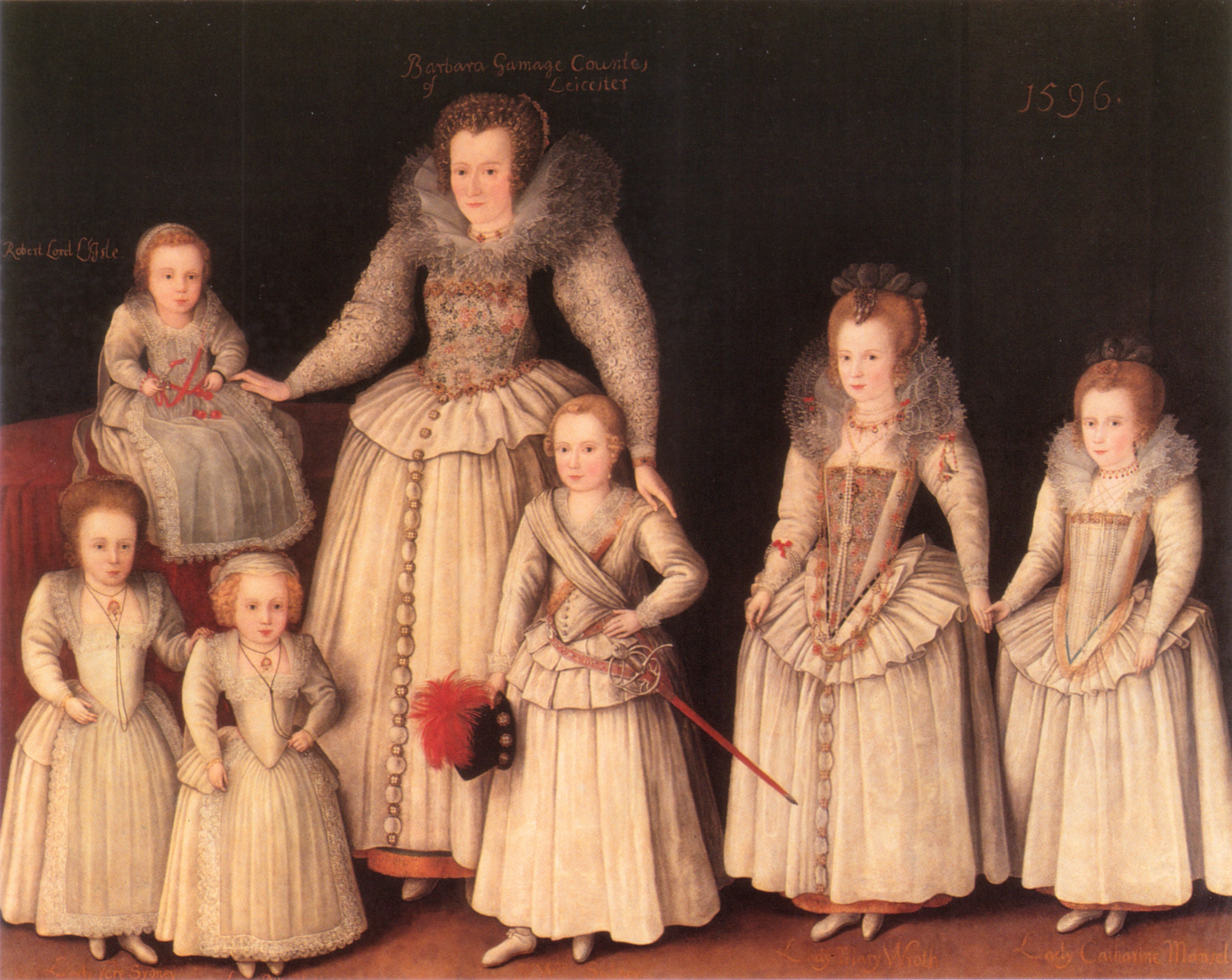
Barbara Sidney with six of her children, painted c. 1596 by Marcus Gheeraerts the Younger (1561–1636), collection of Viscount de Lisle, Penshurst Place

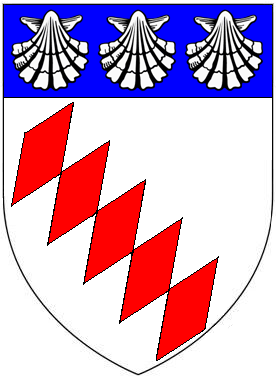
Arms of Gammage of Coity Castle, Glamorgan: Argent, five fusils in bend gules on a chief azure three escallops of the first

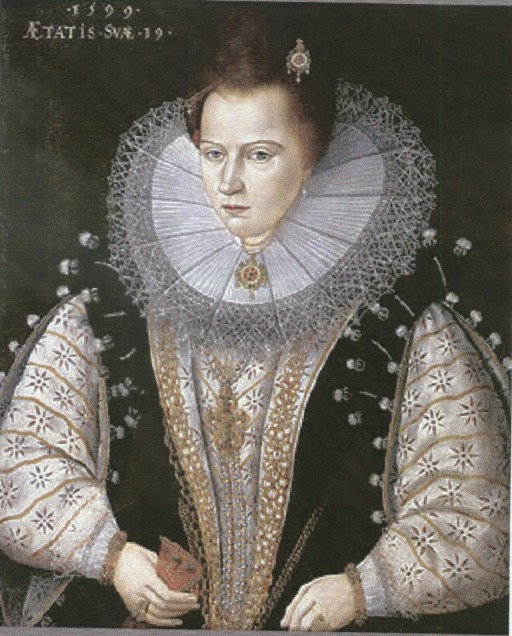
Sidney's second wife, Sarah Blount, inscribed: 1599 Aetatis Suae 19 ("1599: in the 19th year of her age")

Sidney married twice:

Firstly to Barbara Gamage, a noted heiress and beauty, the daughter of John Gamage, of Coity Castle, a Glamorgan gentleman. By his first wife, he had eleven children.

- Mary Sidney (c. 1587 – c. 1653) (Lady Mary Wroth), who married Sir Robert Wroth of Loughton Hall, was like her father a poet; Ben Jonson dedicated The Alchemist to her in 1612.
- Catherine Sidney (c. 1589 – 1616), who married Sir Lewis Mansel.
- Sir William Sidney (1590–1612), his eldest son who predeceased his father and died unmarried.
- Henry Sidney (1591)
- Elizabeth Sidney (1592–1605)
- Philippa Sidney (1594–1620), who performed in masques at Whitehall Palace, married Sir John Hobart, 2nd Baronet, third son of Sir Henry Hobart, 1st Baronet, Lord Chief Justice of the Common Pleas and ancestor of the Earls of Buckinghamshire.
- Robert Sidney, 2nd Earl of Leicester (1595–1677), second son and heir.
- Bridget Sidney (1597–1599)
- Alice Sidney (1598–1599)
- Barbara Sidney (1599–1643), who married first Thomas Smythe, bore Philip Smythe, 2nd Viscount Strangford, and married secondly to Thomas Culpeper.
- Vere Sidney (1602–1606)

Secondly to Sarah Blount, daughter of William Blount and widow of Sir Thomas Smythe, by whom he had no children.

== Music and poetry ==
Leicester was a man of taste and a patron of literature, whose cultured mode of life at his country seat, Penshurst Place, was celebrated in verse by Ben Jonson. Robert Sidney was a patron of musicians, as is proved by his being the dedicatee of Robert Jones's First Booke of Songes and Ayres (1600) and A Musicall Banquet (1610) compiled by Robert Dowland, son of the composer John Dowland. Sidney had agreed to be godfather to John Dowland's son, and A Musicall Banquet opens with a Galliard by John Dowland entitled Syr Robert Sidney his Galliard.

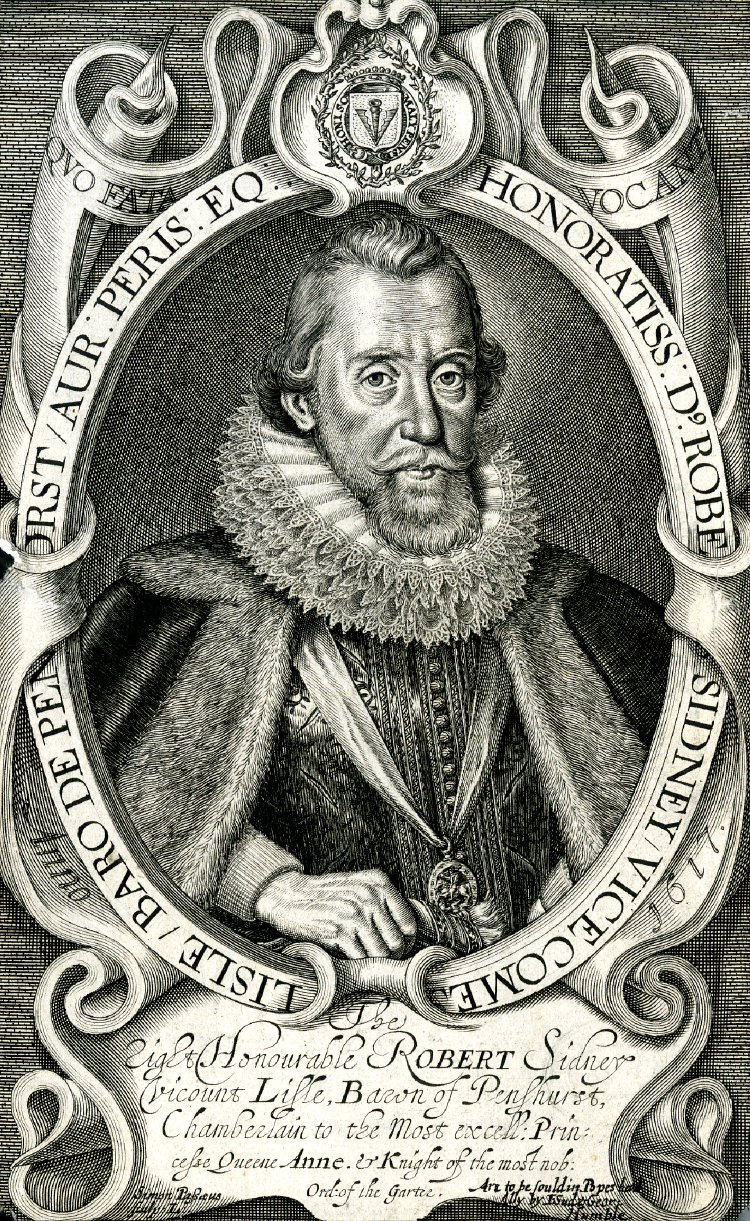
Engraved portrait of Sidney by Simon de Passe, 1617

Though the brother of one of the most famous poets in the English language, it was not suspected that Robert Sidney had himself been a poet until the 1960s, when his working notebook emerged (in a 19th-century binding) through the dispersal of the Library of Warwick Castle. Subsequent research showed it had been acquired in 1848 after passing through a number of sales beginning with the dispersal of the library at Penshurst in the early 19th century. Sold again at Sotheby's and acquired by the British Library in 1975 (catalogued as Add MS 58435), the autograph is, as its first editor P. J. Croft pointed out, "the largest body of verse to have survived from the Elizabethan period in a text entirely set down by the poet himself".

== Armorials ==
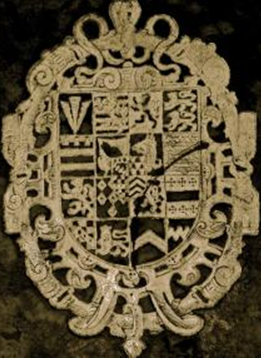
Heraldic impression of arms of Robert Sidney in one of 55 books purchased by the Bodleian Library with his donation in 1600 of £100

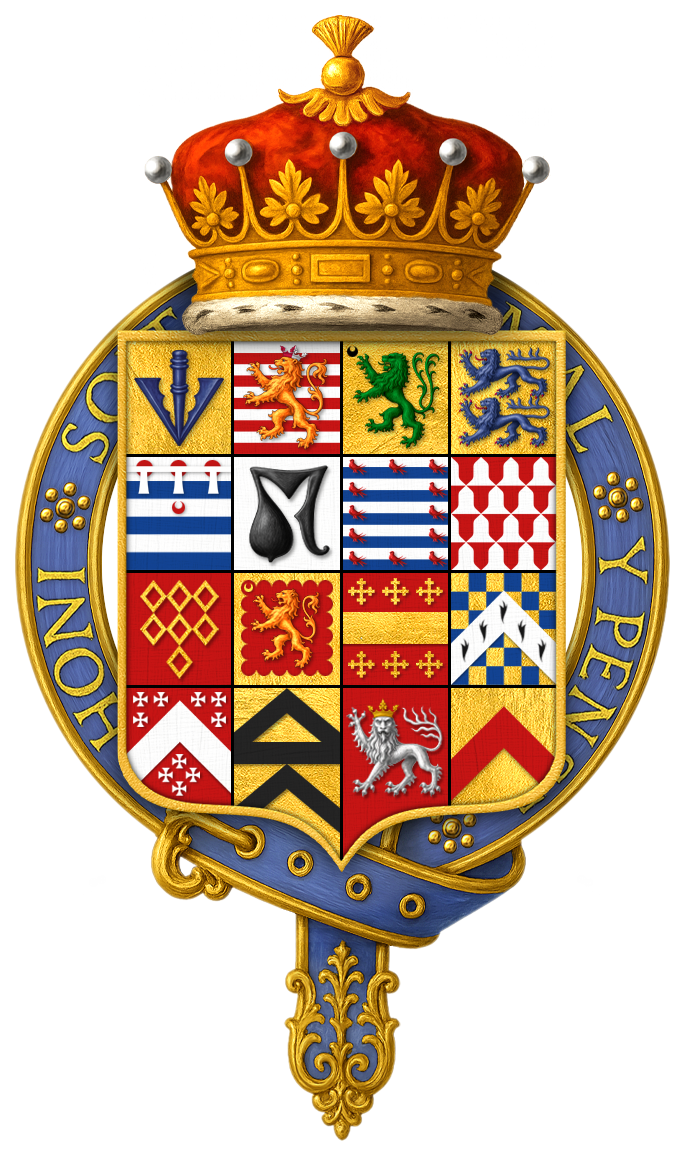
Quartered arms Sir Robert Sidney, 1st Earl of Leicester, KG

The arms of Robert Sidney, 1st Earl of Leicester showed sixteen quarters as follows:
1. A pheon (Sydney) 2. Barry of ten a lion rampant crowned (Brandon) 3. A lion rampant double queued (Dudley) 4. Two lions passant (Somerie) 5. Barry of six in chief three torteaux a label of three points for difference (Grey, Viscount Lisle) 6. A maunch (Hastings) 7. A wolf's head erased (Lupus, Earl of Chester) 8. Barry of ten as many martlets in orle (de Valence, Earl of Pembroke) 9. A lion rampant (Marshall, Earl of Pembroke) 10. Seven mascles conjoined three and one (Ferrers of Groby) 11. A lion rampant within a bordure engrailed (Talbot) 12. A fess between six crosses crosslet (Beauchamp) 13. Checky, a chevron ermine (Newburgh, Earl of Warwick) 14. A lion statant gardant crowned (Baron de Lisle) 15. A chevron (Tyes) 16. A fess dancetty (West); over-all an inescutcheon of pretence of his wife's paternal arms: quarterly: 1. Five fusils in bend on a chief three escallops (Gamage) 2. Vair (Martel?) 3. Checky, a fess ermine (Turberville of Coity Castle) 4. Three chevrons (Llewellyn)

Peerage of England
New creation	Earl of Leicester; 1618–1626	Succeeded by Robert Sidney
New creation	Viscount Lisle; 1605–1626	Succeeded by Robert Sidney
