= Patricia Akhimie =

Professor of English

Academic background
- Education: Columbia University
- Thesis: Cultivating Difference in Early Modern Drama and the Literature of Travel (2011)

Patricia Akhimie is an associate professor Rutgers University who is known for her work on early modern women's travel writing and Shakespearean writing.

== Education and career ==
Akhimie has a B.A. from Princeton University (2000), an M.F.A. from the University of Michigan (2002), an M.A. (2003) and a Ph.D. (2011) from Columbia University. Akhimie has served as the scholar-in-residence for the St. Louis Shakespeare Festival. As of 2022, she is an associate professor at Rutgers University in the departments of English, women's and gender studies, and she was named director of the Folger Institute in November 2022.

== Selected publications ==
Her first book, Shakespeare and the Cultivation of Difference: Race, Conduct, and the Early Modern World was published by Routledge in 2018. Her co-edited collection (with Bernadette Andrea), Travel and Travail: Early Modern Women, English Drama, and the Wider World, was published by the University of Nebraska Press in 2019.

- Akhimie, Patricia (June 1, 2009). "Travel, drama, and domesticity: colonial huswifery in John Fletcher and Philip Massinger's The Sea Voyage". Studies in Travel Writing. 13 (2): 153–166. doi:10.1080/13645140902866993. ISSN 1364-5145. S2CID 162099715.
- Akhimie, Patricia (2018). Shakespeare and the Cultivation of Difference. Routledge. doi:10.4324/9781351125048. ISBN 978-1-351-12504-8.
- Akhimie, Patricia; Andrea, Bernadette (2019). Travel and travail : early modern women, English drama, and the wider world. ISBN 978-1-4962-0226-0. OCLC 1086273325.
