= Saheli Rochana Gamage =

Sri Lankan singer and a doctor (born 1988)

Saheli Rochana Gamage (born 8 March 1988) is a Sri Lankan singer, political eulogist and a doctor. She holds the title "Visharada". She is noted for her popular political song titled 'Ayubowewa, Maharajanani' (Great King long life to you) which is devoted to a then Sri Lankan President, Mahinda Rajapaksa and the three Armed Forces and police who fought in the Sri Lankan Civil War.
