= Bassetts Manor =

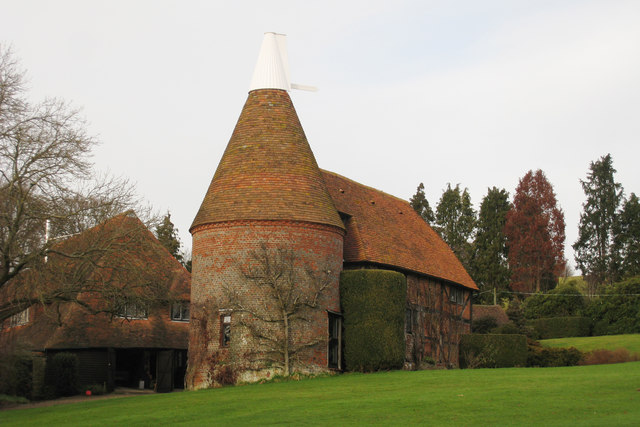
- The Oast, Bassetts Manor

- Location within East Sussex
- 51°07′13″N 0°05′41″E
- Location: Hartfield
- OS grid reference: TQ 46705 37751

History
- Built: 16th century

Site notes
- Area: East Sussex

Listed Building – Grade II
- Official name: Bassetts Manor
- Designated: 26 November 1953
- Reference no.: 1028291

Bassetts Manor is a Grade II-listed building in Hartfield, East Sussex, England.

== Location ==
The manor is located North of the village of Hartfield, in Withyham, East Sussex.

== History ==
The two-storey manor was built in the 16th century. The front door dates back to the early 17th century. The property includes eighteen workshops, three cottages, and three stables.

In 1969, the manor was purchased by the Whetstone family. In 1986, it was used as a beef-raising farm.

== Heritage significance ==
It has been listed as a Grade II building by English Heritage since 26 November 1953.
