= Wroth baronets =

Extinct baronetcy in the Baronetage of England

The Wroth Baronetcy, of Blenden Hall in the County of Kent, was a title in the Baronetage of England. It was created on 29 November 1660 for John Wroth. The baronetcy became extinct upon the death of the third Baronet in 1721. The third Baronet, whose seat was Petherton Park in Somerset, was member of parliament for Bridgwater, for Somerset and for Wells. The title became extinct on his death in 1721.

== Wroth baronets, of Blenden Hall (1660) ==
Escutcheon of the Wroth baronets of Blenden Hall

- Sir John Wroth, 1st Baronet (1627–1664)
- Sir John Wroth, 2nd Baronet (1653–1677)
- Sir Thomas Wroth, 3rd Baronet (1674–1721)
