= Robert Wroth (Middlesex MP) =

English politician (d. 1606)

Sir Robert Wroth (c. 1540 – 27 January 1607) was an English politician.

== Life ==
Robert, born in Middlesex about 1540, was eldest son of Sir Thomas Wroth (died 1573) by his wife Mary, daughter of Richard, Lord Rich. He was admitted a pensioner of St John's College, Cambridge, on 21 April 1553, but, owing to the religious changes consequent on the accession of Mary I, he left the university without a degree soon after his admission. Accompanying his father in his exile, he returned to England soon after the accession of Elizabeth I. He afterwards entered public life, and the rest of his career was devoted to politics and the administration of a large estate.

He was elected for the first time to parliament for St Albans on 11 January 1563; he was returned for Bossiney on 2 April 1571; he took his seat as member for the important constituency of Middlesex on 8 May 1572, and was re-elected to seven later parliaments (1584, 1586, 1589, 1593, 1597, 1601, and 1604).

Meanwhile, his father's death on 9 October 1573 had placed him in possession of large estates in Middlesex, Hertfordshire, Essex, and Somerset; but he lived chiefly at Loughton Hall, Essex, which he acquired through his wife, and devoted much time to the affairs of the county of Essex. He was High Sheriff of Essex in 1587. He was appointed to the command of two hundred untrained men, forty harquebusiers, and forty musketeers of Essex in the army which was raised in 1588 to resist the Spanish Armada. He was knighted in 1597. During the closing years of Queen Elizabeth's reign he, as a staunch protestant and loyal supporter of the queen's government, was nominated to serve on many special commissions for the trial of persons charged with high treason, including Dr. William Parry (20 February 1584–5), Anthony Babington (5 September 1586), Patrick O'Cullen (21 February 1593), many Jesuits and suspected coiners (26 March 1593), and Valentine Thomas (22 July 1598).

In 1599 he wrote to Michael Hicks of Ducketts in Tottenham about robbers or highwaymen who gathered in the evening at Snaresbrook, Leyton Heath, and Temple Mill. He hoped Colstone, Hicks's brother-in-law who lived nearby at Forest House, could catch them.

Wroth retained the favour of the government under James I. On 22 May 1603 the new king granted him a walkership in Waltham Forest for life, and on 19 February next year he and others were directed to see to the erection of bridges across the river Lea between Hackney and Hoddesdon for the king's convenience when hawking. On 18 and 19 July 1605 he entertained James I at his residence at Loughton in Essex for two days. His estates in Essex were increased by the death of Francis Stonard, his father-in-law, on 13 September 1604. He was a juryman at the trial of Sir Walter Ralegh on 15 September 1603, when through some misunderstanding he incurred the displeasure of the attorney-general. He was in the special commission of oyer and terminer for Middlesex issued 16 January 1606 for the trial of Guy Fawkes and the Gunpowder Plot conspirators.

Wroth died on 27 January 1607, and was buried on the following day at Enfield. His obsequies were formally celebrated on 3 March.

== Family ==
Sir Robert married Susan, daughter and heiress of John Stonard of Loughton, through whom he acquired the estate of Loughton. He seems to have had at least four surviving sons:

- Sir Robert (1576?–1614) who married Lady Mary Wroth.
- John, who was admitted a student of the Inner Temple, 1596, was afterwards described as a captain, and succeeded to Durrants (also spelt Durants), the family's estate at Enfield in Middlesex,
- Thomas.
- Henry, who is styled "of Woodbury in Herefordshire".

Sir Henry Wroth (died 1671), second son of Henry, Sir Robert's youngest son, acquired some fame as a royalist during the civil wars.
