= Robert Dowland =

English lutenist and composer (c. 1591–1641)

Robert Dowland (c. 1591 – 28 November 1641) was an English anthologist, composer, lutenist of Renaissance and early Baroque music. The son of composer and lutenist John Dowland, Robert is primarily known for his compilation of two major lute anthologies, A Musicall Banquet and A Varietie of Lute Lessons, both published in 1610.

== Life and career ==
Robert Dowland was born around 1591, probably in London. He was the son of the lutenist and composer John Dowland, and named for his father's patron Robert Sidney, 1st Earl of Leicester, who was also the younger Dowland's godfather.

In 1610 he published two collections of music, A Varietie of Lute Lessons and A Musical Banquet (an anthology of work by other composers including his father). On either 20 or 21 January 1626 his father died and Robert succeeded him as royal lutenist.

Robert Dowland wrote only three known compositions, including two in Varietie of Lute Lessons: Sir Thomas Monson his Pavin and The Honorable the Lady Cliftons Spirit. His other work was Almande Ro: Dowlande from the Margaret Board Lutebook. Another, The King of Denmark's Galliard was erroneously ascribed to him by the lutenist Georg Leopold Fuhrmann and was actually authored by his father.
