= Bernadette Andrea =

English professor

Academic background
- Education: University of Calgary
- Thesis: A heretic in the truth : Milton's construction of the mediated woman (1990)

Bernadette Andrea is a professor in the Department of English at the University of California, Santa Barbara. She is also a core faculty in the Center for Middle East Studies, an affiliate faculty in the Comparative Literature Program, and an affiliate faculty in the Department of Feminist Studies. She previously taught at the University of Texas, San Antonio, where she was the Celia Jacobs Endowed Professor in British Literature. She received her PhD from Cornell University. Her book on Women and Islam in Early Modern English Literature was published by Cambridge University Press in 2007 (paperback reprint 2009). Other books include Travel and Travail: Early Modern Women, English Drama, and the Wider World, with Patricia Akhimie (University of Nebraska Press, 2019), The Lives of Girls and Women from the Islamic World in Early Modern British Literature and Culture (University of Toronto Press, 2017), English Women Staging Islam, 1696–1707 (University of Toronto, Centre for Reformation and Renaissance Studies, 2012), and Early Modern England and Islamic Worlds, with Linda McJannet (Palgrave Macmillan, 2011).

== Selected publications ==
- Andrea, Bernadette (2008). Women and Islam in Early Modern English Literature. Cambridge: Cambridge University Press. ISBN 978-0-521-86764-1.
- Manley, Mary DeLaRivière; Pix, Mary; Andrea, Bernadette Diane; Victoria University, eds. (2012). English women staging Islam, 1696–1707. The other voice in early modern Europe series The Toronto series. Toronto: Iter Inc. ISBN 978-0-7727-2120-4.
- Akhimie, Patricia; Andrea, Bernadette (2019). Travel and travail : early modern women, English drama, and the wider world. U of Nebraska Press. ISBN 978-1-4962-0226-0. OCLC 1086273325.
