= Robert Wroth (died 1614) =

English courtier and Member of Parliament

Robert Wroth (died 1614) was an English courtier and Member of Parliament for Newtown.

== Career ==
He was a son of Robert Wroth (d. 1606) and Susan Stonard, daughter of John Stonard of Loughton in Essex. He was knighted by King James at Syon House in May 1603.

On 27 September 1604 at Penshurst he married the poet Mary Sidney, a daughter of Robert Sidney, 1st Earl of Leicester and Barbara Gamage.

Prince Henry visited his father Robert Wroth from Nonsuch Palace and stayed for three days in May 1605. King James visited Loughton in July 1605. Prince Henry returned in July 1606.

Wroth bought a manor in Essex in March 1608 from William Cornwallis, whose brother Charles Cornwallis was angered by the sale of his family's lands. He was the King's tenant at the manor of Loughton, and claimed in 1608 that the buildings were old and low, the rooms small, and the building unfit to receive the King if he wanted to hunt in Waltham Forest. He wanted to acquire the house and rebuild it. Mary Wroth wrote to Anne of Denmark asking her to intercede with the king for the same project, arguing that Loughton manor was "old and in decay and like every day to fall down" and the new house could accommodate both King and Queen, and her husband took pains to preserve the deer for the King's sports.

The house was described as rebuilt in June 1612. Wroth may have incurred his large debts, which have sometimes been attributed to his wife's extravagance, by buying and refurbishing the house at Loughton. Wroth was a commissioner to the royal works to extend Theobalds and improve the park.

His friend Ben Jonson described Loughton and Robert Wroth's virtues as a host in a poem in the collection, The Forest. Although William Drummond of Hawthornden recorded that Jonson said Mary Wroth was, "unworthily married on a jealous husband", Jonson's poem To Sir Robert Wroth, which dwells on his unmartial character, is not necessarily satirical in intent. William Gamage wrote a couplet praising Robert Wroth's housekeeping at his other property, Durants in Enfield.

Robert Wroth died of gangrene in 1614.

His young son and heir died in July 1616 and his inheritance passed to his uncle, John Wroth.
