= Lady Mary Wroth =

English noblewoman and poet

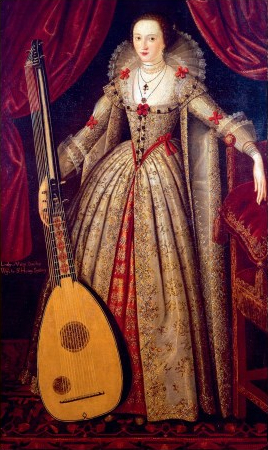
- Born: Mary Sidney; 18 October 1587
- Died: 1651 or 1653 (aged 63–66)
- Occupation: Poet
- Spouse: Robert Wroth (m. 1604; died 1614)
- Children: 3
- Father: Robert Sidney
- Relatives: Mary Sidney (aunt); Philip Sidney (uncle)

Lady Mary Wroth (née Sidney; 18 October 1587 – 1651/3) was an English noblewoman and a poet of the English Renaissance. A member of a distinguished literary family, Lady Wroth was among the first female English writers to have achieved an enduring reputation. Mary Wroth was niece to Mary Herbert, née Sidney (Countess of Pembroke and one of the most distinguished women writers and patrons of the 16th century), and to Sir Philip Sidney, a famous Elizabethan poet-courtier.

== Biography ==
Because her father, Robert Sidney, was governor of Flushing, Wroth spent much of her childhood at the home of Mary Sidney, Baynard's Castle in London, and at Penshurst Place. Penshurst Place was one of the great country houses in the Elizabethan and Jacobean period. It was a centre of literary and cultural activity and its gracious hospitality is praised in Ben Jonson's famous poem To Penshurst. During a time when most women were illiterate, Wroth had the privilege of a formal education, which was obtained from household tutors under the guidance of her mother. With her family connections, a career at court was all but inevitable. Wroth danced before Queen Elizabeth on a visit to Penshurst and again in court in 1602. At this time a likeness of her as a girl in a group portrait of Lady Sidney and her children was painted by Marcus Gheeraerts the Younger in 1596, and is now on display at Penshurst. As a young woman, Lady Mary belonged to Queen Anne’s intimate circle of friends and actively participated in masques and entertainments.

On 27 September 1604, King James I married Mary to Sir Robert Wroth of Loughton Hall. The marriage was not happy; there were issues between the two beginning with difficulties over her father’s payment of her dowry. In a letter written to his wife, Sir Robert Sidney described different meetings with Robert Wroth, who was often distressed by the behaviour of Mary shortly after their marriage. Robert Wroth appeared to have been a gambler, philanderer and a drunkard. More evidence of the unhappy union comes from poet and friend Ben Jonson, who noted that ‘my Lady Wroth is unworthily married on a Jealous husband’. Various letters from Lady Mary to Queen Anne also refer to the financial losses her husband had sustained during their time together.

During her marriage, Mary became known for her literary endeavours and also for her performances in several masques. In 1605 she danced at the Whitehall Banqueting House in The Masque of Blackness, which was designed by Ben Jonson and Inigo Jones. Mary Wroth joined the Queen and her friends in the production; all of whom painted their skin black to portray Ethiopian nymphs who called themselves the 'twelve daughters of Niger'. The masque was very successful and was the first in a long series of similar court entertainments. The ‘twelve daughters of Niger’ also appeared in The Masque of Beauty in 1608, also designed by Jonson and Jones. However, despite the success there were some less than favourable reviews, some referring to the women's portrayal of the daughters of Niger as ugly and unconvincing.

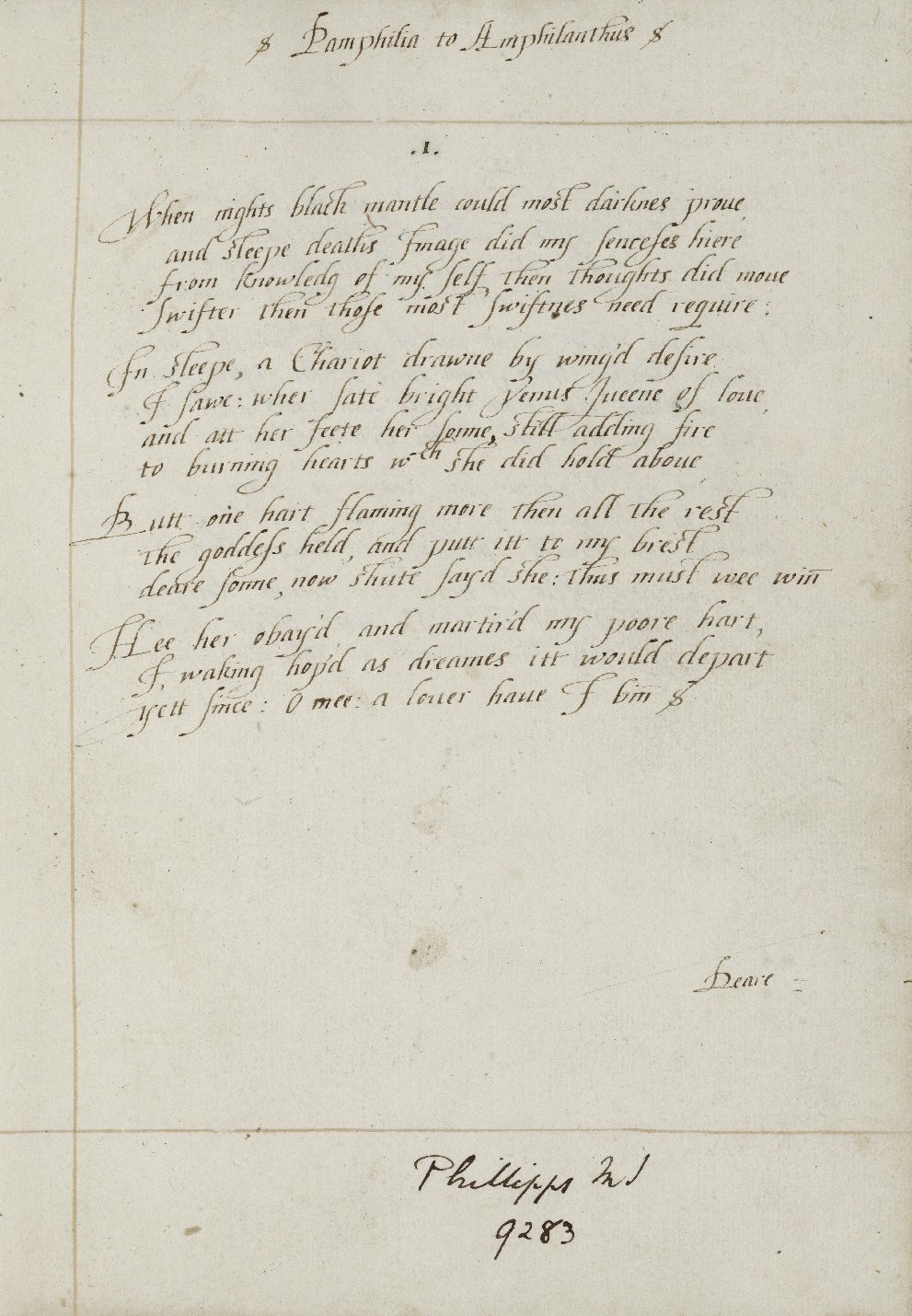
The first sonnet of Wroth's manuscript of Pamphilia to Amphilanthus, c. 1620

In February 1614 Mary gave birth to a son James: a month after this her husband Robert Wroth died of gangrene leaving Mary deeply in debt. Two years later Wroth's son died causing Mary to lose the Wroth estate to John Wroth, the next male heir to the entail. There is no evidence to suggest that Wroth was unfaithful to her husband, but after his death she entered a relationship with her cousin William Herbert, 3rd Earl of Pembroke. Mary and William shared interests in arts and literature and had been childhood friends. They had at least two illegitimate children, a daughter Catherine and son William. In "Herbertorum Prosapia", a seventeenth-century manuscript compilation of the history of the Herbert family (held at the Cardiff Library), Sir Thomas Herbert – a cousin of the Earl of Pembroke – recorded William Herbert's paternity of Wroth's two children.

Mary Wroth's alleged relationship with William Herbert and her children born from that union are referenced in her work, The Countess of Montgomery’s Urania. It is also claimed that William Herbert was a favourite of Queen Anne and that she is the reason he gained the position of the King's Lord Chamberlain in 1615. In Urania, Wroth repeatedly returns to references to a powerful and jealous Queen who exiles her weaker rival from the court in order to obtain her lover, causing many critics to believe this referenced tension between Queen Anne and Wroth over the love of Herbert.

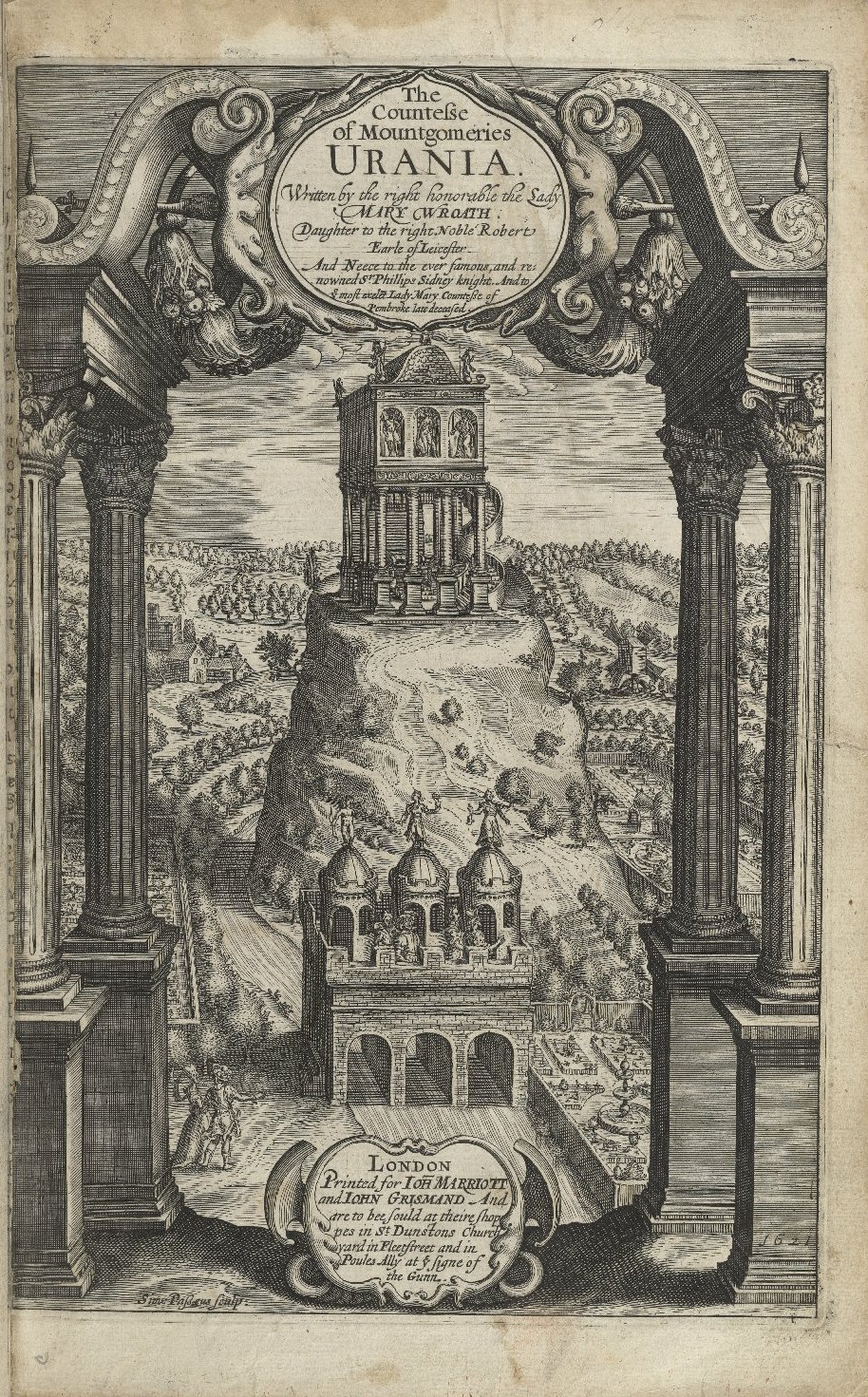
The title page of Urania's first edition, printed in 1621

The publication of the book in 1621 was a succès de scandale, as it was widely (and with some justification) viewed as a roman à clef. The diffuse plot is organized around relations between Pamphilia and her wandering lover, Amphilanthus, and most critics consider it to contain significant autobiographical elements. Although Wroth claimed that she never had any intention of publishing the book, she was heavily criticized by powerful noblemen for depicting their private lives under the guise of fiction. However, her period of notoriety was brief after the scandal aroused by these allusions in her romance; Urania was withdrawn from sale by December 1621. Two of the few authors to acknowledge this work were Ben Jonson and Edward Denny. Jonson, a friend and colleague of Mary Wroth praised both Wroth and her works in "Sonnet to the noble Lady, the Lady Mary Wroth." Jonson claims that copying Wroth's works he not only became a better poet, but a better lover. Denny on the other hand provides a very negative critique of Wroth's work; he accused her of slander in a satiric poem, calling her a "hermaphrodite" and a "monster". While Wroth returned fire in a poem of her own, the notoriety of the episode may have contributed to her low profile in the last decades of her life. There was also a second half of Urania, which was published for the first time in 1999, the original manuscript of which now resides in the Newberry Library in Chicago. According to Shelia T. Cavanaugh, the second portion of the work was never prepared by Wroth for actual publication and the narrative contains many inconsistencies and is somewhat difficult to read.

After the publication issues surrounding Urania, Wroth left King James' court and was later abandoned by William Herbert. There is little known about Wroth's later years but it is known that she continued to face major financial difficulties for the remainder of her life. Wroth died in either 1651 or 1653. Mary is commemorated in Loughton by the naming of a footpath adjacent to Loughton Hall as Lady Mary's Path and by Wroths Path in Little Cornwall.

== In popular culture ==
In 2019, Harvard literary historian Vanessa Braganza identified a copy of Xenophon's Cyropaedia which she found at a rare book fair as Wroth's based on a cryptic monogram cipher on its cover. The letters of the cipher spell the names "Pamphilia" and "Amphilanthus," autobiographical personae for Wroth and Herbert themselves. To date, the Cyropaedia is the only surviving book from Wroth's library except for manuscripts of her own works. The discovery sparked public interest in Wroth's use of ciphers and her previously little-known status as the first female English novelist.

== Works ==
- Love's Victory (c.1620) – pastoral closet drama.
- The Countess of Montgomery's Urania (1621) – The first extant prose romance by an English woman.
- Pamphilia to Amphilanthus (1621) – early sonnet sequence by an English woman.

== Secondary sources ==
- Andrea, Bernadette, "Pamphilia's Cabinet: Gender Authorship and Empire in Lady Mary Wroth's Urania." English Literary History 68.2, 2001.
- Bates, Catherine. "Astrophil and the Manic Wit of the Abject Male." SEL: Studies in English Literature 1500–1900. Houston: William Marsh Rice University, Vol. 41, Num. 1, Winter 2001, pp. 1–24. .
- Braganza, V.M., "“Many Ciphers, Although But One for Meaning”: Lady Mary Wroth's Many-Sided Monogram." English Literary Renaissance 52.1 (2022): pp. 124-152.
- Butler, John & Jokinen, Anniina. The Life of Lady Mary Wroth. 2006. . 28 October 2008.
- Cañadas, Ivan. "Questioning Men's Love in Sir Philip Sidney’s Astrophil and Stella and Lady Mary Wroth's Pamphilia to Amphilanthus". Medieval and Early Modern English Studies [MEMESAK journal]. Vol 13, Num. 1, 2005. pp. 99–121.
- Cavanaugh, Shelia T. Cherished Torment: The Emotional Geography of Lady Mary Wroth's Urania. Pittsburgh: Duquesne University Press, 2001.
- Grosart, Alexander, The Complete Poems of Sir Philip Sidney. Oregon: University of Oregon, December 1995. .
- Hagerman, Anita. "'But Worth pretends': Discovering Jonsonian Masque in Lady Mary Wroth's Pamphilia to Amphilanthus." Early Modern Literary Studies 6.3 (January 2001): 4.1–17 .
- Lamb, Mary Ellen, 'Wroth, Lady Mary (1587-1651/1653)', Oxford Dictionary of National Biography, Oxford University Press, Sept 2004; online edn, Jan 2008. .
- Lamb, Mary Ellen. Gender and Authorship in the Sidney Circle. Madison: University of Wisconsin Press, 1990.
- Miller, Naomi, J. Changing the Subject. Mary Wroth and Figurations of Gender in Early Modern England. Lexington: The University Press of Kentucky, 1960.
- Miller, Naomi. "'Not much to be marked': Narrative of the Woman's Part in Lady Mary Wroth' Urania." .
- Mullaney, Steven. "Strange Things, Gross Terms, Curious Customs: The Rehearsal of Cultures in the Late Renaissance," in Representing the English Renaissance, ed. Stephen Greenblatt (Berkeley: Univ. of California Press, 1988).
- Mullaney, Steven. The Place of Stage: License, Play and Power in Renaissance England. Chicago: University of Chicago Press, 1988.
- Nandini Das, Lady Mary Wroth-Biography. 2005. English.cam.ac/uk/wroth/biography. 30 October 2008.
- Roberts, Josephine A. The Poems of Lady Mary Wroth. Baton Rouge: Louisiana State University Press, 1983.
- Salzman, Paul. "Contemporary References in Wroth’s Urania" The Review of English Studies, New Series, Vol. 29, No. 114 (May 1978), pp. 178–18. .
- Taylor, Sue "Lady Mary Wroth" Loughton, LDHS. 2005 ISBN 0-9542314-8-1
- Verzella, Massimo "Hid as worthless rite". Scrittura femminile nell’Inghilterra di re Giacomo: Elizabeth Cary e Mary Wroth, Roma, Aracne, 2007.
- Verzella, Massimo, "The Renaissance Englishwoman’s Entry into Print: Authorizing Strategies", The Atlantic Critical Review, III, 3 (July–September 2004), pp. 1–19;
- Waller, Gary. The Sidney Family Romance: Mary Wroth, William Herbert, and the early modern construction of gender. Detroit: Wayne State University Press, 1993.
- Wilson, Mona, Sir Philip Sidney. London: Duckworth, 1931.
