= Robert Metcalfe (Hebraist) =

English priest and professor of Hebrew

Robert Metcalfe (1579–1652) was an English priest and Regius Professor of Hebrew at the University of Cambridge.

== Life ==
Son of Alexander Metcalfe of Beverley, Yorkshire, he was educated at Beverley Grammar School and St John's College, Cambridge, where he graduated M.A. in 1606. On 10 April 1606 he was admitted a fellow of St. John's College, Cambridge, and in 1616 he was elected a preacher there. He was vicar of Burwell, Cambridgeshire, in 1618 and was made Doctor of Divinity in 1630. Some time prior to 1645 he succeeded Andrew Byng of St. John's College as Regius Professor of Hebrew, but at what date is not known. In 1648 he vacated the chair, and was succeeded by Ralph Cudworth; his retirement was connected with his election to a fellowship at Trinity College in the same year, where he was also appointed catechiser and vice-master of the society in October. On 14 August 1646 he was appointed lecturer in Hebrew.

By the contemporary report of James Duport he was a scholarly recluse. Nicholas Hookes composed elegies to his memory, referring to his high status in Trinity and his generosity. He was a benefactor in particular of Beverley Grammar School.
