= Schweich Lectures on Biblical Archaeology =

Series of lectures delivered and published under the auspices of the British Academy

The Schweich Lectures on Biblical Archaeology are a series of lectures delivered and published under the auspices of the British Academy. The Leopold Schweich Trust Fund, set up in 1907, was a gift from Miss Constance Schweich in memory of her father. It provided for three public lectures to be delivered annually (now triennially) on subjects related to ‘the archaeology, art, history, languages and literature of Ancient Civilization with reference to Biblical Study’. The three papers given by each lecturer are published together in book form, by Oxford University Press. There have been many reprintings.

== Catalogue of titles ==
Book details are preceded by the year of delivery of the lectures. The date of publication is usually a year or two later.

- 1908. Modern Research as illustrating the Bible, by S. R. Driver
- 1909. The Composition of the Book of Isaiah in the Light of History and Archaeology, by Robert H. Kennett
- 1910. The Early Poetry of Israel in its Physical and Social Origins, by George Adam Smith
- 1911. The Philistines: Their History and Civilization, by R. A. Stewart Macalister
- 1912. The Relations between the Laws of Babylonia and the Laws of the Hebrew Peoples, by C. H. W. Johns
- 1913. Jewish and Christian Apocalypses, by F. Crawford Burkitt
- 1914. Une Communauté Judéo-Araméenne à Éléphantine, en Égypte, aux VIe et Ve Siècles av. J.-C., by A. van Hoonacker
- 1915. The Text of the Old Testament, by Édouard Naville
- 1916. Legends of Babylon and Egypt in relation to Hebrew Tradition, by Leonard W. King
- 1917. Israel's Settlement in Canaan: The Biblical Tradition and its Historical Background, by C. F. Burney
- 1918. The Hittites, by A. E. Cowley
- 1919. Lectures on the Apocalypse, by R. H. Charles
- 1920. The Septuagint and Jewish Worship: A Study in Origins, by H. St John Thackeray
- 1921. The Relations between Arabs and Israelites prior to the Rise of Islam, by D. S. Margoliouth
- 1922. Campaigns in Palestine from Alexander the Great, by Israel Abrahams
- 1923. The Samaritans: Their History, Doctrines and Literature, by Moses Gaster
- 1924. Kings of the Hittites, by David George Hogarth
- 1925. The Religion of Ancient Palestine in the Light of Archaeology, by Stanley A. Cook
- 1926. Palestine in General History, by Theodore H. Robinson, J. W. Hunkin and F. C. Burkitt
- 1927. The Apocalypse in Art, by Montague Rhodes James
- 1928. The Old and New Testaments in Muslim Religious Art, by Thomas W. Arnold
- 1929. A Comparative Study of the Literatures of Egypt, Palestine, and Mesopotamia: Egypt's Contribution to the Literature of the Ancient World, by T. Eric Peet
- 1930. Ancient Synagogues in Palestine and Greece, by E. L. Sukenik
- 1931. Ancient Hebrew Social Life and Custom as Indicated in Law, Narrative and Metaphor, by R. H. Kennett
- 1932. Recent Developments in the Textual Criticism of the Greek Bible, by Frederic G. Kenyon
- 1933. Babylonian Menologies and the Semitic Calendars, by S. Langdon
- 1934. Archaeological History of Iran, by Ernst E. Herzfeld
- 1935. The Origins of Early Semitic Ritual, by S. H. Hooke
- 1936. The Cuneiform Texts of Ras Shamra-Ugarit, by Claude F. A. Schaeffer
- 1937. Early Churches in Palestine, by John Winter Crowfoot
- 1938. The Work of the Chronicler: Its Purpose and its Date, by Adam C. Welch
- 1939. The Hebrew Bible in Art, by Jacob Leveen
- 1940. Isaiah Chapters XL–LV: Literary Criticism and History, by Sidney Smith
- 1941. The Cairo Geniza, by Paul E. Kahle
- 1942. Some Hellenistic Elements in Primitive Christianity, by Wilfred Knox
- 1943. The Poem of Job: A Literary Study with a New Translation, by William Barron Stevenson
- 1944. Semitic Writing, from Pictograph to Alphabet, by G. R. Driver
- 1945. Ideas of Divine Rule in the Ancient East, by C. J. Gadd
- 1946. The Text of the Epistles: A Disquisition upon the Corpus Paulinum, by G. Zuntz
- 1947. The Contribution of Demotic to the Study of Egyptian History, by Stephen Glanville
- 1948. From Joseph to Joshua: Biblical Traditions in the Light of Archaeology, by H. H. Rowley
- 1949. French: Les Archives de Mari dans ses Rapports avec l'Ancien Testament, by Georges Dossin
- 1950. The Phoenicians, by A. M. Honeyman
- 1951. The Original Form of the Old New Testament, by G. D. Kilpatrick
- 1953. French: Les Araméens, by André Dupont-Sommer
- 1955. Assyria and the Old Testament, by Max Mallowan
- 1957. French: Une collection de Paroles de Jésus récemment découverte: L'Évangile selon Thomas, by Henri-Charles Puech
- 1959. French: L'Archéologie et les Manuscrits de la Mer Morte, by Roland de Vaux
- 1961. Social Organisation of Pre-Islamic South Arabia, by Alfred Felix Landon Beeston
- 1963. Amorites and Canaanites, by Kathleen M. Kenyon
- 1965. Mari, Ugarit, Hamath: Archaeological Contributions from Ancient Syria to the Old Testament, by Harald Ingholt
- 1967. Ethiopia and the Bible, by Edward Ullendorff
- 1970. Hazor, by Yigael Yadin
- 1972. The Church of the Holy Sepulchre in Jerusalem, by Charles Coüasnon
- 1974. French: Mari et l'Ancien Testament, by André Parrot
- 1976. Some Aspects of Hittite Religion, by O. R. Gurney
- 1977. Manuscript, Society and Belief in Early Christian Egypt, by Colin H. Roberts
- 1983. Nebuchadrezzar and Babylon, by D. J. Wiseman
- 1984. Mari and the Early Israelite Experience, by Abraham Malamat
- 1986. The Variable Spellings of the Hebrew Bible, by James Barr
- 1989. The Bible in the Syriac Churches, by Sebastian Brock
- 1992. Ancient Interpretation of Sacred Books, by Henry Chadwick
- 1995. Translating the Bible: The Ethiopic Version of the Old Testament, by Michael A. Knibb
- 1998. Symbol Systems of Ancient Palestine, in the light of Scarabs and Similar Seal-amulets, by Othmar Keel
- 2001. Idols of the People: Miniature Images of Clay in the Ancient Near East, by P. R. S. Moorey
- 2004. Ashkelon, Seaport of the Canaanites and the Philistines, by Lawrence Stager
- 2007. Ugaritic and the Beginnings of the West-Semitic Literary Tradition by Dennis G. Pardee
- 2008. Archaeology and the Bible: A Broken Link? by Graham Davies
- 2010. Religion and Community in the Roman Near East: Constantine to Mahomet, by Fergus Millar
- 2013. Levantine Epigraphy and History in the Achaemenid Period, by André Lemaire
- 2016. Re-excavating Jerusalem: Archival Archaeology, by Kay Prag
- 2019. The Dead Sea Scrolls as archaeological artefacts, by George J. Brooke
- 2022. Ancient Synagogues in Palestine: A Re-evaluation Nearly a Century After Sukenik's Schweich Lectures, by Jodi Magness
- 2025. Assyria in the 7th century BC, by Karen Radner
