= Ochus =

Ochus may refer to:

- Mochus, e.g. in Diogenes Laertius
- King Darius II of Persia, originally called Ochus
- King Artaxerxes III of Persia, originally called Ochus
- Ochus, son of Darius III of Persia
- An old name for the Panj River
- Ochus (butterfly), a genus of butterflies in the grass skipper family
