= Benjamin Sommer =

American biblical scholar and Jewish theologian (born 1964)

Benjamin D. Sommer
- Born: July 6, 1964 (age 62)
- Occupations: Biblical scholar and Jewish theologian

Academic background
- Education: B.A., Philosophy and Judaic Studies; M.A., Hebrew Bible and Ancient Near East; Ph. D., Bible/Religion
- Alma mater: Yale University; Brandeis University; The University of Chicago

Benjamin D. Sommer (Hebrew: בנימין זומר; born July 6, 1964) is an American biblical scholar and Jewish theologian. He is a Professor of Bible at The Jewish Theological Seminary of America and a Senior Fellow at the Shalom Hartman Institute. He is a former director of the Crown Family Center for Jewish Studies at Northwestern University.

Sommer's research encompass areas of biblical theology, history of Israelite religion, and modern Jewish thought. He is the author of A Prophet Reads Scripture: Allusion in Isaiah 40-66, The Bodies of God and the World of Ancient Israel, and Revelation and Authority: Sinai in Jewish Scripture and Tradition.

Sommer was elected to membership in the Biblical Colloquium in 2014 and to membership in the American Academy for Jewish Research in 2017.

== Personal life and education ==
Sommer was raised in Hillsdale, New Jersey.

Sommer graduated summa cum laude and received his B.A. degree in Philosophy and Judaic Studies from Yale University in 1986. He also studied at the department of Bible at Hebrew University. He received his M.A. degree in Hebrew Bible and Ancient Near East from Brandeis University in 1991. Sommer completed his Doctoral studies in Bible/Religion from University of Chicago in 1994.

He has been a resident of Teaneck, New Jersey. Described as "an observant Conservative Jew", he belongs to Teaneck's Congregation Beth Sholom.

Sommer currently has 3 children.

== Career ==
Following his Doctoral studies, Sommer joined Northwestern University as an Assistant Professor and was promoted to Associate Professor of Religion in 2000. He also held multiple appointments as Director of the Crown Family Center for Jewish Studies during his tenure at the University. In 2008, he left Northwestern University and was appointed by The Jewish Theological Seminary of America as a Professor of Bible and Ancient Semitic Languages.

Sommer has been a Fellow of Tikvah Center for Law and Jewish Civilization at New York University Law School, and of Israel Institute for Advanced Studies in the 2010s.

== Research ==
Sommer specializes in Biblical theology, literary study of the Bible, History of Israelite religion, ancient Near Eastern religion and mythology, midrash, prophecy, Psalms, the composition of the Pentateuch, and modern Jewish thought. His work often deals with the continuities between biblical theology and Jewish thought in the rabbinic, medieval, and modern periods.

=== A Prophet Reads Scripture: Allusion in Isaiah 40-66 ===
Sommer published his first book, A Prophet Reads Scripture: Allusion in Isaiah 40-66 (Contraversions: Jews and Other Differences) in 1998. It examines the way that the author of Isaiah 40–66, often referred to as "Deutero-Isaiah," reworked borrowed vocabulary, imagery, and ideas from earlier biblical authors, especially Jeremiah, First Isaiah, and various Psalms. According to Sommer, the frequency of allusion in these chapters points towards changes in prophecy during the late sixth century, as Israelite religion became increasingly oriented towards finding God not in a sacred space or a temple but in sacred texts. He also argues that the consistent methods of allusion found in chapters 40-66 suggest that these chapters are a literary unity and undermine the widespread theory that chapters 56-66 are a distinct compositional unit.

Robert Alter reviewed Sommer's book as "an original and deeply instructive contribution to biblical studies" that "leads us to understand the development of later biblical history in a new way" The book was also reviewed by R.E. Clements as a "valuable and highly useful study".

=== The Bodies of God and the World of Ancient Israel ===
In 2009, Sommer published The Bodies of God and the World of Ancient Israel. This book examines conceptions of the divine in ancient Israel. Sommer argues that some biblical authors (including the J and E sources of the Pentateuch, Isaiah, and various Psalms) believed that the deity Yhwh had multiple bodies that took manifold forms, while others (including the D and P sources of the Pentateuch) insisted that Yhwh has only one body. According to Sommer, the Bible records a debate between these two theological intuitions that continues in later Jewish sources. Sommer also argues that, contrary to what Jews and Christians today believe, no biblical (or rabbinic) authors believed in a non-corporeal deity. The book also contains a lengthy discussion of the nature of ancient Israelite monotheism, which Sommer believes was more widespread than many modern biblical scholars presume. Sommer also criticizes William G. Dever's book Did God Have a Wife? for stating that the biblical authors "did not wish to acknowledge the popularity and the powerful influence" of polytheism in ancient Israel. In fact, argues Sommer, "biblical authors constantly acknowledge the widespread polytheism of Israelites, and they mention Israelite goddess worship specifically on a number of occasions".

Reviewing the book, Aaron Koller wrote that "the book and the writing are characterized by depth and wisdom". He stated the book as "wise, illuminating, informative, thought provoking, and often convincing" and that "Sommer has put all students of Bible, Judaism, and religion in his debt" Adam Kirsch reviewed the book as "an ingenious new book by Benjamin D. Sommer, sounds like a paradox, and a provocative one." He stated that "The Bodies of God is a formidably complex and technical book" and that Sommer "succeeds in creatively unsettling the reader's view of what the Jewish God is and might be".

S. Tamar Kamionkowski "enthusiastically recommended this book to all who have an interest in biblical scholarship and Jewish intellectual history".

Writing in H-Judaic, Bruce Wells stated that "the book is a stunning foray into ancient Israelite religious traditions that produces new insights and raises critically important questions" According to Wells, Sommer's work on the identification of the fluidity traditions "will likely influence much future scholarship on Israelite religion and the Hebrew Bible for years, if not decades, to come."

=== Revelation and Authority: Sinai in Jewish Scripture and Tradition ===
Sommer's book, Revelation and Authority: Sinai in Jewish Scripture and Tradition, published in 2015, develops the concept of what Sommer calls "the participatory theology of revelation" and traces its unfolding from biblical texts to modern Jewish thought. According to this theology, the Pentateuch embodies not only the will of God but also the perceptions and interpretations of that will by generations of ancient Israelites. This participatory theology appears in some parts of the Pentateuch itself, especially the E and P sources. Other biblical authors (including the Pentateuch's D source) reject this theology, upholding instead what Sommer terms "the stenographic theory of revelation," according to which the Pentateuch contains God's exact words, transcribed by Moses. Publishers Weekly described this book as a "groundbreaking work" which is "an important read for Jewish laypeople, clergy, and scholars" and "also likely to appeal to non-Jews who want to make modern biblical scholarship relevant for believers" Ethan Schwartz stated that "readers who finish Sommer's long but engaging book might conclude that what makes it unique is its suggestion that Jews actively participate in the creation and determination of Torah". The book was also reviewed as "clear, bold, and innovative"

According to a review in Reading Religion, "this is a masterful work, integrating strands and patterns in biblical, rabbinic, medieval, and modern Jewish thought into a constructive scholarly project". Greg Seppi stated that "a general reader interested in Jewish history and theology will likely find this text to be an excellent introduction to biblical criticism and a study of the Jewish faith tradition today".

A Hebrew edition of the book was published by Carmel Press in 2022, with the title, התגלות וסמכות: סיני במקרא ובמסורת.

=== Dating biblical texts ===
In a 2011 essay, "Dating Pentateuchal Texts and the Perils of Pseudo–Historicism," Sommer argues that the most common methods biblical critics use to date biblical texts are fundamentally flawed. Consequently, in his view, most datings of biblical texts in modern scholarly literature are "worthless." Sommer maintains that biblical critics misapply historicist methods, often assuming a simplistic correlation between the political conditions of a given era and the ideas that thinkers in that era must have been thinking. Concurring with the historian of religion Mircea Eliade and the scholar of kabbalah Moshe Idel, Sommer critiques the tendency of reductionist scholars of religion to avoid acknowledging the deep and enduring humanistic significance of much religious literature, an avoidance that Sommer terms "the pseudo-historicist cop-out."

=== Dialogical biblical theology ===
Sommer has developed the notion of what he calls dialogical biblical theology, especially in a lengthy 2009 article with that name. He argues that modern scholars who fashion themselves as biblical theologians not only describe the ancient Israelite religious ideas found in the Bible but put those ideas in dialogue with later ideas and texts from their own religious tradition. This dialogue may be implicit or explicit, and the modern scholar may create this dialogue consciously or unconsciously. Sommer maintains that biblical theologians should acknowledge this aspect of their work, rather than hiding it or denying it. He further argues that Jewish biblical scholars have long been engaged in this sort of work, even though they rarely use the term biblical theology.

== Awards and honors ==
- 1998 - A Prophet Reads Scripture: Allusion in Isaiah received the Salo Wittmayer Baron Prize for the best first book published in ancient or medieval Jewish Studies, American Academy for Jewish Research.
- 1998 - 1999 - American Council of Learned Societies Fellowship
- 1998 - 1999 - Yad Hanadiv/Beracha Foundation Fellowship
- 2009 - The Bodies of God and the World of Ancient Israel received the Award for Excellence in the Study of Religion, for the best book in religious studies focusing on textual analysis published in 2009, American Academy of Religion.
- 2009 - The Bodies of God and the World of Ancient Israel The Jordan Schnitzer Award, for the best book published in biblical studies, rabbinics, or archaeology in the years 2006–2009, awarded by the Association for Jewish Studies
- 2014 - Elected to membership, the Biblical Colloquium
- 2016 - Revelation and Authority: Sinai in Jewish Scripture and Tradition received the Goldstein-Goren Prize, for the best book in Jewish thought published in the years 2014– 2016, Ben-Gurion University of the Negev
- 2017 - Elected to membership, the American Academy for Jewish Research

== Bibliography ==
=== Books ===
- A Prophet Reads Scripture: Allusion in Isaiah 40-66 (Contraversions: Jews and Other Differences) (1998) ISBN 978-0-8047-3216-1
- The Bodies of God and the World of Ancient Israel (2009) ISBN 978-1-139-47778-9
- Revelation and Authority: Sinai in Jewish Scripture and Tradition (2015) ISBN 978-0-300-15873-1
- Yehezkel Kaufmann and the Reinvention of Jewish Exegesis of the Bible, co-edited with Thomas Staubli and Job Jindo (2017) ISBN 978-3-525-54414-3
- Jewish Concepts of Scripture: A Comparative Introduction (New York: New York University Press, 2012). ISBN 978-0-8147-6002-4

=== Selected articles ===
- Sommer, B. D. (1996). Did prophecy cease? Evaluating a reevaluation. Journal of Biblical Literature, 115(1), 31–47.
- Sommer, B. D. (1999). Revelation at Sinai in the Hebrew Bible and in Jewish theology. The Journal of religion, 79(3), 422–451.
- Sommer, B. D. (1999). Reflecting on Moses: The Redaction of Numbers 11. Journal of Biblical Literature, 118(4), 601–624.
- Sommer, B. (1996). Exegesis, allusion and intertextuality in the Hebrew Bible: A response to Lyle Eslinger. Vetus Testamentum, 46(4), 479–489.
- Sommer, B.D. (2009). "Dialogical Biblical Theology: A Jewish Approach to Reading Scripture Theologically," in Biblical Theology: Introducing the Conversation (edited by Leo Perdue; Library of Biblical Theology, volume 1; Nashville: Abingdon Press), 1–53, 265–285
- Sommer, B.D. (2011). "Dating Pentateuchal Texts and the Perils of Pseudo–Historicism," in The Pentateuch: International Perspectives on Current Research (edited by Thomas Dozeman, Konrad Schmid and Baruch Schwartz; Forschungen zum Alten Testament 78; Tübingen: Mohr Siebeck), 85–108
- Sommer, B. D. (2015). Nature, Revelation, and Grace in Psalm 19: Towards a Theological Reading of Scripture. Harvard Theological Review, 108(3), 376–401.
