= Jerome Beale =

Beale, Jerome (d. 1631), college head

Jerome Beale was Master of Pembroke from 1619 to 1630; and Vice-Chancellor of the University of Cambridge in 1622 to 1623.

Beale was born in Worcestershire. He graduated B.A. from Christ's College, Cambridge in 1596; M.A. from Pembroke College, Cambridge in 1599; B.D. in 1607 and D.D. in 1619. He held livings at Cowfold, West Wittering, Nuthurst, Hardwicke and Willingham.

Beale cited and defended the Dutch Arminian literature. He held Arminian views.

== Notes and references ==
=== Sources ===
- Höfele, Andreas; Laqué, Stephan; Ruge, Enno (2007). Representing Religious Pluralization in Early Modern Europe. Berlin: Lit.
- Milton, Anthony (2002). Catholic and Reformed: The Roman and Protestant Churches in English Protestant Thought, 1600-1640. Cambridge: Cambridge University Press.

Academic offices
Preceded by Nicholas Felton	Master of Pembroke College, Cambridge; 1619–1630	Succeeded by Benjamin Laney
Preceded by Leonard Mawe	Vice-Chancellor of the University of Cambridge; 1622–1623	Succeeded by Thomas Paske
