= Richard C. Steiner =

American linguist

Richard Steiner
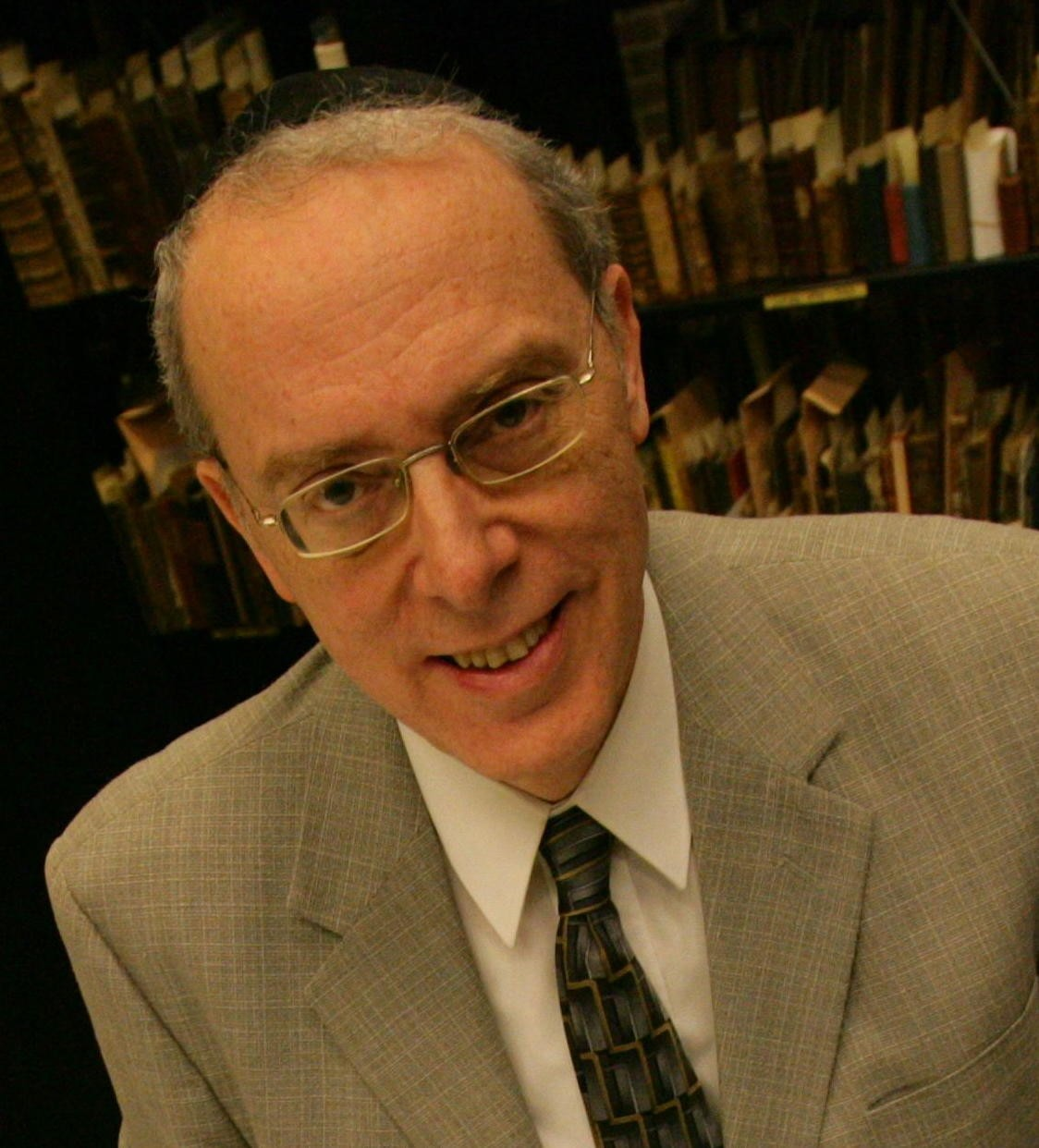
- Born: 1945 (age 80–81)
- Education: Yeshiva University, University of Pennsylvania
- Occupation: Professor of Semitics
- Employer: Bernard Revel Graduate School of Yeshiva University

Richard C. Steiner (born 1945) is a Semitist and a scholar of Northwest Semitic languages, Jewish Studies, and Near Eastern texts. His work has focused on texts from as early as the Egyptian Pyramid Texts to as late as medieval biblical interpretation. He is now retired from his position as professor of Semitics at the Bernard Revel Graduate School of Yeshiva University in New York City.

== Life and career ==
Steiner received his PhD from the University of Pennsylvania, where he studied Biblical, Semitic, and Jewish Studies (under Moshe Greenberg, later of the Hebrew University) and linguistics (under Henry M. Hoenigswald and William Labov). He collaborated with Labov on an important study of sound changes in spoken languages.

Steiner's early work focused on the phonology of Semitic languages, especially Hebrew. In one book he argued that the letter known as Hebrew sin was pronounced as a fricative-lateral and in another he argued that the pronunciation of the letter tsade as an affricate, /ts/, is very old and widespread, against others who had doubted this. These books have convinced most specialists.

In 2007 Steiner gave a lecture at the Hebrew University of Jerusalem, in which he announced that he had deciphered linguistically Semitic spells in Egyptian hieroglyphic texts from the mid-third millennium BC. This discovery was reported on by National Geographic, Science Daily, and others. Other scholars question these findings due to phonological inconsistencies, orthographic anomalies, and methodological flaws and a few Egyptologists have even rejected Steiner's claims, but they have been accepted by most scholars working on ancient Semitic and Egyptian.

In July 2010 he was invited to give the plenary address at the annual conference of the National Association of Professors of Hebrew.

Among his PhD students is Aaron Koller, who co-edited Steiner's Festschirft and later became Regius Professor of Hebrew at the University of Cambridge.

His brother was Mark Steiner, Professor of Philosophy at Hebrew University, who died from COVID-19 in 2020.

== Books ==
- A Quantitative Study of Sound Change in Progress (Report on National Science Foundation Contract NSF-GS-3287). 2 vols. Philadelphia, 1972 (William Labov, Malcah Yaeger, and Richard Steiner).
- The Case for Fricative-Laterals in Proto-Semitic (American Oriental Series, 59), New Haven, 1977.
- Affricated Sade in the Semitic Languages (American Academy for Jewish Research Monograph Series, 3), New York, 1982.
- Stockmen from Tekoa, Sycomores from Sheba: A Study of Amos’ Occupations (CBQ Monograph Series, 36), Washington DC, 2003.
- A Biblical Translation in the Making: The Evolution and Impact of Saadia Gaon’s Tafsīr (Harvard Judaic Monographs, 2011)
- Early Northwest Semitic Serpent Spells in the Pyramid Texts (Harvard Semitic Studies 61; Winona Lake: Eisenbrauns, 2011)
- Disembodied souls: the Nefesh in Israel and kindred spirits in the ancient Near East, with an appendix on the Katumuwa inscription, SBL Press, 2015 (from the Official SBL website)

== Articles ==
- “On the Origin of the חֶדֶר-חֲדַר Alternation in Hebrew,” Afroasiatic Linguistics 3(1976) 85-102.
- “From Proto-Hebrew to Mishnaic Hebrew: The History of כְָ- and הָּ-,” Hebrew Annual Review 3 (1979) 157–174.
- “Yuqat.t.il, Yaqat.t.il, Yiqat.t.il: D-Stem Prefix-Vowels and a Constraint on Reduction in Hebrew and Aramaic,” Journal of the American Oriental Society 100 (1980) 513–518.
- “A Paganized Version of Ps 20:2-6 from the Aramaic Text in Demotic Script,” Journal of the American Oriental Society 103 (1983) 261-74 (with C. F. Nims). (Cf. Charles Austin, “Ancient Papyrus a Riddle No More,” The New York Times, October 11, 1982, B1 ff.)
- “You Can’t Offer Your Sacrifice and Eat It Too: A Polemical Poem from the Aramaic Text in Demotic Script,” Journal of Near Eastern Studies 43 (1984) 89-114 (with C. F. Nims).
- “Ashurbanipal and Shamash-shum-ukin: A Tale of Two Brothers from the Aramaic Text in Demotic Script,” Revue Biblique 92 (1985) 60-81 (with C.F. Nims).
- “*Lulav versus *lu/law: A Note on the Conditioning of *aw > *ū in Hebrew and Aramaic,” Journal of the American Oriental Society 107 (1987) 121–122.
- “New Light on the Biblical Millo from Hatran Inscriptions,” Bulletin of the American Schools of Oriental Research 276 (1989) 15–23.
- “A Syriac Church Inscription from 504 CE,” Journal of Semitic Studies 35 (1990) 99-108.
- “The Aramaic Text in Demotic Script: The Liturgy of a New Year’s Festival Imported from Bethel to Syene by Exiles from Rash,” Journal of the American Oriental Society 111 (1991) 362–363.
- “The Mountains of Ararat, Mount Lubar and הר הקדם,” Journal of Jewish Studies 42 (1991) 247-249
- "Does the Biblical Hebrew Conjunction -ו Have Many Meanings, One Meaning, or No Meaning At All?," Journal of Biblical Literature 119/2 (2000), 249–267.
- "On the Dating of Hebrew Sound Changes and Greek Translations (2 Esdras and Judith)", JBL (20015), 229-267
- "Bishlam's archival search report in Nehemiah's archive: Multiple introductions and reverse chronological order as clues to the origin of the Aramaic letters in Ezra 4-6", JBL (2006), 641-685
- "Phonemic Spelling and Scriptio Continua for Sandhi Phenomena and Glottal Stop Deletion: Proto-Sinaitic vs. Hebrew", JNES (2016), 311-334
- "The Practice of the Land of Egypt (Leviticus 18:3): Incest, 'Anat, and Israel in the Egypt of Ramesses the Great" in (eds. Hoffmeier, Millard, Rendsburg) "Did I Not Bring Israel Out of Egypt?": Biblical, Archaeological, and Egyptological Perspectives on the Exodus Narratives, BBR Supplements, 2017, pp. 79–92
- "He Said, He Said”: Repetition of the Quotation Formula in the Joseph Story and Other Biblical Narratives", JBL (2019), 473-495
- "Contradictions, Culture Gaps, and Narrative Gaps in the Joseph Story", JBL (2020), 439-458
- "The Book of the Wars of the Lord (Num. 21: 14–20): Philology and Hydrology, Geography and Ethnography", JAOS (2020), 563-591
