= Robert Spaulding =

English scholar and translator

Robert Spaulding was an English scholar, Fellow of St John's College, Cambridge and one of the translators, in the "First Cambridge Company", of the King James Version of the Bible. The company translated from 1 Chronicles to the Song of Solomon. He succeeded Edward Lively as Regius Professor of Hebrew at Cambridge.
