= William Disney =

English clergyman and academic

The Reverend William Disney
- Born: 29 September 1731
- Died: 28 March 1807 (aged 75)
- Education: Trinity College, Cambridge
- Occupation: Regius Professor of Hebrew
- Offices held: Vicar of Pluckley, Kent

William Disney, D.D. (1731–1807) was an English clergyman and academic, and one of the critics of Edward Gibbon.

== Life ==
Son of the Rev. Joseph Disney, M.A., vicar of Cranbrook and Appledore with the chapel of Ebony in Kent, was born 29 September 1731. He was educated at Merchant Taylors' School under Mr. Creech, and entered as a pensioner at Trinity College, Cambridge on 26 January 1748. He graduated as B.A. in 1753 (when he was senior wrangler), M.A. 1756, and D.D. 1789. He was admitted minor fellow in 1754, major fellow in 1756, and third sub-lector in 1757.

From 1757 to 1771 he was Regius Professor of Hebrew. In 1777 he became vicar of Pluckley in Kent, a living in the gift of the Archbishop of Canterbury, where he died on 28 March 1807.

== Family ==
On 9 January 1782, at the age of 50, he married Anna Maria Smyth, herself aged 45, third daughter of John Smyth (1686-1746), a landowner at Chart Sutton in Kent, and his wife Elizabeth Whitfield (1711-1786). There were no children.

== Works ==
He published two sermons:

- 1789: Sermon preached before the University of Cambridge, 28 June 1789, with some strictures on the licentious notions avowed or enumerated in Mr. Gibbon's History of Rome London: Cambridge University Press
- 1800: The Superiority of Religious Duties to Worldly Considerations, London: S. Johnson
