= Ralph Cudworth =

English clergyman, theologian, philosopher, and Cambridge Platonist (1617–1688)

The Reverend Ralph Cudworth FRS
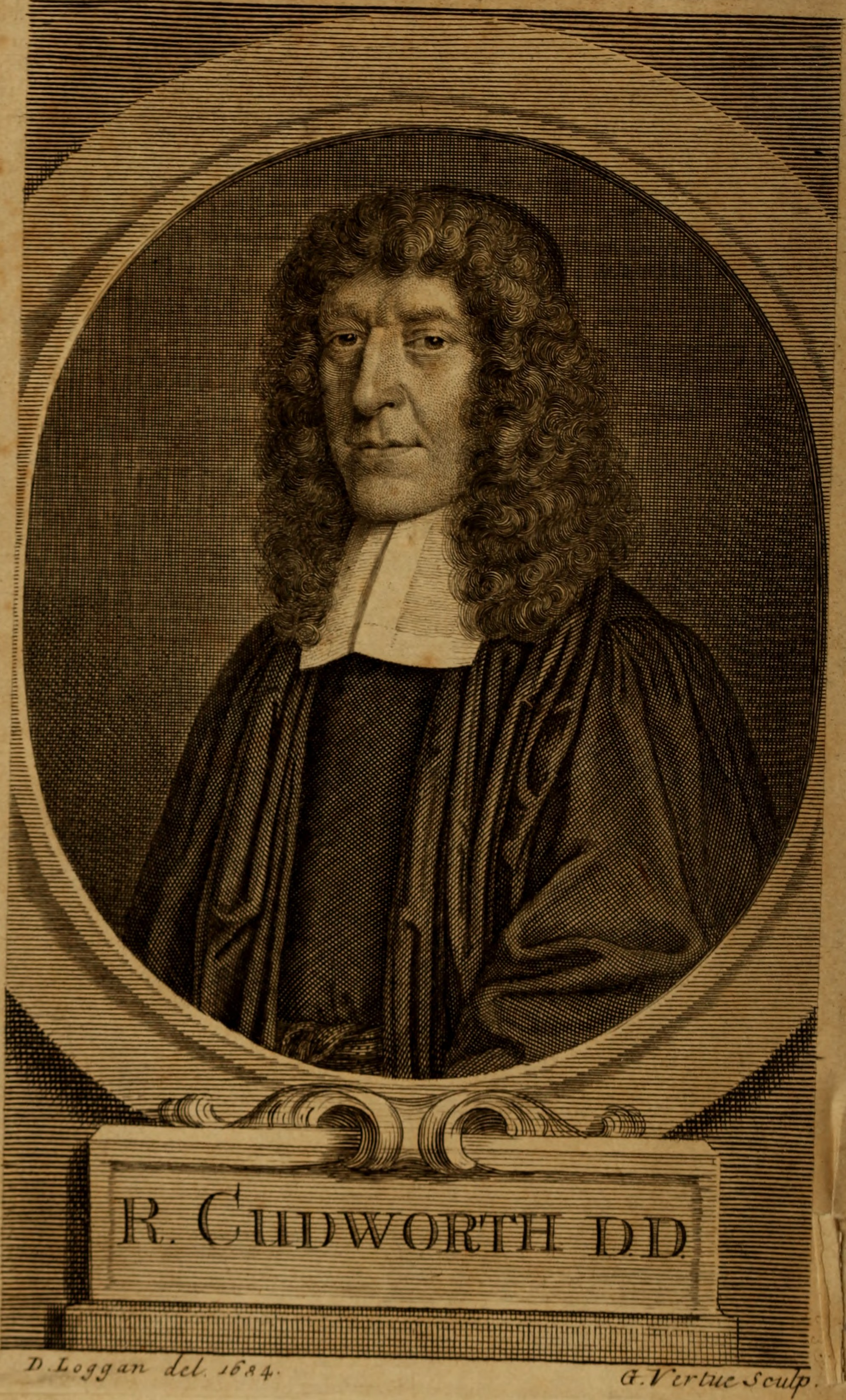

11th Regius Professor of Hebrew University of Cambridge
- In office 1645–1688
- Preceded by: Robert Metcalfe
- Succeeded by: Wolfram Stubbe

14th Master of Christ's College, Cambridge
- In office 1654–1688
- Preceded by: Samuel Bolton
- Succeeded by: John Covel

26th Master of Clare Hall, Cambridge
- In office 1645–1654
- Preceded by: Thomas Paske
- Succeeded by: Theophilus Dillingham

Personal details
- Born: 1617 Aller, Somersetshire, Kingdom of England
- Died: 26 June 1688 (aged 70–71) Cambridge, Cambridgeshire, Kingdom of England
- Spouse: Damaris Cradock Andrewes (m. 1654)
- Children: 4, including Damaris Cudworth Masham
- Parents: Ralph Cudworth (Snr); Mary Machell
- Relatives: James Cudworth (brother)
- Education: University of Cambridge: Emmanuel College (BA; MA); Clare Hall (BD; DD)

Ecclesiastical career
- Religion: Christianity
- Church: Church of England
- Ordained: 1650 (priest)
- Offices held: Rector, North Cadbury (1650–1656); Vicar, Great Wilbraham (1656); Rector, Toft (1656–1662); Rector, Ashwell (1662–1688); Prebendary, Gloucester (1678)

Ralph Cudworth (/ˈreɪf ˈkʌdwɜːrθ/; 1617 – 26 June 1688) was an English Anglican clergyman, Christian Hebraist, classicist, theologian and philosopher, and a leading figure among the Cambridge Platonists who became 11th Regius Professor of Hebrew (1645–1688), 26th Master of Clare Hall (1645–1654), and 14th Master of Christ's College (1654–1688). A leading opponent of Hobbes's political and philosophical views, his magnum opus was his The True Intellectual System of the Universe (1678).

== Family background ==
Cudworth's family reputedly originated in Cudworth (near Barnsley), Yorkshire, moving to Lancashire with the marriage (c.1377) of John de Cudworth (died 1384) and Margery (died 1384), daughter of Richard de Oldham (living 1354), lord of the manor of Werneth, Oldham. The Cudworths of Werneth Hall, Oldham, were lords of the manor of Werneth/Oldham, until 1683. Ralph Cudworth (the philosopher)'s father, Ralph Cudworth (Snr), was the posthumous-born second son of Ralph Cudworth (d.1572) of Werneth Hall, Oldham.

The philosopher's father, Ralph Cudworth (1572/73–1624), was educated at Emmanuel College, Cambridge, where he graduated with a BA in 1592/93 and an MA in 1596. Emmanuel College (founded by Sir Walter Mildmay (1584), and under the direction of its first Master, Laurence Chaderton) was, from its inception, a stronghold of Reformist, Puritan and Calvinist teaching, which shaped the development of Puritan ministry, and contributed largely to the emigrant ministry in America. Ordained in 1599 and elected to a college fellowship by 1600, Cudworth Snr was much influenced by William Perkins, whom he succeeded, in 1602, as Lecturer of the Parish Church of St Andrew the Great, Cambridge. He was awarded the degree of Bachelor of Divinity in 1603. He edited Perkins's Commentary on St Paul's Epistle to the Galatians (1604), with a dedication to Robert, 3rd Lord Rich (later 1st Earl of Warwick), adding a commentary of his own with dedication to Sir Bassingbourn Gawdy. Lord Rich presented him to the Vicariate of Coggeshall, Essex (1606) to replace the deprived minister Thomas Stoughton, but he resigned this position (March 1608), and was licensed to preach from the pulpit by the Chancellor and Scholars of the University of Cambridge (November 1609). He then applied for the rectorate of Aller, Somerset (an Emmanuel College living) and, resigning his fellowship, was appointed to it in 1610.

His marriage (1611) to Mary Machell, (who had been "nutrix" – wet nurse, or preceptor – to Henry Frederick, Prince of Wales) brought important connections. Cudworth Snr was appointed as one of James I's chaplains. Mary's mother (or aunt) was the sister of Sir Edward Lewknor, a central figure (with the Jermyn and Heigham families) among the Puritan East Anglian gentry, whose children had attended Emmanuel College. Mary's Lewknor and Machell connections with the Rich family included her first cousins Sir Nathaniel Rich and his sister Dame Margaret Wroth, wife of Sir Thomas Wroth of Petherton Park near Bridgwater, Somerset, influential promoters of colonial enterprise (and later of nonconformist emigration) in New England. Aller was immediately within their sphere.

The children of Ralph Cudworth Snr and Mary (née Machell) Cudworth were:

- General James Cudworth (1612–82) was Assistant Governor (1756–1758, 1674–1680) and Deputy Governor (1681–82) of Plymouth Colony, Massachusetts, and four-times Commissioner of the United Colonies (1657–1681), whose descendants form an extensive family of American Cudworths.
- Elizabeth Cudworth (1615–1654) married (1636) Josias Beacham of Broughton, Northamptonshire (Rector of Seaton, Rutland (1627–1676)), by whom she had several children. Beacham was ejected from his living by the Puritans (1653), but reinstated (by 1662).
- Ralph Cudworth (Jnr)
- Mary Cudworth
- John Cudworth (1622–1675) of London and Bentley, Suffolk, Alderman of London, and Master of the Worshipful Company of Girdlers (1667–68). On his death, John left four orphans of whom both Thomas Cudworth (1661–1726) and Benjamin Cudworth (1670–15 Sept. 1725) attended Christ's College, Cambridge. Benjamin Cudworth's black memorial slab is in St. Margaret's parish church, Southolt, Suffolk.
- Jane/Joan(?) Cudworth (born c.1624; fl. unmarried, 1647) may have been Ralph's sister.

== Career ==
=== Education ===
The second son, and third of five (probably six) children, Ralph Cudworth (Jnr) was born at Aller, Somerset, where he was baptised (13 July 1617). Following the death of his father, Ralph Cudworth Snr (1624), John Stoughton (1593–1639), (son of Thomas Stoughton of Coggeshall; also a Fellow of Emmanuel College), succeeded as Rector of Aller, and married the widow Mary (née Machell) Cudworth. Dr Stoughton paid careful attention to his stepchildren's education, which Ralph later described as a "diet of Calvinism". Letters, to Stoughton, by both brothers James and Ralph Cudworth make this plain; and, when Ralph matriculated at Emmanuel College, Cambridge (1632), Stoughton thought him "as wel grounded in Scho[o]l-Learning as any Boy of his Age that went to the University". Stoughton was appointed Curate and Preacher at St Mary Aldermanbury, London (1632), and the family left Aller. Ralph's elder brother, James Cudworth, married and emigrated to Scituate, Plymouth Colony, New England (1634). Mary Machell Cudworth Stoughton died during summer 1634, and Dr Stoughton married a daughter of John Browne of Frampton and Dorchester.

=== Pensioner, Student and Fellow of Emmanuel College (1630–1645) ===
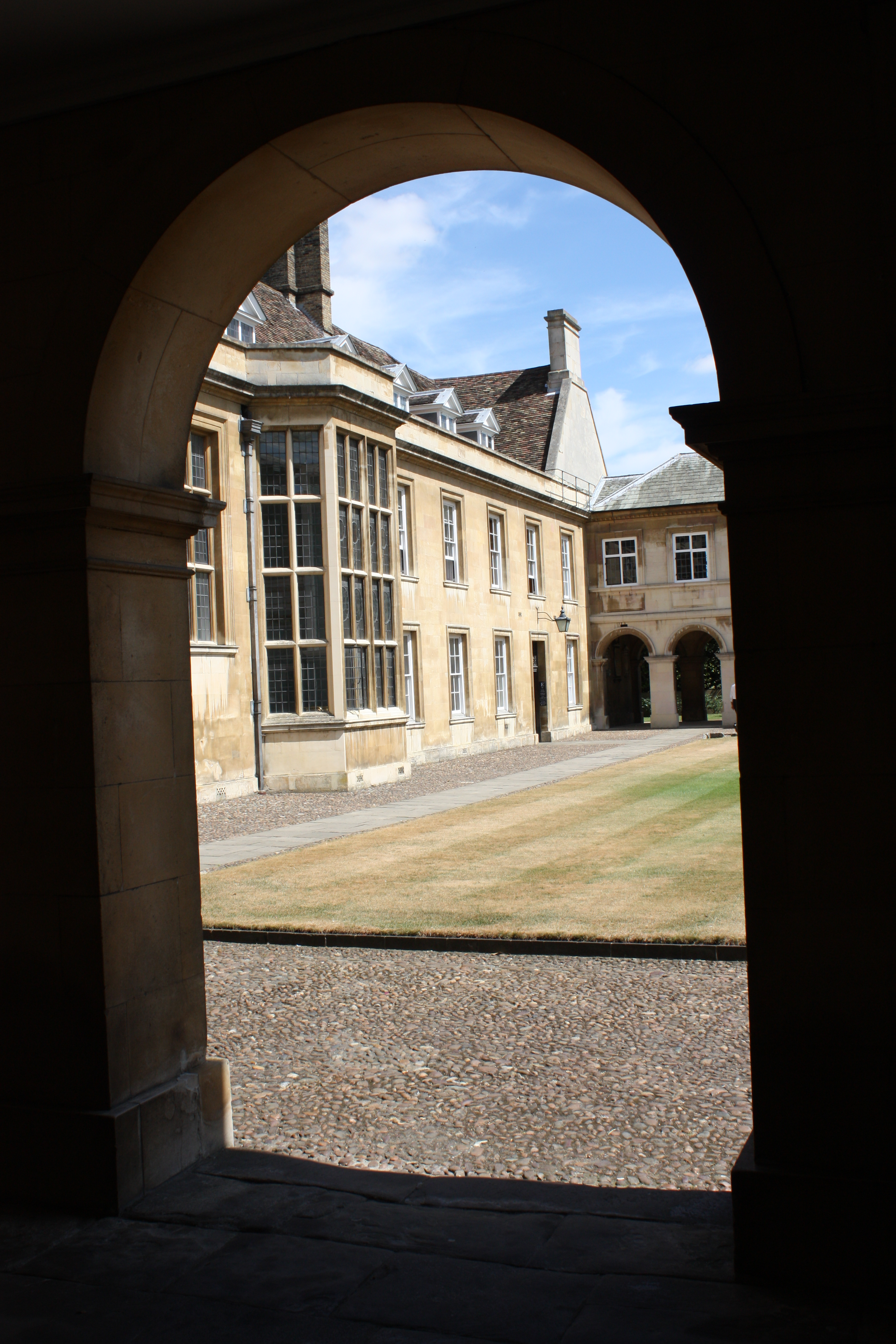
Emmanuel College, Cambridge

From a family background embedded in the early nonconformity and a diligent student, Cudworth was admitted (as a pensioner) to his father's old college, Emmanuel College, Cambridge (1630), matriculated (1632), and graduated (BA (1635/36); MA (1639)). After some misgivings (which he confided in his stepfather), he was elected a Fellow of Emmanuel (1639), and became a successful tutor, delivering the Rede Lecture (1641). He published a tract entitled The Union of Christ and the Church, in a Shadow (1642), and another, A Discourse concerning the True Notion of the Lord's Supper (1642), in which his readings of Karaite manuscripts (stimulated by meetings with Johann Stephan Rittangel) were influential.

=== 11th Regius Professor of Hebrew (1645) and 26th Master of Clare Hall (1645–1654) ===
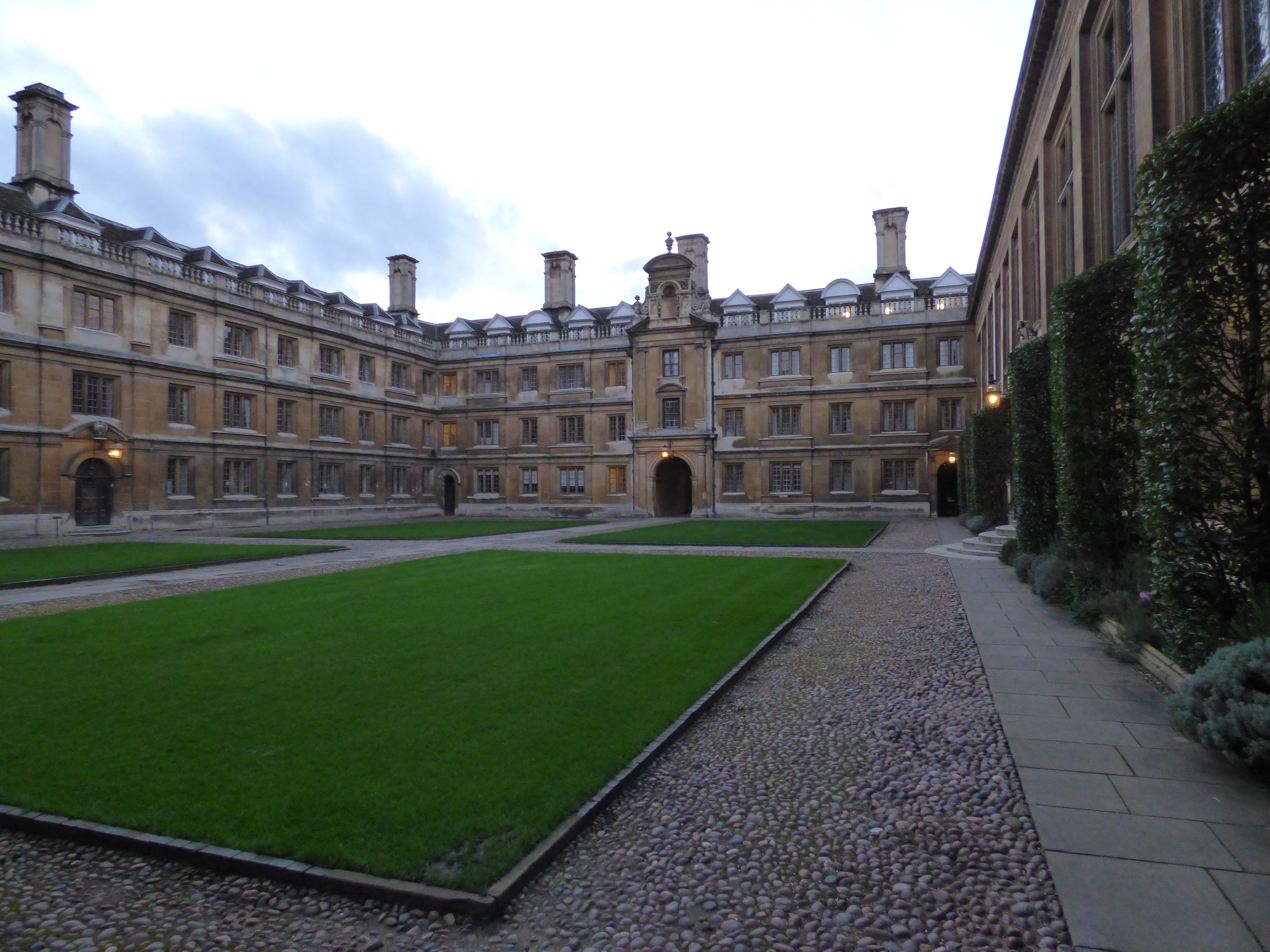
Old Court, Clare College, Cambridge

Following sustained correspondence with John Selden (to whom he supplied Karaite literature), he was elected (aged 28) as 11th Regius Professor of Hebrew (1645). In 1645, Thomas Paske had been ejected as Master of Clare Hall for his Anglican allegiances, and Cudworth (despite his immaturity) was selected as his successor, as 26th Master (but not admitted until 1650). Similarly, his fellow-theologian Benjamin Whichcote was installed as 19th Provost of King's College. Cudworth attained the degree of Bachelor of Divinity (1646), and preached a sermon before the House of Commons of England (on 1 John 2, 3–4), which was later published with a Letter of Dedication to the House (1647). Despite these distinctions and his presentation, by Emmanuel College, to the rectorate of North Cadbury, Somerset (3 October 1650), he remained comparatively impoverished. He was awarded the degree of Doctor of Divinity (1651), and, in January 1651/2, his friend Dr John Worthington wrote of him, "If through want of maintenance he should be forced to leave Cambridge, for which place he is so eminently accomplished with what is noble and Exemplarily Academical, it would be an ill omen."

=== Marriage (1654) and 14th Master of Christ's College (1654–1688) ===
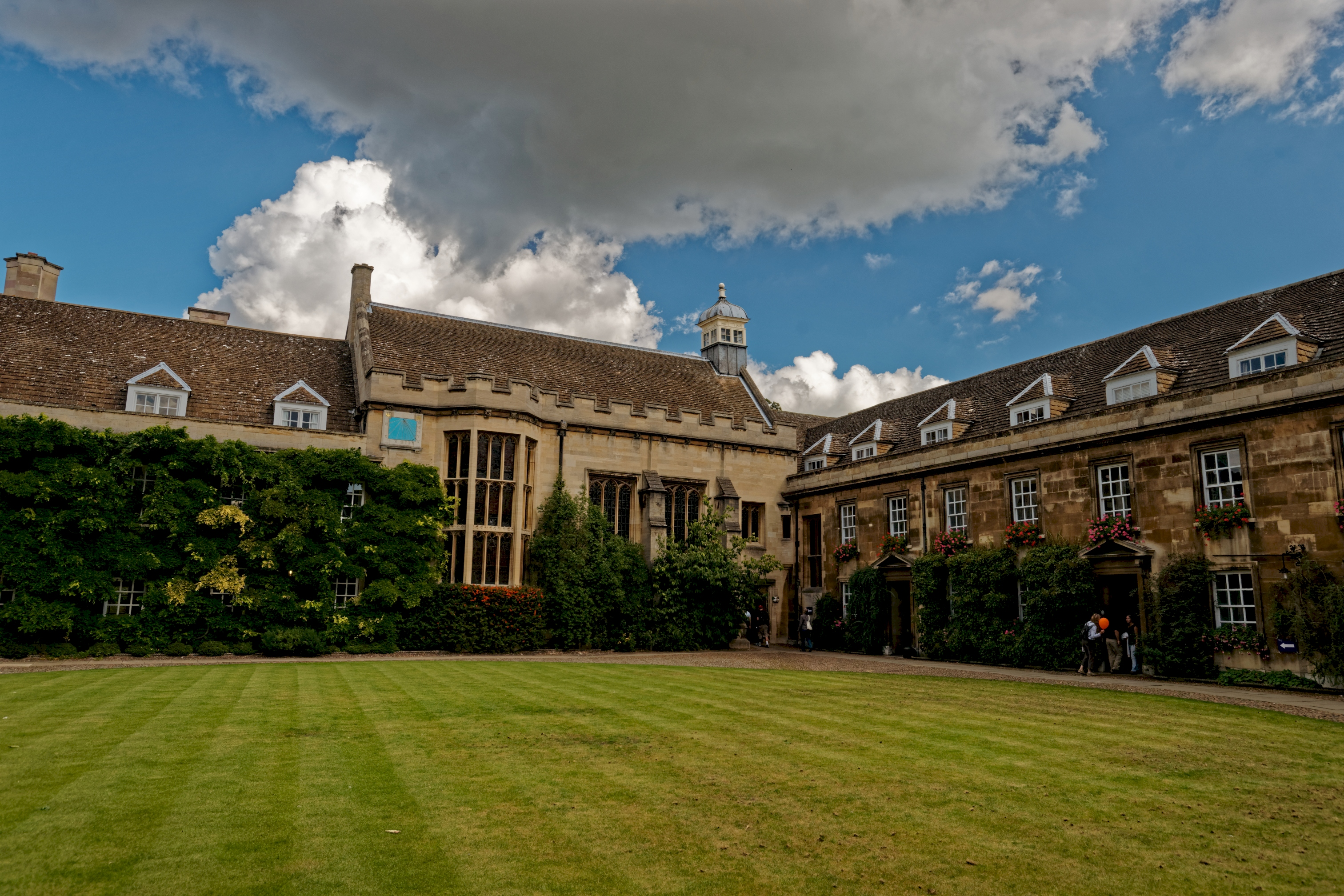
First Court, Christ's College, Cambridge

Despite his worsening sight, Cudworth was elected (29 October 1654) and admitted (2 November 1654), as 14th Master of Christ's College. His appointment coincided with his marriage to Damaris (died 1695), daughter (by his first wife, Damaris) of Matthew Cradock (died 1641), first Governor of the Massachusetts Bay Company. Hence Worthington commented "After many tossings Dr Cudworth is through God's good Providence returned to Cambridge and settled in Christ's College, and by his marriage more settled and fixed."

In his will (1641), Matthew Cradock had divided his estate beside the Mystic River at Medford, Massachusetts (which he had never visited, and was managed on his behalf) into two moieties: one was bequeathed to his daughter Damaris Cradock (died 1695), (later wife of Ralph Cudworth Jnr); and one was to be enjoyed by his widow Rebecca (during her lifetime), and afterwards to be inherited by his brother, Samuel Cradock (1583–1653), and his heirs male. Samuel Cradock's son, Samuel Cradock Jnr (1621–1706), was admitted to Emmanuel (1637), graduated (BA (1640–1); MA (1644); BD (1651)), was later a Fellow (1645–56), and pupil of Benjamin Whichcote's. After part of the Medford estate was rented to Edward Collins (1642), it was placed in the hands of an attorney; the widow Rebecca Cradock (whose second and third husbands were Richard Glover and Benjamin Whichcote, respectively), petitioned the General Court of Massachusetts, and the legatees later sold the estate to Collins (1652).

The marriage of the widow Rebecca Cradock to Cudworth's colleague Benjamin Whichcote laid the way for the union between Cudworth and her stepdaughter Damaris (died 1695), which reinforced the connections between the two scholars through a familial bond. Damaris had first married (1642) Thomas Andrewes Jnr (died 1653) of London and Feltham, son of Sir Thomas Andrewes (died 1659), (Lord Mayor of London, 1649, 1651–2), which union had produced several children. The Andrewes family were also engaged in the Massachusetts project, and strongly supported Puritan causes.

=== Commonwealth and Restoration ===
Cudworth emerged as a central figure among that circle of theologians and philosophers known as the Cambridge Platonists, who were (more or less) in sympathy with the Commonwealth: during the later 1650s, Cudworth was consulted by John Thurloe, Oliver Cromwell's Secretary to the Council of State, with regard to certain university and government appointments and various other matters. During 1657, Cudworth advised Bulstrode Whitelocke's sub-committee of the Parliamentary "Grand Committee for Religion" on the accuracy of editions of the English Bible. Cudworth was appointed Vicar of Great Wilbraham, and Rector of Toft, Cambridgeshire Ely diocese (1656), but surrendered these livings (1661 and 1662, respectively) when he was presented, by Dr Gilbert Sheldon, Bishop of London, to the Hertfordshire Rectory of Ashwell (1 December 1662).

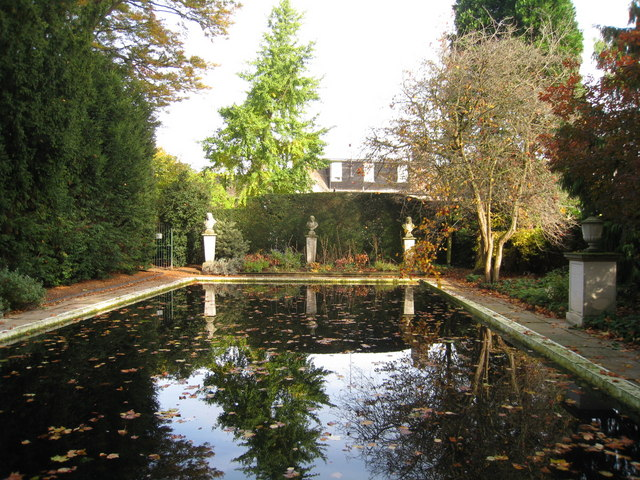
The mid-seventeenth century Fellows' Swimming Pool, Christ's College, Cambridge

Given Cudworth's close cooperation with prominent figures in Oliver Cromwell's regime (such as John Thurloe), Cudworth's continuance as Master of Christ's was challenged at the Restoration but, ultimately, he retained this post until his death. He and his family are believed to have resided in private lodgings at the "Old Lodge" (which stood between Hobson Street and the College Chapel), and various improvements were made to the college rooms in his time. He was elected a Fellow of the Royal Society in 1662.

=== Later life ===
In 1665, Cudworth almost quarrelled with his fellow-Platonist, Henry More, because of the latter's composition of an ethical work which Cudworth feared would interfere with his own long-contemplated treatise on the same subject. To avoid any difficulties, More published his Enchiridion ethicum (1666–69), in Latin; However, Cudworth's planned treatise was never published. His own majestic work, The True Intellectual System of the Universe (1678), was conceived in three parts of which only the first was completed; he wrote: "there is no reason why this volume should therefore be thought imperfect and incomplete, because it hath not all the Three Things at first Designed by us: it containing all that belongeth to its own particular Title and Subject, and being in that respect no Piece, but a Whole."

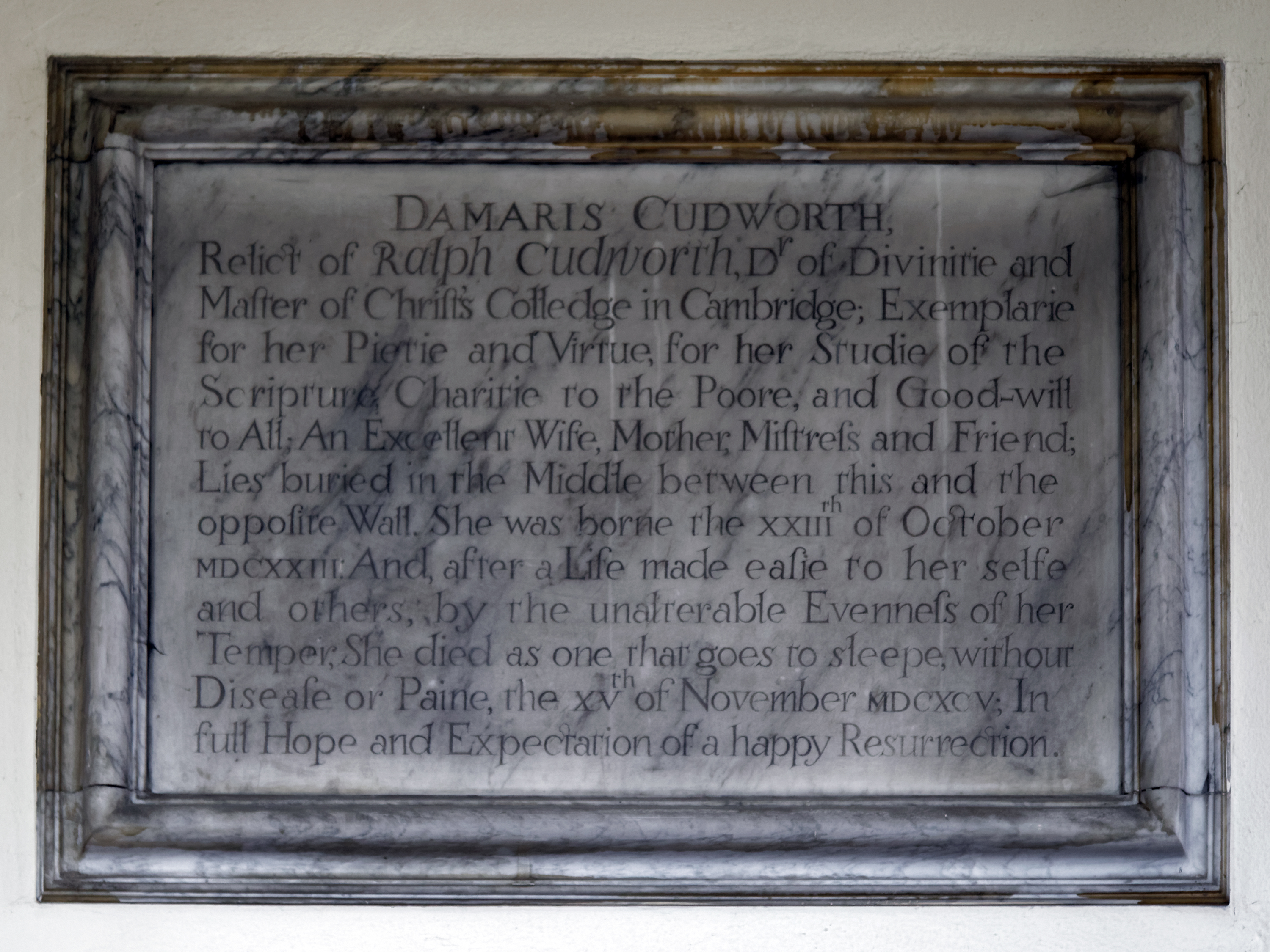
Memorial to Damaris Cudworth

Cudworth was installed as Prebendary of Gloucester (1678). His colleague, Benjamin Whichcote, died at Cudworth's house in Cambridge (1683), and Cudworth himself died (26 June 1688), and was buried in the Chapel of Christ's College. An oil portrait of Cudworth (from life) hangs in the Hall of Christ's College. During Cudworth's time an outdoor Swimming Pool was created at Christ's College (which still exists), and a carved bust of Cudworth there accompanies those of John Milton and Nicholas Saunderson.

Cudworth's widow, Damaris (née Cradock) Andrewes Cudworth (died 1695), maintained close connections with her daughter, Damaris Cudworth Masham, at High Laver, Essex, which was where she died, and was commemorated in the church with a carved epitaph reputedly composed by the philosopher John Locke.

=== Children ===
The children of Ralph Cudworth and Damaris (née Cradock) Andrewes Cudworth were:

- John Cudworth (c.1656–1726) was admitted to Christ's College, Cambridge (1672), graduated (BA (1676–77); MA (1680)), and was a pupil of Mr Andrewes. He was a Fellow (1678–1698), was ordained a priest (1684), and later became Lecturer in Greek (1687/88) and Senior Dean (1690).
- Charles Cudworth (died 1684) was admitted to Trinity College, Cambridge (1674–6), but may have not graduated, instead, making a career in the factories of Kasimbazar, West Bengal, India, which was where John Locke (friend of his sister Damaris Cudworth), corresponded with him (27 April 1683). He married (February 1683/84), Mary Cole, widow of Jonathan Prickman, Second for the English East India Company at Malda. Charles Cudworth died in March 1684.
- Thomas Cudworth graduated at Christ's College, Cambridge (MA (1682)).
- Damaris Cudworth (1659–1708), a devout and talented woman, became the second wife (1685) of Sir Francis Masham, 3rd Baronet (c.1646–1723) of High Laver, Essex. Lady Masham was a friend of the philosopher John Locke, and also a correspondent of Gottfried Leibniz. Her son, Francis Cudworth Masham (died 1731), became Accountant-General to the Court of Chancery.

The stepchildren of Ralph Cudworth (children of Damaris (née Cradock) Andrewes and Thomas Andrewes) were:

- Richard Andrewes (living 1688) who, according to Peile, is not the Richard Andrewes who attended Christ's College, Cambridge during this period.
- John Andrewes (died after 1688?) matriculated at Christ's College, Cambridge (1664), graduated (BA (1668/9); MA (1672)), was ordained deacon and priest (1669–70), and was a Fellow (1669–75). Peile suggests he died c.1675, but he was a legatee in the will of his brother Thomas (1688). John Covel attended a "Pastoral" performed by Cudworth's children contrived by John Andrewes.
- Thomas Andrewes (died 1688), Citizen and Dyer of London, was a linen draper. He married (August 1681), Anna, daughter of Samuel Shute, of St Peter's, Cornhill.
- Mathew Andrewes (died 1674) was admitted to Queens' College, Cambridge (1663/4), and later elected a Fellow.
- Damaris Andrewes (died 1687) married (1661), (as his first wife) Sir Edward Abney (1631–1728), (a student at Christ's College, Cambridge (BA 1649–52/53); Fellow (1655–61); and Doctor of both laws (1661)).

== Philosophy ==
Cudworth was a member of the Cambridge Platonists, a group of English seventeenth-century thinkers associated with the University of Cambridge who were stimulated by Plato's teachings but also were aware of and influenced by Descartes, Hobbes, Bacon, Boyle and Spinoza.

=== Plastic principle ===
The nature, origin, and ethical role of the natural world was a topic of debate from the 1590's to the 1690's and beyond. The prevailing view was either that of the Church of a personal deity intervening in his creation, producing miracles, or an ancient pantheism (atheism relative to theism) – deity pervading all things and existing in all things. However, the "ideas of an all-embracing providential care of the world and of one universal vital force capable of organizing the world from within." presented difficulties for philosophers of a spiritual as well as materialistic bent.

Cudworth countered these mechanical, materialistic views of nature in his True intellectual system of the universe (1678), with the idea of 'the Plastick Life of Nature', a formative principle that contains both substance and the laws of motion, as well as a nisus or direction that accounts for design and goal in the natural world. He was stimulated by the Cartesian idea of the mind as self-consciousness to see God as consciousness. He first analysed four forms of atheism from ancient times to present, and showed that all misunderstood the principle of life and knowledge, which involved unsentient activity and self-consciousness, addressing the tension between theism and atheism, took both the Stoic idea of Divine Reason poured into the world, and the Platonic idea of the world soul (anima mundi) to posit a power that was polaric – "either as a ruling but separate mind or as an informing vital principle – either nous hypercosmios or nous enkosmios. According to the Encyclopædia Britannica:

It is in connection with the refutation of hylozoic atheism that he brings forward the celebrated hypothesis, which he held in common with More, of a plastic nature,—a substance intermediate between matter and spirit,—a power which prosecutes certain ends but not freely or intelligently,—an instrument by which laws are able to act without the immediate agency of God ...

All of the atheistic approaches posited nature as unconscious, which for Cudworth was ontologically unsupportable, as a principle that was supposed to be the ultimate source of life and meaning could only be itself self-conscious and knowledgeable, that is, rational, otherwise creation or nature degenerates into inert matter set in motion by random external forces (Coleridge's 'chance whirlings of unproductive particles'). Cudworth saw nature as a vegetative power endowed with plastic (forming) and spermatic (generative) forces, but one with Mind, or a self-conscious knowledge. This idea would later emerge in the Romantic period in German science as Blumenbach's Bildungstreib (generative power) and the Lebenskraft (or Bildungskraft). Guido Giglioni writes:

... the life of the universe splits into two principles – the one transcendent and intellectual (« an animalish, sentient and intellectual nature, or a conscious soul and mind, that presided over the whole world »), the other immanent and devoid of perception (« a certain plastic nature, or spermatic principle which was properly the fate of all things »)

The essence of atheism for Cudworth was the view that matter was self-active and self-sufficient, whereas for Cudworth the plastic power was unsentient and under the direct control of the universal Mind or Logos. For him atheism, whether mechanical or material could not solve the "phenomenon of nature." Henry More argued that atheism made each substance independent and self-acting such that it 'deified' matter. Cudworth argued that materialism/mechanism reduced "substance to a corporeal entity, its activity to causal determinism, and each single thing to fleeting appearances in a system dominated by material necessity."

Cudworth had the idea of a general plastic nature of the world, containing natural laws to keep all of nature, inert and vital in orderly motion, and particular plastic natures in particular entities, which serve as 'Inward Principles' of growth and motion, but ascribes it to the Platonic tradition:

The Platonists seem to affirm both these together, namely that there is a Plastick Nature lodged in all particular Souls of Animals, Brutes, and Men, and also that there is a Plastick or Spermatick Principle of the whole Universe distinct from the Higher Mundane Soul, though subordinate to it. (Cudworth, TIS, p. 165)

Further, Cudsworth's plastic principle was also a functional polarity. As he wrote:

The Seminary Reason or Plastick Nature of the Universe opposing the Parts to one another and making them severally Indigent, produces by that means War and Contention. And therefore though it be One, yet notwithstanding it consists of Different and Contrary things. For there being Hostility in its Parts, it is nevertheless Friendly and Agreeable in the Whole; after the same manner as in a Dramatick Poem, Clashings and Contentions are reconciled into one Harmony. And therefore the Seminary or Plastick Nature of the World, may fitly be resembled to the Harmony of Disagreeing things.

As another historian notes in conclusion, "Cudworth's theory of plastic natures is offered as an alternative to the interpretation of all of nature as either governed by blind chance, or, on his understanding of the Malebranchean view, as micro-managed by God."

==== Plastic principle and mind ====
Cudworth's plastic principle also involves a theory of mind that is active, that is, God or the Supreme Mind is "the spermatic reason" which gives rise to individual mind and reason. Human mind can also create, and has access to spiritual or super-sensible 'Ideas' in the Platonic sense. Cudworth challenged Hobbesian determinism in arguing that will is not distinct from reason, but a power to act that is internal, and therefore, the voluntary will function involves self-determination, not external compulsion, though we have the power to act either in accordance with God's will or not. Cudworth's 'hegemonikon' (taken from Stoicism) is a function within the soul that combines the higher functions of the soul (voluntary will and reason) on the one hand with the lower animal functions (instinct), and also constitutes the whole person, thus bridging the Cartesian dualism of body and soul or psyche and soma. This idea provided the basis for a concept of self-awareness and identity of an individual that is self-directed and autonomous, an idea that anticipates John Locke.

=== Views on animals ===
Cudworth rejected René Descartes' animal machine doctrine, which held that animals are mere automata devoid of consciousness. In contrast to Descartes' strict dualism, which limited subjective experience to rational, immaterial human souls, Cudworth argued that animals possess a form of soul marked by internal self-activity and sensibility. He maintained that living beings are distinguished from inanimate matter not only by rationality but also by their capacity for autonomous motion and subjective states. Though based on metaphysical premises not widely held today, Cudworth's account provided a moral and philosophical contrast to mechanistic interpretations of animal life and denied that animals should be regarded as mindless or morally insignificant.

== Legacy ==
Locke examined how man came to knowledge via stimulus (rather than seeing ideas as inherent), which approach led to his idea of the 'thinking' mind, which is both receptive and pro-active. The first involves receiving sensations ('simple ideas') and the second by reflection – "observation of its own inner operations" (inner sense which leads to complex ideas), with the second activity acting upon the first. Thought is set in motion by outer stimuli which 'simple ideas' are taken up by the mind's self-activity, an "active power" such that the outer world can only be real-ized as action (natural cause) by the activity of consciousness. Locke also took the issue of life as lying not in substance but in the capacity of the self for consciousness, to be able to organize (associate) disparate events, that is to participate life by means of the sense experiences, which have the capacity to produce every kind of experience in consciousness. These ideas of Locke were taken over by Fichte and influenced German Romantic science and medicine. (See Romantic medicine and Brunonian system of medicine). Thomas Reid and his "Common Sense" philosophy, was also influenced by Cudworth, taking his influence into the Scottish Enlightenment.

George Berkeley later developed the idea of a plastic life principle with his idea of an 'aether' or 'aetherial medium' that causes 'vibrations' that animate all living beings. For Berkeley, it is the very nature of this medium that generates the 'attractions' of entities to each other.

The refraction of light is also thought to proceed from the different density and elastic force of this æthereal medium in different places. The vibrations of this medium, alternately concurring with or obstructing the motions of the rays of light, are supposed to produce the fits of easy reflection and transmission. Light by the vibrations of this medium is thought to communicate heat to bodies. Animal motion and sensation are also accounted for by the vibrating motions of this æthereal medium, propagated through the solid capillaments of the nerves. In a word, all the phenomena and properties of bodies that were before attributed to attraction, upon later thoughts seem ascribed to this æther, together with the various attractions themselves. (Berkeley V 107–8)

Berkeley meant this 'aether' to supplant Newton's gravity as the cause of motion (neither seeing the polarity involved between two forces, as Cudworth had in his plastic principle). However, in Berkeley's conception, aether is both the movement of spirit and the motion of nature.

Both Cudworth's views and those of Berkeley were taken up by Coleridge in his metaphor of the eolian harp in his 'Effusion XXXV' as one commentator noted: "what we see in the first manuscript is the articulation of Cudworth's principle of plastic nature, which is then transformed in the published version into a Berkeleyan expression of the causal agency of motion performed by God's immanent activity."

== Works ==
=== Sermons and treatises ===
Cudworth's works included The Union of Christ and the Church, in a Shadow (1642); A Sermon preached before the House of Commons (1647); and A Discourse concerning the True Notion of the Lord's Supper (1670). Much of Cudworth's work remains in manuscript. However, certain surviving works have been published posthumously, such as A Treatise concerning eternal and immutable Morality, and A Treatise of Freewill.

==== A Treatise concerning eternal and immutable Morality (posth.) ====
Cudworth's Treatise on eternal and immutable Morality, published with a preface by Edward Chandler (1731), is about the historical development of British moral philosophy. It answers, from the standpoint of Platonism, Hobbes's famous doctrine that moral distinctions are created by the state. It argues that just as knowledge contains a permanent intelligible element over and above the flux of sense-impressions, so there exist eternal and immutable ideas of morality.

==== A Treatise of Freewill (posth.) ====
Another posthumous publication was Cudworth's A Treatise of Freewill, edited by John Allen (1838). Both this and the Treatise on eternal and immutable Morality are connected with the design of his magnum opus, The True Intellectual System of the Universe.

=== The True Intellectual System of the Universe (1678) ===
In 1678, Cudworth published The True Intellectual System of the Universe: the first part, wherein all the reason and philosophy of atheism is confuted and its impossibility demonstrated, which had been given an Imprimatur for publication (29 May 1671).

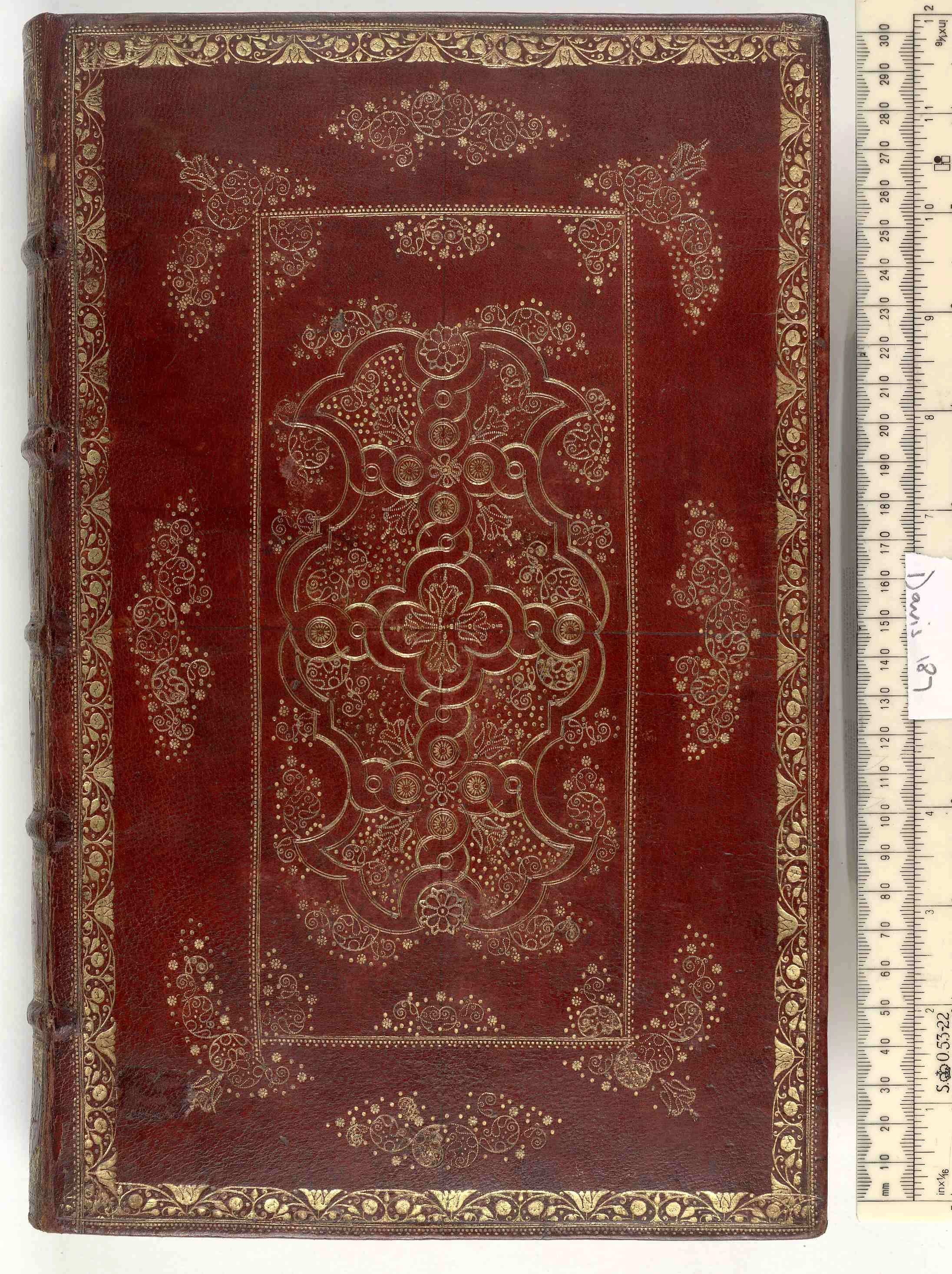
A finely-bound first edition of the True Intellectual System (1678) in the British Library (shelfmark: Davis 187).

The Intellectual System arose, according to Cudworth, from a discourse refuting "fatal necessity", or determinism. Enlarging his plan, he proposed to prove three matters:

1. the existence of God;
2. the naturalness of moral distinctions; and
3. the reality of human freedom.

These three comprise, collectively, the intellectual (as opposed to the physical) system of the universe; and they are opposed, respectively, by three false principles: atheism, religious fatalism (which refers all moral distinctions to the will of God), and the fatalism of the ancient Stoics (who recognized God and yet identified him with nature). Only the first part, dealing with atheism, was ever published.

Cudworth criticizes two main forms of materialistic atheism: the atomic (adopted by Democritus, Epicurus and Thomas Hobbes); and the hylozoic (attributed to Strato of Lampsacus, which explains everything by the supposition of an inward self-organizing life in matter). Atomic atheism, to which Cudworth devotes the larger part of the work, is described as arising from the combination of two principles, neither of which is, individually, atheistic (namely atomism and corporealism, or the doctrine that nothing exists but body). The example of Stoicism, Cudworth suggests, shows that corporealism may be theistic.

Cudworth discusses the history of atomism at length. It is, in its purely physical application, a theory that he fully accepts. He holds that theistic atomism was taught by Pythagoras, Empedocles and many other ancient philosophers, and was only perverted to atheism by Democritus. Cudworth believes that atomism was first invented before the Trojan War by a Sidonian thinker named Moschus or Mochus (whom he identifies with Moses in the Old Testament).

Cudworth's method in arranging his work was to marshal the atheistic arguments elaborately before refuting them in his final chapter. This led many readers to accuse Cudworth himself of atheism – as John Dryden remarked, "he has raised such objections against the being of a God and Providence that many think he has not answered them". Much attention was also attached to a subordinate matter in the book, the conception of the "Plastic Medium" (a revival of Plato's "World-Soul") which was intended to explain the existence and laws of nature without referring to the direct operation of God. This theory occasioned a long-drawn controversy between Pierre Bayle and Georges-Louis Leclerc, with the former maintaining, and the latter denying, that the Plastic Medium is favourable to atheism.

Summing up the work, Andrew Dickson White wrote in 1896:

To this day he [Cudworth] remains, in breadth of scholarship, in strength of thought, in tolerance, and in honesty, one of the greatest glories of the English Church ... He purposed to build a fortress which should protect Christianity against all dangerous theories of the universe, ancient or modern ... While genius marked every part of it, features appeared which gave the rigidly orthodox serious misgivings. From the old theories of direct personal action on the universe by the Almighty he broke utterly. He dwelt on the action of law, rejected the continuous exercise of miraculous intervention, pointed out the fact that in the natural world there are "errors" and "bungles" and argued vigorously in favor of the origin and maintenance of the universe as a slow and gradual development of Nature in obedience to an inward principle.

== Arms ==
Coat of arms of Ralph Cudworth

Notes
The arms of the Cudworths of Werneth, Oldham, Lancashire (with a crescent charged upon a crescent for the second son of a second son).
Escutcheon
Azure, a fess Erminois between three demi-lions Or, with a crescent Argent charged with a crescent Sable for difference.

== Sources ==
Academic offices
| Preceded by Robert Metcalfe | 11th Regius Professor of Hebrew, University of Cambridge; 1645–1688 | Succeeded by Wolfram Stubbe |
| Preceded by Thomas Paske vacancy from 1645 | 26th Master of Clare Hall, Cambridge; 1650–1654 | Succeeded by Theophilus Dillingham |
| Preceded by Samuel Bolton | 14th Master of Christ's College, Cambridge; 1654–1688 | Succeeded by John Covel |
