= Theophilus Dillingham =

English academic; (1613–1678)

Theophilus Dillingham (1613–1678) was an English churchman and academic, Master of Clare Hall, Cambridge and Archdeacon of Bedford.

== Life ==
The son of Thomas Dillingham, and nephew of Francis Dillingham, he was born at Over Dean, Bedfordshire. He was admitted a pensioner of Emmanuel College, Cambridge, 13 September 1629, and graduated B.A. in 1633, M.A. in 1637. He was elected a fellow of Sidney Sussex College in 1638, and subsequently took the degree of D.D.

In 1654 he was chosen Master of Clare Hall, and he was three time vice-chancellor of the University of Cambridge, in 1655, 1656, and part of 1661. At the Restoration he was ejected from the mastership, and Thomas Paske, one of his predecessors, was readmitted, but as Dillingham had married a daughter of Paske (Elizabeth), the latter resigned in favour of his son-in-law, who was re-elected by the fellows in 1661. On 29 January 1662 Dillingham became prebendary of Ulskelf in York Cathedral on Paske's resignation of the position, and on 3 September 1667 he was installed as archdeacon of Bedford. He also held the rectory of Offord Cluny, Huntingdonshire. He died at Cambridge on 22 November 1678, and was buried in St. Edward's Church.

== Notes ==
Academic offices
Preceded by Ralph Cudworth	Master of Clare College, Cambridge; 1654–1660	Succeeded by Thomas Paske
Preceded by Thomas Paske	Master of Clare College, Cambridge; 1661–1678	Succeeded by Samuel Blythe
