= Thomas Wakefeld =

English academic (died 1575)

Thomas Wakefeld (or Wakefield) (died 1575) was an English academic, the first Regius Professor of Hebrew at Cambridge University.

== Life ==
He was born at Pontefract, Yorkshire. He was educated at the University of Cambridge, graduating B.A. in 1523. On 9 November 1540, by then M.A., he was appointed by King Henry VIII to the newly established professorship of Hebrew at Cambridge. This carried with it membership of Trinity College.

Between 1549 and 1553, and again between 1569 and 1575, the office of reading the Hebrew lecture was discharged by others. It is likely that Wakefeld was disqualified due to alleged Roman Catholic sympathies.

He died in 1575, and was buried on 24 April at Chesterton, near Cambridge.

== Works ==
His Locutiones seu Phrases in Novo Testamento, quae videntur secundum proprietates linguae Hebraeae remained in manuscript.

== Family ==
Wakefield's brother Robert Wakefeld was also a scholar of language, and it has been suggested that John Wakefeld, gentleman, controller of the household of Archbishop Thomas Cranmer was his brother as well. Another 'Thomas Wakefeld' was servant to Cranmer in 1537. Wakefeld was twice married: first at the age of forty. He had nine children, three sons and six daughters.
