= Robert P. Gordon =

British scholar (born 1945)

- Born: 9 November 1945 (age 80); Belfast
- Education: St Catharine's College, Cambridge
- Scientific career
- Thesis: A study of Targum Jonathan to the Minor Prophets from Nahum to Malachi (1973)
- Doctoral advisor: John Emerton
- Website: www.robertpgordon.co.uk

Robert Patterson Gordon (born 9 November 1945) is a British scholar who was the Regius Professor of Hebrew at the University of Cambridge from 1995 to 2012.

== Early life ==
Gordon was born in Belfast, Northern Ireland. He studied at Methodist College Belfast and at St Catharine's College, Cambridge, where, as an undergraduate, Gordon placed in the first class of the Oriental Studies Tripos. In 1973 he earned a PhD at the University of Cambridge with a thesis entitled A Study of Targum Jonathan to the Minor Prophets from Nahum to Malachi, under the supervision of Professor J.A. Emerton. In 2001 he was awarded the University of Cambridge’s Litt.D.

== Career ==
While pursuing doctoral studies, Gordon was appointed Assistant Lecturer in Hebrew and Semitic Languages at the University of Glasgow. Teaching Ancient Near Eastern History at Glasgow had a formative influence on Gordon’s subsequent research on the Old Testament. He returned to Cambridge as a Lecturer in Old Testament and Intertestamental Studies in the Faculty of Divinity in 1979. Upon his election as the Regius Professor of Hebrew in 1995, a post he held until his retirement in 2012, Gordon moved to the Faculty of Oriental Studies (now the Faculty of Asian and Middle Eastern Studies). He is an Emeritus Fellow of St Catharine’s College, Cambridge.

Gordon served on advisory committees for various major Bible translations, including the Revised English Bible, New International Version, English Standard Version, and Antioch Bible.

Identified generally as an Old Testament scholar, Gordon's writing addressed issues presented by the various Old Testaments. These are the Aramaic- (Targums), Greek- (Septuagint), and Syriac-language (Peshitta) traditions that serve as conduits of the text and interpretation of the Hebrew Bible/Old Testament. Other Gordon’s works addressed the biblical text of the Old and New Testaments directly.

Gordon is a member of the British Society for Old Testament Study and served as the Society's president in 2003. He is a member of the editorial board of Vetus Testamentum, and served as the journal's Book List editor from 1998 to 2009. He was the secretary of the International Organization for the Study of the Old Testament from 2001 to 2004.

== Works ==
Gordon’s major authored or edited works include:

- 1 and 2 Samuel (OT Guides; Sheffield)
- 1 and 2 Samuel: A Commentary (Exeter; repr. Grand Rapids, 2004)
- The Targum of the Minor Prophets (The Aramaic Bible 14; Wilmington; with K.J. Cathcart)
- Studies in the Targum to the Twelve Prophets: From Nahum to Malachi (SVT 51; Leiden)
- The Place Is Too Small For Us: The Israelite Prophets in Recent Scholarship (ed.; Winona Lake)
- Wisdom in Ancient Israel (Fs J.A. Emerton; ed. w. J. Day, Hugh G. M. Williamson; Cambridge)
- The Old Testament in Syriac according to the Peshitta Version, IV, 2: Chronicles (The Peshitta Institute, Leiden)
- Holy Land, Holy City: Sacred Geography
- Interpretation of the Bible (Didsbury Lectures 2001; Carlisle)
- The Old Testament in its World: Papers Read at the Winter Meeting, January 2003, The Society for Old Testament Study, and at the Joint Meeting, July 2003,
- The Society for Old Testament Study and Het Oudtestamentisch Werkgezelschap in Nederland en België (OS 52; ed. w. J.C. de Moor; Leiden)
- Hebrew Bible and Ancient Versions: Selected Essays of Robert P. Gordon (Aldershot)
- The God of Israel (ed.; Cambridge); Hebrews. A Commentary (2nd edn; Sheffield Phoenix Press, Sheffield)
- Thus Speaks Ishtar of Arbela’: Prophecy in Israel, Assyria, and Egypt in the Neo-Assyrian Period (ed. w. H.M. Barstad; Winona Lake)
- Leshon Limmudim: Essays on the Language and Literature of the Hebrew Bible in Honour of A. A. Macintosh (ed. w. D.A. Baer; LHBOTS 593; London)
- Syriac Peshitta Bible with English Translation. Chronicles/English translation by Robert P. Gordon (Gorgias, Piscataway).

== Personal life ==
Gordon married Helen Ruth Lyttle in Belfast in 1970. They raised three children.

Academic offices
Preceded by John Emerton	Regius Professor of Hebrew, Cambridge; 1995–2012	Succeeded by Geoffrey Khan
