= Albin van Hoonacker =

Belgian priest, theologian, professor (1857–1933)

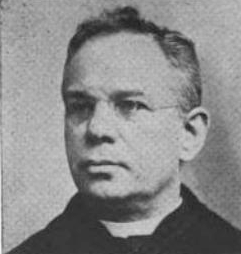
- Born: Albin-Augustin Van Hoonacker; 19 November 1857; Bruges, Belgium
- Died: 1 November 1933 (aged 75); Bruges, Belgium
- Education: Catholic University of Leuven
- Occupations: Theologian, educator

Albin-Augustin Van Hoonacker (19 November 1857 – 1 November 1933) was a Roman Catholic theologian, professor at the Faculty of Theology, Catholic University of Leuven, a member of The Royal Academy of Belgium and Knight of the Order of Leopold.

== Life ==
Albin van Hoonacker was born in Bruges, to a respectable middle-class family. They were religious Catholics; his two sisters became nuns and two of his brothers, like him, entered the priesthood. After primary school, Van Hoonacker attended his secondary education at the seminary in Roulers, where he mastered Greek and Latin. Thereafter, he entered the seminary of the diocese of Bruges. After his ordination as a priest in 1880, the Bishop of Bruges, Mgr Faict sent him to the Catholic University of Leuven, to continue his theological studies. In 1886, he obtained the doctorate in theology there, for his dissertation on the subject of the Creation.

After a short period of pastoral activity at Kortrijk Van Hoonacker returned to Leuven, where he worked as sub-regent at the Holy Spirit College. At the same time, Van Hoonacker deepened his knowledge of Orientalism, through attending university courses in Semitic languages (Hebrew, Syriac and Arabic). In July 1889, Van Hoonacker was invited by the redaction of Journal de Bruxelles, a Catholic newspaper to react upon some writings in the field of orientalism and biblical exegesis by the jurist, journalist and socialist senator Edmond Picard on the historical value of the Bible. As a result of his involvement in this polemic, Van Hoonacker earned great respect in Belgian Catholic circles, to the extent that Mgr. Abbeloos, then rector of the Catholic University of Leuven, and a biblical scholar himself, proposed to the Belgian bishops that Van Hoonacker be appointed to the newly created chair of Histoire critique de l'Ancien Testament. At a time when the historical-critical exploration of the Bible among Catholics was still highly controversial, Van Hoonacker thus became the first professor to teach the Critical History of the Old Testament. He remained in that post until 1927. Up to that time there had only been a single lecture-course at the university on biblical exegesis, that given by Thomas Lamy.

From 1888 onwards he published many papers on the critical investigation of the Pentateuch and of the prophetic books of the Old Testament. In his teaching and research he made use of the results and methods developed by other European scholars including those inclined to modernism such as Alfred Loisy and Marie-Joseph Lagrange.

In 1899 he published his study Le sacerdoce lévitique dans la loi et dans l'histoire des Hébreux, which was critical of the positions of Graf and Wellhausen on the origin of the Hexateuch. He also crossed swords with Abraham Kuenen by putting forward a new hypothesis about the chronology of Nehemiah and Ezra.

When at the initiative of Pope Leo XIII the Pontifical Biblical Commission was set up to counter the new difficulties in biblical exegesis, Van Hoonacker was one of the first seven members appointed (18 September 1901). Although somewhat reluctant and sceptical about this appointment, he did engage himself. Van Hoonacker drafted various proposals for documents to be prepared by the Commission, especially concerning the question of the Mosaic authorship of the Pentateuch and the origins of Acts.

After the condemnation of modernism by Pope Pius X. in his encyclical Pascendi dominici gregis of 1907 and the excommunication of Alfred Loisy a year later, van Hoonacker also came under suspicion in Rome. He witnessed the criticism by the ecclesiastical authorities of the work of his pupil Henri Poels as well as the adverse reaction to the appointment of his colleague Paulin Ladeuze, as rector of the university in Louvain. These events led to his decision in 1909 to suppress the publication of his critical remarks on the book by Franz Egger the Bishop of Brixen, Absolute oder relative Wahrheit der heiligen Schrift? Dogmatisch-christliche Untersuchung einer neuen Theorie. His criticism was eventually published posthumously. Then in 1913 he was informed by Lagrange that his 1908 book Les douze petits prophètes traduits et commentés was to be placed on the Index. This did not take place, however, thanks to the intervention of the Archbishop of Mechelen, Cardinal Mercier.

On the outbreak of war in 1914 and the German occupation of Belgium, Van Hoonacker fled to Great-Britain, where he settled in Cambridge. In this era he established friendly relations with Baron von Hügel. While in England he was invited to give the 1914 Schweich Lectures, on the subject of the Elephantine colony. After the war he returned to Leuven, and carried on his work until retirement in 1927.

In 1920 he joined the Royal Flemish Academy, and increasingly showed his support for the Flemish movement. In 1922 he became one of the first professors in Belgium to offer a lecture course delivered in the Dutch language. It was also at this time that he wrote his pamphlet Over de vernederlandsing in het onderwijs. In 1927 he was given the Freedom of the City of Bruges. He continued publishing until his death there on 1 November 1933.

== Bibliography ==
=== Works ===
- De rerum creatione ex nihilo (Diss. Fac. Theol., Tl. 38), Louvain, van Linthout, 1886, 315 pages
- L'origine des quatre premiers chapitres du Deutéronome, Louvain, Lefever, 1887, 47 pages
- Observations critiques sur les récits concernant Bileam, Louvain, Leféver, 1888, 16 pages
- La critique biblique et l'apologétique, Louvain, Lefever, 1889, 26 pages
- Néhémie et Esdras. Nouvelle hypothèse sur la chronologie de l'époque de la Restauration juive, Louvain, Istas, 1890, 85 pages
- Zorobabel et le second temple. Étude sur la chronologie des six premiers chapitres du livre d'Esdras. Ghent & Leipzig, Engelcke, 1892, 91 pages
- Néhémie en l'an 20 d'Artaxerxès I. Esdras en l'an 7 d'Artaxerxès II. Réponse à un mémoire d'A. Kuenen, Ghent & Leipzig, Engelcke, 1892, 91 pages
- Le lieu du culte dans la législation rituelle des Hébreux, Ghent & Leipzig, Engelcke, 1894, 92 pages
- Nouvelles études sur la restauration juive après l'exil de Babylone, Paris, Leroux, 1896, 313 pages
- Le sacerdoce lévitique dans la loi et dans l'histoire des Hébreux, London, Williams & Norgate, 1899, 465 pages
- Les douze petits prophètes traduits et commentés. Paris, Gabalda, 1908, 759 pages
- Une communauté Judéo-Araméenne à Éléphantine, en Égypte, aux VIe et Ve siècles avant J.-C.(The Schweich lectures, 1914), London, 1915, 91 pages
- De jongste waarnemingen op het gebied der geschiedenis van het semietische alfabet, Ghent, Erasmus, 1921, 112 pages (in de series "Koninklijke Vlaamsche Academie")
- Grondbeginselen der moraalfilosofie, Leuven, 1922, 192 pages
- Een Israëltisch volksman uit de achtste eeuw vóór C. Ghent, 1931, 170 pages, (in the series "Koninklijke Vlaamsche Academie")
- Het boek Isias vertaald uit het hebreeuwsch en in doorlopende aanteekeningen verklaard. Brugge 1932, 311 pages

=== Posthumous publications ===
- Quelques notes sur Absolute und relative Wahrheit in der heiligen Schrift. Une contribution inédite du chanoine Albin van Hoonacker à la Question Biblique (1909), submitted by J. Coppens in EthLov. 18, 1941, 201–336;
- De compositione litteraria et de origine Mosaica hexateuchi disquisitio historico-critica. Een historisch-kritisch onderzoek van professor van Hoonacker naar het ontstaan van de Hexateuch op grond van verspreide nagelaten aantekeningen. edited with an introduction by J. Coppens, Acad. Royale de Belgique, Verhandelingen, Bd. XI, Brüssel, 1949;
- Le rapprochement entre le Deutéronome et Malachie,(1908), submitted by F. Neirynck, in EthLov. 59, 1983, 86–90.
