= Thomas Paske =

English clergyman and academic

Thomas Paske (died 1662) was an English clergyman and academic, deprived as a royalist.

== Life ==
He was perhaps son of William Paske, vicar of Hendon, Middlesex, and may have been born there, but the registers do not begin until 1653. William Paske left Hendon for the living of Ashdon, Essex, in 1611; he died before 15 February 1639–40. Thomas was a scholar of Clare Hall, Cambridge, and fellow between Christmas 1603 and 1612. He graduated B.A. in 1606, B.D. in 1613. He succeeded William in the vicarage of Hendon on 9 September 1611, and became chaplain to James, Marquess of Hamilton.

On 21 December 1621 he was elected master of Clare Hall, and was incorporated D.D. in 1621. In 1625 he succeeded Theophilus Aylmer (d. 1625) both as archdeacon of London, and in the living of Much or Great Hadham, Hertfordshire, to which Little Hadham was then attached. He was also vicar of St. Mary Magdalen, Bermondsey. His connections with Clare College at Cambridge allowed Paske to greatly influence the election of Charles I's favorite, George Villiers, Duke of Buckingham to the Chancellorship of his alma mater in 1626. The entire college voted for the duke's installment as chancellor. The election created national controversy as Buckingham was under articles of impeachment by Parliament for corruption and embezzlement of treasury funds.

Paske was presented to the prebend of Ulleskelf in York Cathedral on 10 November 1628, and to a stall at Canterbury about 15 December 1636. He took up his residence at Canterbury, and the fellows of Clare consequently petitioned for and obtained from Charles I, some time before 2 September 1640, permission to elect a successor; but no appointment was made until 1645, when Ralph Cudworth was put in by Parliament.

Paske was also subdean of Canterbury, and on 30 August 1642 complained to Henry, Earl of Holland, of the ruthless treatment of the cathedral by troopers of Colonel Edwin Sandys's regiment. In the absence of the dean, he had been ordered by the parliamentary commander, Sir Michael Lindsey, to deliver up the keys. This communication to Lord Holland was published as The Copy of a Letter sent to an Honourable Lord, by Dr. Paske, Subdeane of Canterbury, London, 9 September 1642.

Paske, after being deprived of all his benefices, at the Restoration was reinstated in the rectory of Hadham, in his two prebends, and in the mastership of Clare Hall; but he surrendered his right of restitution to the latter in favour of his son-in-law, Theophilus Dillingham who succeeded Ralph Cudworth in 1664. Paske also resigned the York prebend in favour of Dillingham in 1661. On 24 June 1661 he attended in the lower house of Convocation but in December, probably from illness, he subscribed by proxy. He died before September 1662.

Thomas Paske of Hadham, apparently a grandson, was admitted to Clare Hall on 1 July 1692, was fellow and LL.D. of Clare, and represented the university of Cambridge in parliament from 1713 until his death in 1720.

Academic offices
Preceded by Robert Scott	Master of Clare College, Cambridge; 1620–1645	Succeeded by Ralph Cudworth
Preceded by Theophilus Dillingham	Master of Clare College, Cambridge; 1660–1661	Succeeded by Theophilus Dillingham
Preceded by Jerome Beale	Vice-Chancellor of the University of Cambridge; 1623–1624	Succeeded by John Mansell
