= Robert Scott (master of Clare) =

English churchman and academic

Robert Scott (c. 1569 – 1620) was an English churchman and academic, Master of Clare College, Cambridge and Dean of Rochester.

== Life ==
He was baptized in 1569 at Barnston, Essex, and matriculated as sizar at Pembroke College, Cambridge in 1588. He graduated B.A. in 1592, and M.A. from Clare College in 1595.

He reportedly had been a Fellow of Trinity College, Cambridge. He was sub-almoner to King James at the time of his election in 1612 as Master of Clare. He proceeded D.D. in 1613.

In 1615 he was appointed Dean of Rochester, and he served as Vice-Chancellor of Cambridge for 1619-20 . He died in London, on 21 December 1620 and was buried at Barnston.

Academic offices
Preceded by William Smith	Master of Clare College, Cambridge; 1612–1620	Succeeded by Thomas Paske
Preceded by John Gostlyn	Vice-Chancellor of the University of Cambridge; 1619–1620	Succeeded by Samuel Ward
