= Andrew Bing =

English scholar (1574–1652)

Andrew Bing (1574–1652) was an English scholar. He was a fellow of Peterhouse, Cambridge, and succeeded Geoffrey King as Regius Professor of Hebrew at Cambridge. He served on the "First Cambridge Company" charged by James I of England with translating parts of the Old Testament for the King James Version of the Bible.

Bing served as subdean of York Minster in 1606 and Archdeacon of Norwich in 1618.
