= Philip Bouquett =

Philip Bouquett or Bouquet (1669–1748) was a French linguist who became Regius Professor of Hebrew at the University of Cambridge.

== Life ==
Bouquett was from La Rochelle, Aunis, in France and sent as a refugee to be educated at Westminster School. He was elected in 1689 to a scholarship at Trinity College, Cambridge. He became B.A. 1692, M A. 1696, B.D. 1706, D.D. 1711. He was ordained in the Church of England in 1703.

When a vacancy occurred in the professorship of Hebrew in 1704, which it was thought desirable to confer on Henry Sike, Bouquett was temporarily appointed to it in the absence of Sike, a better-known orientalist. Sike was elected in August 1705, but on the professorship falling vacant again seven years later, Bouquett was elected to fill it permanently. He died senior fellow of Trinity on 12 February 1748, aged 79. As a Fellow of Trinity he refused to sign the petition against Richard Bentley; he was considered eccentric if rich. Bouquett contributed a copy of elegiacs to the university collection of poems on the death of George I and accession of George II in 1727. He left money to French refugees.
