= D. Winton Thomas =

British professor of Hebrew (1901–1970)

- Born: David Winton Thomas; 26 January 1901
- Died: 18 June 1970 (aged 69)

Academic background
- Education: St John's College, Oxford
- Influences: G. R. Driver

Academic work
- Discipline: Hebrew
- Institutions: University of Cambridge

David Winton Thomas (26 January 1901 – 18 June 1970) was a British scholar of Hebrew. He was Regius Professor of Hebrew at the University of Cambridge from 1938 to 1968. He was one of the first pupils of Godfrey Rolles Driver. He also played rugby for Wales.

== See also ==
- Biblia Hebraica Stuttgartensia

== Selected works ==
- Thomas D. Winston, Archaeology and Old Testament Study (1967)
- Thomas, D. Winton; McHardy, W. D., eds. (1963). Hebrew and Semitic Studies: Essays Presented to G. R. Driver. Oxford: Oxford University Press. ISBN 978-0198154273.
- Thomas D. Winston, Documents from Old Testament Times (1958)
- Thomas D. Winston, Wisdom in Israel and in the Ancient Near East presented to Professor Harold Henry Rowley, Supplements to Vetus Testamentum III (1955)

You can find a complete bibliography of David Windon Thomas in:+ Peter R. Ackroyd and Barnabas Lindars (Ed.), Words dans Meanings / Essays presented to David Winton Thomas on his retirement frome the Regius Professorship of Hebrew in the University of Cambridge, 1968, Cambridge University Press, 1968, pp. 217–228.

Academic offices
Preceded by Stanley Arthur Cook	Regius Professor of Hebrew at the University of Cambridge; 1938–1968	Succeeded by John Emerton
