= John Emerton =

British Anglican priest and theologian (1928–2015)

The Reverend Professor John Emerton FBA
- Born: John Adney Emerton; 5 June 1928
- Died: 12 September 2015 (aged 87)

Academic background
- Education: Corpus Christi College, Oxford; Wycliffe Hall, Oxford; St John's College, Cambridge

Academic work
- Institutions: University of Birmingham; University of Durham; University of Cambridge; University of Oxford; St Peter's College, Oxford; St John's College, Cambridge
- Doctoral students: Robert Gordon

John Adney Emerton, FBA (5 June 1928 – 12 September 2015) was a British Anglican priest, theologian, and academic. He was Regius Professor of Hebrew at the University of Cambridge from 1968 to 1995.

== Early life and education ==
Emerton was born on 5 June 1928. He studied theology at Corpus Christi College, Oxford, and graduated from the University of Oxford with a first class Bachelor of Arts (BA) degree in 1950. From 1950 to 1952, he trained for ordination at Wycliffe Hall, Oxford. His BA was promoted to a Master of Arts (MA (Oxon)) degree in 1954. The following year, in 1955, the University of Cambridge also granted him MA status.

Emerton continued his studies during his academic career. In 1960, he completed a Bachelor of Divinity (BD) degree at Corpus Christi College, Cambridge. In 1973, he was awarded a Doctor of Divinity (DD) degree by St John's College, Cambridge.

== Ordained ministry ==
Emerton was ordained in the Church of England as a deacon in 1952 and as a priest in 1953. From 1952 to 1953, he served his curacy at St Philip's Cathedral, Birmingham. He then spent the rest of his career in academia rather than in parish ministry. He was appointed an honorary canon of St George's Cathedral, Jerusalem in 1984.

== Academic career ==
He taught at the University of Birmingham and the University of Durham, and is a fellow of St Peter's College, Oxford and St John's College, Cambridge. He served as editor of Vetus Testamentum from 1976 to 1997, as President of the Society for Old Testament Study in 1979 and as President of the 15th congress of IOSOT in 1995.

== Later life ==
Emerton died on 12 September 2015. His funeral was held at St Mark's Church, Newnham, Cambridge on 6 October 2015. A memorial service was also held at St John's College, Cambridge.

== Honours ==
In 1991, Emerton was awarded the Burkitt Medal by the British Academy. In 2010, a Festschrift was published in his honour. Genesis, Isaiah, and Psalms: A Festschrift to Honour Professor John Emerton for His Eightieth Birthday included contributions from Patrick D. Miller and Rudolf Smend.

== Articles ==
- 'Did Jesus Speak Hebrew?' The Journal of Theological Studies, New Series, Vol. 12, No. 2 (October 1961), pp. 189–202

Academic offices
Preceded by David Winton Thomas	Regius Professor of Hebrew; University of Cambridge; 1968 to 1995	Succeeded by Robert Gordon
