= Nicholas Hookes =

English poet

Nicholas Hookes (1632–1712) was an English poet, best known for Amanda, a sacrifice to an unknown goddesse.

== Life ==
Hookes was born in London and was educated at Westminster School under Richard Busby. He gained a scholarship at Trinity College, Cambridge in 1649, and graduated B.A. there in 1653. His tutor was Alexander Akehurst. Akehurst was expelled from Trinity the following year, for "blasphemous statements", and accused by his student Oliver Heywood of being a Quaker. Hookes wrote of him that he concealed his head "among the clouds of alchemists".

Hookes died on 7 November 1712; and was buried in St Mary-at-Lambeth. A monumental inscription there remembered him as loyal to the Stuarts.

== Works ==
The Amanda verses published by Hookes in 1653, his year of graduation, were generally in the Cavalier poet amatory style, conventional from a literary point of view but "overtly royalist" in terms of politics under the Commonwealth of England. The book was dedicated to Edward Montagu, a Westminster and Cambridge contemporary and son of Edward Montagu, 2nd Baron Montagu of Boughton.

The same year Hookes published also Miscellanea poetica, mostly Latin verse in the elegy genre: this work sought patronage.
