= Geoffrey King (theologian) =

English theologian

Geoffrey King (sometimes spelled Geoffry) was an English Protestant theologian, a Fellow and Regius Professor of Hebrew at King's College, Cambridge. He was among the First Westminster Company charged by James I of England with the translation of the first 12 books of the King James Version of the Bible.
