= Mochus =

Early philosopher

Mochus (Ancient Greek: Μωχός), also known as Mochus of Sidon and Mochus the Phoenician, is listed by Diogenes Laërtius along with Zalmoxis the Thracian and Atlas of Mauretania, as a proto-philosopher. Athenaeus claimed that he authored a work on the history of Phoenicia. Strabo, on the authority of Posidonius, speaks of one Mochus or Moschus of Sidon as the author of the atomic theory and says that he was more ancient than the Trojan War. He is also referred to by Josephus, Tatian, Eusebius, and Damascius.

According to Robert Boyle, the father of modern chemistry, "‘Learned men attribute the devising of the atomical hypothesis to one Moschus a Phenician". Isaac Newton, Isaac Causabon, John Selden, Johannes Arcerius, Henry More, and Ralph Cudworth also credit Mochus of Sidon as the author of the atomic theory and some of them tried to identify Mochus with Moses the Israelite lawbringer.
