= Aaron Koller =

American scholar of Hebrew (born 1978)

Aaron J. Koller (born 1978 in Baltimore) is an American scholar of Hebrew and Semitic languages. He was a student of Professor Richard C. Steiner at Yeshiva University's Bernard Revel Graduate School of Jewish Studies, and later co-edited a volume in honor of Steiner. He also studied Near Eastern Studies at the University of Pennsylvania under Jeffrey H. Tigay and Barry L. Eichler; Arabic at Columbia University; and Egyptian hieroglyphs at the Brooklyn Museum. Lawrence Stager was on his dissertation committee. Koller began teaching at Yeshiva University in 2008, rising to become Professor of Near Eastern Studies. In April 2025, he was announced as the next Regius Professor of Hebrew at the University of Cambridge, England. He is the first Jewish person to hold the chair that was established by King Henry VIII.

While at Yeshiva University, Koller argued that traditional Jewish law needed to be flexible enough to accommodate the full acceptance of the LGBTQ+ community. His position was condemned by many senior rabbis in the institution but found support among many students. Yeshiva has adopted a policy of barring LGBTQ+ students from forming a student club. Since 2026, Koller is a member of the Editorial Board of the "European Hebrew Journal".

== Selected works ==
- Koller, Aaron J. (2012). The semantic field of cutting tools in biblical Hebrew: the interface of philological, semantic, and archaeological evidence. Catholic Biblical Quarterly Monograph Series. Vol. 49. Washington, DC: Catholic Biblical Association of America. ISBN 978-0915170487.
- Koller, Aaron J. (2014). Esther in ancient Jewish thought. New York: Cambridge University Press. ISBN 978-1107048355.
- Koller, Aaron J. (2020). Unbinding Isaac: the significance of the Akedah for modern Jewish thought. Philadelphia: The Jewish Publication Society. ISBN 978-0827614734.
