= R. H. Kennett =

Regius Professor of Hebrew

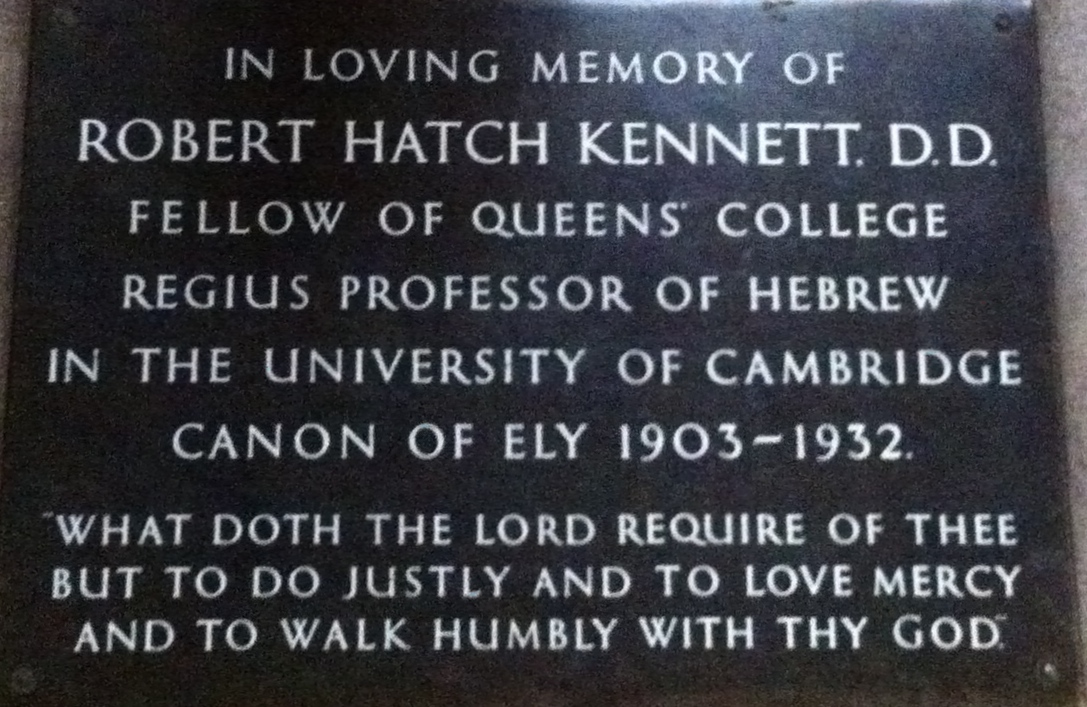
Memorial to Robert Hatch Kennett in Ely Cathedral

Robert Hatch Kennett (9 September 1864 – February 15, 1932) was Regius Professor of Hebrew at the University of Cambridge from 1903 to 1932.

Academic offices
Preceded by Alexander Kirkpatrick	Regius Professor of Hebrew, Cambridge; 1903–1932	Succeeded by Stanley Arthur Cook
