= Edward Lively =

English translator

Edward Lively (1545 – May 1605) was an English linguist and biblical scholar. He studied at Trinity College, Cambridge, where he became a Fellow, He was Regius Professor of Hebrew from 1575 to 1605. His published works include Latin expositions of some of the minor prophets, as well as a work on the chronology of monarchs of Persia.

He played an active role during the planning for the King James Version of the Bible, and his death from a peritonsillar abscess is said to have considerably delayed commencement of the work. He left eleven children to be cared for by his widow, with paltry income from his prebend at Peterborough and the generosity of his patron, William Barlow. [Note: McClure (p. 104) indicates Lively predeceased his wife, leaving eleven orphans.]
