= Andreas Höfele =

German literary scholar

Andreas Höfele (born in 1950) is a German English studies scholar and writer.

== Life and career ==
Andreas Höfele was born in 1950. From 1969 to 1974, he studied English studies, art history, German studies and theatre studies at Goethe University Frankfurt and LMU Munich. He was professor of theatre studies at LMU Munich from 1986 to 1992, professor of English studies at Heidelberg University from 1992 to 2000, and professor of English studies at LMU Munich from 2000 to his retirement in 2016.

His research has focused on early modern English literature and especially William Shakespeare. His 2011 book Stage, Stake, and Scaffold: Humans and Animals in Shakespeare's Theatre is about the relation between Shakespeare's plays, bloodsports and criminal punishment. The German reception and influence of Shakespeare are the subjects of his 2016 book No Hamlets: German Shakespeare from Nietzsche to Carl Schmitt. Höfele explores the relationship between literature and the works of the legal scholar and political philosopher Carl Schmitt in the 2022 book Carl Schmitt und die Literatur.

== Selected publications ==
- 2011: Stage, Stake, and Scaffold: Humans and Animals in Shakespeare's Theatre. Oxford: Oxford University Press
- 2016: No Hamlets: German Shakespeare from Nietzsche to Carl Schmitt. Oxford: Oxford University Press
- 2022: Carl Schmitt und die Literatur. Berlin: Duncker & Humblot
