= Stanley Arthur Cook =

Cambridge professor

Stanley Arthur Cook (12 April 1873 – 26 September 1949) was Regius Professor of Hebrew at the University of Cambridge from 1932 to 1938.

Cook was born in King's Lynn, the son of John Thomas Cook of Leicester. He was educated at Wyggeston Grammar School, Leicester, and read the Semitic Languages tripos at Gonville and Caius College, Cambridge, where he graduated with first-class honours in 1894 and won the Mason Hebrew Prize and Jeremie Septuagint Prize. Employed for several years on the editorial staff of Encyclopedia Biblica, in 1904 he was appointed a college lecturer (at Caius) in Hebrew, a position he maintained until his appointment as Regius Professor in 1932. He was also a university lecturer in comparative religion from 1912 to 1920 and joint editor of The Cambridge Ancient History.

Cook married Annette Bell, who predeceased him. He died in Cambridge on 26 September 1949.

== Select publications ==
- Critical Notes on Old Testament History: the Traditions of Saul and David (1907)
- The Religion of Ancient Palestine in the Second Millenium B.C. (1908)
- The Foundations of Religion (1914)
- The Study of Religions (1914)
- The Religion of Ancient Palestine in the Light of Archaeology (1930)
- Ethical Monotheism in the Light of Comparative Religion (1932)
- The Old Testament: a Reinterpretation (1936)
- The “Truth” of the Bible (1938)
- The Rebirth of Christianity (1942)
- An Introduction to the Bible (1945) (reprint 1950)

Academic offices
Preceded by R. H. Kennett	Regius Professor of Hebrew, Cambridge University; 1932–1938	Succeeded by David Winton Thomas
