= Regius Professor of Hebrew (Cambridge) =

Professorship of Hebrew in the University of Cambridge

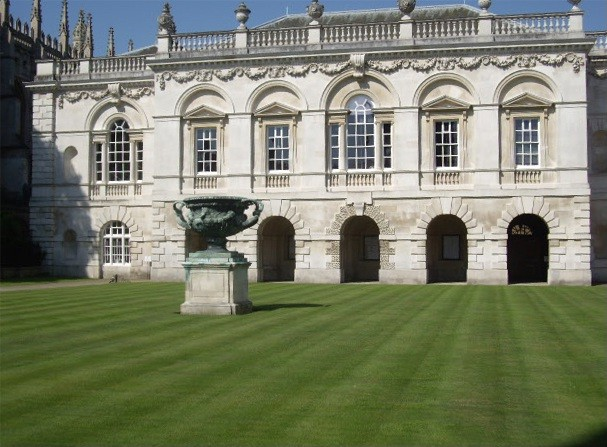
Senate House, University of Cambridge

The Regius Professorship of Hebrew in the University of Cambridge is an ancient academic chair at the University of Cambridge founded by King Henry VIII in 1540. The holder of the chair is the senior academic in Hebrew and Semitics at Cambridge. According to the Royal family, the title of Regius Professor is "a rare honour, designed to reflect an exceptionally high standard of teaching and research at an institution." Although some Regius Professors (Civil Law, Physic, and Modern History) are appointed by the Crown on the advice of the Prime Minister, this is no longer true for the Professor of Hebrew.

Among the holdings at Cambridge relevant to study of Hebrew are the Cairo Genizah, the Cambridge manuscript of the Mishnah, and hundreds of rare books and manuscripts in the University Library and the libraries of the various Colleges.

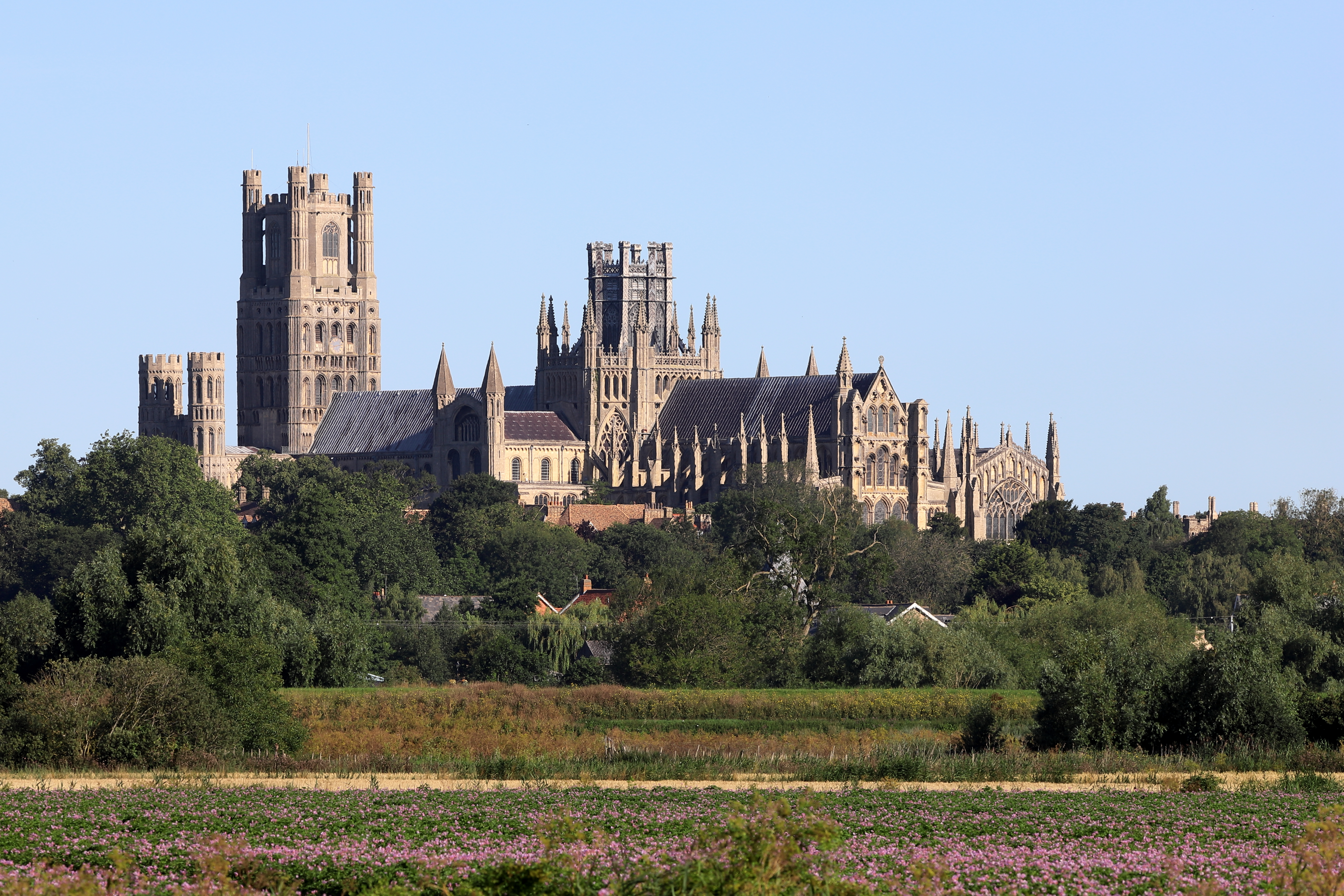
Ely Cathedral as seen from Quanea Drove F in the southwest

When created, the professorship carried a permanent stipend of £40 per year. In 1840 this was increased, with a canonry of Ely Cathedral being attached to the post in perpetuity. In the twenty-first century, however, the Regius Professor has not been in holy orders, and so the position is not associated with the Church.

== List of Regius Professors ==
The chair has been held by:

- 1540-1549 Thomas Wakefeld
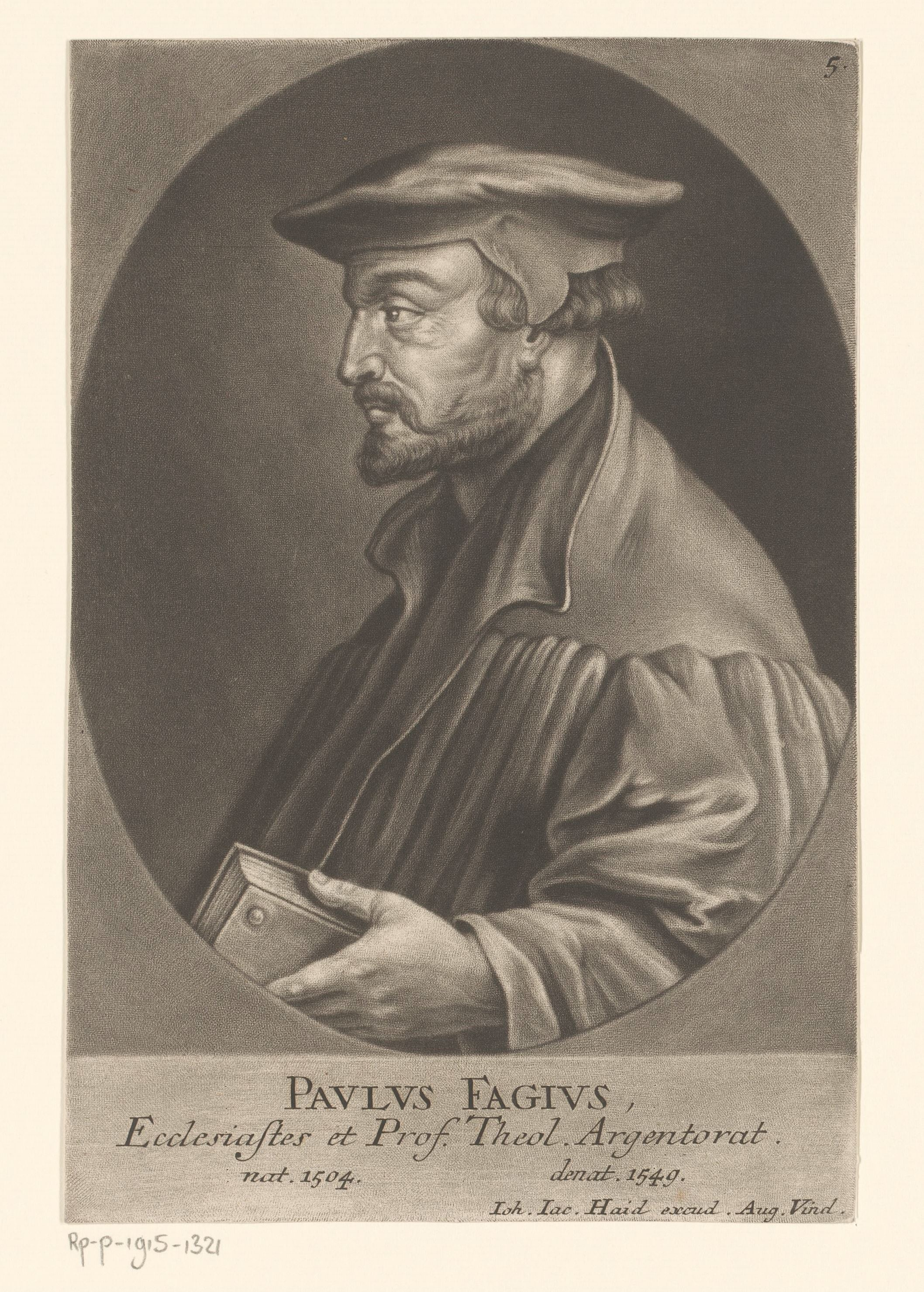
- Paul Fagius, Regius Professor briefly in 1549, until his death in the plague
  1549 Paul Fagius
- 1550-1553 Immanuel Tremellius
- 1569 Antoine Rudolphe Chevallier
- 1572 Philippe Bignon
- 1575 Edward Lively
- 1605 Robert Spaldinge
- 1607 Geoffrey Kynge
- 1608 Andrew Byng
- 1622 Robert Metcalfe
- 1645 Ralph Cudworth
- 1688 Wolfram Stubbe
- 1699 James Talbot
- 1705 Henry Sike
- 1712 Philip Bouquett
- 1748 Thomas Harrison
- 1753 Charles Torriano
- 1757 William Disney
- 1771 William Collier
- 1790 John Porter
- 1795 Henry Lloyd
- 1831 Samuel Lee
- 1848 William Hodge Mill
- 1854 Thomas Jarrett
- 1882 Alexander Francis Kirkpatrick
- 1903 Robert Hatch Kennett
- 1932 Stanley Arthur Cook
- 1938 David Winton Thomas
- 1968 John Adney Emerton
- 1995 Robert P. Gordon
- 2012 Geoffrey Khan
- 2025 Aaron Koller

== Official coat of arms ==
According to a grant of 1590, the office of Regius Professor of "Hebrew" at Cambridge has a coat of arms with the following blazon:

Coat of arms of Regius Professor of Hebrew
Crest On a wreath "silver and sables," a turtle-dove azure. Escutcheon Argent, the Hebrew letter ת (Tawe) sable, on a chief gules, a lion passant guardant or, charged on the side with the letter H sable.
