= Henry Knollys (privateer) =

English privateer, courtier, and politician

Member of Parliament for Reading
- In office 1562–1563 – 1571 Serving with Robert Rowbotham, John Hastings
- Preceded by: Thomas Aldworth; Thomas Turner
- Succeeded by: Robert Knollys; Francis Alford

Personal details
- Born: c. 1542
- Died: 21 December 1582 (aged 39–40)
- Spouse: Margaret Cave (m. 1549; died 1606)
- Children: Elizabeth, Lady Willoughby; Lettice Paget, Baroness Paget
- Parents: Francis Knollys (father); Catherine Carey (mother)
- Relatives: Lettice Knollys (sister); William Knollys (brother); Elizabeth Knollys (sister); Francis Knollys (brother); Anne Knollys (sister)
- Education: Magdelen College, Oxford

Sir Henry Knollys of Kingsbury, Warwickshire (ca. 1542 – 21 December 1582) was an English courtier, privateer and Member of Parliament.

== Early life ==
He was the eldest son of Sir Francis Knollys, Treasurer of the Royal Household, and Catherine Carey, Lady of the Bedchamber to Queen Elizabeth I.

He was reputedly educated at Magdelen College, Oxford.

== Career ==
He entered Parliament in 1562 as MP for Reading in Berkshire and was re-elected for Reading in 1571. He served against the Northern rebels in 1569 and by 1570 had been appointed Esquire of the Body to Queen Elizabeth I. In 1572, together with his father, he became MP for Oxfordshire.

Around 1578, he joined Sir Humphrey Gilbert in a venture designed to set up a new colony on the east coast of North America although Henry showed more interest in the more profitable business of privateering in the Spanish Caribbean. Gilbert gathered eleven heavily armed ships and a crew of 600, many of them convicted pirates especially pardoned for the voyage. Knollys soon refused to acknowledge Sir Humphrey's authority and, together with the pirate John Callis, took three ships (later joined by more) to the Spanish Coast on a privateering expedition. The planned voyage across the Atlantic never came to pass and Gilbert complained to Sir Francis Walsingham of Knolly's "unkind and ill dealing".

In 1582, an expedition to Portugal in support of Don Antonio, Prior of Crato, the Royal claimant to the throne, foundered when Henry was ordered to return home. He later joined his distant cousin John Norreys in the Netherlands to fight for Dutch independence but soon succumbed to wounds or disease.

== Personal life ==
On 16 July 1565, he married Margaret Cave (1559–1606), daughter and heiress of Sir Ambrose Cave, the Chancellor of the Duchy of Lancaster, and Margaret Willington. On the death of Sir Ambrose in 1568 he and his wife had inherited estates at Kingsbury, Warwickshire where they lived when in the Midlands. They had two daughters:

- Elizabeth Knollys (1579–1621), who married Sir Henry Willoughby, 1st Baronet, of Risley, Derbyshire.
- Lettice Knollys (c. 1583–1655), who married William Paget, 4th Baron Paget.

Sir Henry died on 21 December 1582.

== Ancestry ==
Ancestors of Henry Knollys (privateer)

16. Sir Richard Knollys
8. Robert Knollys
17. Margaret D'Oyley
4. Sir Robert Knollys
18. Sir John Troutbeck
9. Elizabeth Troutbeck
19. Margaret Hulse
2. Sir Francis Knollys
20. Sir Richard Penystone
10. Sir Thomas Penystone
21. Margaret Herris
5. Lettice Penystone
22. Richard Bulstrode
11. Alice Bulstrode
23. Alice Knyffe
1. Sir Henry Knollys
24. Sir William Carey
12. Sir Thomas Carey
25. Alice Furford
6. Sir William Carey
26. Sir Robert Spencer
13. Margaret Spencer
27. Eleanor Beaufort
3. Catherine Carey
28. William Boleyn
14. Thomas Boleyn, 1st Earl of Wiltshire
29. Lady Margaret Butler
7. Mary Boleyn
30. Thomas Howard, 2nd Duke of Norfolk
15. Lady Elizabeth Howard
31. Elizabeth Tilney
