= Francis West =

Deputy Governor of the Colony and Dominion of Virginia

Acting-Governor Francis West Esquire, Admiral of New England
- Born: October 28, 1586; Salisbury, Wiltshire, England
- Died: c. 1634 (aged 47–48); Colony of Virginia
- Occupation: merchant
- Spouse(s): Margaret Whitney; Temperance Flowerdew; Jane Davye
- Parent(s): Thomas West, 2nd Baron De La Warr; Anne Knollys

Member of the Virginia Governor's Council
- In office 1609–1633
- Preceded by: George Yeardley
- Succeeded by: John Pott

Deputy Governor of Virginia
- In office 1627 – 1628/9 (O.S./N.S.)

Francis West (b. 1586 – d. 1633/34) was a Deputy Governor of the Colony of Virginia.

== Early and family life ==
Born in Salisbury, Wiltshire on 28 October 1586, West was one of four sons of Thomas West, 2nd Baron De La Warr (1556–1602) of Wherwell Abbey in Hampshire and his wife, Anne Knollys who made their fortunes in the Virginia colony. His elder brother, Thomas West, 3rd Baron De La Warr (1577–1618), served as a governor of the Virginia Company of London from 1610–1611. His younger brother, John West (1590-ca 1659), served as Acting Governor of Virginia from 1635–1637. A fourth brother, Nathaniel West, died in Virginia in August 1623, aged 30.

== Career ==
Francis West was one of the distinguished passengers on Captain Christopher Newport's third voyage to Jamestown, Virginia, aboard the Mary and Margaret, which arrived in the summer of 1608. Newport returned to London with a load of iron ore sold to the East India Company. Francis West was selected to the Governor's Council in 1609, and remained such for the rest of his life, although he returned to England many times and the colony's private charter was superseded by a royal charter in 1624 (two years after attacks by native Americans killed many settlers). In November 1609, West used the ship Swallow to trade with the nearby Patawomeck people. During the incident, West and his crew killed several native people and took away corn and grain. Instead of returning to the suffering Jamestown, West and his crew set sail for England. On their journey home they met the supply mission of Francis's brother, Thomas West, in the Azores.

Francis West likely returned to Jamestown with his brother's supply flotilla. The colony had been suffering from lack of provisions, and the colonists elected West as their "President" (or Acting Governor) in the absence of Sir Thomas Gates or other high official of the London Company, although the following year they elected George Percy to that position. From 1612 to 1617 West was the Commandant of Jamestown. From July 30 through August 4, 1619, based on his position on the Governor's Council, West served in what would later become the upper house of the Virginia General Assembly, although he was not listed as one of the elected burgesses in Jamestown's first Legislative Assembly.

In 1622 Captain West was appointed Admiral to New England, where he served alongside Capt. Christopher Levett, Governor of Plymouth, on a three-man council under Capt. Robert Gorges, named Governor General of the Plymouth Council for New England's venture in Massachusetts. West subsequently served as Deputy Governor of Virginia from 17 November 1627 to 5 March 1629. He also served as Captain General of Virginia.

== Personal life ==
Coat of Arms of Francis West

West married three times. His first wife, Margaret Whitney, whom he married circa 16?5, was a three-time widow lastly married to Edward Blayney, and who died within two years. In March 1627 West remarried, to the widow of Governor George Yeardley, Temperance Flowerdew. She died in December of the same year, and West unsuccessfully litigated against the former Governor's orphaned children for possession of her estate. He married thirdly Jane Davye. He had one son, Francis West in 16??. In 1632, his estate was in Elizabeth City, south of the land of James Knott.

== Death and legacy ==
According to some records, he died in February 1633/1634, although this is not certain. However, two years later, fellow colonists "thrusting out" royal governor Governor Sir John Harvey selected his brother, John West, who had previously served as a burgess, as the temporary replacement.

== Ancestry ==
Ancestors of Francis West

Sir Thomas West, 8th Baron De La Warr
Sir George West
Eleanor Copley
William West, 1st Baron De La Warr
Sir Anthony (not Robert) Morton of Lechlade
Elizabeth Morton
Thomas West, 2nd Baron De La Warr
Thomas Strange of Chesterton
Lady Elizabeth Strange
Francis West
Robert Knollys
Sir Robert Knollys of Rotherfield Greys
Francis Knollys (the elder)
Thomas Peniston
Lettice Peniston
Alice Bulstrode
Anne Knollys
Thomas Cary (or Carey or Carye) of Chilton Foliat
Sir William Carey
Margaret Spencer
Catherine Carey
Sir Thomas Boleyn, 1st Earl of Wiltshire
Mary Boleyn
Elizabeth Howard

== Sources ==
- Nugent, Nell Marion; Cavaliers and Pioneers: Abstracts of Virginia Land Patents and Grants. Vol. 1. 1623–1666. Virginia State Library and Archives, Richmond, Virginia 1936
- Powhatan's Mantle: Indians in the Colonial Southeast by Peter H. Wood.

Government offices
Preceded by George Yeardley	Colonial Governor of Virginia; 1627–1629	Succeeded by John Pott
