= Richard Knollys (died 1596) =

Member of the Parliament of England

Richard Knollys (c. 1548–1596) was an English Member of Parliament.

== Life ==
He was the 5th son of Sir Francis Knollys and the brother of Edward, Francis, Robert, William and Henry Knollys, who were all MPs. He entered the Middle Temple in 1571.

He was a Member (MP) of the Parliament of England for Wallingford in 1584 and 1586, and for Northampton in 1589.

He married Joan, the daughter of John Heigham of Gifford, Suffolk and had 3 sons and 2 daughters. His second son, Robert, was also an MP.

== Ancestry ==
Ancestors of Richard Knollys (died 1596)

Sir Richard Knollys
Robert Knollys
Margaret D'Oyley
Sir Robert Knollys
Sir JohnTroutbeck
Elizabeth Troutbeck
Margaret Hulse
Sir Francis Knollys
Sir Richard Penystone
Sir Thomas Penystone
Margaret Herris
Lettice Penystone
Richard Bulstrode
Alice Bulstrode
Alice Knyffe
Richard Knollys
Sir William Carey
Sir Thomas Carey
Alice Furford
Sir William Carey
Sir Robert Spencer
Margaret Spencer
Eleanor Beaufort
Catherine Carey
William Boleyn
Thomas Boleyn, 1st Earl of Wiltshire
Lady Margaret Butler
Mary Boleyn
Thomas Howard, 2nd Duke of Norfolk
Lady Elizabeth Howard
Elizabeth Tilney
