= Robert Knollys (MP for Breconshire) =

English courtier and politician

Sir Robert Knollys KB (1547– 1619 or 1626) was an English courtier and politician who sat in the House of Commons at various times between 1572 and 1611.

== Life ==
Knollys was the son of Sir Francis Knollys, Treasurer of the Royal Household, and Catherine Carey, Lady of the Bedchamber to Queen Elizabeth I. He quickly entered the Queen's service. He grew up in Rotherfield Greys in Oxfordshire and Reading in Berkshire. In 1572, he was elected Member of Parliament for Reading. He was Keeper of Syon House and steward of Isleworth in 1577 and usher of Tower mint from 1577 to 1582. From about 1583, he was a J.P. for Breconshire. He was elected MP for Reading again in 1584 and 1586. In 1587 he became a gentleman of the privy chamber.

In 1589 Knollys was elected MP for Reading and Breconshire and chose to sit for Breconshire. He became Deputy Lieutenant in 1590 and Custos Rotulorum in about 1592. In 1593 he was re-elected MP for Breconshire. He was elected MP for Breconshire again in 1597 and 1601. By 1603, he was esquire of the body and in July 1603 was made a Knight of the Bath. He was re-elected MP for Breconshire in 1604. He enjoyed sports and played bowls with the Earl of Shrewsbury. He also took part in tilting competitions and was seriously injured in November 1602.

Knollys died in January 1619, after a fall at the house of his brother William at Caversham.

Knollys married Catherine Vaughan, daughter of Rowland Vaughan of Porthamel in Brecknockshire and had two daughters: Frances (sometimes erroneously called Catherine) who married Sir Charles Vaughan and Lettice who married Framlingham Gawdy, the High Sheriff of Norfolk. He was brother of Edward, Francis, Richard, William and Henry Knollys who were all MPs.

== Ancestry ==
Ancestors of Robert Knollys (MP for Breconshire)

Sir Richard Knollys
Robert Knollys
Margaret D'Oyley
Sir Robert Knollys
Sir JohnTroutbeck
Elizabeth Troutbeck
Margaret Hulse
Sir Francis Knollys
Sir Richard Penystone
Sir Thomas Penystone
Margaret Herris
Lettice Penystone
Richard Bulstrode
Alice Bulstrode
Alice Knyffe
Sir Robert Knollys
Sir William Carey
Sir Thomas Carey
Alice Furford
Sir William Carey
Sir Robert Spencer
Margaret Spencer
Eleanor Beaufort
Catherine Carey
William Boleyn
Thomas Boleyn, 1st Earl of Wiltshire
Lady Margaret Butler
Mary Boleyn
Thomas Howard, 2nd Duke of Norfolk
Lady Elizabeth Howard
Elizabeth Tilney

Parliament of England
Preceded by Henry Knollys; John Hastings	Member of Parliament for Reading; 1572–1586; With: Francis Alford 1572; Robert Harris 1584–1586	Succeeded by Thomas Egerton; Robert Harris
Preceded by Thomas Games	Member of Parliament for Breconshire; 1589–1611	Succeeded by Sir Charles Vaughan
