= Elizabeth Knollys =

English courtier

- Lady Leighton
- Portrait of Elizabeth Knollys by an unknown painter after George Gower, 1577
- Born: 15 June 1549; England
- Died: c. 1605 (aged about 56)
- Noble family: Knollys (by birth); Leighton (by marriage)
- Spouse: Sir Thomas Leighton
- Issue: Thomas Leighton; Elizabeth Talbot; Anne, Lady St John
- Father: Sir Francis Knollys
- Mother: Catherine Carey
- Occupation: Maid of Honour; Gentlewoman of the Privy Chamber

Elizabeth Knollys, Lady Leighton (15 June 1549 – c. 1605), was an English courtier who served Queen Elizabeth I of England, first as a Maid of Honour and secondly, after 1566, as a Gentlewoman of the Privy Chamber. Knollys was the grand-niece of Queen consort Anne Boleyn, which made her a cousin once removed of the Queen. Elizabeth married Sir Thomas Leighton of Feckenham in Worcestershire in 1578. He served as Governor of Jersey and Guernsey.

She is sometimes mistakenly referred to in documents as "Cecilia", which was the name of her youngest sister.

== Family and early years ==
Elizabeth Knollys was born on 15 June 1549, the second daughter and one of the 15 children of Sir Francis Knollys and Catherine Carey, the daughter of William Carey and Mary Boleyn. This made Elizabeth the grand-niece of Queen Anne Boleyn, second wife of Henry VIII. She had 11 surviving siblings, the eldest of whom, Lettice Knollys, would later be banished from court after secretly marrying Queen Elizabeth's favourite, Robert Dudley, 1st Earl of Leicester.

She was brought up in a staunchly Protestant household at Greys Court at Rotherfield Greys in Oxfordshire and Abbey House at Reading in Berkshire. In 1556, three years after the Catholic Princess Mary Tudor had become queen, Sir Francis Knollys and his wife were compelled to seek refuge in Frankfurt, Germany to escape the relentless Marian persecutions against known Protestants. It is not known if Elizabeth accompanied them as her parents took only five of their children abroad, leaving the others behind in England.

Knollys went to court as a Maid of Honour to Queen Elizabeth shortly after the latter ascended the English throne in 1558. Her mother was Chief Lady of the Bedchamber and her sister Lettice was a Maid of the Privy Chamber. Another sister, Anne would later join the royal court. On 5 January 1566, Elizabeth Knollys was appointed a Gentlewoman of the Privy Chamber receiving an annual salary of £33 6s 8d.

== Marriage ==
Elizabeth Knollys married Sir Thomas Leighton of Feckenham, Worcestershire, son of John Leighton of Wattlesborough in Shropshire and his wife, Joyce Sutton, in 1578. Leighton (who is sometimes called Layton) was a diplomat and soldier, and shared with her father the same strong Puritan beliefs. Following her marriage, Knollys, now styled Lady Leighton, continued to serve Queen Elizabeth in the same capacity as a Gentlewoman of the Privy Chamber, despite her sister Lettice's banishment from court. Her husband held the office of Governor of Jersey and Guernsey in the Channel Islands. Lady Leighton, however, did not spend much time on either island, much preferring life at court. Sir Walter Raleigh was her admirer, and had written her a poem.

An unknown artist after George Gower painted her portrait in 1577. It shows her with curled hair; she is wearing a black hat with a feather, and an elaborate, ornamented gown, which are likely indications that she did not share her husband's dour Puritan sympathies. Her black hat was displayed at the National Maritime Museum in an exhibition in 2003 which was curated by noted Tudor historian, David Starkey. Knollys had given Queen Elizabeth a similar black hat as a gift in 1578/9. In turn, Knollys is listed as having been the recipient of many New Year's presents from the Queen.

=== Issue ===
Together Lady Leighton and her husband had three children:

- Thomas (born 1584), married Mary Zouche.
- Elizabeth (died 12 January 1633), married Sherington Talbot, by whom she had issue.
- Anne (died July 1628 in childbirth), married Sir John St John, 1st Baronet, by whom she had 13 children in 14 years.

== Death ==
She died in 1605. On 10 June 1605, her £200 annuity was granted to Elizabeth Howard, Lady Carrick.

== Ancestry ==
Ancestors of Elizabeth Knollys

Sir Richard Knollys
Robert Knollys
Margaret D'Oyley
Sir Robert Knollys
Sir John Troutbeck
Elizabeth Troutbeck
Margaret Hulse
Sir Francis Knollys
Sir Richard Penystone
Sir Thomas Penystone
Margaret Herris
Lettice Penystone
Richard Bulstrode
Alice Bulstrode
Alice Knyffe
Elizabeth Knollys
Sir William Carey
Sir Thomas Carey
Alice Furford
William Carey
Sir Robert Spencer
Margaret Spencer
Eleanor Beaufort
Catherine Carey
William Boleyn
Thomas Boleyn, 1st Earl of Wiltshire
Lady Margaret Butler
Mary Boleyn
Thomas Howard, 2nd Duke of Norfolk
Lady Elizabeth Howard
Elizabeth Tilney

== In fiction ==
The character of Lady Penelope Knollys in the children's mystery novels, the Lady Grace Mysteries, is probably based on Lady Elizabeth Knollys. In the books, she is a maid of honour to Queen Elizabeth I and friend to the central character Lady Grace Cavendish. Her fictional father is given as Sir John Knollys and, in 1570, she marries Thomas Penn (rather than Thomas Leighton) at St George's Chapel, Windsor Castle. Penelope was the name of the real Lady Elizabeth's niece, the daughter of her brother, Sir Thomas Knollys, the Governor of Ostend.
