= Anne Knollys, Baroness De La Warr =

English courtier (1555–1608)

Anne West
- Baroness De La Warr
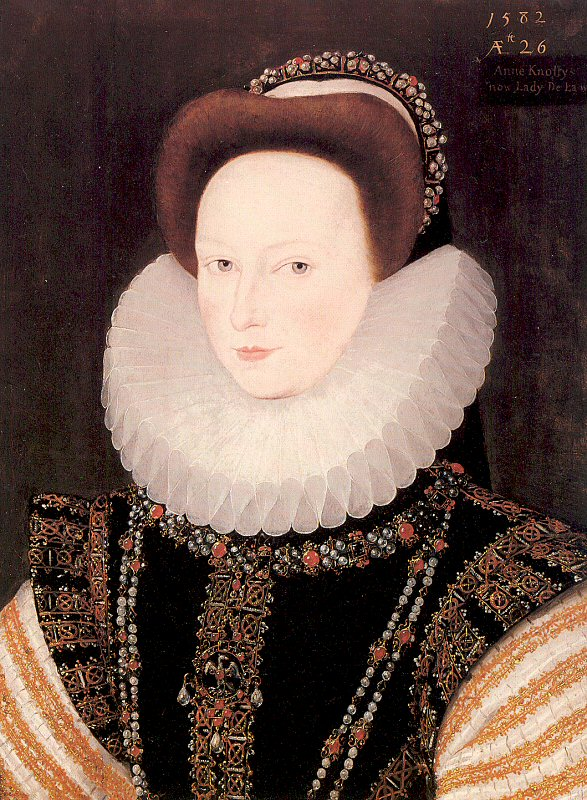
- Portrait of Anne West by Robert Peake, 1582
- Born: 19 July 1555 probably Rotherfield Greys, Oxfordshire or Reading, Berkshire
- Died: 30 August 1608 (aged 53); Lasham, Hampshire, England
- Noble family: Knollys
- Spouse: Thomas West, 2nd Baron De La Warr
- Issue: Sir Robert West; Thomas West, 3rd Baron De La Warr; Walsingham West; Francis West; John West; Nathaniel West; Elizabeth West; Lettice, Lady Ludlow; Anne West; Penelope, Lady Pelham; Katherine, Lady Strelby; Helen, Lady Savage; Anna West (again); Elisabeth, Lady Saltonstall
- Father: Sir Francis Knollys
- Mother: Catherine Carey

Anne West, Lady De La Warr (née Knollys) (19 July 1555 – 30 August 1608) was a lady at the court of Queen Elizabeth I of England.

== Biography ==
Anne Knollys was the third daughter of Sir Francis Knollys, Treasurer of the Royal Household (1514–1596) to Queen Elizabeth I, and his wife Lady Catherine Carey.

Her maternal grandparents were Sir William Carey and Mary Boleyn. Mary was a sister of Anne Boleyn, second wife of Henry VIII of England. Anne Knollys' mother was thus a first cousin of Queen Elizabeth, daughter of Anne Boleyn and Henry VIII. Mary Boleyn had preceded her more famous sister in the King's affections, and had affairs with both Francis I of France and Henry VIII. Both Catherine Carey and Henry Carey may have been Henry's children, though exact dates of birth are uncertain. If true, this would make Anne the granddaughter of Henry VIII.

Anne's eldest sister was Lettice Knollys, chief Lady of the Bedchamber to Queen Elizabeth and the mother of the queen's favourite, Robert Devereux, Earl of Essex.

As a lady in waiting or maid of honour at the court of Elizabeth I, Anne Knollys received several gifts of clothes in April and May 1570. These included cloth of silver to make a kirtle, satin for a French gown, a loose gown of black satin, and an embroidered taffeta hat.

== Marriage and issue ==
Anne Knollys married, on 19 November 1571, Thomas West, 2nd Baron De La Warr, by whom she had six sons and eight daughters:

- Sir Robert West, who married Elizabeth Coks and predeceased his father.
- Thomas West, 3rd Baron De La Warr (7 July 1577 – c. February 1624), who married Cecily Shirley, youngest daughter of Sir Thomas Shirley and Anne Kempe, daughter of Sir Thomas Kempe of Olantigh, Kent.
- Walsingham West.
- Francis West (28 October 1586 – c.1634), esquire, Governor of Virginia, who emigrated to Virginia, and married firstly, before 6 February 1626, Margaret, widow of Edward Blayney; secondly, on 31 March 1628, Temperance Flowerdew (d. December 1628), widow of Sir George Yeardley, Governor of Virginia, daughter of Anthony Flowerdew of Hethersett, Norfolk, by Martha Stanley; and thirdly in 1630, Jane Davye, by whom he had a son, Francis West.
- John West (14 December 1590 – 1659), Governor of Virginia, who emigrated to Virginia, and married a wife named Anne Percy, by whom he had a son, John West.
- Lieutenant Colonel Nathaniel West (30 November 1592 – 7 June 1618), who emigrated to Virginia, where in 1621 he married Frances Greville (d.1634), by whom he had a son, Nathaniel West. His widow married secondly Abraham Peirsey, esquire (d. 16 January 1628), and thirdly Captain Samuel Mathews, esquire (died c. March 1658).
- Elizabeth West (11 September 1573 – 15 January 1633), who married firstly at Wherwell, Hampshire, on 12 February 1594, as his second wife, Sir Herbert Pelham of Michelham (Bucksteep, Sussex, 1546 – Fordington, Dorset, 12 April 1620), Esquire, a widower with two sons and one daughter by his first wife, Katherine Thatcher (1550 - West Ham, Sussex, 1550 - Worcester, Worcestershire, 1593), by whom she had three sons and six daughters.
- Lettice West (born 1579), who married Henry Ludlow.
- Anne West (b. 13 February 1588), who married firstly, by licence dated 30 August 1608, John Pellatt (d. 22 October 1625), esquire, of Bolney, Sussex, by whom she had three daughters; secondly Christopher Swale (d. 7 September 1645), by whom she had a son, Christopher, and a daughter, Elizabeth; and thirdly Leonard Lechford (died c. 29 November 1673), by whom she had no issue.
- Penelope West (9 September 1582 – c.1619), who married, about 1599, as his first wife, Herbert Pelham (c.1580 – 13 July 1624)), esquire, of Hastings, Sussex, stepson of Penelope West's elder sister, Elizabeth, by whom she had five sons and four daughters.
- Katherine West (born 1583), who married Nickolas Strelby.
- Helen West (b. 15 December 1587), who married Sir William Savage of Winchester, Hampshire, by whom she had a son, John Savage, and two daughters, Cecily and Anne.
- Anne West (again).
- Elizabeth West (again), who married as his second wife Sir Richard Saltonstall of Huntwick Grange, near Nostell, Yorkshire.

=== Related material ===
The US state of Delaware is named after Anne's son, Thomas West, Baron De La Warre.

== Ancestry ==
Ancestors of Anne Knollys, Baroness De La Warr

Sir Richard Knollys
Robert Knollys
Margaret D'Oyley
Sir Robert Knollys
Sir John Troutbeck
Elizabeth Troutbeck
Margaret Hulse
Sir Francis Knollys
Sir Richard Penystone
Sir Thomas Penystone
Margaret Herris
Lettice Penystone
Richard Bulstrode
Alice Bulstrode
Alice Knyffe
Anne Knollys
Sir William Carey
Sir Thomas Carey
Alice Furford
William Carey
Sir Robert Spencer
Margaret Spencer
Eleanor Beaufort
Catherine Carey
William Boleyn
Thomas Boleyn, 1st Earl of Wiltshire
Lady Margaret Butler
Mary Boleyn
Thomas Howard, 2nd Duke of Norfolk
Lady Elizabeth Howard
Elizabeth Tilney
