= John Callis =

John Callis may refer to:

- John Callis (pirate), 16th-century Welsh pirate
- John Benton Callis, American businessman, soldier and politician
