= Robert Knollys (politician, died 1659) =

English politician

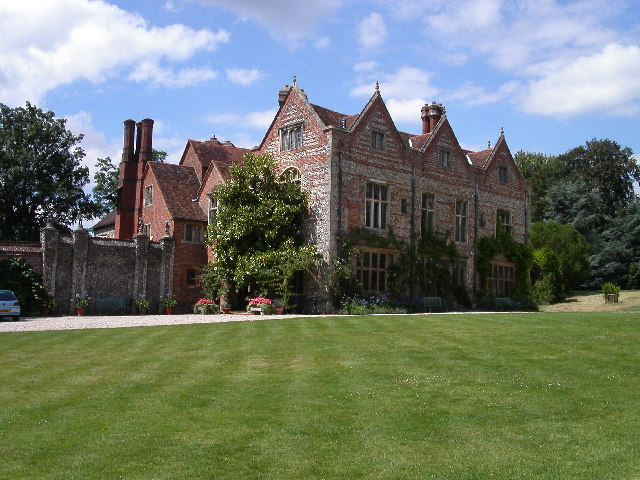
Greys Court, Oxfordshire

Sir Robert Knollys (1588–1659) was an English politician who sat in the House of Commons between 1614 and 1629. Knollys was the 2nd son of Richard Knollys of Stanford-in-the-Vale in Berkshire (now Oxfordshire). He matriculated at Oriel College, Oxford on 13 May 1603, aged 15. He was knighted on 12 January 1613.

In 1614, he was elected Member of Parliament for Abingdon. He was elected MP for Berkshire in 1621. In 1624 he was elected MP for Abingdon again, and was re-elected in 1625 and 1626. In 1628 he was elected MP for Wallingford and sat until 1629 when King Charles decided to rule without parliament for eleven years.

Knollys bought Greys Court from his uncle, William Knollys, Earl of Banbury, who died at the age of about 70 and was buried on 26 June 1659. Knollys also received a generous inheritance from another uncle, the Elizabethan soldier Captain Sir Thomas Higham

He married Joan, the daughter of Sir John Wolstenholme and left a son and several daughters; one child was Lettice Knollys or Laetitia Knowles, who married Sir John Corbet (1619–64), second of the Corbet baronets of Stoke.

Parliament of England
Preceded by Sir Richard Lovelace	Member of Parliament for Abingdon; 1614	Succeeded by Robert Hyde
Preceded by Sir Henry Neville; Sir Thomas Parry	Member of Parliament for Berkshire; 1621–1622; With: Sir Richard Lovelace	Succeeded by Edmund Dunch; Sir Richard Harrison
Preceded by Robert Hyde	Member of Parliament for Abingdon; 1624–1626	Succeeded by Sir John Stonhouse, 2nd Baronet
Preceded by Sir Anthony Forrest; Unton Croke	Member of Parliament for Wallingford; 1628–1629; With: Edmund Dunch	Parliament suspended until 1640
