= SS Lord Delaware =

Liberty ship of WWII

History

United States
- Name: Lord Delaware
- Namesake: Lord Delaware
- Owner: War Shipping Administration (WSA)
- Operator: Agwilines Inc.
- Ordered: as type (EC2-S-C1) hull, MCE hull 928
- Awarded: 30 January 1942
- Builder: Bethlehem-Fairfield Shipyard, Baltimore, Maryland
- Cost: $1,073,324
- Yard number: 2078
- Way number: 14
- Laid down: 14 November 1942
- Launched: 19 December 1942
- Completed: 30 December 1942
- Identification: Call sign: KJKC
- Fate: Laid up in Reserve Fleet, 22 April 1948, sold for scrap 23 November 1970

General characteristics
- Class & type: Liberty ship; type EC2-S-C1, standard
- Tonnage: 10,865 LT DWT; 7,176 GRT
- Displacement: 3,380 long tons (3,434 t) (light); 14,245 long tons (14,474 t) (max)
- Length: 441 feet 6 inches (135 m) oa; 416 feet (127 m) pp; 427 feet (130 m) lwl
- Beam: 57 feet (17 m)
- Draft: 27 ft 9.25 in (8.4646 m)
- Installed power: 2 × Oil fired 450 °F (232 °C) boilers, operating at 220 psi (1,500 kPa); 2,500 hp (1,900 kW)
- Propulsion: 1 × triple-expansion steam engine, (manufactured by General Machinery Corp., Hamilton, Ohio); 1 × screw propeller
- Speed: 11.5 knots (21.3 km/h; 13.2 mph)
- Capacity: 562,608 cubic feet (15,931 m^{3}) (grain); 499,573 cubic feet (14,146 m^{3}) (bale)
- Complement: 38–62 USMM; 21–40 USNAG
- Armament: Varied by ship; Bow-mounted 3-inch (76 mm)/50-caliber gun; Stern-mounted 4-inch (102 mm)/50-caliber gun; 2–8 × single 20-millimeter (0.79 in) Oerlikon anti-aircraft (AA) cannons and/or, 2–8 × 37-millimeter (1.46 in) M1 AA guns

SS Lord Delaware was a Liberty ship built in the United States during World War II. She was named after Thomas West, 3rd Baron De La Warr, Lord Delaware. He was an English nobleman, a member of the House of Lords, from the death of his father in 1602 until his own death in 1618, and he served as the governor of Virginia from 1610 to 1611.

== Construction ==
Lord Delaware was laid down on 11 November 1942, under a Maritime Commission (MARCOM) contract, MCE hull 928, by the Bethlehem-Fairfield Shipyard, Baltimore, Maryland; and was launched on 7 December 1942.

== History ==
She was allocated to International Freighting Corp., on 30 December 1942.

At 18:39, on 9 March 1946, while on route from New York, to Abo, Finland, she struck a mine at 54°36′06″N 11°03′06″E, in the Fehmarn Belt. She was carrying 8,094 long tons (8,224 t) of coal and United Nations Relief and Rehabilitation Administration (UNRRA) supplies. The mine blew an 8 inches (200 mm) hole on the starboard midship. None of the 39 crew and passengers on board were injured and she was towed to port.

On 22 April 1948, she was laid up in the Wilmington Reserve Fleet, in Wilmington, North Carolina. On 25 April 1952, she was moved to the Hudson River Reserve Fleet, Hoboken, New Jersey. On 28 July 1953, she was withdrawn from the fleet to be loaded with grain under the "Grain Program 1953", she returned loaded with grain on 7 August 1953. She was again withdrawn from the fleet on 4 June 1956, to have the grain unloaded, she returned reloaded on 23 June 1956. She was again withdrawn from the fleet on 25 February 1960, to have the grain unloaded, she returned empty on 2 March 1960. On 23 November 1970, she was sold, along with two other ships, to the Eckhardt & Company, GmbH, for $222,222, to be scrapped.

== Bibliography ==
- "Bethlehem-Fairfield, Baltimore MD". www.ShipbuildingHistory.com. 7 August 2021.
- Maritime Administration. "Lord Delaware". Ship History Database Vessel Status Card. U.S. Department of Transportation, Maritime Administration.
- Davies, James (May 2004). "Specifications (As-Built)" (PDF). p. 23.
- "SS Lord Delaware".
