= Francis Knollys (the elder) =

16th-century English courtier and politician

Sir Francis Knollys
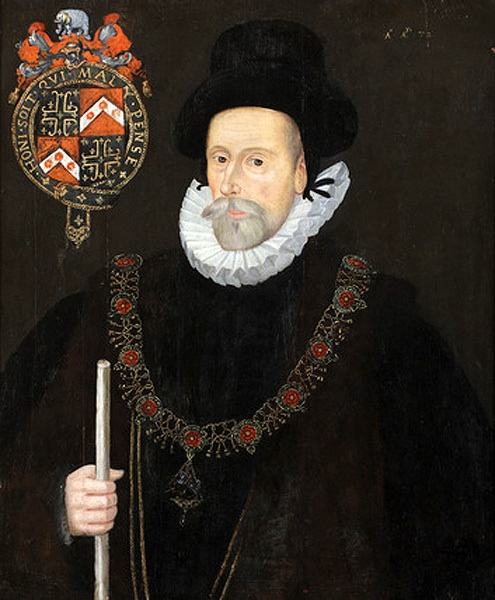
- Sir Francis Knollys
- Born: c.1511 or c.1514
- Died: 15 July 1596 (aged 84 or 85; 81 or 82)
- Buried: Rotherfield Greys, Oxfordshire
- Spouse: Catherine Carey
- Issue: Mary Knollys; Sir Henry Knollys; Lettice Knollys; Sir William Knollys, 1st Earl of Banbury; Edward Knollys; Sir Robert Knollys; Richard Knollys; Elizabeth Knollys; Maud Knollys; Sir Thomas Knollys; Sir Francis Knollys; Abigail Knollys; Anne Knollys; Catherine Knollys; Cecily Knollys; Dudley Knollys
- Father: Robert Knollys
- Mother: Lettice Peniston

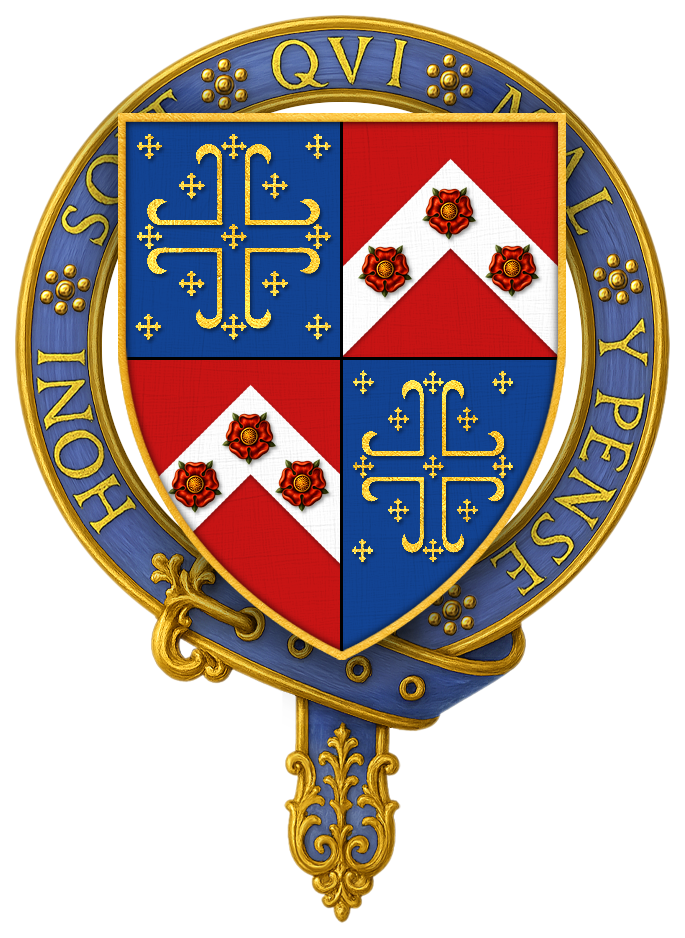
Arms of Sir Francis Knollys, encircled in the belt of the Order of the Garter

Sir Francis Knollys, KG of Rotherfield Greys, Oxfordshire (c. 1511/c. 1514 – 19 July 1596) was an English courtier in the service of Henry VIII, Edward VI, and Elizabeth I, and was a Member of Parliament for a number of constituencies.

== Early appointments ==
Francis Knollys was born 1511, the elder son of Sir Robert Knollys (d. 1520/1521) and Lettice Peniston (d. 1557/1558), daughter of Sir Thomas Peniston of Hawridge, Buckinghamshire, henchman to Henry VIII.

He appears to have received some education at Oxford. He married Catherine Carey, first cousin (as well as possible half-sister) of Queen Elizabeth I. Henry VIII extended to him the favour that he had shown to his father, and secured to him in fee the estate of Rotherfield Greys in 1538. Acts of Parliament in 1540–41 and in 1545–46 attested this grant, making his wife in the second act joint tenant with him. At the same time Francis became one of the gentlemen-pensioners at court, and in 1539 attended Anne of Cleves on her arrival in England. In 1542 he entered the House of Commons for the first time as member for Horsham.

At the beginning of Edward VI's reign, he accompanied the English army to Scotland, and was knighted by the commander-in-chief, the Duke of Somerset, at the camp at Roxburgh on 28 September 1547.

Knollys' strong Protestant convictions recommended him to the young king, and to his sister the Princess Elizabeth, and he spent much time at court, taking a prominent part not only in tournaments there, but also in religious discussion. On 25 November 1551, he was present at Sir William Cecil's house, at a conference between several Catholics and Protestants respecting the corporeal presence in the Sacrament. About the same date, he was granted the manors of Caversham in Oxfordshire (now Berkshire) and Cholsey in Berkshire (now Oxfordshire). At the end of 1552, he visited Ireland on public business.

== Mary I of England and exile ==
The accession of Mary I in 1553 darkened Knollys' prospects. His religious opinions placed him in opposition to the government, and he deemed it prudent to cross to Germany. On his departure the Princess Elizabeth wrote to his wife a sympathetic note, expressing a wish that they would soon be able to return in safety. Knollys first took up his residence in Frankfurt, where he was admitted a church-member on 21 December 1557, but afterwards removed to Strasbourg. According to Fuller, he "bountifully communicated to the necessities" of his fellow-exiles in Germany, and at Strasburg he seems to have been on intimate terms with John Jewel and Peter Martyr.

Before Mary's death he returned to England, and as a man "of assured understanding and truth, and well affected to the Protestant religion," he was admitted to Elizabeth's privy council in December 1558. He was soon afterwards made Vice-Chamberlain of the Household and captain of the halberdiers, while his wife – a first cousin of Elizabeth – became a woman of the queen's privy chamber. On the death of his mother in 1558 he took possession of Greys Court at Rotherfield Greys and undertook a remodelling of the building in 1573–74. In 1560 Knollys' wife and son Robert were granted for their lives the manor of Taunton, part of the property of the see of Winchester.

== Member of Parliament and other offices ==
In 1559 Knollys was chosen MP for Arundel and in 1562 knight of the shire for Oxfordshire. He was appointed chief steward of Oxford in Feb 1564 until 1592. In 1572 he was re-elected member for Oxfordshire, and sat for that constituency until his death. The Queen granted him the manors of Littlemore and Temple Cowley. Throughout his parliamentary career he was a frequent spokesman for the government on questions of general politics, but in ecclesiastical matters he preserved as a zealous puritan an independent attitude.

Knollys' friendship with the queen and Cecil led to his employment in many state offices. In 1563 he was governor of Portsmouth, and was much harassed in August by the difficulties of supplying the needs in men and money of the Earl of Warwick, who was engaged on his disastrous expedition to Le Havre. In April 1566 he was sent to Ireland to control the expenditure of Sir Henry Sidney, the lord deputy, who was trying to repress the rebellion of Shane O'Neill, and was much hampered by the interference of court factions at home; but Knollys found himself compelled, contrary to Elizabeth's wish, to approve Sidney's plans. It was, he explained, out of the question to conduct the campaign against the Irish rebels on strictly economical lines. In August 1564 he accompanied the queen to Cambridge, and was created MA. Two years later he went to Oxford, also with his sovereign, and received a like distinction there. In the same year he was appointed treasurer of the queen's chamber and in 1570 promoted to Treasurer of the Household.

== Mary, Queen of Scots ==
In May 1568 Mary, Queen of Scots fled to England, and flung herself on Elizabeth's protection. She had found refuge in Carlisle Castle, and the delicate duty of taking charge of the fugitive was entrusted jointly to Knollys and to Henry Scrope, 9th Baron Scrope of Bolton. On 28 May Knollys arrived at the castle, and was admitted to Mary's presence. At his first interview he was conscious of Mary's powerful fascination. But to her requests for an interview with Elizabeth, and for help to regain her throne, he returned the evasive answers which Elizabeth's advisers had suggested to him, and he frankly drew her attention to the suspicions in which Darnley's murder involved her. Knollys wrote to Elizabeth of his fear that Mary, a prisoner of "agility and spirit" might escape from the castle to the Scottish border using household linen "towels and toyes" as a rope, but he also worried that bringing her further into England might cause sedition.

A month passed, and no decision was reached in London respecting Mary's future. Knollys described her activities in letters to Elizabeth I, including watching two football matches on a playing green outside the castle's postern gate. On 13 July Knollys contrived to remove her, despite "'her tragical demonstrations", to Bolton Castle, the seat of Lord Scrope, where he tried to amuse her by teaching her to write and speak English. Knollys's position grew more and more distasteful, and writing on 16 July to Cecil, whom he kept well informed of Mary's conversation and conduct, he angrily demanded his recall. But while lamenting his occupation, Knollys conscientiously endeavoured to convert his prisoner to his puritanic views, and she read the English prayer-book under his guidance. In his discussions with her he commended so unreservedly the doctrines and forms of Geneva that Elizabeth, on learning his line of argument, sent him a sharp reprimand. Knollys, writing to Cecil in self-defence, described how contentedly Mary accepted his plain speaking on religious topics. Mary made in fact every effort to maintain good relations with him. Late in August, when Knollys was away at Seaton Delaval, she sent him a present for his wife, desired his wife's acquaintance, and wrote to him a very friendly note, her first attempt in English composition. The gift was a chain of gold pomander beads strung on gold wire.

In October, when schemes for marrying Mary to an English nobleman were under consideration, Knollys proposed that his wife's nephew, George Carey, might prove a suitable match. In November the inquiry into Mary's misdeeds which had begun at York, was reopened at Westminster, and Knollys pointed out that he needed a larger company of retainers to keep his prisoner safe from a possible attempt at rescue. In December he was directed by Elizabeth to induce Mary to assent to her abdication of the Scottish throne. In January 1569 he plainly told Elizabeth that, in declining to allow Mary either to be condemned or to be acquitted on the charges brought against her, she was inviting perils which were likely to overwhelm her, and entreated her to leave the decision of Mary's fate to her well-tried councillors. On 20 January orders arrived at Bolton to transfer Mary to Tutbury, where the Earl of Shrewsbury was to take charge of her. Against the removal the Scottish queen protested in a pathetic note to Knollys, intended for Elizabeth's eye, but next day she was forced to leave Bolton, and Knollys remained with her at Tutbury till 3 February. His wife's death then called him home. Mary blamed Elizabeth for the fatal termination of Lady Knollys' illness, attributing it to her husband's enforced absence in the north.

== Relations with Elizabeth I ==
In April 1571 Knollys strongly supported the retrospective clauses of the bill for the better protection of Queen Elizabeth, by which any person who had previously put forward a claim to the throne was adjudged guilty of high treason. Next year he was appointed treasurer of the royal household, and he entertained Elizabeth at Abbey House in Reading , where he often resided by permission of the crown. The office of treasurer he retained till his death.

Elizabeth was a first cousin of Knollys' wife. Although he was invariably on good terms personally with his sovereign, he never concealed his distrust of her statesmanship. Her unwillingness to take "safe counsel", her apparent readiness to encourage parasites and flatterers, whom he called "King Richard the Second's men", was, he boldly pointed out, responsible for most of her dangers and difficulties. In July 1578 he repeated his warnings in a long letter, and begged her to adopt straightforward measures so as to avert such disasters as the conquest of the Low Countries by Spain, the revolt of Scotland to France and Mary Stuart, and the growth of papists in England. He did not oppose the first proposals for the queen's marriage with Alençon which were made in 1579, but during the negotiations he showed reluctance to accept the scheme, and Elizabeth threatened that "his zeal for religion would cost him dear".

In December 1581 he attended the Jesuit Campion's execution, and asked him on the scaffold whether he renounced the pope. He was a commissioner for the trials of Parry the Jesuit in 1585, of Anthony Babington and his fellow-conspirators, whom he tried to argue into Protestantism, in 1586, and of Queen Mary at Fotheringay in the same year. He urged Mary's immediate execution in 1587 both in Parliament and in the council. In April 1589 he was a commissioner for the trial of Philip Howard, earl of Arundel. On 16 December 1584 he introduced into the House of Commons the bill legalising a national association to protect the queen from assassination. In 1585 he offered to contribute £100 for seven years towards the expenses of the war for the defence of the Low Countries, and renewed the offer, which was not accepted, in July 1586. In 1588–9 he was placed in command of the land forces of Hertfordshire and Cambridgeshire, which had been called together to resist the Spanish Armada. Knollys was interested in the voyages of Frobisher and Drake, and took shares in the first and second Cathay expeditions.

== Puritanism ==
Knollys never wavered in his consistent championship of the puritans. In May 1574 he joined Edmund Grindal (Archbishop of York), Sir Walter Mildmay, and Sir Thomas Smith in a letter to John Parkhurst (Bishop of Norwich), arguing in favour of the religious exercises known as "prophesyings". But he was zealous in opposition to heresy, and in September 1581 he begged Burghley and Robert Dudley, 1st Earl of Leicester to repress such "anabaptisticall sectaries" as members of the "Family of Love", "who do serve the turn of the papists". Writing to John Whitgift (Archbishop of Canterbury), 20 June 1584, he hotly condemned the archbishop's attempts to prosecute puritan preachers in the Court of High Commission as unjustly despotic, and treading "the highway to the pope". He supported Cartwright with equal vehemence. On 24 May 1584 he sent to Burghley a bitter attack on "the undermining ambition and covetousness of some of our bishops", and on their persecutions of the puritans. Repeating his views in July 1586, he urged the banishment of all recusants and the exclusion from public offices of all who married recusants. In 1588 he charged Whitgift with endangering the queen's safety by his popish tyranny, and embodied his accusation in a series of articles which Whitgift characterised as a fond and scandalous syllogism.

In the parliament of 1588–9 he vainly endeavoured to pass a bill against non-residence of the clergy and pluralities. In the course of the discussion he denounced the claims of the bishops "to keep courts in their own name", and denied them any "worldly pre-eminence". This speech, "related by himself" to Burghley, was published in 1608, together with a letter to Knollys from his friend, the puritan John Rainolds, in which Bishop Bancroft's sermon at St Paul's Cross (9 February 1588–9) was keenly criticised. The volume was entitled "Informations, or a Protestation and a Treatise from Scotland … all suggesting the Usurpation of Papal Bishops". Knollys' contribution reappeared as "Speeches used in the parliament by Sir Francis Knoles", in William Stoughton's "Assertion for True and Christian Church Policie" (London, 1642). Throughout 1589 and 1590 he was seeking, in correspondence with Burghley, to convince the latter of the impolicy of adopting Whitgift's theory of the divine right of bishops. On 9 January 1591 he told his correspondent that he marvelled "how her Majestie can be persuaded that she is in as much danger of such as are called Purytanes as she is of the Papysts". Finally, on 14 May 1591, he declared that he would prefer to retire from politics and political office rather than cease to express his hostility to the bishops' claims with full freedom.

== Domestic affairs and death ==
Knollys' domestic affairs at times caused him anxiety. In spite of his friendly relations with the Earl of Leicester, he did not approve the royal favourite's intrigues with his daughter, Lettice, widow of Walter Devereux, 1st Earl of Essex, and he finally insisted on their marriage at Wanstead on 21 September 1578. The wayward temper of his grandson, Robert Devereux, 2nd Earl of Essex (son of his daughter Lettice by her first husband), was a source of trouble to him in his later years, and the queen seemed inclined to make him responsible for the youth's vagaries. Knollys was created KG in 1593 and died on 19 July 1596. He was buried at Rotherfield Greys, and an elaborate monument, with effigies of seven sons, six daughters, and his son William's wife, still stands in the church there.

== Issue ==
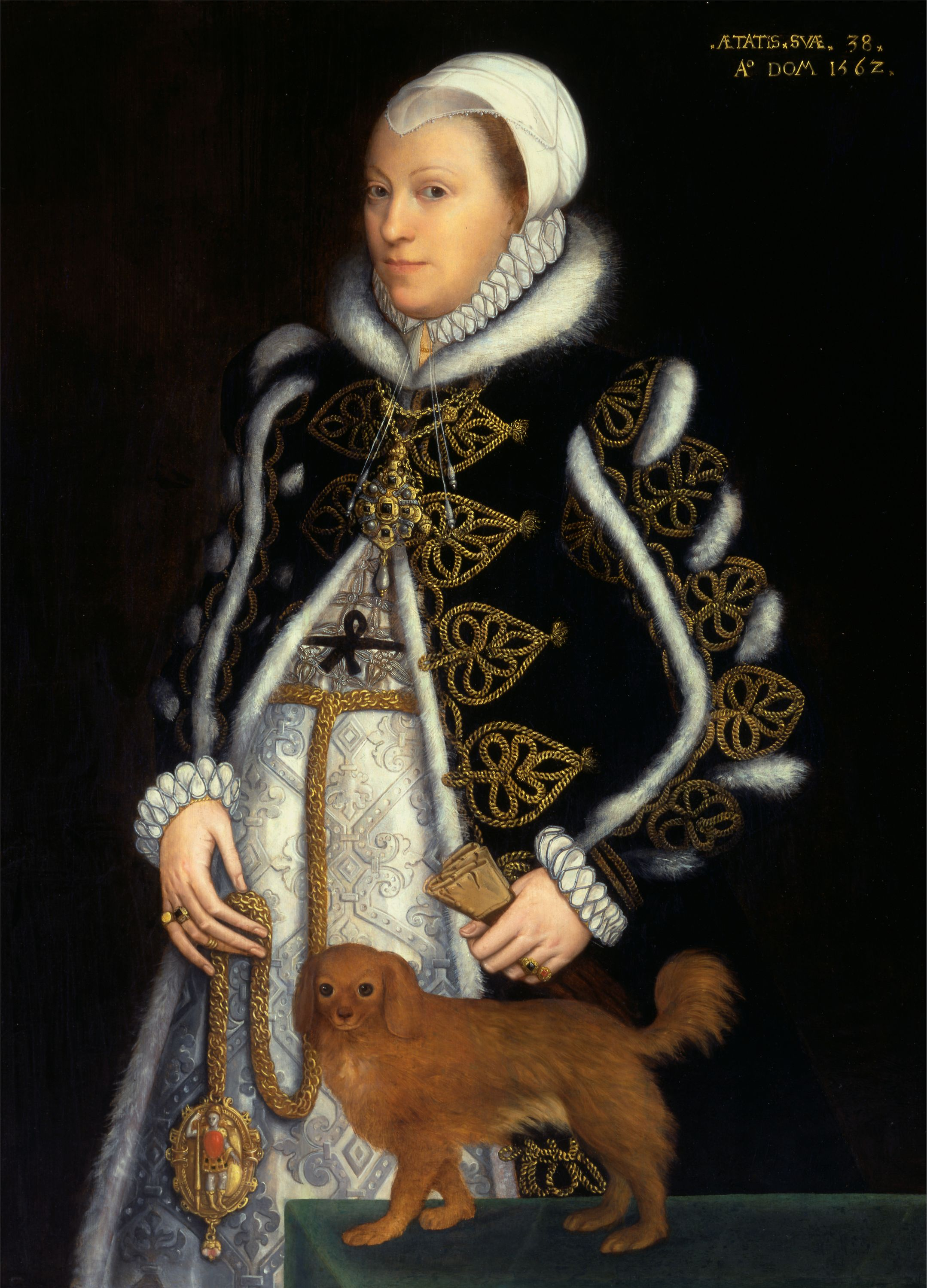
Catherine Carey.

He married Catherine Carey, the daughter of Sir William Carey of Aldenham and Mary Boleyn in Hertfordshire on 26 April 1540. Sir Francis and Lady Knollys had a total of 16 children:

- Mary Knollys (c. 1541 – 1593). She married Edward Stalker.
- Sir Henry Knollys (c. 1542 – 1583). He was a Member of Parliament representing Shoreham, Sussex in 1562, Reading, Berkshire (1563–1572) and then Oxfordshire. Esquire of the Body to Elizabeth I. He was married to Margaret Cave (1549–1600), daughter of Sir Ambrose Cave and Margaret Willington. Their daughter Lettice Knollys (1583–1655) married before 19 June 1602 William Paget, 4th Baron Paget.
- Lettice Knollys, Countess of Essex and of Leicester (8 November 1543 – 25 December 1634). She married first Walter Devereux, 1st Earl of Essex, secondly Robert Dudley, 1st Earl of Leicester and thirdly Sir Christopher Blount.
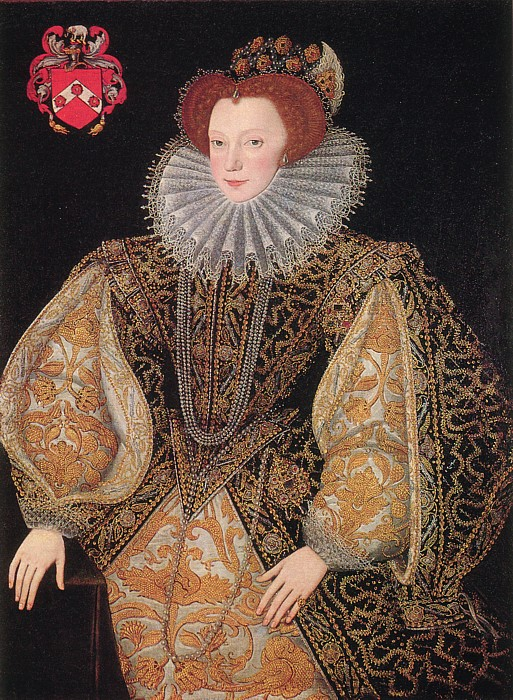
  Lettice Knollys, Francis and Catherine's daughter

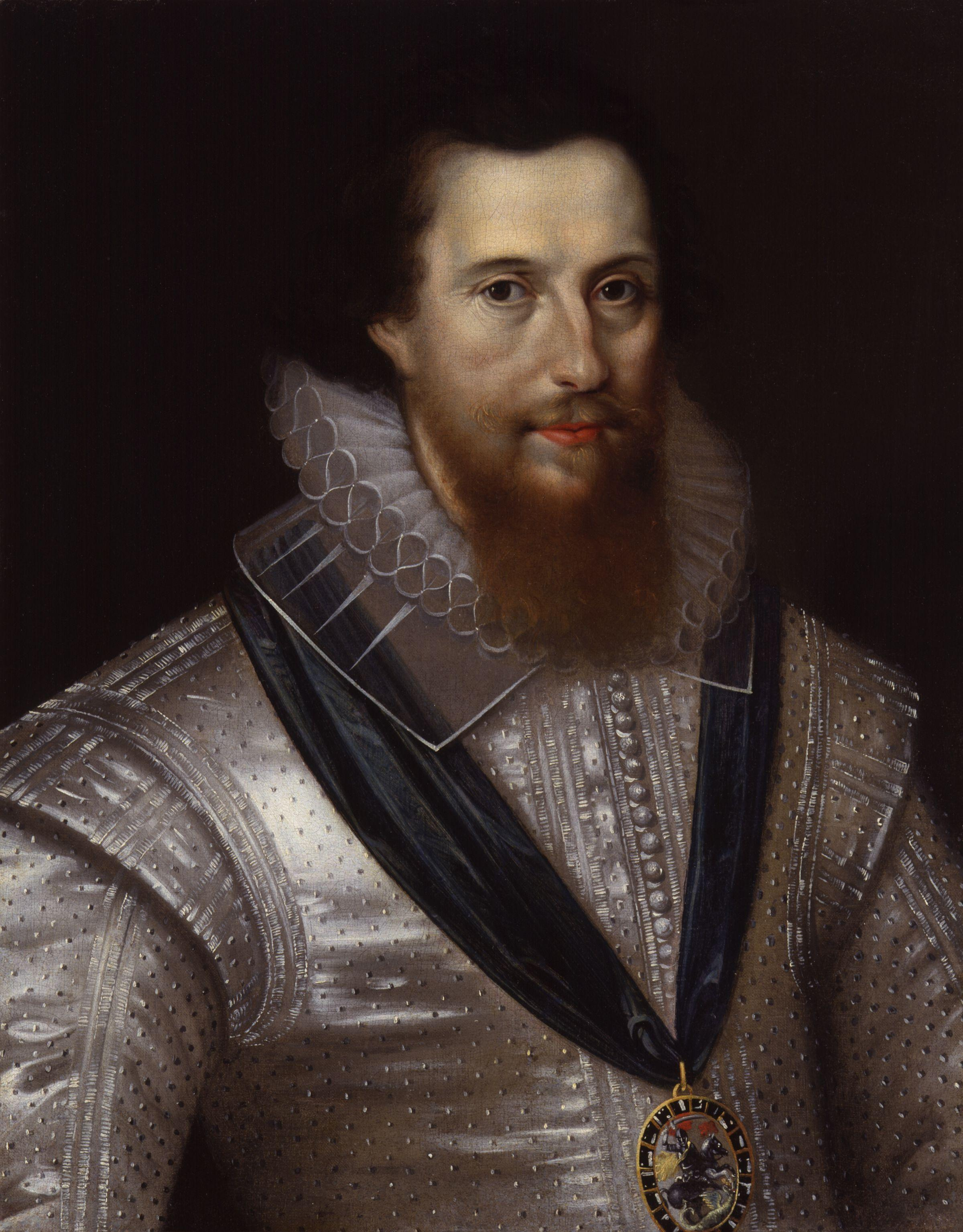
Robert Devereux, son of Lettice Knollys

Elizabeth Knollys, Francis and Catherine's daughter

- Sir William Knollys, 1st Earl of Banbury, (c. 1544 – 25 May 1632). Member of Parliament for Tregony and Oxfordshire. He was married first to Dorothy Bray, who was 20 years his senior; and secondly to Elizabeth Howard, daughter of Thomas Howard, 1st Earl of Suffolk and his second wife Catherine Knyvett.
- Edward Knollys (1546–1580). He was a member of Parliament for Oxford (1571–1575).
- Sir Robert Knollys (1547 – 1619 or 1626). Member of Parliament representing Reading, Berkshire (1572–1589), Brecknockshire (1589–1604), Abingdon, Oxfordshire (1604, 1624–1625) and finally Berkshire again (1626). He married Catherine Vaughan, daughter of Sir Rowland Vaughan, of Porthamel.
- Richard Knollys (1548 – 21 August 1596). Member of Parliament representing first Wallingford (1584) and then Northampton (1588). Married Joan Heigham, daughter of John Heigham, of Gifford's Hall, Wickhambrook, Suffolk.
- Elizabeth Knollys (15 June 1549 – c.1605). She married Sir Thomas Leighton of Feckenham, Worcester, son of John Leighton of Watlesburgh and Joyce Sutton, in 1578. Her husband served as Governor of Jersey and Guernsey.
- Maud Knollys (c.1550 – 155?/6?), died young.
- Sir Francis Knollys "the Younger" (c. 1552 – 1648). Privateer and admiral and Member of Parliament representing several constituencies from 1575 to his death in 1648. He married Lettice Barrett, daughter of John Barrett, of Hanham; their daughter, Letitia, married John Hampden.
- Anne Knollys (19 July 1555 – 30 August 1608), who married Thomas West, 2nd Baron De La Warr, by whom she had six sons and eight daughters, including Thomas West, 3rd Baron De La Warr, after whom the state of Delaware is named.
- Sir Thomas Knollys (1558 – 1596). Better known for service in the Eighty Years' War (1568–1648). Governor of Ostend in 1586. Married Odelia de Morana, daughter of John de Morada, Marquess of Bergen.
- Catherine Knollys (21 October 1559 – 20 December 1620). Married first in October 1578 Gerald FitzGerald, Baron Offaly (son of Gerald FitzGerald, 11th Earl of Kildare and Mabel Browne) and secondly Sir Phillip Butler, of Watton Woodhall. She was the mother of Lettice Digby, 1st Baroness Offaly.
- Cecily Knollys (c. 1560 - ?). No known descendants.
- Margaret Knollys. No known descendants.
- Dudley Knollys (1562 - 156?/157?), died young.

== See also ==
- Knollys (family)
