= Robert Hyde (MP for Abingdon) =

English politician

Sir Robert Hyde (c. 1578 – after 1638) was an English politician who sat in the House of Commons between 1621 and 1626.

Hyde was second son of William Hyde of South Denchworth in Berkshire (now Oxfordshire) and his wife Catherine daughter of George Gill of Wyddial in Hertfordshire. He was the brother of Sir George Hyde and lived at Charlton in Berkshire (now Oxfordshire). He was knighted on 23 July 1603 at the coronation of James I.

In 1621, Hyde was elected Member of Parliament for Abingdon. He was elected MP for Wootton Bassett in 1625 and Cricklade in 1626.

He married Joan, the daughter of Stephen Brice of Witney, Oxfordshire and the widow of Richard Ashcombe of Curbridge, Oxfordshire. They had no children. In 1638 he gave his age as 60 and said he had been confined in the Fleet Prison for debt.

A Robert Hyde (born c. 1595) matriculated at Magdalen Hall, Oxford, on 9 March 1610, aged 15, and was assumed by Alumni Oxonienses to be the same person; however, the History of Parliament does not make this connection.

Parliament of England
Preceded by Sir Robert Knollys	Member of Parliament for Abingdon; 1621–1622	Succeeded by Sir Robert Knollys
Preceded by Sir Roland Egerton, 1st Baronet; John Bankes	Member of Parliament for Wootton Bassett; 1625; With: Sir Walter Tichborne	Succeeded by Sir John Francklyn; Sir Thomas Lake
