= Thomas West, 2nd Baron De La Warr =

English Baron

The Right Honourable Thomas West, 2nd Baron De La Warr
- Other names: 11th Baron De la Warr
- Born: c. 1550; Hampshire
- Died: 24 March 1602 (N.S.)
- Noble family: De La Warr
- Spouse: Anne Knollys
- Issue: Sir Robert West; Thomas West, 3rd Baron De La Warr; Walsingham West; Francis West; John West; Nathaniel West; Elizabeth West; Lettice West; Anne West; Penelope West; Katherine West; Helen West; Anne West (II); Elizabeth West (II)
- Father: William West, 1st Baron De La Warr
- Mother: Elizabeth Strange

Thomas West, 2nd and 11th Baron De La Warr (/ˈdɛləwɛər/ DEL-ə-wair; b. c. 1550 – d. 24 March 1601/1602) of Wherwell Abbey, Hampshire, was a member of Elizabeth I's Privy Council.

== Biography ==
Thomas West was the eldest son of William West, 1st Baron De La Warr, by his first wife, Elizabeth Strange, the daughter of Thomas Strange of Chesterton, Gloucestershire. He succeeded his father, who had been created Baron De La Warr and died in 1595, by letters patent in 1597.

He was a Member (MP) of the Parliament of England for Yarmouth, Isle of Wight in 1586 and for Aylesbury in 1593. He was knighted in 1587. It is probable, though uncertain, that he had previously represented Chichester in the 1571 Parliament and East Looe in the 1572 Parliament.

From 1590 to his death he was one of the two Chamberlains of the Exchequer.

In 1597 he petitioned the House of Lords to have the precedence of the original barony, 1299, on the basis that he actually held the ancient peerage. After his claim was admitted, he sometimes referred to himself as 11th Baron.

== Marriage and issue ==
West married, on 19 November 1571, Anne Knollys, daughter of Sir Francis Knollys and Catherine Carey, daughter of William Carey, esquire, by whom he had six sons and eight daughters:

- Sir Robert West, who married, about 1592, Elizabeth Cocke, daughter of Henry Cocke of Broxbourne, Hertfordshire, and predeceased his father. After West's death, his widow married Sir Robert Oxenbridge.
- Thomas West, 3rd Baron De La Warr (7 July 1577 – c. February 1624), who married Cecily Shirley, youngest daughter of Sir Thomas Shirley and Anne Kempe, daughter of Sir Thomas Kempe of Olantigh, Kent.
- Walsingham West.
- Francis West (28 October 1586 – c.1634), esquire, Governor of Virginia, who emigrated to Virginia, and married firstly, before 6 February 1626, Margaret, widow of Edward Blayney, by whom he had a son, Francis West, and a daughter, Elizabeth West, and secondly, on 31 March 1628, Temperance Flowerdew (d. December 1628), widow of Sir George Yeardley, Governor of Virginia, daughter of Anthony Flowerdew of Hethersett, Norfolk, by Martha Stanley.
- John West (14 December 1590 – 1659), Governor of Virginia, who emigrated to Virginia, and married Anne (surname unknown), and by her had one known son, Col John West II. The old myth about his wife Anne possibly being a daughter of George Percy is further addressed and discredited in detail in Governor John West's and George Percy's profiles.
- Lieutenant Colonel Nathaniel West (30 November 1592 – 7 June 1618), who emigrated to Virginia, where in 1621 he married Frances Greville (d.1634), by whom he had a son, Nathaniel West. His widow married secondly Abraham Peirsey, esquire (d. 16 January 1628), and thirdly Captain Samuel Mathews, esquire (died c. March 1658). (Edit: Date of death or date of marriage is wrong.)
- Elizabeth West (11 September 1573 – 15 January 1633), who married firstly at Wherwell, Hampshire, on 12 February 1594, as his second wife, Sir Herbert Pelham of Michelham (Bucksteep, Sussex, 1546 – Fordington, Dorset, 12 April 1620), Esquire, a widower with two sons and one daughter by his first wife, Katherine Thatcher (1550 - West Ham, Sussex, 1550 - Worcester, Worcestershire, 1593), by whom she had three sons and six daughters.
- Lettice West (b. 1579), who married Henry Ludlow.
- Anne West (b. 13 February 1588), who married firstly, by license dated 30 August 1608, John Pellatt (d. 22 October 1625), esquire, of Bolney, Sussex, by whom she had three daughters; secondly Christopher Swale (d. 7 September 1645), by whom she had a son, Christopher, and a daughter, Elizabeth; and thirdly Leonard Lechford (died c. 29 November 1673), by whom she had no issue.
- Penelope West (9 September 1582 – c.1619), who married, about 1599, as his first wife, Herbert Pelham (c.1580 – 13 July 1624)), esquire, of Hastings, Sussex, stepson of Penelope West's elder sister, Elizabeth, by whom she had five sons and four daughters.
- Katherine West (b. 1583), who married Ralph Benoni Barlowe.
- Helen West (b. 15 December 1587), who married Sir William Savage of Winchester, Hampshire, by whom she had a son, John Savage, and two daughters, Cecily and Anne.
- Anne Hannah West (again) who married George Merriman (b. 1559) on 24 Aug 1610.
- Elizabeth West (again), who married as his second wife Sir Richard Saltonstall of Huntwick Grange, near Nostell, Yorkshire.

== Ancestry ==
Ancestors of Thomas West, 2nd Baron De La Warr

Richard West, 7th Baron De La Warr
Sir Thomas West, 8th Baron De La Warr
Catharine or Catherine Hungerford
Sir George West
Sir Roger Copley, of Roughway
Eleanor Copley
Anne (or Ann) or Jane Hoo
William West, 1st Baron De La Warr
Sir Robert Morton, of Lechlade
Sir Anthony (not Robert) Morton, of Lechlade
Elizabeth Morton
Thomas West, 2nd Baron De La Warr
Thomas Strange, of Chesterton
Elizabeth Strange

== Notes ==
Peerage of England
Preceded by William West	Baron De La Warr; 1595–1602	Succeeded by Thomas West
