= Thomas West, 3rd Baron De La Warr =

English colonial administrator (1576–1618)

The Right Honourable The Lord De La Warr
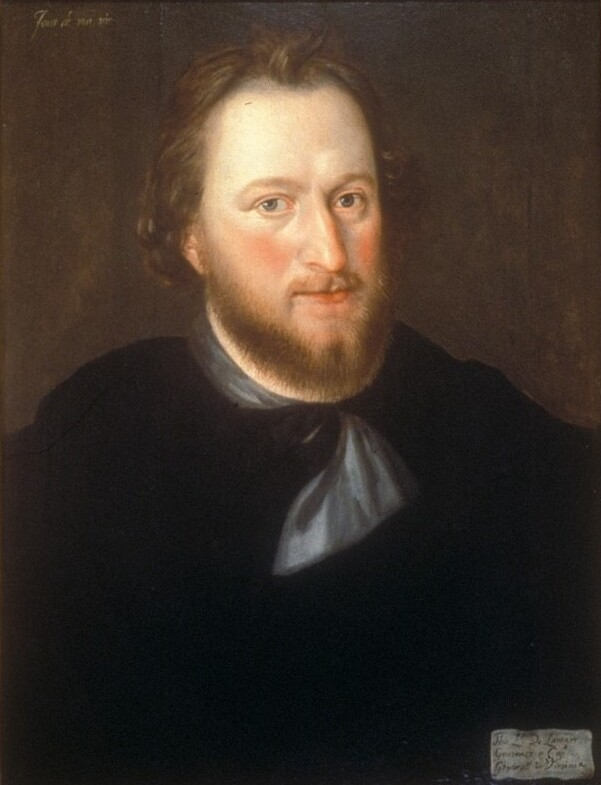
- c. 1605 portrait of De La Warr

Lord Governor and Captain General of the Virginia Colony

Personal details
- Born: 9 July 1576 Wherwell, Hampshire, England
- Died: 7 June 1618 (aged 41) Atlantic Ocean, en route to Jamestown, Virginia, from London, England
- Resting place: Jamestown, Virginia
- Spouse(s): Cecilia Shirley, Lady De La Warr (m. 1596)
- Relations: (see Earl De La Warr)
- Parents: Thomas West, 2nd Baron De La Warr (father); Anne Knollys (mother)

Thomas West, 3rd Baron De La Warr (/ˈdɛləwɛər/ DEL-ə-wair; 9 July 1576 – 7 June 1618) was an English colonial administrator for whom the bay, the river, and, consequently, a Native American people and U.S. state, all later called "Delaware", were named. A member of the House of Lords from the death of his father in 1602 until his own death in 1618, he served as the governor of Virginia from 1610 to 1611.

There have been two creations of Baron De La Warr, and West came from the second. He was the son of Thomas West, 2nd Baron De La Warr, of Wherwell Abbey in Hampshire, and Anne Knollys, daughter of Catherine Knollys, making him a great-grandson of Mary Boleyn, the sister of Anne Boleyn, the second wife of King Henry VIII. He was born at Wherwell, Hampshire, England, and died at sea while travelling from England to Virginia. Counting from the original creation of the title, West would be the 12th Baron.

== Early life ==
As the eldest son of the 2nd Baron De La Warr, Thomas West received his education at Queen's College, Oxford. He served in the English army under Robert Devereux, 2nd Earl of Essex, and, in 1601, was charged with supporting Essex's ill-fated insurrection against Queen Elizabeth I, but acquitted of those charges. He was a Member (MP) of the Parliament of England for Lymington in 1597.

He succeeded his father as Baron De La Warr in 1602. It was said that he became a member of the Privy Council, but this has been disproved. In 1645 Dame Cicly petitioned the House of Lords to continue the pension that King James had granted her husband. There is only one supposedly contemporaneous portrait of Thomas, from 1605, but its authenticity has been questioned on the basis of the sitter's attire and physical attributes.

== Governor of Virginia ==
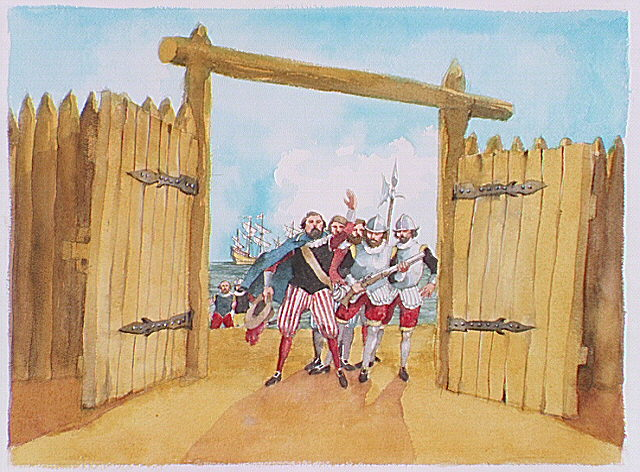
Dramatized illustration of Lord De La Warr and soldiers entering James Fort through the south gate, 1610

Lord De La Warr was the largest investor in the London Company, which received two charters to settle colonists in the New World, and furnished and sent several vessels to accomplish that aim. He was appointed governor-for-life and captain-general of the Virginia, to replace the governing council of the colony under the presidency of Captain John Smith. In November 1609, the Powhatans killed John Ratcliffe, the Jamestown Colony's Council President, and attacked the colony in what became the First Anglo-Powhatan War. As part of England's response, De La Warr recruited and equipped a contingent of 150 men and outfitted three ships at his own expense, and sailed from England in March 1610. De La Warr used tactics learned from Ireland, including unrestricted slaughter of their enemies. While the Native Americans were harsh, they sometimes spared non-combatants, and captured prisoners of war. In contrast, De Le Warr burned entire villages, and took no prisoners.

In 1610 captain Samuel Argall named Delaware Bay in honor of Lord De La Warr. Shortly afterwards Dutch settlers along the bay gave it a different name, but the name Delaware Bay was restored when the English took control of the area in 1665. Lord De La Warr contracted malaria or scurvy in 1611. He left the colony on a ship captained by Argall headed to the West Indies to recover but was blown off course by a storm, ending up in Faial Island, Azores. De La Warr returned to London, England in June, 1611. He requested a private audience from King James I to explain why he wasn't governing in Virginia. He was summoned by the Virginia Company where he explained his health conditions ("flux", cramps, gout, and scurvy) in detail and that his diet of oranges and lemons in the Azores helped him recover.

Later that year, De La Warr published a book titled The Relation of the Right Honourable the Lord De-La-Warre, Lord Governour and Captaine Generall of the Colonie, planted in Virginea. The work was mockingly subtitled: A Short Relation made by the Lord De-La-Warre, to the Lords and others of the Councill of Virginea, touching his unexpected returne home, and afterwards delivered to the General Assembly of said Company..., written by Company employee Samuel Calvert.

In the autumn of 1616, Baron De La Warr and his wife Lady Cecilia introduced John Rolfe and his wife, Pocahontas, into English society. The visitors from Virginia were in London to raise funds for the Virginia Company of London and to encourage colonization of Virginia. De La Warr remained the nominal governor, and after receiving complaints from the colonists about Argall's tyranny in governing them on his behalf, he set sail for Virginia again in 1618 aboard the Neptune to investigate those charges. He died at sea on 7 June.

== Burial ==
It was thought for many years that Lord De La Warr had been buried in the Azores or at sea. By 2006, researchers had concluded that his body was brought to Jamestown for burial. In October 2017, archaeologists excavated remains from underneath one of the churches at Historic Jamestowne. While two sets of remains were De La Warr's relatives, Sir Ferdinando Wainman and Captain William West, none were identified as Lord De La Warr.

== Personal life ==
On 25 November 1596, De La Warr married Cecily Shirley (born c. 1579 died c. 1662), the daughter of Sir Thomas Shirley of Wiston, Sussex, and his wife Anne, daughter of Sir Thomas Kempe. They had the following known children:

- Cecilia (died February 1638), who married firstly Sir Francis Bindlosse and secondly after 1629 John Byron, 1st Baron Byron. She was buried at Hucknall-Torkard in Nottinghamshire.
- Lucy, who married Sir Robert Byron (d. after 1643), Governor of Liverpool and a Colonel in the service of the Royalist Infantry Forces who fought in the English Civil War.
- Robert, who married Elizabeth Coch.
- Henry (1603–1628), who succeeded his father as the 4th Baron De La Warr, married Isabella, daughter of Sir Thomas Edmondes, in March 1625. He died at the age of 24 and was succeeded by his son Charles West, 5th Baron De La Warr.

Lord De La Warr's brother, John West, later became governor. An old and now disproved theory claimed that he married Anne Percy, daughter of George Percy. One source for that theory seems to be this book, which contains no actual contemporaneous sources for its claim. However, the more authoritative archives of the Percy family in England actually disprove that claim., and say that George Percy died unmarried in 1632. See his profile (link above) for more details, including those sources.

== Legacy ==
The World War II Liberty Ship SS Lord Delaware was named in his honor.

== Notes ==
Parliament of England
Preceded by Richard Blount; John Knight	Member of Parliament for Lymington; 1597–1598; With: Henry Wallop	Succeeded by Sir Francis Darcy; Thomas Ridley
Peerage of England
Preceded by Thomas West	Baron De La Warr; 1602–1618	Succeeded by Henry West
Government offices
Preceded by Thomas Gates	Governor of Virginia; 1610–1611	Succeeded by George Percy
