= William Knollys, 1st Earl of Banbury =

English nobleman

The Earl of Banbury
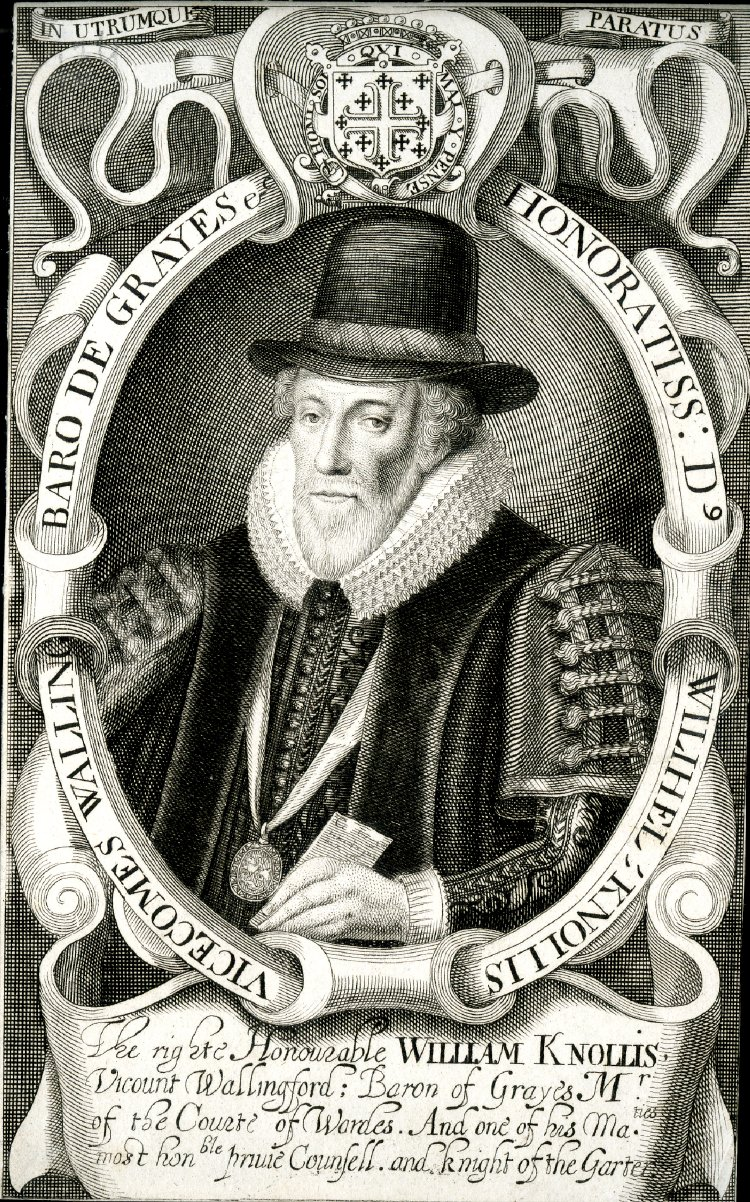
- Born: 1544
- Died: 25 May 1632 (aged 87–88)
- Spouses: Dorothy Bray (c.1524 – 31 October 1605); Elizabeth Howard (d. 1658) (1605–1632)
- Children: Edward; Nicholas
- Parent(s): Sir Francis Knollys; Catherine Carey

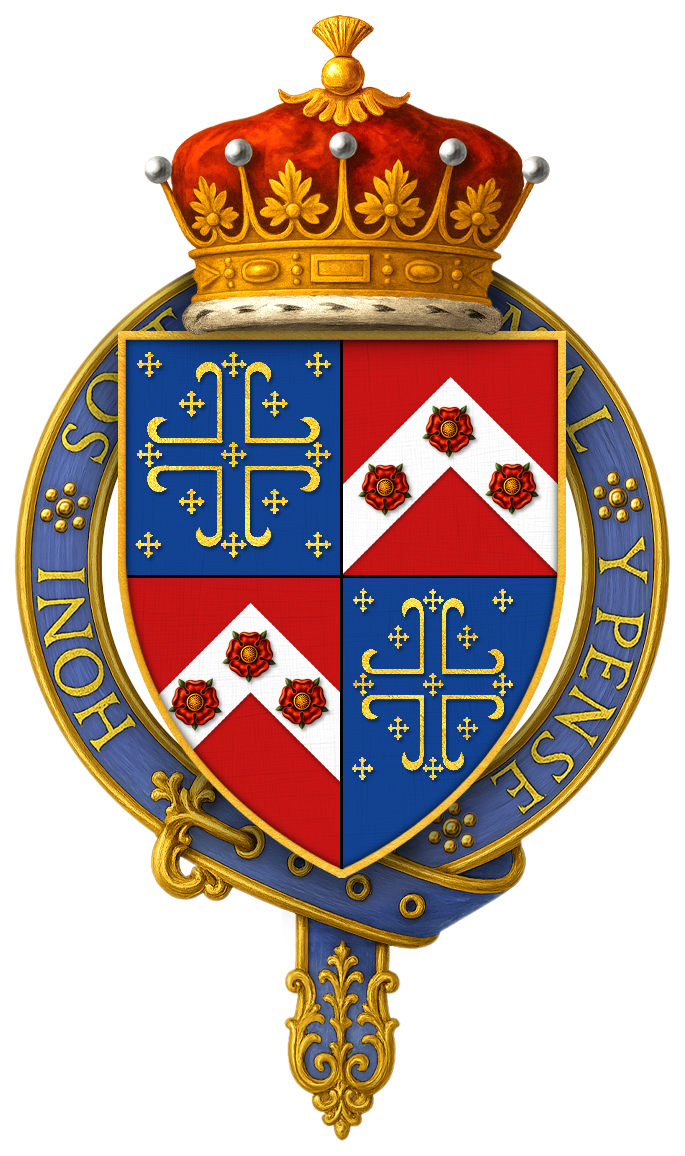
Arms of Sir William Knollys, 1st Earl of Banbury, KG

William Knollys, 1st Earl of Banbury (1544 – 25 May 1632) was an English nobleman at the court of Queen Elizabeth I and King James I.

== Biography ==
He was the son of Sir Francis Knollys, of Greys Court in Oxfordshire, and of Reading, in Berkshire, and his wife, Catherine Carey, a first cousin of Elizabeth I. Knollys was a Member of Parliament (MP) for Stafford in 1571, Tregony from 1572 to 1581 and 1583 to 1584 and for Oxfordshire from 1584 to 1586, 1592 to 1593 and 1601. In 1584 he was made castellan of Wallingford Castle. In 1596 he was appointed Lord Lieutenant of Berkshire, a position he held until his death. In 1586 he served as a captain in the Netherlands under his brother-in-law Robert Dudley, Earl of Leicester, who knighted him.

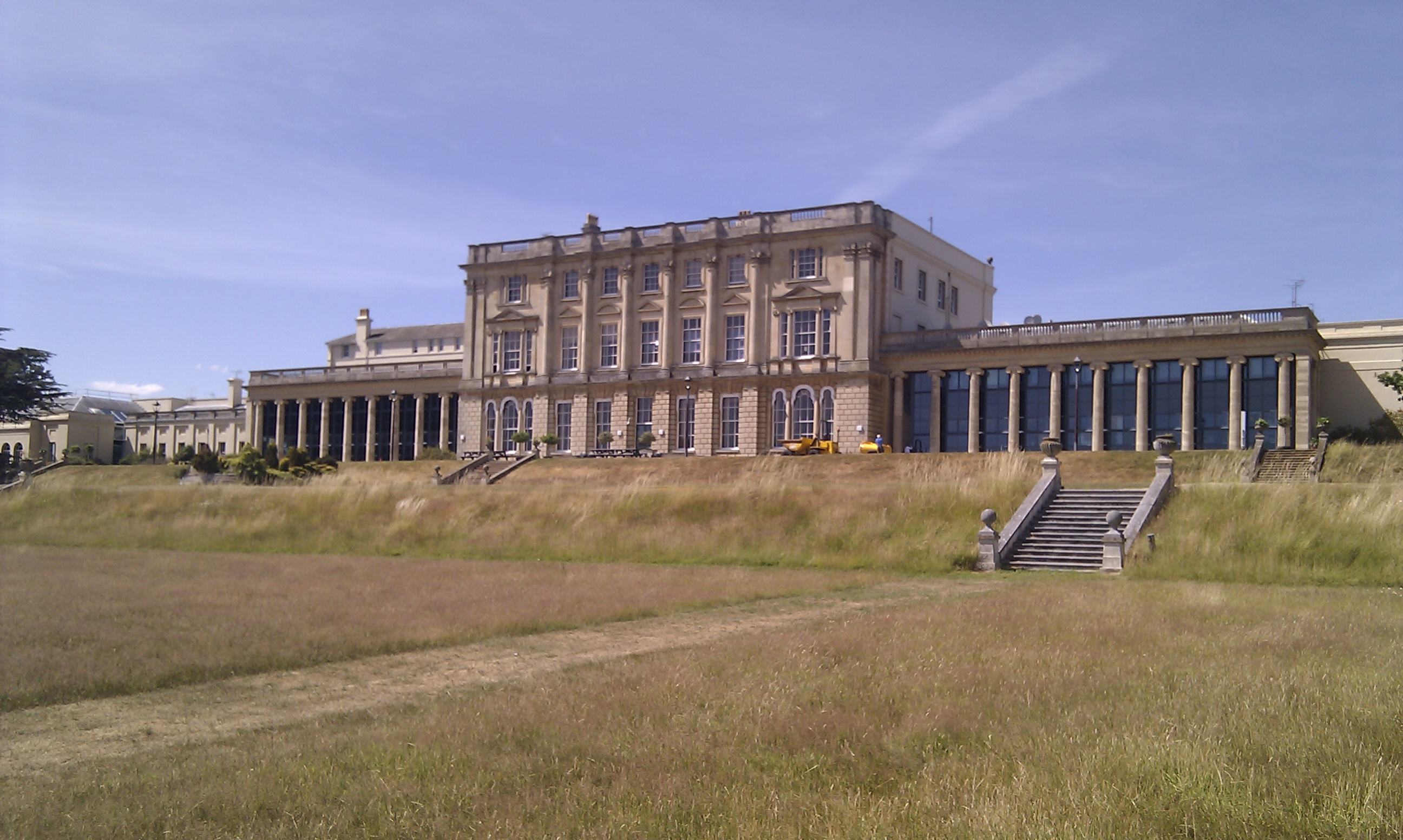
Caversham Park, Berkshire

William inherited both Greys Court and the rebuilt Caversham Park mansion on the death of his father in 1596. He often resided at Caversham, entertaining both Queen Elizabeth I and Queen Anne of Denmark there. He was first married to Dorothy Bray, daughter of Edmund Braye, 1st Baron Braye by his wife Jane Halliwell and widow of Edmund Brydges, 2nd Baron Chandos of Sudeley (died 1573). Dorothy was 20 years his senior, and had at least five children from her first marriage, though their union proved childless.

In the mid-1590s, William took in Mary Fitton, the daughter of a family friend. Intended to be her protector from wayward influence of courtiers, he fell in love with her himself and wished his wife dead so he could marry her. He expressed desire for children with her, and when made godfather to Mary sister's daughter (Anne Newdigate) he named that child Mary. His infatuation with his ward was the cause of much court laughter:

Party Beard, party beard...

...the white hind was crossed:
Brave Pembroke struck her down

And took her from the clown

went one song about him. He was mockingly nicknamed "Party Beard" because his beard was three colours: white at the roots, yellow mid-way and black at the ends. Mary refused him. He courted her even after she had an illegitimate child (who died) with the Earl of Pembroke, but Mary was not interested and after his wife Dorothy died (31 October 1605 at Minty, buried at Rotherfield Greys), he remarried quickly.

In 1603, he was created Baron Knollys. On 23 December 1605, Knollys married Lady Elizabeth Howard (1586–1658), the daughter of Thomas Howard, 1st Earl of Suffolk. In 1616, he was created Viscount Wallingford and in 1626, he was further honoured as Earl of Banbury.

After Knollys' death, Elizabeth remarried to Edward Vaux, 4th Baron Vaux of Harrowden. There is some debate as to whether Elizabeth's two sons, Edward (1627–1645) and Nicholas (1631–1674) (titular 2nd and 3rd Earls respectively), were William's offspring, as her first son was born when William was 80 years old and after more than 20 years of marriage. As a result, the House of Lords refused to seat them as Earls of Banbury and considered them to be illegitimate sons of Elizabeth and Edward Vaux.

Knollys is believed to be the inspiration for the character of Malvolio in Shakespeare's Twelfth Night.

== Ancestry ==
Ancestors of William Knollys, 1st Earl of Banbury

Sir Richard Knollys
Robert Knollys
Margaret D'Oyley
Sir Robert Knollys
Sir John Troutbeck
Elizabeth Troutbeck
Margaret Hulse
Sir Francis Knollys
Sir Richard Penystone
Sir Thomas Penystone
Margaret Herris
Lettice Penystone
Richard Bulstrode
Alice Bulstrode
Alice Knyffe
William Knollys
Sir William Carey
Sir Thomas Carey
Alice Furford
Sir William Carey
Sir Robert Spencer
Margaret Spencer
Eleanor Beaufort
Catherine Carey
William Boleyn
Thomas Boleyn, 1st Earl of Wiltshire
Lady Margaret Butler
Mary Boleyn
Thomas Howard, 2nd Duke of Norfolk
Lady Elizabeth Howard
Elizabeth Tilney

== Footnotes ==
Political offices
| Preceded by William Paget | Comptroller of the Household; 1596–1600 | Succeeded by Henry Vane the Elder |
| Preceded by Sir Francis Knollys and The Lord Norreys | Lord Lieutenant of Berkshire; 1596–1632 joint with The Lord Norreys 1596–1601, The Earl of Holland 1628–1632 | Succeeded by The Earl of Holland |
| Preceded by Sir Francis Knollys and The Lord Norreys | Lord Lieutenant of Oxfordshire; 1596–1632 joint with The Lord Norreys 1596–1601, The Earl of Berkshire 1628–1632 | Succeeded by The Earl of Berkshire |
| Preceded by Sir Francis Knollys | Custos Rotulorum of Oxfordshire bef. 1594–1632 | Succeeded by The Earl of Berkshire |
| Preceded by The Lord North | Treasurer of the Household; 1601–1616 | Succeeded by The Lord Wotton |
Peerage of England
| New creation | Earl of Banbury; 1626–1632 | Succeeded by Edward Knollys (Title disallowed) |
