= John Hastings (MP) =

English politician

John Hastings (c. 1525 – c. 1585) was an English politician.

Hastings was MP for Leicester in 1559, Bridport in 1563, Reading in 1571, and Poole in 1572.
