= John Callis (pirate) =

Welsh pirate

- Born: Wales
- Died: 1576; Newport
- Piratical career
- Type: Pirate
- Years active: 1570s
- Rank: Captain
- Base of operations: South Wales
- Commands: the Swallow

John Callis (or Calles) (died 1576) was a 16th-century Welsh pirate. He was active in South Wales from Cardiff to Haverfordwest, often selling his prizes and cargo in the villages of Laugharne and Carew in Milford Haven, only a few miles south of Little Newcastle, Wales. His piratical career lasted for decades before pressure from neighbouring countries forced the government of England to take action and managed to capture him in 1576.

The elderly pirate attempted to assist authorities in tracking down other pirates in exchange for his release, however the authorities refused his offer and he was hanged in Newport later that year. Following his execution, a commission was appointed to investigate merchants and others in the counties of Cardigan, Pembroke, Carmarthen, Monmouth and Glamorgan associated with locally based pirates. A list of those illegally dealing with pirates was compiled by the commission and the offenders fined.
