= Catherine Carey =

English noblewoman and courtier (c. 1524–1569)

- Lady Knollys
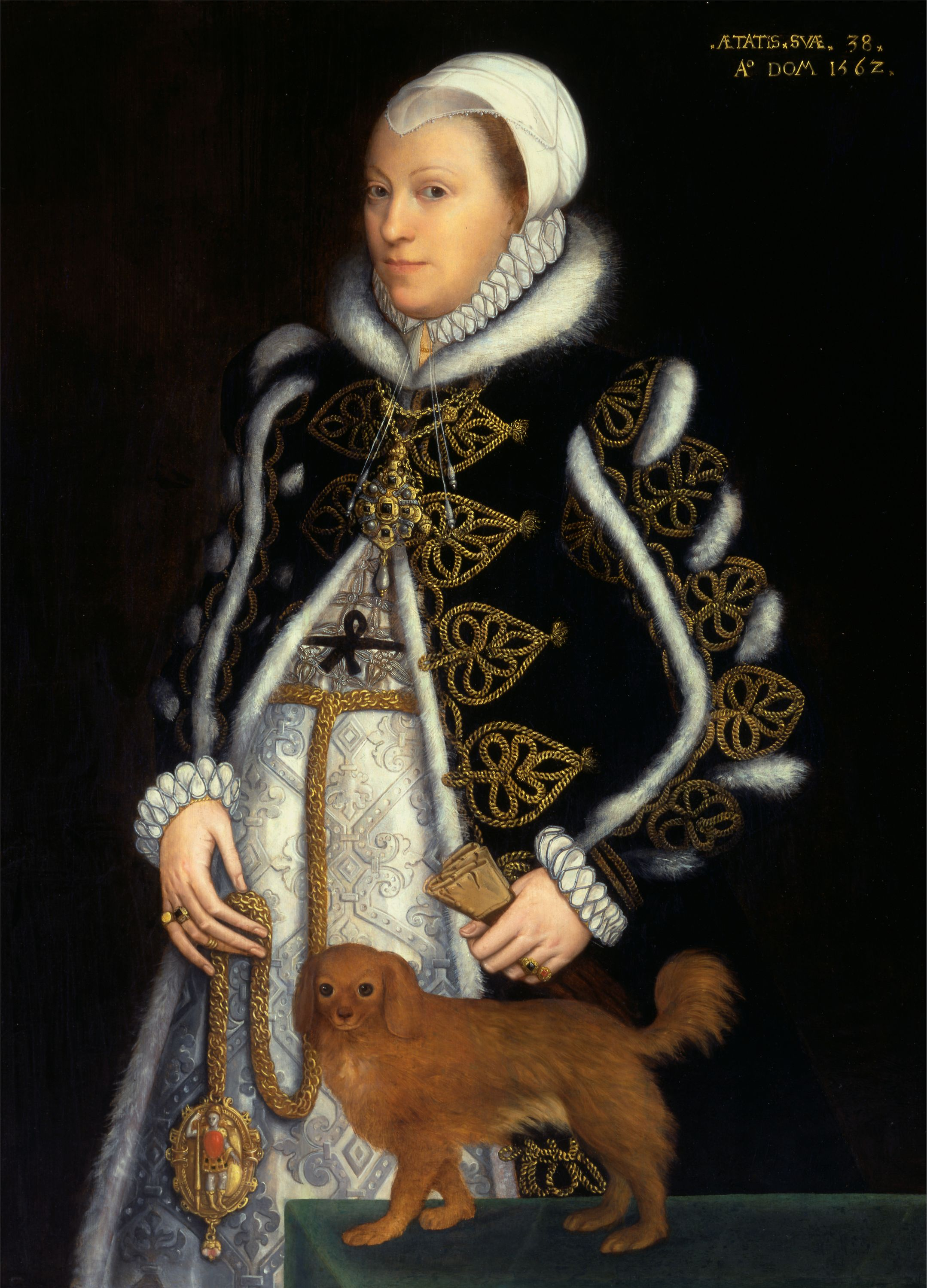
- Portrait often identified as Catherine, 1562
- Born: c. 1524; England
- Died: 15 January 1569 (aged 44–45); Hampton Court Palace, England
- Buried: St Edmund's Chapel, Westminster Abbey, England
- Spouse: Sir Francis Knollys
- Issue: Mary Stalker; Sir Henry Knollys; Lettice Knollys, Countess of Essex; William Knollys, 1st Earl of Banbury; Edward Knollys, MP; Sir Robert Knollys, MP; Richard Knollys, MP; Elizabeth Leighton, Lady Leighton; Sir Thomas Knollys; Sir Francis Knollys, MP; Anne West, Lady De La Warr; Catherine, Baroness Offaly, Lady Butler; Maud Knollys; Abigail Knollys; Dudley Knollys
- Father: William Carey or Henry VIII
- Mother: Mary Boleyn

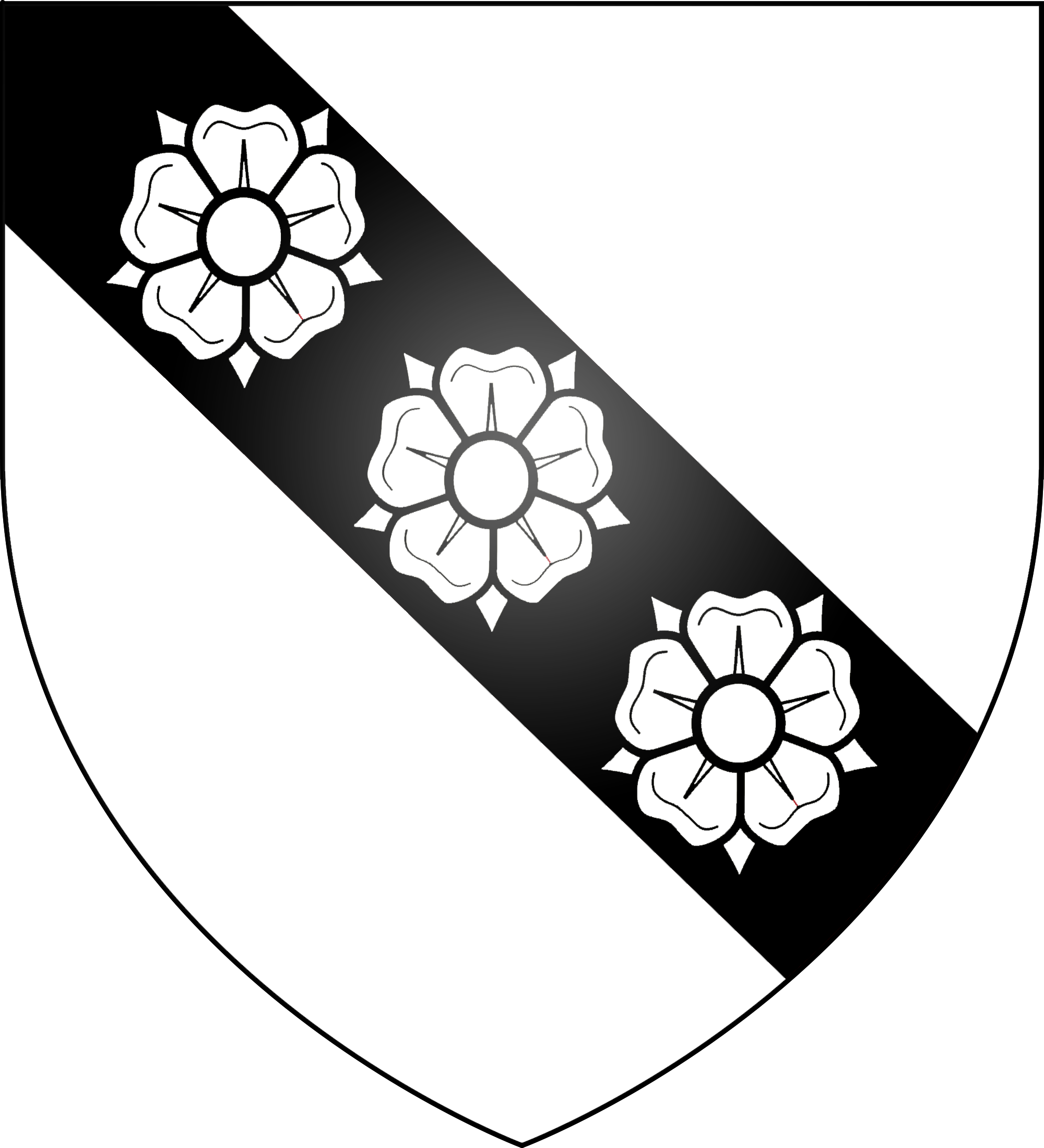
Arms of Carey: Argent, on a bend sable three roses of the field

Catherine Carey, after her marriage Catherine Knollys and later known as both Lady Knollys and Dame Catherine Knollys (c. 1524 – 15 January 1569), was a Lady of the Bedchamber to Queen Elizabeth I, who was her first cousin. She was the daughter of Mary Boleyn, sister to queen consort Anne Boleyn. She and her brother Henry Carey, 1st Baron Hunsdon, were rumoured to be illegitimate children of Henry VIII.

== Biography ==
Catherine Carey was born in 1524, the daughter of William Carey of Aldenham in Hertfordshire, Gentleman of the Privy Chamber and Esquire of the Body to Henry VIII, and his wife Mary Boleyn, who had once been a mistress of the king. Catherine was thus Elizabeth I's maternal first cousin. Some historians believe that Catherine was an illegitimate child of Henry VIII, which would make her also Elizabeth I's paternal half-sister through their shared father, Henry VIII. However, Henry VIII never acknowledged Catherine as his daughter. Other historians suggest that this was a rumour spread by supporters of Katherine of Aragon.

Catherine was said to be a witness to the execution of her aunt, Anne Boleyn, in 1536; however, claims that she had stayed overnight to entertain and distract her aunt Anne in the Tower of London before the latter's execution have been dismissed.

Catherine went on to be appointed Maid of Honour to both Anne of Cleves, in November 1539, and Katherine Howard, who were the fourth and fifth wives of Henry VIII.

On 26 April 1540 she married Sir Francis Knollys. Her husband was knighted in 1547 and was named a Knight of the Garter in 1593. He was also Treasurer of the Royal Household. From the time of her marriage, Catherine became known as Mistress Knollys, and from 1547 as Lady Knollys. When not in London, the couple lived at Reading in Berkshire and Rotherfield Greys in Oxfordshire.

As Catherine and her husband were staunch Protestants, they fled to Germany in spring 1556 during the reign of Queen Mary I. Princess Elizabeth wrote to her cousin whilst she lived on the continent, and Catherine is known to have resided in Basel and Frankfurt am Main whilst on the continent.

Catherine was appointed Chief Lady of the Bedchamber after Elizabeth became queen. For the first ten years of the reign, Lady Catherine combined the most senior post among the ladies-in-waiting with motherhood to more than a dozen children. Elizabeth never recognized Catherine as her half-sister, and it was certainly not a relationship that Catherine or Sir Francis ever openly claimed. At court, Catherine was acknowledged as the queen's favourite among her first cousins, and Elizabeth's lack of other female relatives to whom she felt close may be adequate to explain this favoured position.

She died on 15 January 1569 at Hampton Court Palace, being outlived by her husband and children. At the time of her death, her husband was in charge of the imprisoned Mary Queen of Scots.

Catherine was buried the following April in St Edmund's Chapel in Westminster Abbey, with the grieving Queen herself paying £640 2s. 11d. for the interment. There is a small commemorative plaque in the abbey, although her chief monument is at Rotherfield Greys in Oxfordshire.

Grave monument of Catherine Carey, lady Knollys in St Nicholas Church, Rotherfield Greys.

Catherine's epitaph reads:

The Right Honourable Lady Catherine Knollys, chief Lady of the Queen's Majesty's Bedchamber, and Wife to Sir Francis Knollys, Knight, Treasurer of Her Highnesses Houshold, departed this Life the Fifteenth of January, 1568, at Hampton-Court, and was honourably buried in the Floor of this Chapel. This Lady Knollys, and the Lord Hunsdon her Brother, were the Children of William Caree, Esq; and of the Lady Mary his Wife, one of the Daughters and Heirs to Thomas Bulleyne, Earl of Wiltshire and Ormonde; which Lady Mary was Sister to Anne Queen of England, Wife to K. Henry the Eighth, Father and Mother to Elizabeth Queen of England.

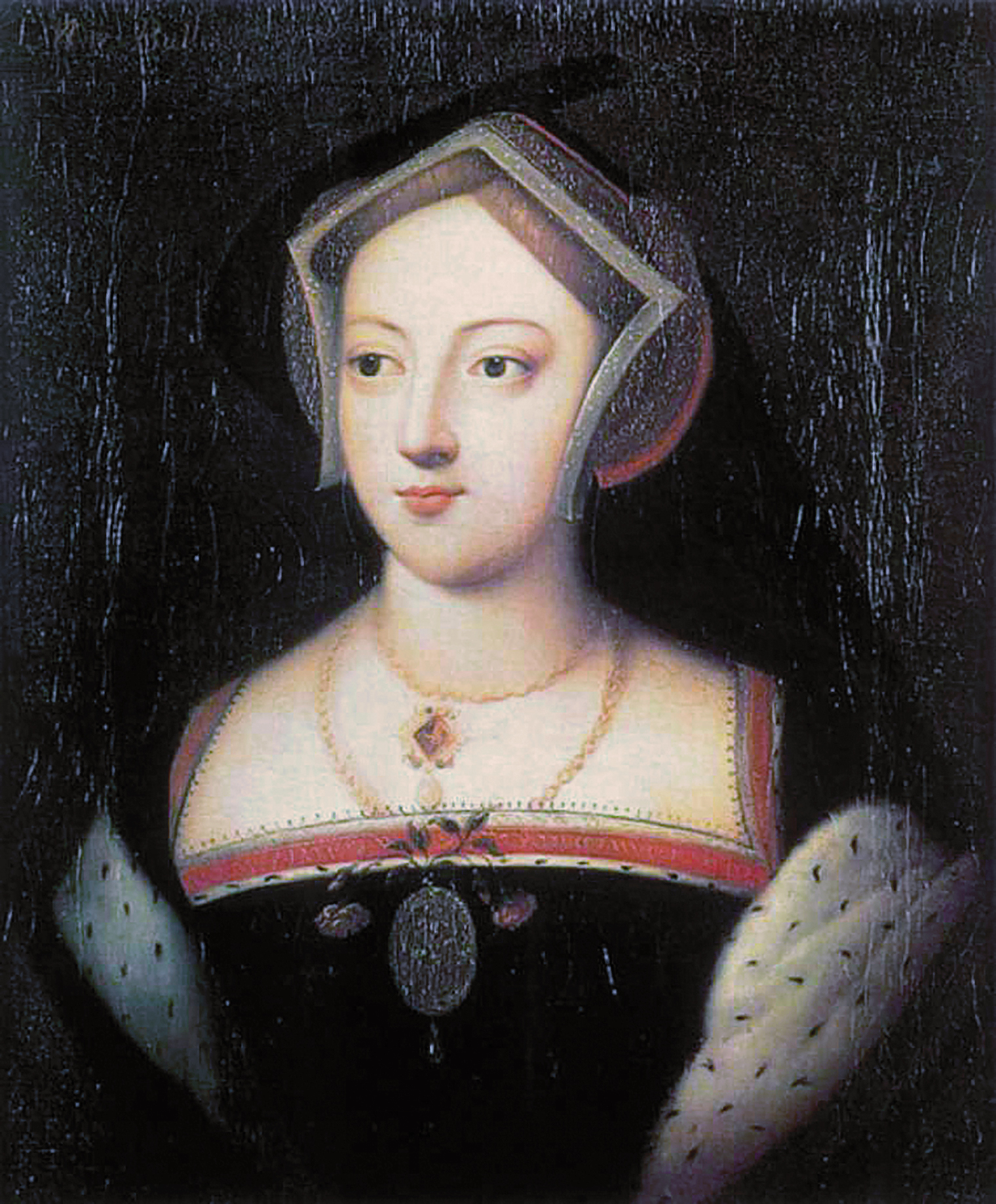
Catherine's mother, Mary Boleyn, was the sister of Anne Boleyn and a mistress of King Henry VIII of England

== Issue ==
Sir Francis and Lady Knollys produced sixteen children:

- Mary Knollys (c. 1541 – 1593). She married Edward Stalker.
- Sir Henry Knollys (c. 1542 – 1582). He was a member of parliament representing first Shoreham, Kent (1563) and then Oxfordshire. Esquire of the Body to Elizabeth I. He was married to Margaret Cave (1549–1600), daughter of Sir Ambrose Cave and Margaret Willington. Their daughter Lettice Knollys (1583–1655) married before 19 June 1602 William Paget, 4th Baron Paget.
- Lettice Knollys, Countess of Essex and of Leicester (8 November 1543 – 25 December 1634). She married first Walter Devereux, 1st Earl of Essex, secondly Robert Dudley, 1st Earl of Leicester, and thirdly Sir Christopher Blount.
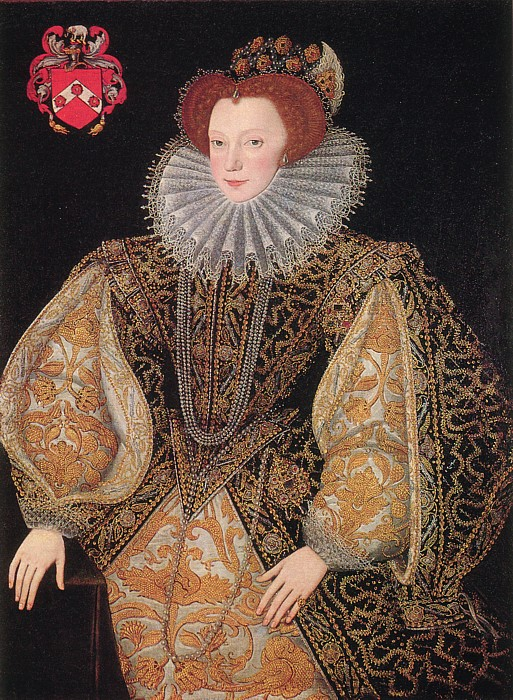
  Lettice Knollys, Catherine's daughter
- William Knollys, 1st Earl of Banbury, (c. 1544 – 25 May 1632). He was married first to Dorothy Bray, who was 20 years his senior; and secondly to Elizabeth Howard, daughter of Thomas Howard, 1st Earl of Suffolk and his second wife Catherine Knyvett.
- Edward Knollys (1546–1580). He was a member of Parliament.
- Sir Robert Knollys (1547–1626). Member of Parliament representing Reading, Berkshire (1572–1589), Brecknockshire (1589–1604), Abingdon, Oxfordshire (1604, 1624–1625) and finally Berkshire (1626). He married Catherine Vaughan, daughter of Sir Rowland Vaughan, of Porthamel.
- Maud Knollys (ca 1548) died young
- Elizabeth Knollys (15 June 1549 – c. 1605). Lady Elizabeth married Sir Thomas Leighton of Feckenham, Worcestershire, son of John Leighton of Watlesburgh and Joyce Sutton, in 1578. Her husband served as Governor of Jersey and Guernsey.
- Sir Thomas Knollys (died 1596). Known for service in the Eighty Years' War (1568–1648). Governor of Ostend in 1586. Married Ottilia de Merode, daughter of Jean IX de Merode, Sire de Petershem and Margareta van Pallant.
- Sir Francis Knollys "the Younger" (ca 1550 – 1648). Member of Parliament representing first Oxford (1572–1588) and then Berkshire (1597, 1625). Married Lettice Barrett, daughter of John Barrett, of Hanham. Father-in-law of John Hampden.
- Richard Knollys (ca 1552 – 21 August 1596). Member of Parliament representing first Wallingford (1584) and then Northampton (1588). Married Joan Heigham, daughter of John Heigham, of Gifford's Hall, Wickhambrook, Suffolk.
- Anne Knollys (19 July 1555 – 30 August 1608). Married Thomas West, 2nd Baron De La Warr. Mother to Thomas West, 3rd Baron De La Warr, after whom the state of Delaware is named.
- Catherine Knollys (21 October 1559 – 20 December 1620). Married first Gerald FitzGerald, Baron Offaly (son of Gerald FitzGerald, 11th Earl of Kildare and Mabel Browne) and secondly Sir Phillip Butler, of Watton Woodhall. She was the mother of Lettice Digby, 1st Baroness Offaly.
- Dudley Knollys (ca 1562 – June 1562)

== In literature ==
The possibility that Catherine, and perhaps her brother Henry, were illegitimate children of Henry VIII, appears in many works of fiction, including Wendy J. Dunn's The Light in the Labyrinth and Philippa Gregory's The Other Boleyn Girl. Carey is also a character in Gregory's The Boleyn Inheritance, where she is sent to the royal court during the time of Queens Anne of Cleves and Katherine Howard, and in The Virgin's Lover, where, as the mother of the seventeen-year-old Lettice Knollys, she is among Elizabeth I's closest companions. In Henry VIII's Wives by Alison Prince, the book's narrator has a friend, Catherine "Kitty" Carey, whose father died of sweating sickness and whose mother is Mary Boleyn. In this book, Catherine was thought to be the king's daughter. Catherine is the featured subject in the novel Cor Rotto: A Novel of Catherine Carey by Adrienne Dillard and in The Lady Carey by Anne R. Bailey.

Catherine is the central character in The Boleyn Secret by Alison Weir.

== Sources ==
- Guillim, John; Kent, Samuel (1726). The Banner Display'd: or, An Abridgment of Guillim: Being a Compleat System of Heraldry, in all its Parts ... Vol. I. By Samuel Kent. London: Printed for Thomas Cox.
- Ives, Eric (2005). The Life and Death of Anne Boleyn: 'The Most Happy'. Oxford: Blackwell Publishing. ISBN 9781405134637.
- Lee, Sidney (1892). "Knollys, Francis" . In Lee, Sidney (ed.). Dictionary of National Biography. Vol. 31. London: Smith, Elder & Co. pp. 275–279.
- Prince, Alison (2011). Henry VIII's Wives. London: Scholastic. ISBN 9781407117355.
- Varlow, Sally (August 2007). "Sir Francis Knollys's Latin Dictionary: New evidence for Katherine Carey". Historical Research. 80 (209): 315–323. doi:10.1111/j.1468-2281.2007.00400.x.
- Weir, Alison (2011). The Lady in the Tower: The Fall of Anne Boleyn. Queen of England Series. London: Vintage. ISBN 9780712640176.
- Weir, Alison (2011). The Six Wives of Henry VIII. New York: Random House. ISBN 9781446449097.
- Weir, Alison (2012). Mary Boleyn: 'The Great and Infamous Whore'. London: Vintage. ISBN 9780099546481.
