= Ambrose Cave =

16th-century English politician

Sir Ambrose Cave (died 2 April 1568) was an English politician and Chancellor of the Duchy of Lancaster.

== Life ==
Ambrose Cave was the son of Richard Cave (see Cave-Browne-Cave baronets) and Margaret Saxby of Stanford, Northamptonshire. He was educated at Cambridge University. He was knighted by 1525. He was a Member of Parliament for Leicestershire in 1545, 1547 and 1553 and for Warwickshire in 1558, 1559 and 1563 and High Sheriff of Warwickshire in 1549. He was also Chancellor of the Duchy of Lancaster (1558–1569) and Custos Rotulorum of Warwickshire (also 1558–1568).

As Chancellor of the Duchy of Lancaster, Cave inspected the castles and estates in the north of England in 1562. A committee viewed reports and drawings of the castles. Although the buildings were mostly redundant, only Peveril Castle and Donington were declared beyond repair. Tickhill Castle was to be retained as an "ancient monument".

== Marriage and family ==
Cave married Margery Willington, daughter of William Willington. Their daughter Margaret married Sir Henry Knollys, privateer and MP. His nephew Roger Cave married Margaret, a sister of William Cecil, 1st Baron Burghley.

Honorary titles
Preceded by Sir George Throckmorton	Custos Rotulorum of Warwickshire bef. 1558 – 1568	Succeeded by Robert Dudley, 1st Earl of Leicester
Political offices
Preceded by Sir Edward Waldegrave	Chancellor of the Duchy of Lancaster; 1559–1568	Succeeded by Sir Ralph Sadler
