= Mary Boleyn =

English noblewoman and courtier (1499–1543)

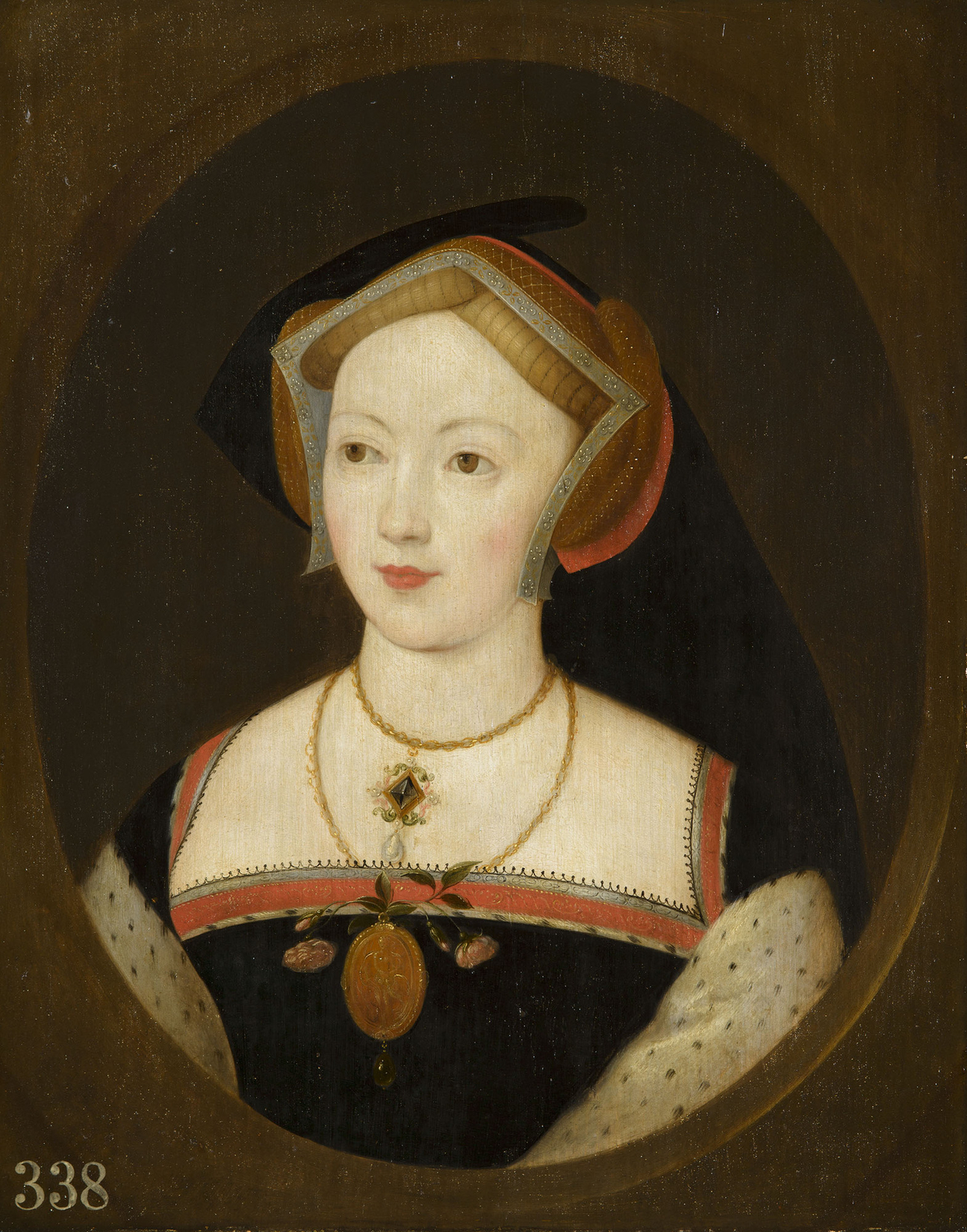
- 17th-century copy of a lost original portrait by Remigius van Leemput
- Known for: Mistress of Henry VIII and sister to Queen Anne Boleyn
- Born: c. 1499; Probably Blickling Hall, Norfolk, England
- Died: 19 or 30 July 1543 (aged 43–44); Rochford Hall, Essex, England
- Buried: Unknown although assumed to be buried at Hever Castle
- Noble family: Boleyn
- Spouses: William Carey (m. 1520; died 1528) William Stafford (m. 1534)
- Issue: Catherine Carey, Lady Knollys; Henry Carey, 1st Baron Hunsdon; Edward Stafford (disputed); Anne Stafford (disputed)
- Father: Thomas Boleyn, 1st Earl of Wiltshire
- Mother: Elizabeth Howard

Mary Boleyn (c. 1499 – 19 or 30 July 1543), also known as Lady Mary, was an English noblewoman and courtier. She was the sister of English queen consort Anne Boleyn, whose family enjoyed considerable influence during the reign of King Henry VIII.

Mary was one of the mistresses of Henry VIII for an unknown period. It has been rumoured that she bore two of the King's children, though Henry did not acknowledge either. Mary was also rumoured to have been a mistress of Henry VIII's rival, King Francis I of France, for some period between 1515 and 1519.

Mary Boleyn was married twice: in 1520 to William Carey and again, secretly, in 1534, to William Stafford, a soldier from a good family but with few prospects. This secret marriage to a man considered beneath her station angered King Henry VIII and her sister, Queen Anne, and resulted in Mary's banishment from the royal court. She died seven years later, having spent the remainder of her life in obscurity.

== Early life ==
Mary was probably born at Blickling Hall, the family seat in Norfolk, and grew up at Hever Castle, Kent. She was the daughter of a wealthy diplomat and courtier, Thomas Boleyn, later Earl of Wiltshire, by his marriage to Elizabeth Howard, the eldest daughter of Thomas Howard, then Earl of Surrey and future 2nd Duke of Norfolk, and his first wife, Elizabeth Tilney. Therefore on her maternal side Mary was the niece of Thomas Howard, 3rd Duke of Norfolk, and first cousin of poet and soldier Lord Henry Howard, styled Earl of Surrey (his courtesy title as heir apparent to the Dukedom of Norfolk), and Lady Mary Howard, wife of Henry VIII's illegitimate son, Henry FitzRoy, Duke of Richmond and Somerset, as well as Henry VIII's future fifth wife, Catherine Howard, daughter of Mary's uncle, Lord Edmund Howard.

There is no evidence of Mary's exact date of birth but it occurred sometime between early 1499 and late 1500. Most historians suggest she was the eldest of the three surviving Boleyn children. Evidence suggests that the Boleyn family treated Mary as the eldest child; in 1597 her grandson George Carey, 2nd Baron Hunsdon claimed the earldom of Ormond on the grounds that he was the Boleyns' legitimate heir. Many ancient peerages can descend through female heirs without an immediate male heir. If Anne had been the elder sister the better claim to the title would have belonged to her daughter, Queen Elizabeth I. However it appears that Queen Elizabeth offered Mary's son, Henry, the earldom as he was dying, although he declined it. If Mary had been the elder Boleyn sister, Henry would have the better claim to the title, regardless of a new grant from the Queen. There is more evidence to suggest that Mary was older than Anne. She was married first, on 4 February 1520; an elder daughter traditionally married before a younger sister. Moreover in 1532, when Anne was created Marchioness of Pembroke, she was referred to as "one of the daughters of Thomas Boleyn". Were she the elder, that status would probably have been mentioned. Most historians now accept Mary as the eldest child, placing her birth sometime in 1499.

During her early years it is most likely that Mary was educated alongside her brother, George and her sister, Anne, at Hever Castle. She was given the conventional education deemed essential for young ladies of her rank and status, which included the basic principles of arithmetic, grammar, history, reading, spelling and writing. In addition to her family genealogy, Mary learned the feminine accomplishments of dancing, embroidery, etiquette, household management, music, needlework, singing and games such as cards and chess. She was also taught archery, falconry, riding and hunting.

Mary remained in England for most of her childhood until she was sent abroad in 1514 around the age of fifteen when her father secured her a place as maid-of-honour to the King's sister, Princess Mary, who was going to Paris to marry King Louis XII of France.

== Royal affair in France ==
Mary was joined in Paris by her father, Sir Thomas, and her sister, Anne, who had been studying in France for the previous year. During this time Mary is supposed to have gained a dubious reputation and embarked on sexual affairs, including one with King Francis I himself, Francis having succeeded Louis XII, who had died shortly after his marriage to Princess Mary. This is based on a secondhand account by Rodolfo Pio da Carpi, Bishop of Faenza and papal nuncio, in 1536, who claimed Francis knew Mary in France as "una grandissima ribalda, infame sopra tutte" ("a very great whore, the most infamous of all").

She returned to England in 1519, where she was appointed a maid-of-honour to Catherine of Aragon, the queen consort of Henry VIII.

== Royal mistress ==
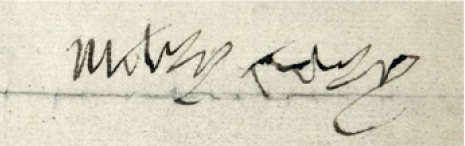
Signature of Mary Boleyn as "Mary Carey" after her marriage to William Carey

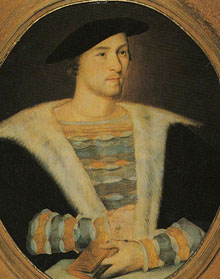
William Carey, husband of Mary Boleyn

Soon after her return Mary was married to William Carey, a wealthy and influential courtier of the privy chamber, on 4 February 1520. Henry VIII was a guest at the couple's wedding. At some point Mary became Henry's mistress; the starting date and duration of the liaison are unknown.

It was rumoured that the King fathered one or both of Mary's children. However even if this were so Henry did not acknowledge either of them as his children, although he had previously acknowledged Henry FitzRoy, his son by another mistress, Elizabeth Blount.

Henry VIII's wife, Catherine of Aragon, had first been married to Henry's older brother, Arthur, when he was a little over fifteen years old, but he died just a few months later. Henry later used this to justify the annulment of his marriage to Catherine, arguing that her marriage to Arthur had created an affinity between Henry and Catherine; as his brother's wife, under canon law, she became his sister. In 1527, during his initial attempts to obtain a papal annulment of his marriage to Catherine, Henry similarly requested a dispensation to marry Anne, the sister of his former mistress.

== Sister's rise to power ==
Anne returned to England in January 1522 and soon joined the royal court as one of Queen Catherine's maids-of-honour. Anne achieved considerable popularity at court, although the sisters moved in different circles and were not considered close.

Although Mary is said to have been more attractive than her sister, Anne seems to have been more ambitious and intelligent. When the King took an interest in Anne she refused to become his mistress. By the middle of 1526 Henry was determined to marry her. This gave him further incentive to seek the annulment of his marriage to Catherine of Aragon. When Mary's husband died during an outbreak of sweating sickness Henry granted Anne Boleyn the wardship of her nephew, Henry Carey. Mary's husband had left her with considerable debts and Anne arranged for her nephew to be educated at a respectable Cistercian monastery. Anne also interceded to secure an annual pension of £100 for her widowed sister.

== Second marriage ==
In October 1532 Mary was one of her companions when Anne accompanied Henry to the English Pale of Calais on his way to a state visit to France. Anne was crowned Queen on 1 June 1533 and on 7 September gave birth to Henry's daughter Elizabeth, who later became Queen Elizabeth I.

In 1534 Mary secretly married an Essex landowner's younger son: William Stafford (later Sir William Stafford). Since Stafford was a soldier, his prospects as a second son so slight and his income so small, many believed that the union was a love match. When Mary became pregnant the marriage was discovered. Queen Anne was furious and the Boleyn family disowned Mary. The couple were banished from court.

Mary's financial circumstances became so desperate that she begged the King's chief adviser, Thomas Cromwell, to speak to Henry and Anne. She admitted that she might have chosen "a greater man of birth" but never one that should have loved her so well, nor a more honest man. And she went on, "I had rather beg my bread with him than to be the greatest queen in Christendom. And I believe verily ... he would not forsake me to be a king." However Henry seems to have been indifferent to her plight. Mary asked Cromwell to speak to her father, her uncle and her brother, but to no avail. Anne relented, sending Mary a magnificent golden cup and some money, but still refused to reinstate her position at court. This partial reconciliation was the closest the two sisters attained; it is not thought that they met after Mary's exile from the King's court.

Mary's life between 1534 and her sister's execution on 19 May 1536 is difficult to trace. There is no record of Mary visiting her siblings, Anne and George, in the Tower of London when they were imprisoned awaiting their executions. Her mother died in April 1538 and was buried in the Howard family mausoleum at the St Mary-at-Lambeth Church, and her father died in March of the following year and was buried at St Peter's Church, Hever, but there is no record either of Mary visiting her parents in the last years of their lives.

Mary died of unknown causes on 19 or 30 July 1543, most likely at Rochford Hall, Essex.

== Issue ==
Mary Boleyn was the mother of:

- Catherine Carey (1524 – 15 January 1569). Maid-of-honour to both Anne of Cleves and Catherine Howard, she married a Puritan, Sir Francis Knollys, Knight of the Garter, by whom she had issue. She later became chief lady of the bedchamber to her cousin, Queen Elizabeth I. One of her daughters, Lettice Knollys, became the second wife of Robert Dudley, 1st Earl of Leicester, the favourite of Elizabeth I.
- Henry Carey, 1st Baron Hunsdon (4 March 1526 – 23 July 1596). Queen Elizabeth I ennobled him shortly after her coronation and later made him a Knight of the Garter. When he was dying, Elizabeth offered Henry the Boleyn family title of Earl of Ormond, which he had long sought, but at that point declined. He was married to Anne Morgan, by whom he had issue.

Mary's marriage to William Stafford (d. 5 May 1556) may have resulted in the birth of two further children:

- Edward Stafford (1535–1545).
- Anne Stafford (b. 1536?), possibly named in honour of Mary's sister, Queen Anne Boleyn.

== Depictions in fiction ==
Mary has been the central character in three novels based on her life:

- Court Cadenza (later published under the title The Tudor Sisters) by Aileen Armitage (Aileen Quigley) (1974)
- The Last Boleyn by Karen Harper (1983)
- The Other Boleyn Girl by Philippa Gregory (2001)

Mary is featured in the following novels:

- Brief Gaudy Hour: A Novel of Anne Boleyn by Margaret Campbell Barnes (1949)
- Anne Boleyn by Evelyn Anthony (1957)
- The Concubine: A Novel Based Upon the Life of Anne Boleyn by Norah Lofts (1963)
- Anne, the Rose of Hever by Maureen Peters (1969)
- Anne Boleyn by Norah Lofts (1979)
- Mistress Anne: The Exceptional Life of Anne Boleyn by Carolly Erickson (1984)
- The Lady in the Tower by Jean Plaidy (1986)
- I, Elizabeth: the Word of a Queen by Rosalind Miles (1994)
- The Secret Diary of Anne Boleyn by Robin Maxwell (1997)
- Dear Heart, How Like You This? by Wendy J. Dunn (2002)
- Doomed Queen Anne by Carolyn Meyer (2002)
- Wolf Hall by Hilary Mantel (2009)
- “The Boleyn Secret” by Alison Weir (2026)

Mary is a character in several films and television series:

- In the film Anne of the Thousand Days (1969), she is played by Valerie Gearon.
- In the BBC television film The Other Boleyn Girl (2003), based on the novel of the same name by Philippa Gregory, she is played by Natascha McElhone.
- In the Showtime television series The Tudors (2007–2010), she is played by Perdita Weeks.
- In the film The Other Boleyn Girl (2008), also based on Gregory's novel, she is played by Scarlett Johansson.
- In the miniseries Wolf Hall (2015), the television adaptation based on Hilary Mantel's novel of the same name, Mary is portrayed by Charity Wakefield.

== Non-fiction ==
Mary is also a central subject in three non-fiction books:

- Mary Boleyn: The Mistress of Kings by Alison Weir (2011)
- The Mistresses of Henry VIII by Kelly Hart (2009)
- Mary Boleyn: The True Story of Henry VIII's Mistress by Josephine Wilkinson (2010)

== Family tree ==
Thomas Boleyn, 1st Earl of Wiltshire	Elizabeth Howard
Mary Boleyn	Anne Boleyn	Henry VIII
Catherine Carey	Henry Carey, 1st Baron Hunsdon	Elizabeth I	Mary I	Edward VI
Lettice Knollys	Catherine Carey
