= Robert Knollys (courtier) =

English courtier

Sir Robert Knollys (or Knolles) (died 1521) was an English courtier in the service and favour of Henry VII and Henry VIII.

== Biography ==
Sir Robert was the son of Robert Knollys and Elizabeth Troutbeck, paternal grandson of Sir Richard Knollys and Margaret D'Oyley, and maternal grandson of Sir John Troutbeck and Margaret Hulse.

In 1488, Knollys was one of Henry VII's henchmen, and late in that year was appointed to wait on ‘the king's dearest son the prince’ (Arthur). He received £5 ‘by way of reward’ for each of the three years 1488 to 1490, and when Henry VII met Archduke Philip in 1500, Knollys accompanied the English king as one of the ushers of the chamber. He continued in the same office under Henry VIII, and received an annuity of £20, on 15 November 1509, and a grant of Upclatford, called Rookes Manor, in Hampshire — part of the confiscated property of Sir Richard Empson — on 10 February 1510/11. On 9 July 1514, the usher and his wife were jointly granted the manor of Rotherfield Greys, near Henley-on-Thames, Oxfordshire, in survivorship, at an annual rental of a red rose at midsummer. The grant was confirmed on 5 January 1517/18 by letters patent for their own lives and that of one successor. Other royal gifts followed.

Robert Knollys died in 1521, and was buried in the church of St Helen's Bishopsgate. His will, dated 13 November 1520, was proved 19 June 1521. His widow, Letitia or Lettice, was daughter of Sir Thomas Penyston or Penystone, of Hawridge and Marsworth, both in Buckinghamshire, and Alice Bulstrode, and granddaughter of Sir Richard Penystone and Margaret Herris, and Richard Bulstrode and Alice Knyffe. After Robert Knollys's death, she became the second wife of Sir Robert Lee, of Burston, Buckinghamshire, son of Richard Lee (died c.1500) and Joan Saunders (d.1516). Sir Robert Lee, by whom she had issue, died in 1539, when she became the second wife of Sir Thomas Tresham of Rushton, Northamptonshire, prior (under Queen Mary of England) of the Knights of St. John of Jerusalem. Her will, dated 28 June 1557, was proved 11 June 1558.

Robert Knollys's children included Francis Knollys, a son Henry and two daughters, Mary and Jane. The latter married Sir Charles Wingfield of Kimbolton Castle. The son Henry (died 1583) was in some favour with Edward VI and Elizabeth I. He went abroad with his brother Francis during Queen Mary of England's reign. In 1562 he was sent on a diplomatic mission to Germany, to observe the temper of German Protestants, and in 1569 was temporarily employed in warding both Mary, Queen of Scots, at Tutbury and the Duke of Norfolk in the Tower. He was M.P. for Reading in 1563, and for Christchurch in 1572. His will, dated 27 July 1582, was proved 2 September 1583.

== Ancestry ==
Ancestors of Robert Knollys (courtier)

4. Sir Richard Knollys
2. Robert Knollys
5. Margaret d'Oyley
1. Sir Robert Knollys
6. Sir John Troutbeck
3. Elizabeth Troutbeck
7. Margaret Hulse

== See also ==
- Knollys (family)

== Notes ==
- This article incorporates text from a publication now in the public domain: "Knollys, Francis". Dictionary of National Biography. London: Smith, Elder & Co. 1885–1900.
