= Dorothy Percy, Countess of Northumberland =

English noble

Dorothy Devereux
- Countess of Northumberland
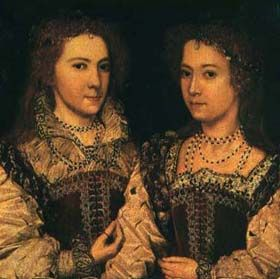
- Portrait identified as Dorothy Devereux (on the left) and her elder sister Penelope Devereux, c.1581
- Born: c.1564 Chartley Castle, Staffordshire, England
- Died: 3 August 1619 (aged 54–55)
- Spouses: Sir Thomas Perrot; Henry Percy, 9th Earl of Northumberland
- Issue: Penelope Perrot; Dorothy Perrot; Elizabeth Perrot; Dorothy Percy; Lucy Percy; Algernon Percy, 10th Earl of Northumberland; Henry Percy, Lord of Alnwick
- Father: Walter Devereux, 1st Earl of Essex
- Mother: Lettice Knollys

Dorothy Percy, Countess of Northumberland (formerly Perrot, née Devereux; 1565 – 3 August 1619) was the younger daughter of Walter Devereux, 1st Earl of Essex by Lettice Knollys, and the wife of Henry Percy, 9th Earl of Northumberland. Lady Dorothy Percy (née Devereux; c. 1564–1619) was an English noblewoman and Countess of Northumberland, known as the wife of the 9th Earl, Henry Percy. Daughter of Walter Devereux, 1st Earl of Essex, she navigated high-stakes Elizabethan politics, managed estate affairs during her husband's long imprisonment for the Gunpowder Plot, and was a prominent, loyal, yet strong-willed figure. Lady Dorothy is often remembered for her sharp intellect and resilience, managing to navigate the dangerous political landscape of the late Elizabethan and early Jacobean eras while securing her children's futures. Her portrait and the history of her family, including her famous brother's downfall, highlight the precarious nature of noble life at that time.

== Family ==
Dorothy was born in September 1565, the daughter of Walter Devereux, 1st Earl of Essex and Lettice Knollys, a lady-in-waiting of Queen Elizabeth I of England. Her paternal grandparents were Sir Richard Devereux and Dorothy Hastings, after whom she was named. Her maternal grandparents were Sir Francis Knollys and Lady Catherine Carey, the daughter of Mary Boleyn, herself the sister of Queen consort Anne Boleyn. Dorothy had an elder sister Penelope Devereux, who was said to have been the inspiration for Sir Philip Sidney's sonnet sequence Astrophel and Stella. She had three younger brothers, Robert Devereux, 2nd Earl of Essex, Walter Devereux (died 1591) and Francis Devereux (died in infancy).

In September 1576, Dorothy's father died in Dublin, Ireland, of dysentery. Two years later, her mother married secondly and in secret, Queen Elizabeth's favourite Robert Dudley, Earl of Leicester, thus earning the wrath of the queen, who promptly banished her from court. The marriage produced one son Robert, Baron Denbigh who was born in 1581. The boy died at the age of three. In 1589, eleven months after Leicester's death, Dorothy acquired another stepfather, Sir Christopher Blount, who was thirteen years younger than her mother. On 25 February 1601, her brother Robert, 2nd Earl of Essex was beheaded at the Tower of London for treason. Unlike their sister Penelope and step-father, Dorothy was not suspected of playing any role in the rebellion. Essex denounced Penelope as a traitor, an act which shocked many, but did not accuse Dorothy.

== Marriage and children ==
In July 1583 at Broxbourne Hertfordshire, where she was staying with Sir Henry Cocke, Dorothy married Sir Thomas Perrot of Haroldston. They married by licence, without the required approval of her family and the queen as she was still a minor.

The marriage gave great offence to the Queen, whose consent should have been asked, but would almost certainly have been refused. She distrusted Sir John Perrot, who was to end his life as a convicted traitor under sentence of death in the Tower of London, and detested Dorothy's mother Lettice, whom she blamed for arranging the marriage. Thomas was imprisoned for a time and Dorothy was banished from Court. In 1587 Essex used his growing influence with the Queen in an attempt to restore his sister to favour, but due to the malicious interference of Sir Walter Raleigh, the result was another furious quarrel, ending with Essex and Dorothy leaving the house they were all staying in at midnight. Only after Perrot's death did the Queen consent to receive Dorothy at Court again, and she became something of a royal favourite.

Their only surviving child when Thomas died in 1594 was

- Penelope Perrot, who married firstly the astronomer Sir William Lower (c.1570–1615), by whom she had three sons and a daughter, and secondly Sir Robert Naunton, by whom she had a daughter Penelope, who married Philip Herbert, 5th Earl of Pembroke.

It was claimed in Sir Robert Naunton's Fragmenta Regalia that Dorothy's father-in-law, Sir John Perrot, was an illegitimate son of Henry VIII by his alleged mistress Mary Berkeley. Modern historians generally reject this theory.

Shortly after her first husband's death in 1594, Dorothy married Henry Percy, 9th Earl of Northumberland, known as "The Wizard Earl". It has been suggested that the queen engineered the marriage to prevent the earl marrying Lady Arbella Stuart, but it is likely that it was intended to cement a political union between Dorothy’s brother and the earl. The subsequent falling out of the two men caused problems for Dorothy and in 1599 she separated from her husband and moved to Essex House. In 1605, the earl was sent to the Tower of London on suspicion of involvement in the Gunpowder Plot, and he was not freed until after his wife's death. During his imprisonment, Dorothy made multiple unsuccessful appeals to the King and influential courtiers to free her husband, but continued to attend the Queen's court, sometimes accompanied by her daughters.

They had four children:

- Dorothy (c.1598- 20 August 1659), married Robert Sidney, 2nd Earl of Leicester, by whom she had six children.
- Lucy (1599–1600- 5 November 1660), married as his second wife James Hay, 1st Earl of Carlisle.
- Algernon (29 September 1602 – 13 October 1668), married firstly, Anne Cecil, by whom he had five daughters, including Lady Elizabeth Percy, Countess of Essex; he married secondly, Lady Elizabeth Howard, by whom he had his heir, Joceline Percy, 11th Earl of Northumberland.
- Henry Percy, Lord of Alnwick (1604- April 1659), died unmarried.

== In fiction ==
A sole novel, Beryl Walthew's 1979 Sister to Essex, features Dorothy Devereux as the protagonist. It tells the story of her two marriages—one for love, the other for money—and that of the more famous members of the Devereux family: her mother, Lettice, her sister, Penelope, and her brother, Robert, 2nd Earl of Essex. Most events are described second-hand as Dorothy is seldom present at key moments.

Dorothy is a minor character in the historical novel The Grove of Eagles by Winston Graham. The narrator describes how her second husband, Northumberland, used their marriage to heal the old quarrel between his wife and his close friend Sir Walter Raleigh (who some years earlier had ruined an attempt by Dorothy to regain the Queen's favour), with the further aim of arranging a reconciliation between Raleigh and Dorothy's brother Essex.
