= Mary Gunter =

- Born: 1586
- Died: February 6, 1622 (aged 35–36)
- Occupation: servant
- Employer: Countess of Leicester
- Known for: a recorded conversion of a Catholic
- Spouse: Humphrey Gunter
- Children: 1

Mary Gunter born Mary Cresswell (1586–1622) was an English Catholic ward and servant who became a celebrated convert to Protestantism. She had become the ward of a man who was executed for his part in a rebellion and was then adopted by his widow. She was subjected to a rigorous conversion after she planned to be a nun. Her husband later published the sermon of her funeral and her biography which went to three editions and it was reprinted as that of an "eminent person" sixty years later.

== Early life ==
Mary was born in 1586 and her father was a gentleman named Thomas Cresswell, probably of Odiham in Hampshire. She was said to be a kinswomen of Sir Christopher Blount and Blount was known to Queen Elizabeth because he was the third husband of Lettice Dudley. Lettice Dudley was hated by the Queen and banned from her court because she had married the Queen's suitor the Earl of Leicester.

When she was fourteen her guardian died and she was taken in by Sir Christopher Blount. Blount was executed in March 1601 for his part in the Essex Rebellion five weeks before. However she was still welcome as his kinswoman and she was looked after by the Countess of Leicester, Lettice Dudley.

== Conversion ==
The countess was alarmed to find that Gunter was intending to join the many English Catholic women who were leaving for what is now Belgium to become nuns in English-founded convents. The countess and her chaplain, John Wilson (or John White), decided to intercede. Her Catholic books, images and rosary were taken from her and she was obliged to attend Protestant services for a year. At the end of this John White/Wilson converted her to the Protestant faith. She later questioned God's existence under what could later be called brainwashing and she thought her soul was imperilled for attending Protestant services whilst still considering herself a Catholic. She was thought at one time to be suicidal, but in time she retained her well-being and she would remain a very enthusiastic Protestant reading the bible through every year.

== Marriage and biography ==
Mary was "in service" with the countess for over twenty years. In time she was married to another of the countesses' servants, Humphrey Gunter of Fawley in Berkshire. She would die a year later on 6 February 1622. She was buried at Fawley where her husband had a brass plate featuring her likeness installed to her memory in the parish church. It may still be seen there today. Her funeral service was conducted by Thomas Taylor who did not make a eulogy. After her burial her husband obtained permission from the minister to publish his sermon and her husband attached to it her biography in 1622. The book, Pilgrim's Profession, was dedicated to the Countess and it was reprinted three times up to 1633. In 1683 her biography was included by Samuel Clarke in his The Lives of Sundry Eminent Persons in this Later Age.
