= Robert Wright (courtier) =

English tutor and scholar

Robert Wright (1553?–1596?) matriculated at Cambridge as a sizar of Trinity College on 2 May 1567, and became a scholar there. In 1570–71 he graduated B.A. (M.A. 1574), and was elected a Fellow. He was incorporated M.A. of Oxford on 9 July 1577.

Wright was appointed tutor of Robert Devereux, 2nd Earl of Essex, before the earl went to Cambridge, and accompanied him there. After Essex left the university, Wright became head of his household. When Essex was made the Queen's Master of the Horse, Wright was appointed clerk of the stables.

Wright was a man of learning, and Thomas Newton (1542?–1607) complimented him on his many accomplishments in an epigram addressed "Ad eruditiss. virum Robertum Wrightum, nobiliss. Essexiæ comitis famulum primarium". Latin verses prefixed to Peter Baro's Prælectiones in Jonam (1579) are also assigned to Wright. He died about 1596.
