= Essex House (London) =

House in London, England

Coordinates: 51°30′48″N 0°6′43″W

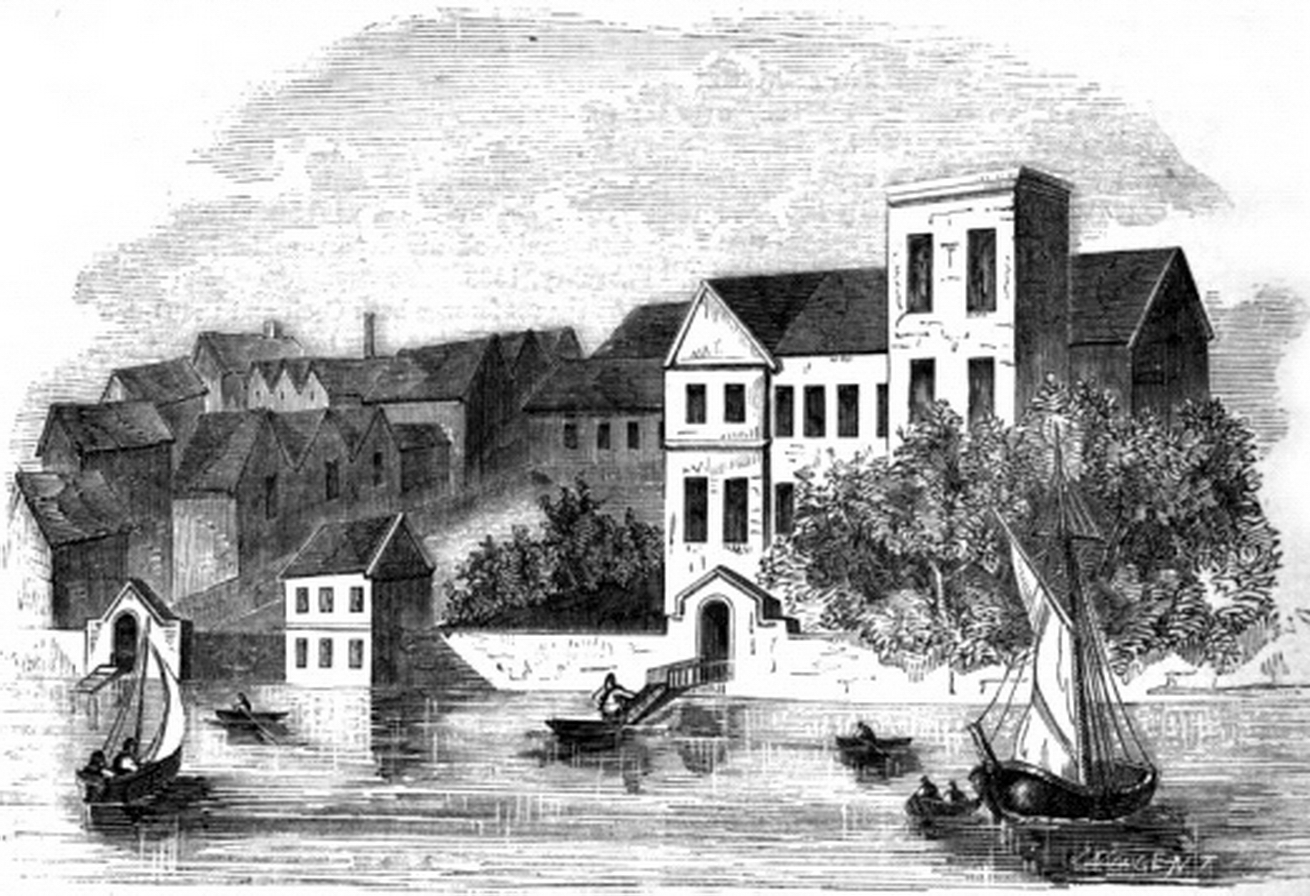
Essex House, from the Thames, after most of it was demolished

Essex House was a house that fronted the Strand in London. Originally called Leicester House, it was built around 1575 for Robert Dudley, 1st Earl of Leicester, and was renamed Essex House after being inherited by his stepson, Robert Devereux, 2nd Earl of Essex, after Leicester's death in 1588. The poet Philip Sidney lived in Leicester House for some time.

The property occupied the site where the Outer Temple, part of the London headquarters of the Knights Templar, had previously stood, and was immediately adjacent to the Middle Temple, one of the four Inns of Court. The house was substantial; in 1590, it was recorded as having 42 bedrooms, plus a picture gallery, kitchens, outhouses, a banqueting suite and a chapel.

Essex's mother, Lettice Knollys, leased out the house for a while, but she moved in later with her new husband, Sir Christopher Blount, as well as her son and his family. After the executions of Blount and Essex in 1601, she continued to live there until her death, leasing part of the house to James Hay, 1st Earl of Carlisle. On 8 January 1621, Hay hosted James VI and I, the royal court, and the French ambassador Maréchal de Cadenet. A lavish banquet involved sweetmeats costing £500 and ambergris used in cooking costing £300, and the total bill was £3,300. Hay staged a masque as entertainment in a large room above the dining area. Dancers appeared as the Titans, then Pallas Athene and Prometheus made speeches.

The house then became the property of Robert Devereux, 3rd Earl of Essex, who leased part of it to his brother-in-law, William Seymour, 1st Marquess of Hertford.

After the English Civil War, the family lost ownership as a result of their debts. Following the Restoration and the death of William Seymour, Sir Orlando Bridgeman lived in the house for a time. When the Duchess of Somerset died in 1674, she left the house to her granddaughter, whose husband, Sir Thomas Thynne, sold it, along with the adjoining lands and properties.

The main part of the house was demolished some time between 1674 and 1679. Essex Street was built on part of the site. One of those buildings was used in the mid-1770s as a Dissenters' meeting house known as the Essex Street Chapel, where Unitarianism was first preached in England. The denominational headquarters are still on the site, now called Essex Hall. Their building footprint is believed to include the Tudor chapel of Essex House.

The house (briefly) hosted the famous Cottonian Library, the "ancestor" of the British Library
