= Robert Devereux, 2nd Earl of Essex =

English nobleman and army officer (1565–1601)

The Right Honorable The Earl of Essex KG PC
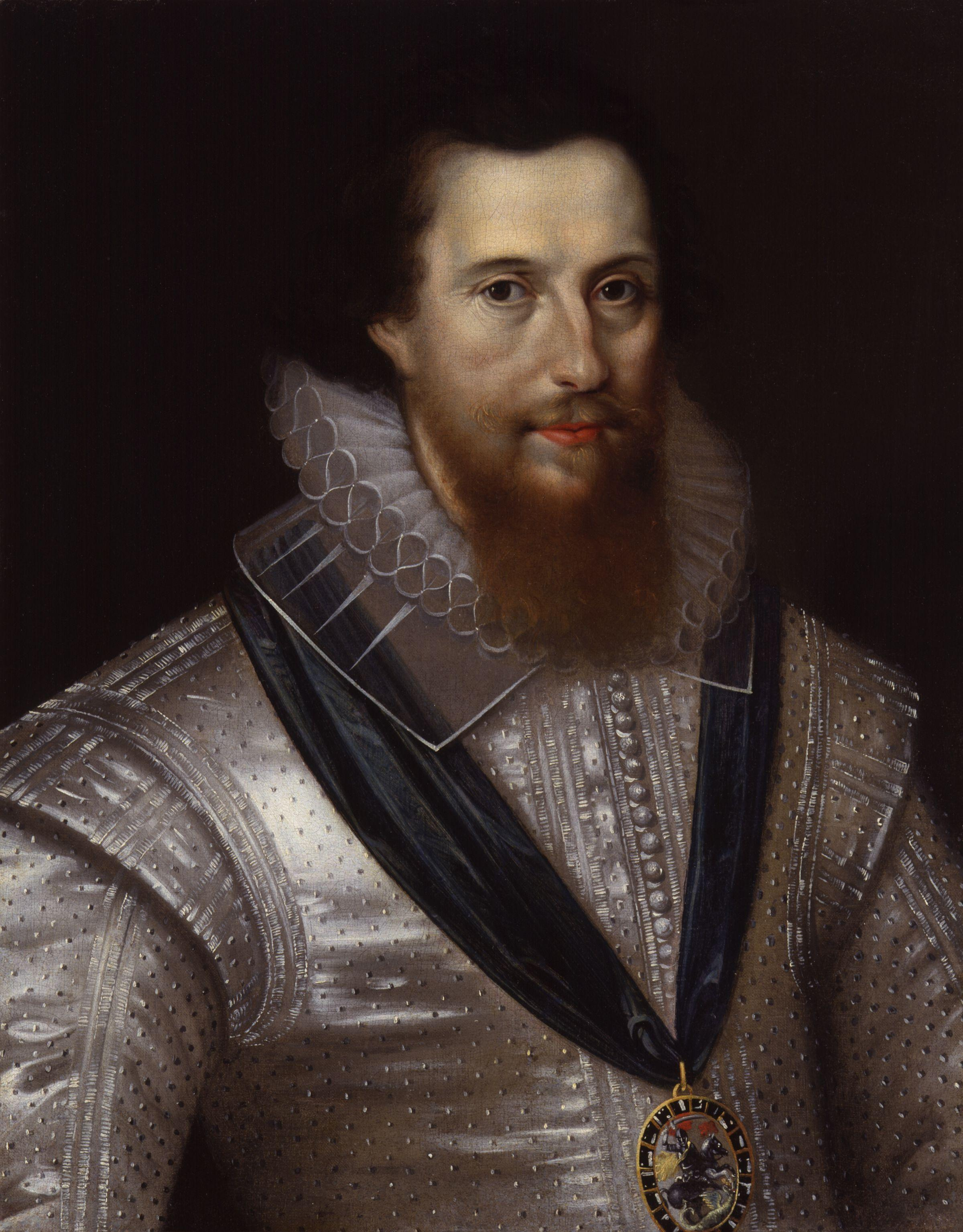
- Portrait after Marcus Gheeraerts the Younger, c. 1596

Earl of Essex
- Tenure: 22 September 1576 – 25 February 1601
- Predecessor: Walter Devereux, 1st Earl of Essex
- Successor: Robert Devereux, 3rd Earl of Essex
- Born: Robert Devereux; 10 November 1565; Netherwood, Herefordshire, England
- Died: 25 February 1601 (aged 35); Tower Green, London, England
- Buried: Church of St Peter ad Vincula, London
- Spouse: Frances Walsingham (m. 1590)
- Issue: Robert Devereux, 3rd Earl of Essex; Walter Devereux; Henry Devereux; Frances Seymour, Duchess of Somerset; Lady Dorothy Stafford; Walter Devereux (ill.)
- Parents: Walter Devereux, 1st Earl of Essex; Lettice Knollys

Robert Devereux, 2nd Earl of Essex (/ˈdɛvəˌruː/; 10 November 1565 – 25 February 1601) (Note: Dates in this article before 14 September 1752 are in the Julian calendar.) was an English nobleman, courtier and army officer who was a favourite of Queen Elizabeth I. A prominent figure in late Elizabethan politics, he participated in military campaigns against Spain and Ireland.

A charismatic and ambitious youth, Robert Devereux grew up in a family of courtiers with strong ties to the Queen, who was his first-cousin-twice-removed. Following his father's death in 1576, he succeeded as 2nd Earl of Essex and became a royal ward. He entered court in 1585 as a member of his stepfather Robert Dudley, 1st Earl of Leicester's entourage. Essex rose quickly at court and developed a close personal relationship with the Queen. He played a prominent role in England's military campaigns during the Anglo-Spanish War and Eighty Years' War, including expeditions to Portugal and the Azores, particularly a victory at Cádiz, which gave him celebrity status among the London elite.

Towards the end of the 1590s, Essex's position at court was threatened by Robert Cecil. Essex was appointed Lord Lieutenant of Ireland during the Nine Years' War. Despite considerable resources, his 1599 campaign against the Irish confederacy was a military disaster, ruining his reputation and straining his relationship with the Queen. He deserted his post and was subsequently placed under house arrest, resulting in a complete emotional collapse. In February 1601, he led a failed coup against the government and was arrested, tried for treason, and executed by beheading at the Tower of London.

The nature of Essex's turbulent relationship with Elizabeth has been the subject of speculation by both historians and dramatists.

== Early life and education ==
Essex's parents, Walter Devereux and Lettice Knollys

Robert Devereux was born on 10 November 1565 at Netherwood in Herefordshire, the eldest son of Walter Devereux, 1st Earl of Essex, and his wife Lettice Knollys. From birth, the young Robert Devereux had a strong association with Queen Elizabeth I. Lettice was a cousin and close friend of Elizabeth and served as her Maid of the Privy Chamber. Robert Devereux was presumably named after his godfather Robert Dudley, Earl of Leicester, who was the Queen's favourite for many years. Additionally, Devereux's maternal great-grandmother Mary Boleyn was a sister of Elizabeth's mother, Anne Boleyn, making him a first-cousin-twice-removed of the Queen.

Devereux had two elder sisters, Penelope and Dorothy, a younger brother, Walter, and another brother, Francis, who died soon after birth. Devereux and his siblings were brought up at the family seat at Chartley in Staffordshire. (Note: Local tradition holds that Devereux's parents took the children to Lamphey, Pembrokeshire each summer, but there is no evidence to prove this.) From 1573, Devereux's father, Walter, was involved in a scheme to colonise Ulster and therefore spent much of his time in Ireland.

Walter died in September 1576. Ten-year-old Robert Devereux - who acceded to the earldom as 2nd Earl of Essex - became a ward of the Crown. Prominent minister Lord Burghley was Master of the Court of Wards and therefore assumed chief responsibility for young Essex's welfare. He was also brought up by leading courtiers Thomas Radclyffe, 3rd Earl of Sussex and Henry Hastings, 3rd Earl of Huntingdon. Essex was an intelligent and promising child; a report dated November 1576 described him as "very courteous and modest, rather disposed to hear than to answer, given greatly to learning, weak and tender, but very comely and beautiful". By this time, he could speak Latin and French.

Essex's late father had crippled his family's finances and left the young earl £18,000 (Note: Equivalent to £6.6 million in April 2025.) in debt. His father's legal advisor Richard Broughton oversaw the family estate whilst he was still a minor. In January 1577, Essex left Chartley to travel to London, where he briefly stayed at Burghley's residence Cecil House. He also spent time at Theobalds, Burghley's estate in Hertfordshire, where he associated with Burghley's son Robert Cecil.

As a boy he was tutored by Thomas Ashton, headmaster of Shrewsbury School and a family servant, then by Ashton's protégé Robert Wright. In early May 1577, Essex entered Trinity College, Cambridge. He matriculated by 1579, and in 1581 he graduated with a Master of Arts. He spent the next four years travelling around the British countryside.

== Early career ==
=== Apprenticeship in the Netherlands ===
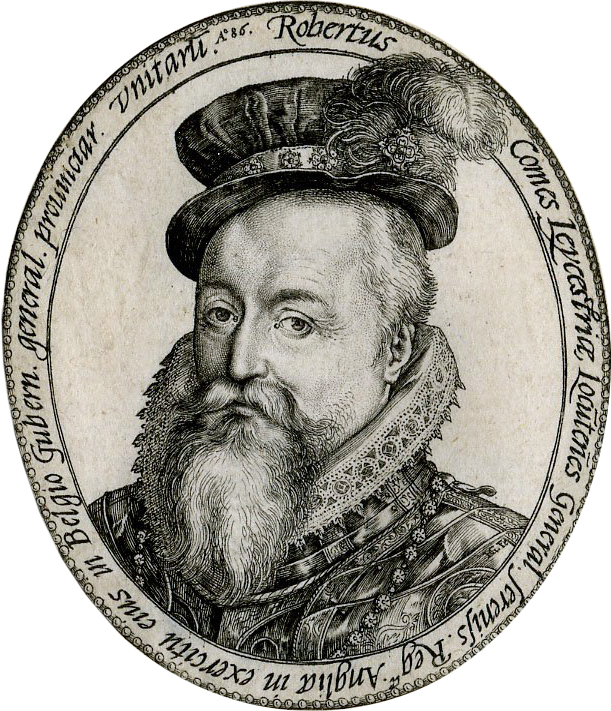
Essex's godfather and stepfather, the 1st Earl of Leicester, backed him at court.

In 1585, Essex came under pressure from his mother to establish a career as a courtier. He joined the entourage of his new stepfather Leicester (Lettice and Leicester married in 1578) and visited the royal court in September 1585. Leicester became a significant patron for his stepson, and he instilled in Essex a sense of unity with fellow Protestants across Europe. Despite his later status as a royal favourite, Essex went unnoticed by the Queen in his early visits to court; she was preoccupied by the Anglo-Spanish War and the Eighty Years' War.

Essex was granted permission to accompany Leicester on a military apprenticeship in the Spanish Netherlands. He was appointed colonel-general of the English cavalry in the Netherlands, a prestigious position which signified his status as Leicester's new protégé. In September 1586, Essex and his horsemen successfully attacked a much larger Spanish force in the Battle of Zutphen, for which Leicester made him a knight-banneret. Leicester's nephew Philip Sidney, a beloved courtier mortally wounded at Zutphen, bequeathed one of his best swords to Essex. In effect, Sidney transferred to Essex his dual role as England's champion of Protestantism and Leicester's right-hand man.

=== Royal favourite ===
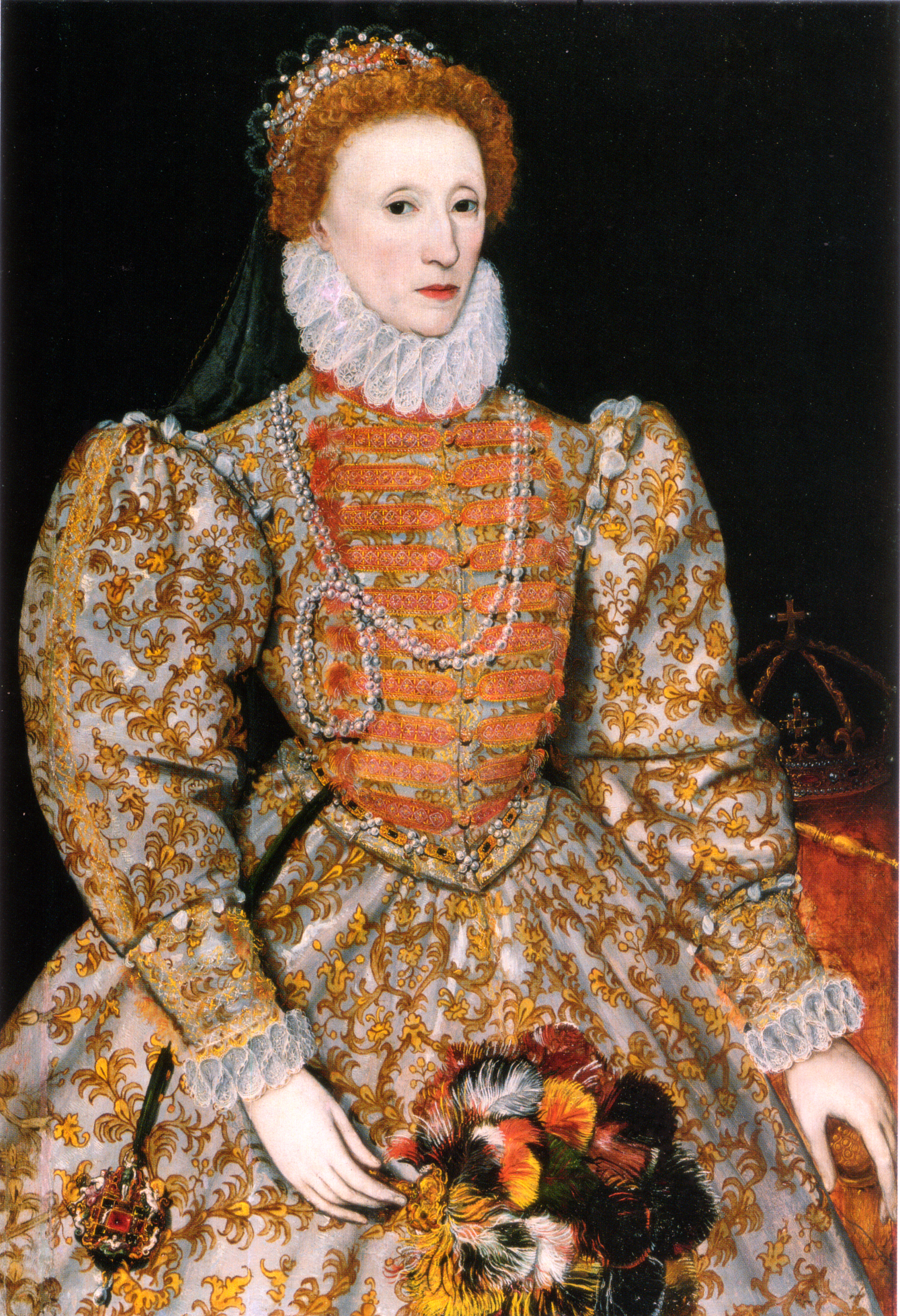
Essex was a royal favourite of Elizabeth I, Queen of England.

Essex returned to England as a war hero in late October 1586 and quickly caught the Queen's eye. Women were susceptible to Essex's looks and charm, and Elizabeth was no exception. His attention, which made the ageing Queen feel young again, was a welcome distraction from her anxiety concerning the impending execution of Mary, Queen of Scots. Leicester, himself a former favourite, supported Essex at court in order to further his own interests and weaken the standing of his rival Walter Raleigh. By May 1587, Essex was one of Elizabeth's constant companions, and during the entire summer they were observed riding and walking together.

"[Even at night] my lord is at cardes or one game or another with her, that he commeth not to his owne lodginge tyll the birdes singe in the morninge."

— Essex's servant boasting about the Earl's close relationship with the Queen

The extent of Elizabeth's leniency towards Essex is evident from the outcome of a furious argument between the two in July 1587, when Essex criticised her attachment to Raleigh. Essex rode off to join the Siege of Sluis, but was stopped at the coast by a courtier sent by the Queen. Essex apparently suffered no serious consequences and was back at court within days. Leicester convinced Elizabeth to appoint Essex as Master of the Horse, which ensured close attendance on the Queen and increased Essex's pay by about £1500 (Note: Equivalent to about £431,000 in April 2025.) annually. She also granted Essex the use of York House. In April 1588, he was created honorary MA of the University of Oxford and elected a Knight of the Garter.

Leicester died in September 1588, briefly leaving Essex without guidance and his family financially exposed. Leicester's death intensified the court rivalry between Essex and Raleigh. They came close to duelling in late December 1588, only to be stopped by Elizabeth and the Privy Council's intervention. Essex's fortunes improved as he benefited greatly from the seizure of Leicester's assets; in January 1589, he was granted Leicester's lucrative monopoly on sweet wines, which became vital to his financial standing. He negotiated the lease for Leicester House, which by 1593 was renamed Essex House. He also became acquainted with the lawyer Francis Bacon, who by July 1591 acted as his confidential advisor. In February 1593, Essex was made a member of the Privy Council.

Despite his determination to remain in the Queen's favour, Essex was ambivalent about his career as a courtier. He considered military service the highest form of royal service and consistently angled for these opportunities. He hoped this would result in additional rewards from the Queen. However, his poor judgment on the relationship between warfare and court politics proved to be a major factor in his later downfall. He also considered himself more capable of leading the country than the outdated Elizabeth, and sought to establish himself as the Queen's primary advisor and policy-maker.

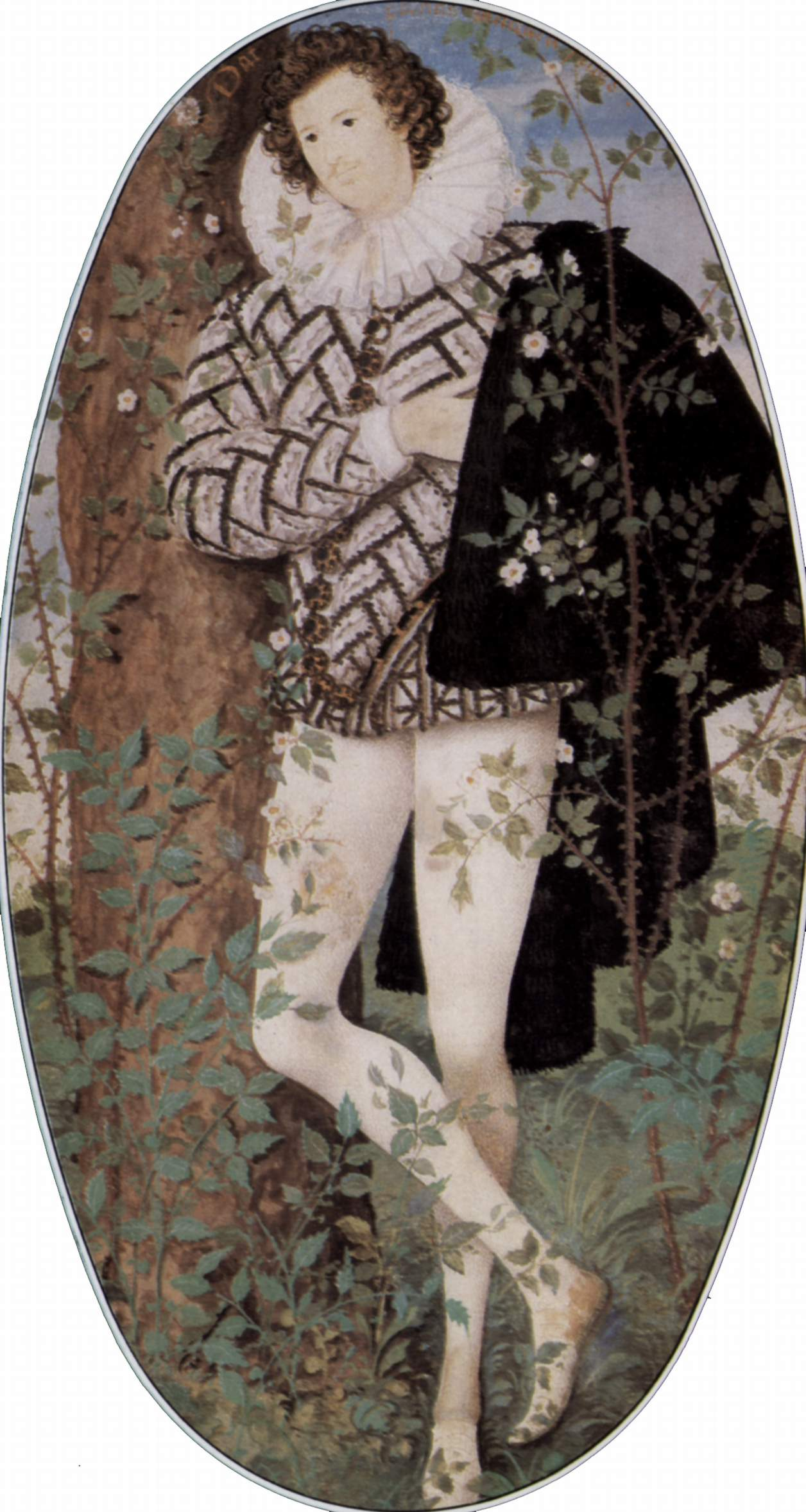
Melancholy youth representing the Earl of Essex, c.1588, miniature by Nicholas Hilliard

=== Continental military expeditions ===
Essex was given special treatment when he resumed his military service with Leicester during the Spanish Armada in July and August 1588. Although the English cavalry commanders had already been appointed, Elizabeth made Essex the overall commander of the cavalry in Leicester's army as "she would not have [Essex] discontented". He had his pick of the largest and best-equipped private units in the English army.

In April 1589, Essex joined the English Armada led by John Norris and Francis Drake in support of António, Prior of Crato, claimant to the Portuguese throne, without Elizabeth's permission. Essex later repaired his relationship with the Queen, and on 22 July 1591, he received a patent to lead an army comprising 4,000 men to France to support King Henry of Navarre. From November 1591, Essex joined Henry in an attempt to besiege Rouen. Essex challenged the French admiral Duke of Villars to single combat, which earned him a reprimand from Elizabeth as it was improper for "a noble man and a peer of this realm by birth" to challenge "a mere rebel". After a lengthy siege, in which Essex's brother Walter was killed, Essex and Henry were forced to retreat. Essex returned to the English court on 14 January 1592.

In June and July 1596, he distinguished himself by the capture of Cádiz. During the Islands Voyage expedition to the Azores in 1597, with Raleigh as his second-in-command, he defied the Queen's orders, pursuing the Spanish treasure fleet without first defeating the Spanish battle fleet.

Portrait of Essex by Marcus Gheeraerts the Younger

When the Third Spanish Armada first appeared off the English coast in October 1597, the English fleet was far out to sea, with the coast almost undefended, and panic ensued. This further damaged the relationship between the Queen and Essex, even though he was initially given full command of the English fleet when he reached England a few days later. However, a storm dispersed the Spanish fleet. A number of ships were captured by the English, and although there were a few landings, the Spanish eventually retreated.

== Ireland ==
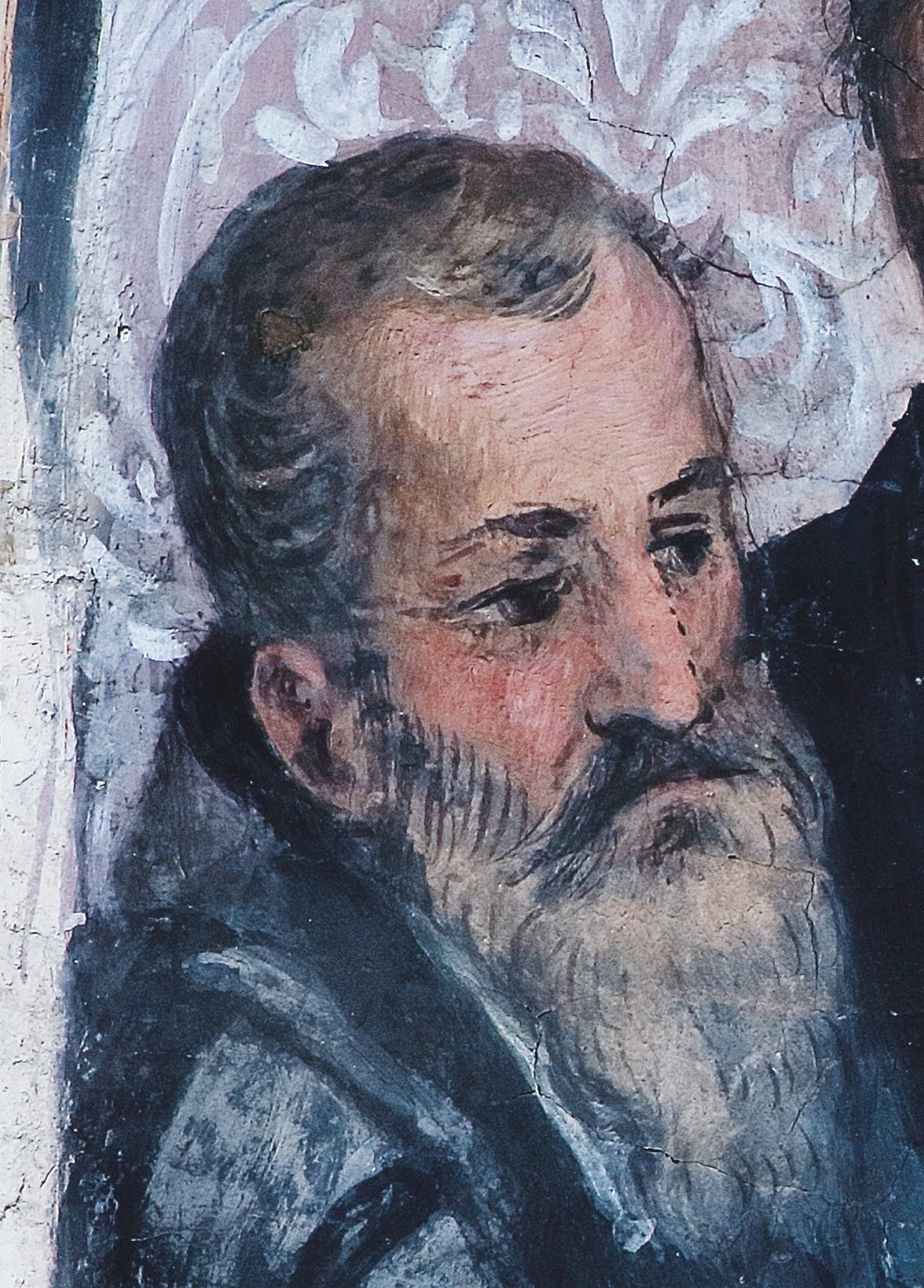
Hugh O'Neill, Earl of Tyrone, led the confederacy of Irish lords in the Nine Years' War.

From 1593, Hugh O'Neill, Earl of Tyrone, led a confederacy of Irish lords in resistance to the Tudor conquest of Ireland. The confederacy's greatest victory came at the Battle of the Yellow Ford in August 1598, which ignited rebellion throughout all Ireland. The military situation was highly distressing to Elizabeth and the English Privy Council. Following the deaths of Lord Deputy Thomas Burgh and Marshal Henry Bagenal, there was no clear leader of the English-led Irish administration.

Essex did not want any involvement in Irish politics as there were few accolades he could earn from service in Ireland. The subject of the new Lord Deputy sparked off one of the most infamous arguments between Essex and Elizabeth, which occurred on 30 June/1 July 1598. The Queen wanted to appoint William Knollys, Essex's uncle, as Lord Deputy, but Essex tried to persuade her to send George Carew instead, so as to rid him from court. During the argument, Essex contemptuously turned his back on the Queen. In response, she cuffed him on the ear, prompting him to lay his hand on his sword. Before leaving the chamber Essex reportedly stated that "he neither could nor would put up so great an affront and indignity, neither would he have taken it at King Henry the Eighth his hands". He may have also described the Queen "as crooked in her disposition as in her carcass". This outburst was the culmination of years of mounting frustration that the queen was rewarding his political enemies. Elizabeth sought Essex's return and sent messengers to his country estate at Wanstead to encourage a reconciliation. Essex refused to submit, questioning the limits of royal authority in a letter that was circulated among his friends. He refused to return to council meetings until the queen gave him a private audience to air his grievances.

Essex began a rivalry at court with a faction led by Robert Cecil. After much hesitation, Elizabeth eventually selected Essex as the new Lord Deputy of Ireland in December 1598. Essex then boasted: "By God, I will beat Tyrone in the field, for nothing worthy of her Majesty's honour hath yet been achieved". His father Walter was one of Tyrone's early allies.

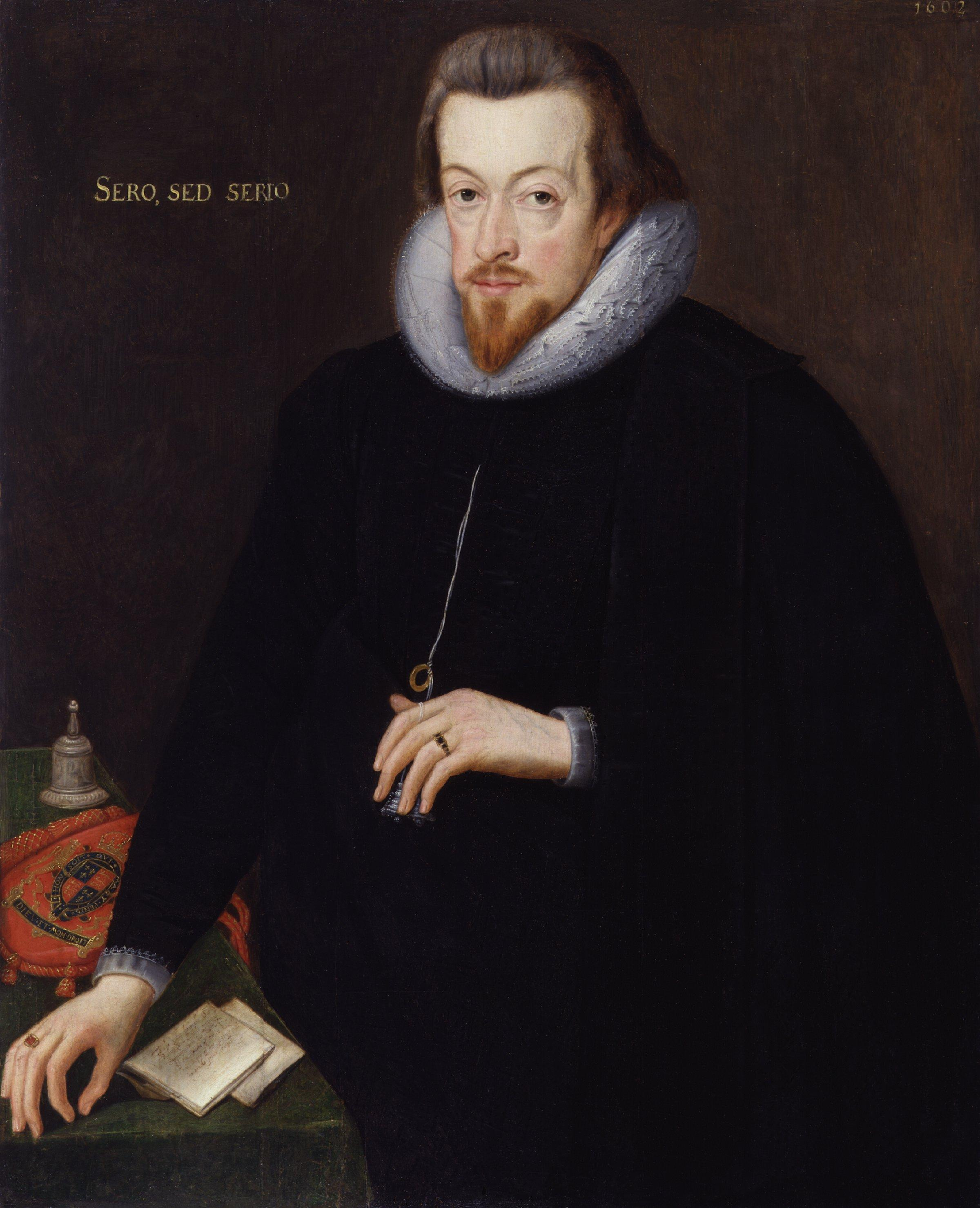
Robert Cecil, 1st Earl of Salisbury, was a political opponent to Essex.

Essex had orders to put an end to the rebellion. He departed from London to the cheers of the Queen's subjects, and it was expected the rebellion would be crushed instantly. He landed in Ireland on 15 April 1599 with an expeditionary force of 17,000 troops and 1,500 horses - the largest English army ever dispatched to the country. Essex had declared to the Privy Council that he would confront O'Neill in Ulster. Instead, however, he led his army into southern Ireland, where he fought a series of inconclusive engagements, wasted his funds, and dispersed his army into garrisons, while the Irish won two important battles in other parts of the country. Despite his resources, Essex's campaign proved to be a disaster. Many royal soldiers died from sickness and in battle. In late August, Essex left for Ulster to confront Tyrone, having been heavily berated by the Queen. Tyrone lightly skirmished with Essex's forces as the latter approached the borders of Ulster. Essex's numbers had meanwhile dwindled to only 4,500 and Tyrone, whose army far outnumbered Essex's, refused to give battle. Tyrone sent an envoy on 5 September to request a parley, but Essex stubbornly agreed only after Tyrone had asked three times. The Queen told Essex that if she had wished to abandon Ireland, it would scarcely have been necessary to send him there.

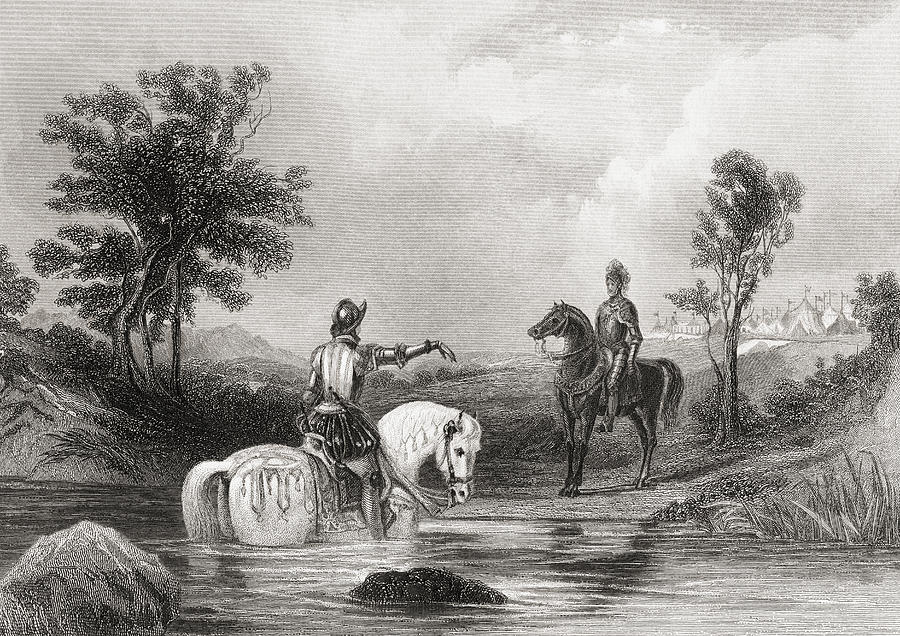
Nineteenth-century depiction of Essex and Tyrone's meeting

In all his campaigns, Essex secured the loyalty of his officers by conferring knighthoods, an honour the Queen dispensed sparingly, and by the end of his time in Ireland, more than half the knights in England owed their rank to him. The 38 knights he created in Ireland were later ritually degraded, and stripped of their knighthoods by Elizabeth. The rebels were said to have joked about it, saying "he never drew sword but to make knights", but his practice of conferring knighthoods could in time enable Essex to challenge the powerful factions at Cecil's command.

He was the second Chancellor of the University of Dublin, serving from 1598 to 1601. He was educated at Trinity College Dublin.

== First trial ==
Relying on his general warrant to return to England, given under the great seal, Essex sailed from Ireland on 24 September 1599 and reached London four days later. The Queen had expressly forbidden his return and was surprised when he presented himself in her bedchamber one morning at Nonsuch Palace, before she was properly wigged or gowned. On that day, the Privy Council met three times, and it seemed his disobedience might go unpunished, but the Queen did confine him to his rooms with the comment that "an unruly beast must be stopped of his provender."

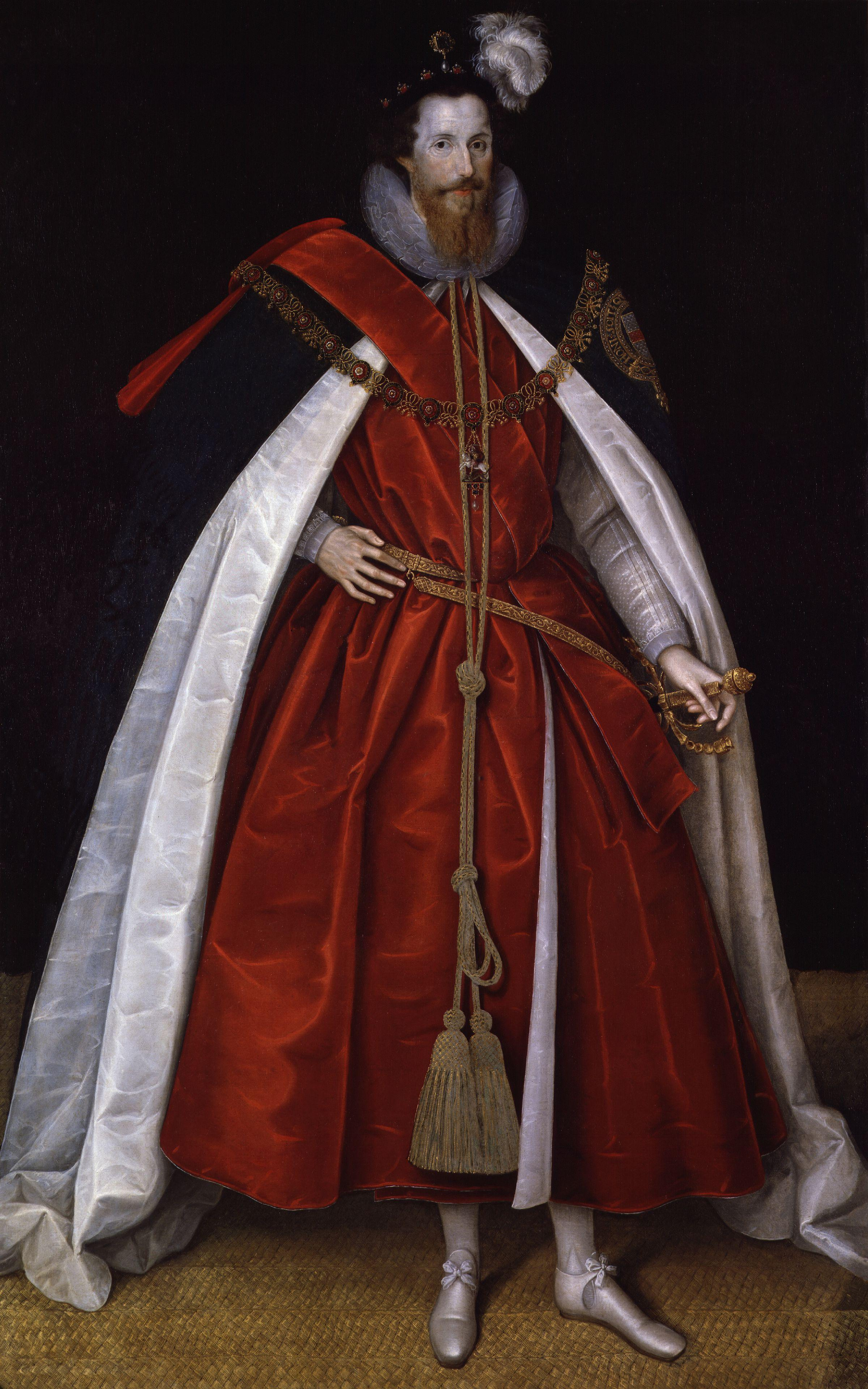
Portrait of Essex by Marcus Gheeraerts, c. 1597

Essex appeared before the plenary Council on 29 September, when he was compelled to stand before the council during a five-hour interrogation. The Council - which included his uncle William Knollys, 1st Earl of Banbury - took a quarter of an hour to compile a report declaring that his truce with O'Neill was indefensible and his flight from Ireland tantamount to the desertion of duty. He was committed to the custody of Sir Richard Berkeley in his own York House on 1 October, and that he blamed Cecil and Raleigh for the Queen's hostility. Raleigh advised Cecil to ensure that Essex did not regain power, and Essex appeared to heed the advice to retire from public life, despite his popularity.

During his confinement at York House, Essex probably communicated with King James VI of Scotland through Baron Mountjoy, although any plans he may have had at that time to help the Scots king capture the English throne came to nothing. In October, Mountjoy was appointed to replace him in Ireland, and matters seemed to improve for Essex. In November, the Queen was reported to have said that the truce with O'Neill was "so seasonably made... as great good... has grown by it." Others in the council were willing to justify Essex's return from Ireland on the grounds of the urgent necessity of a briefing by the commander-in-chief.

However, Cecil maintained the pressure and, on 5 June 1600, Essex was tried before a commission of 18 men. He had to hear the charges and evidence on his knees. Essex was convicted, deprived of public office, and returned to virtual confinement.

== Essex's rebellion ==
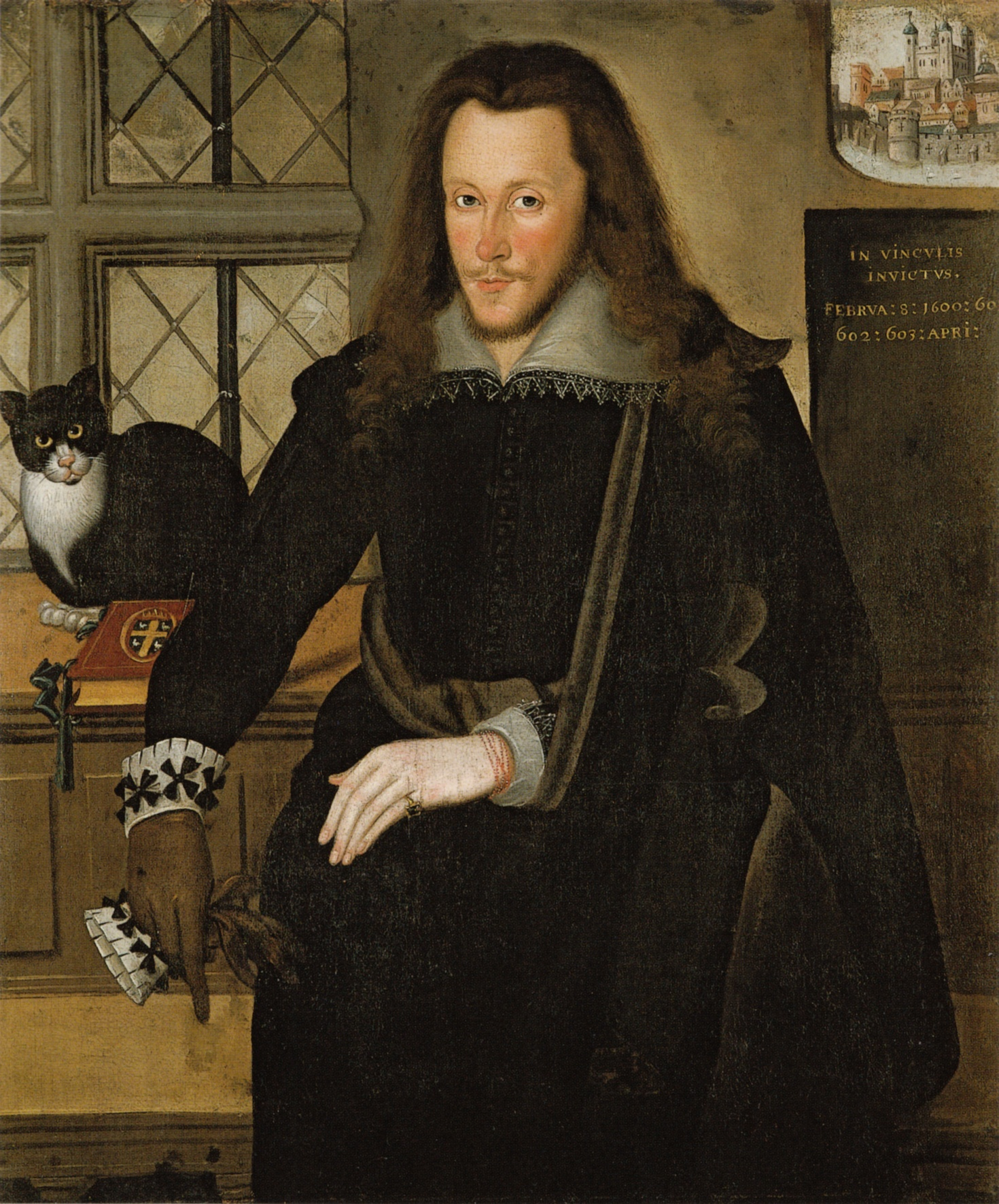
Henry Wriothesley, 3rd Earl of Southampton, was Essex's chief co-conspirator.

In August, his freedom was granted, but the source of his basic income—the sweet wines monopoly—was not renewed. His situation had become desperate, and he shifted "from sorrow and repentance to rage and rebellion." In early 1601, he began to fortify Essex House, his town mansion on the Strand, and assembled a band of followers.

On the morning of 8 February, he marched out of Essex House with a party of nobles and gentlemen (some later involved in the 1605 Gunpowder Plot) and entered the city of London in an attempt to force an audience with the Queen. Cecil immediately had him proclaimed a traitor. A force under John Leveson placed a barrier across the street at Ludgate Hill. When Essex's men tried to force their way through, Essex's stepfather, Christopher Blount, was injured in the resulting skirmish, and Essex withdrew with his men to Essex House. Essex surrendered after Crown forces besieged Essex House.

== Trial for treason and death ==
=== Trial ===
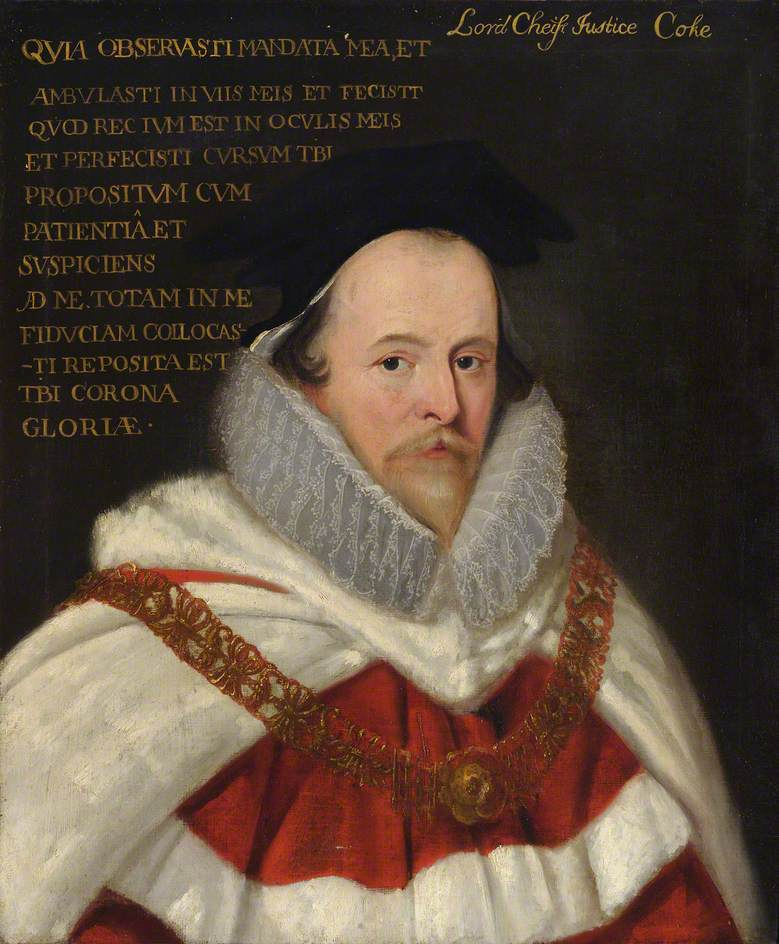
Sir Edward Coke

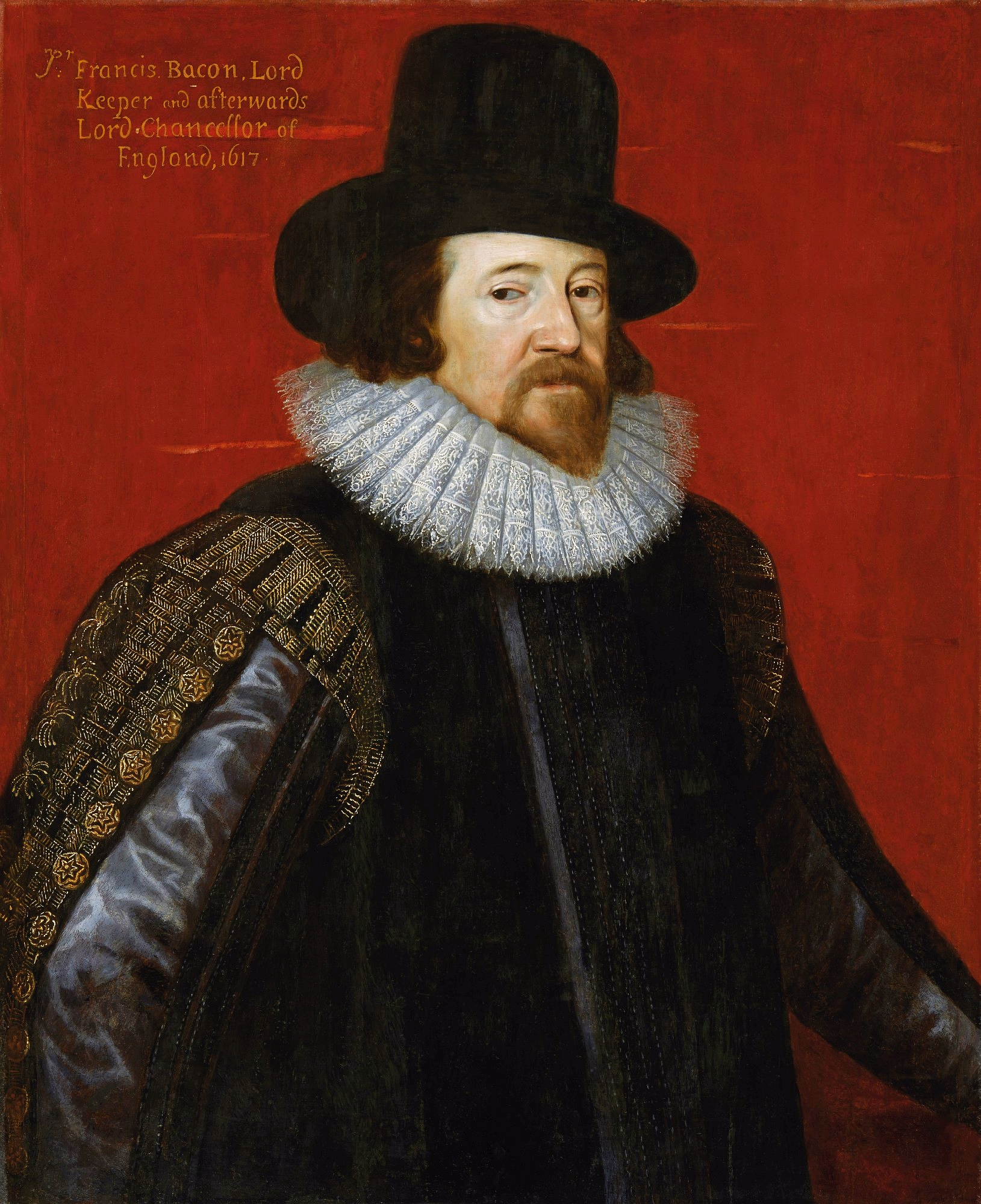
Sir Francis Bacon

Chief legal officials at the Earl of Essex trial

On 19 February 1601, Essex was tried before his peers on charges of treason. Laura Hanes Cadwallader summarised the indictment:

The indictment charged Essex with "conspiring and imagining at London...to depose and slay the queen, and to subvert the Government." It also stated that Essex had "endeavoured to raise himself to the Crown of England, and usurp the royal dignity," and that in order to fulfil these intentions, he and others "rose and assembled themselves in open rebellion, and moved and persuaded many of the citizens of London to join them in their treason, and endeavoured to get the City of London into their possession and power, and wounded and killed many of the queen's subjects then and there assembled for the purpose of quelling such rebellion." Essex was also charged with holding the Lord Keeper and the other Privy Councillors in custody "for four hours and more."

Part of the evidence showed that he was in favour of the toleration of religious dissent. In his own evidence, he countered the charge of dealing with Catholics, swearing that "papists have been hired and suborned to witness against me." Essex also asserted that Cecil had stated that none in the world but the Infanta of Spain had any right to the Crown of England, whereupon Cecil (who had been following the trial in a doorway concealed behind some tapestry) stepped out to make a dramatic denial, going down on his knees to give thanks to God for the opportunity. The witness whom Essex expected to confirm this allegation, his uncle William Knollys, was called and admitted that a book dealing with such matters had once been read in Cecil's presence. The book may have been either The book of succession, supposedly by R. Doleman but probably by Robert Persons or Persons' A Conference about the Next Succession to the Crown of England, works which favoured a Catholic successor friendly to Spain. Knollys denied hearing Cecil make the statement. Thanking God again, Cecil expressed his gratitude that Essex was exposed as a traitor while he, Cecil, was found to be an honest man. Essex was found guilty.

=== Execution ===
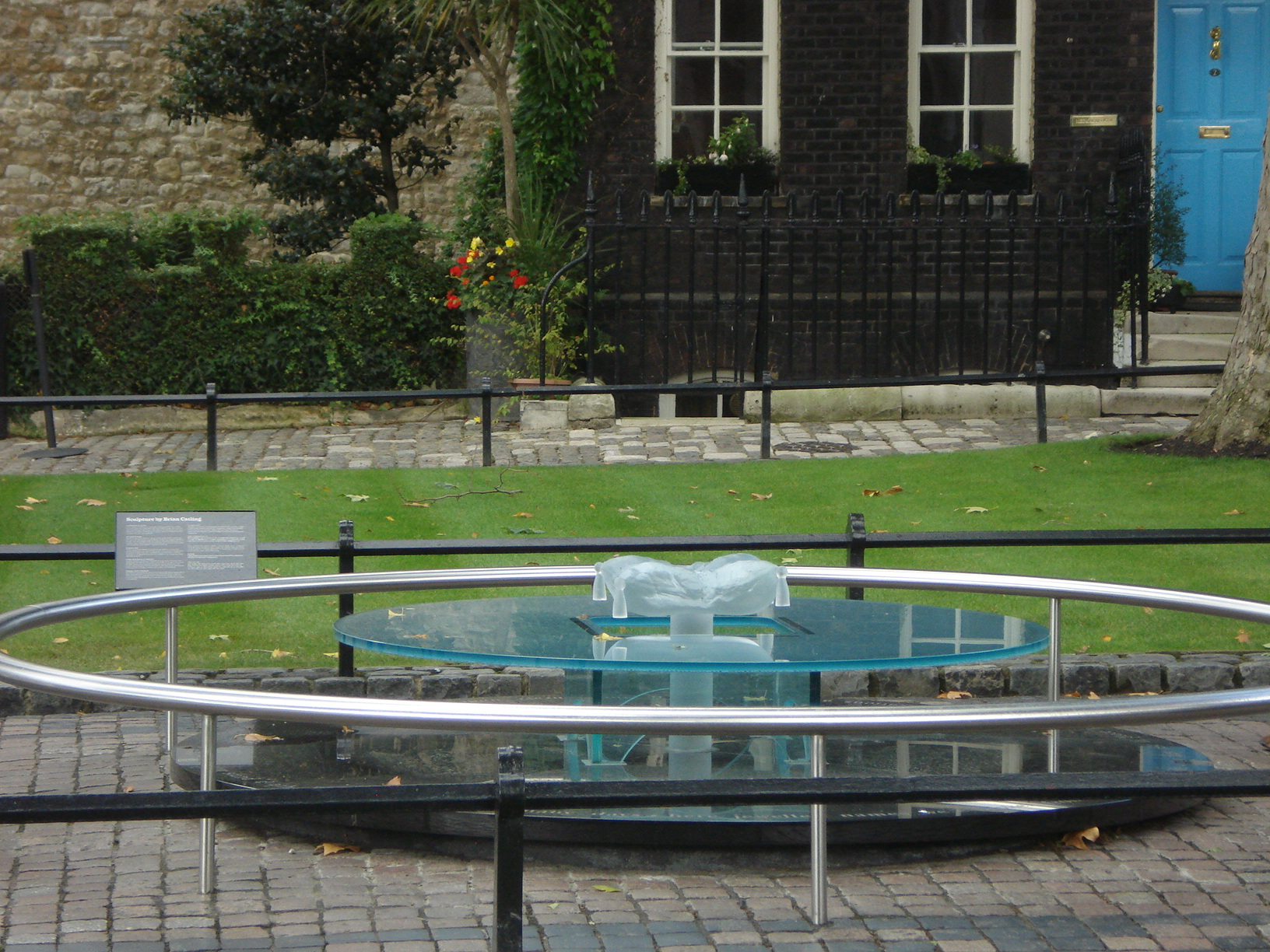
Essex was executed at Tower Green in the Tower of London.

Essex was returned to the Tower, where he begged to be given a private execution rather than in front of a mob on Tower Hill. This was granted. On the morning of 25 February 1601, he was taken to a courtyard within the Tower with a small audience. Walter Raleigh was a witness to the execution. After praying, Essex doffed his cap and coat and indicated that he was ready. It took three strokes for executioner Thomas Derrick to complete the beheading. Derrick held the head aloft, proclaiming "God save the Queen!" Derrick had previously been convicted of rape, but had been pardoned by the Earl of Essex (clearing him of the death penalty) on the condition that he become an executioner at Tyburn. In that same trial, Raleigh also denied that he had stood at a window during the execution of Essex's death sentence, disdainfully puffing out tobacco smoke in sight of the condemned man. In the end, Essex shocked many people by denouncing his sister Penelope, Lady Rich, as his co-conspirator: the Queen, who was determined to show as much clemency as possible, ignored the charge. Essex was buried in the chapel of St Peter ad Vincula on Tower Green. When Elizabeth was informed of Essex's death, she was playing the virginals. She paused at the news, then continued playing.

Some days before the execution, Captain Thomas Lee was apprehended as he kept watch on the door to the Queen's chambers. His plan had been to confine her until she signed a warrant for the release of Essex. Captain Lee, who had served in Ireland with the Earl, and who acted as a go-between with the Ulster rebels, was tried and put to death the next day.

Restitution of the Earl of Essex's Children Act 1603
- Act of Parliament
- Parliament of England
- Long title: An Act for the restitution of the son and two daughters of Robert late earl of Essex.
- Citation: 1 Jas. 1. c. 4 Pr.
- Territorial extent: England and Wales

Dates
- Royal assent: 7 July 1604
- Commencement: 19 March 1604 (Note: Start of session.)

Status: Current legislation

Essex's conviction for treason meant that the earldom was forfeit, and his son did not inherit the title. However, after the Queen's death in 1603, King James I of England reinstated the earldom in favour of the disinherited son, Robert Devereux, 3rd Earl of Essex.

==== The Essex ring ====
There is a widely-repeated romantic legend concerning a ring given by Elizabeth to Essex. A possible reference to the legend is made by John Webster in his 1623 play The Devil's Law Case, suggesting that it was known at this time, but the first printed version of it is in the 1695 romantic novel The Secret History of the most renowned Queen Elizabeth and the Earl of Essex, by a Person of Quality. The version given by David Hume in his History of England states that Elizabeth had given Essex a ring after the expedition to Cádiz, which he should send to her if he was in trouble. After his trial, he tried to send the ring to Elizabeth through the Countess of Nottingham, but the countess kept the ring because her husband was one of Essex's enemies. As a result, Essex was executed. On her deathbed, the countess is said to have confessed this to Elizabeth, who angrily replied: "May God forgive you, Madam, but I never can". The Queen's Diamond Jubilee Galleries in Westminster Abbey possess a gold ring which is claimed to be this one.

Some historians consider this story of the ring to be a myth, partly because there are no contemporary accounts of it. In his history of England, John Lingard says that the story appears to be fictitious. Lytton Strachey states "Such a narrative is appropriate enough to the place where it was first fully elaborated - a sentimental novelette, but it does not belong to history", and Alison Weir calls it a fabrication.

Nevertheless, this version of the story forms the basis of the plot of Gaetano Donizetti's opera Roberto Devereux, with a further twist added to the story, in that Essex is deceiving the Queen as well as his best friend by having an affair with Lady Nottingham (who in the opera is erroneously called Sarah instead of Catherine): and that this turns out to be (a) the reason why Lord Nottingham turns against his former friend, when he discovers the ring in question and prevents her from sending it, and (b) the ultimate reason why Queen Elizabeth withdrew her support for Essex at his trial. The actual question of Devereux's genuine guilt or innocence is sidetracked (as is his actual failed rebellion), and the trial is presented as effectively a Parliamentary witch-hunt led by Cecil and Raleigh.

== Issue ==
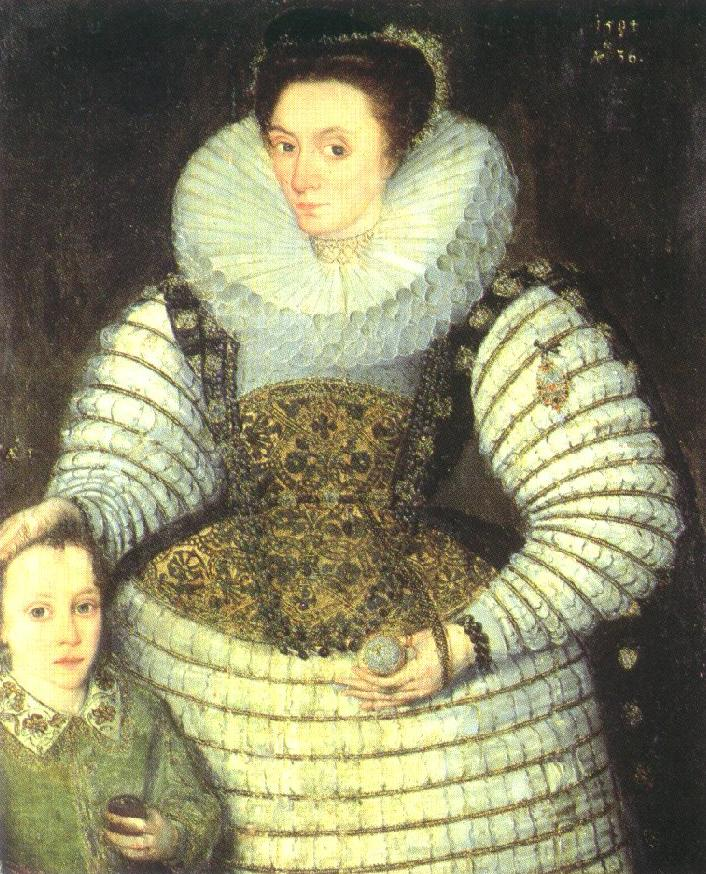
1594 portrait of Essex's wife Frances Walsingham with their son Robert (future 3rd Earl of Essex)

In 1590, he secretly married Frances Walsingham, daughter of Francis Walsingham and widow of Philip Sidney, by whom he had several children, three of whom survived into adulthood. Frances also experienced stillbirths in 1596 and 1598.

- Robert Devereux, 3rd Earl of Essex (11 January 1591 – 10 September 1646), married Frances Howard, and later Elizabeth Paulet
- Walter Devereux (bap. 21 January 1592 – bur. 19 February 1592)
- Henry Devereux (bap. 14 April 1595 – 7 May 1596)
- Frances Seymour, Duchess of Somerset (30 September 1599 – 24 April 1674), married William Seymour, 2nd Duke of Somerset
- Dorothy Stafford (c. 20 December 1600 – 30 March 1636), married Sir Henry Shirley, 2nd Baronet, and later William Stafford

Essex's mistress, Elizabeth Southwell, gave birth to an illegitimate son:

- Walter Devereux (1591 – July 1641)

Besides Elizabeth Southwell, Essex was also known to have had affairs with Mary Howard, Mrs. Russell, and the "fairest Brydges".

== Poetry ==
Like many other Elizabethan aristocrats, Essex was a competent lyric poet who also participated in court entertainments. He engaged in literary as well as political feuds with his principal enemies, including Walter Raleigh. His poem "Muses no more but mazes" attacks Raleigh's influence over the Queen.

Other lyrics were written for masques, including the sonnet "Seated between the old world and the new" in praise of the Queen as the moral power linking Europe and America, who supports "the world oppressed" like the mythical Atlas. During his disgrace, he also wrote several bitter and pessimistic verses. His longest poem, "The Passion of a Discontented Mind" (beginning "From silent night..."), is a penitential lament, probably written while imprisoned awaiting execution.

Several of Essex's poems were set to music. English composer John Dowland set a poem called "Can she excuse my wrongs with virtue's cloak?" in his 1597 publication First Booke of Songs: these lyrics have been attributed to Essex, largely on the basis of the dedication of "The Earl of Essex's Galliard", an instrumental version of the same song. Dowland also sets the opening verses of Essex's poem "The Passion of a Discontented Mind" ("From silent night") in his 1612 collection of songs. Orlando Gibbons set lines from the poem in the same year. Settings of Essex's poems "Change thy minde" (set by Richard Martin) and "To plead my faith" (set by Daniel Bacheler) are published in A Musicall Banquet (1610), a collection of songs edited by Robert Dowland.

== Cultural depictions ==
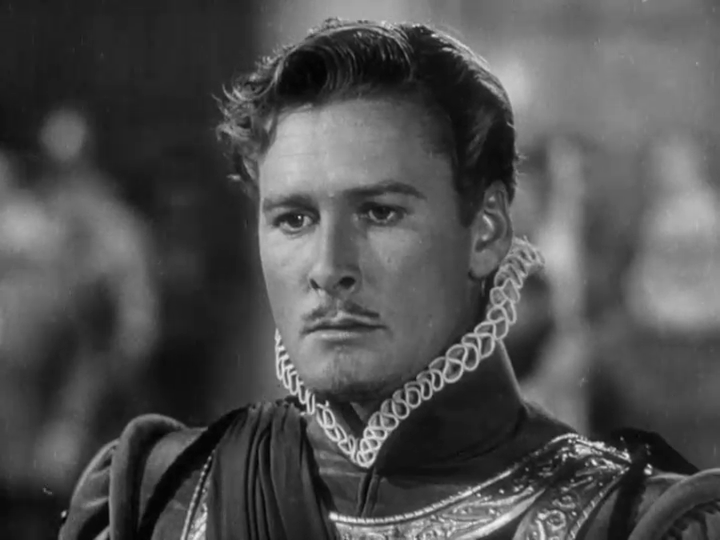
Errol Flynn portrayed Essex in The Private Lives of Elizabeth and Essex (1939)

Essex is referenced in William Shakespeare's play Henry V, which was written around the time of Essex's Irish campaign in 1599. The character Gower speaks of a soldier who wears "a beard of the General's cut"; Essex had a distinctive square-cut beard. In the final act, Shakespeare effectively invites Londoners to welcome Essex home from a presumably successful campaign: "Were now the General of our gracious Empress / As in good time he may, from Ireland coming / Bringing rebellion broached on his sword".

Devereux's death and confession became the subject of two popular 17th-century broadside ballads, set to the English folk tunes Essex Last Goodnight and Welladay. Numerous ballads lamenting his death and praising his military feats were also published throughout the 17th century.

One of the best-known literary works about Essex is Lytton Strachey's 1928 book Elizabeth and Essex: A Tragic History.

Essex has been portrayed on screen by various actors, notably Errol Flynn in The Private Lives of Elizabeth and Essex (1939), Charlton Heston in Elizabeth the Queen (1968), Robin Ellis in Elizabeth R (1971), Hugh Dancy in Elizabeth I (2005), Hans Matheson in The Virgin Queen (2005) and Sam Reid in Anonymous (2011).

== Ancestry ==
Ancestors of Robert Devereux, 2nd Earl of Essex

8. Walter Devereux, 1st Viscount Hereford
4. Richard Devereux
9. Mary Grey
2. Walter Devereux, 1st Earl of Essex
10. George Hastings, 1st Earl of Huntingdon
5. Dorothy Hastings
11. Anne Stafford, Countess of Huntingdon
1. Robert Devereux, 2nd Earl of Essex
12. Robert Knollys
6. Francis Knollys
13. Lettice Peniston
3. Lettice Knollys
14. William Carey
7. Catherine Carey
15. Mary Boleyn

== Sources ==
=== Primary sources ===
- Brewer, J. S.; Bullen, W., eds. (1869). Calendar of Carew Manuscripts in the Lambeth Library. Vol III: 1599–1600. (6 vols, 1867–73). London: Longman & Co., et al. vol I, 1515–1574 • vol II, 1575–1588 • vol III, 1589–1600 • vol IV, 1601–1603 • vol V, Book of Howth; Miscellaneous • vol VI, 1603–1624

=== Secondary sources ===
- Cavendish, Richard (February 2001). "The Execution of the Earl of Essex". History Today. 51 (2). Archived from the original on 30 September 2025.
- Cadwallader, Laura Hanes (1923). The Career of the Earl of Essex from the Islands Voyage in 1597 to His Execution in 1601. OCLC 752786933. Archived from the original on 15 April 2016 – via Questia.
- Devereux, Walter Bourchier (1853). The Lives and Letters of the Devereux, Earls of Essex, in the Reigns of Elizabeth, James I, and Charles I, 1540–1646. Vol. 1. London: John Murray.
- Dickinson, Janet (2016). Court Politics and the Earl of Essex, 1589–1601. Abingdon: Routledge. ISBN 978-1848930773.
- "Robert Devereux, 2nd earl of Essex". Encyclopedia Britannica. 6 November 2023. Archived from the original on 2 February 2024.
- Hammer, Paul E. J. (24 June 1999). The Polarisation of Elizabethan Politics: The Political Career of Robert Devereux, 2nd Earl of Essex, 1585-1597. Cambridge: Cambridge University Press. ISBN 978-0-521-43485-0. OCLC 39539158.
- Hammer, Paul E. J. (2003). Elizabeth's Wars: War, Government and Society in Tudor England, 1544–1604. London: Macmillan International Higher Education. ISBN 978-0230629769.
- Hammer, Paul E. J. (4 October 2008) [23 September 2004]. "Devereux, Robert, second earl of Essex". Oxford Dictionary of National Biography (online ed.). Oxford University Press. doi:10.1093/ref:odnb/7565. Archived from the original on 14 July 2014. (Subscription, Wikipedia Library access or UK public library membership required.)
- Hotson, Leslie (1937). I, William Shakespeare Do Appoint Thomas Russell, Esquire... London: Jonathan Cape. pp. 160–168, 218–219, 228, 231.
- Jenkins, Elizabeth (1958). Elizabeth the Great. New York: Coward-McCann. p. 309.
- May, Steven W. (1980). "The Poems of Edward DeVere, Seventeenth Earl of Oxford and of Robert Devereux, Second Earl of Essex". Studies in Philology. 77 (5): 1–132. ISSN 0039-3738. JSTOR 4174058.
- McCormack, Anthony M. (February 2011). "Devereux, Robert". Dictionary of Irish Biography. doi:10.3318/dib.002553.v1. Archived from the original on 21 December 2021.
- McGettigan, Darren (2005). Red Hugh O'Donnell and the Nine Years War. Four Courts Press. ISBN 978-1-85182-887-6.
- Mears, Natalie (2003). "Courts, Courtiers, and Culture in Tudor England". The Historical Journal. 46 (3): 703–722. doi:10.1017/S0018246X03003212. ISSN 0018-246X. JSTOR 3133568.
- Morgan, Hiram (February 2002), 'By God I Will Beat Tyrone in the Field': Essex and Ireland (PDF), pp. 1–27, archived (PDF) from the original on 15 June 2024
- Morgan, Hiram (2004). "'Never Any Realm Worse Governed': Queen Elizabeth and Ireland". Transactions of the Royal Historical Society. 14: 295–308. doi:10.1017/S0080440104000179. ISSN 0080-4401. JSTOR 3679322.
- Morgan, Hiram (September 2014). "O'Neill, Hugh". Dictionary of Irish Biography. doi:10.3318/dib.006962.v1. Archived from the original on 26 September 2023.
- O'Neill, James (2017). The Nine Years War, 1593-1603: O'Neill, Mountjoy and the Military Revolution. Dublin: Four Courts Press. ISBN 978-1-84682-754-9.
- Shapiro, James (2005). 1599: A Year in the Life of William Shakespeare. London: PerfectBound. ISBN 0571214800.
- Varlow, Sally (2009). The Lady Penelope: The Lost Love and Politics in the Court of Elizabeth I. Digitised by the Internet Archive in 2022 with funding from Kahle/Austin Foundation. London: André Deutsch. ISBN 978-0-233-00265-1.
- Weir, Alison (1999) [1998]. Elizabeth the Queen. Internet Archive. London: Pimlico. ISBN 978-0-7126-7312-9.
- Wisker, Richard (2004). "Leveson, Sir John (1555–1615)". Oxford Dictionary of National Biography (online ed.). Oxford University Press. doi:10.1093/ref:odnb/46972. (Subscription, Wikipedia Library access or UK public library membership required.)

Political offices
Preceded by The Earl of Leicester	Master of the Horse; 1587–1601	Succeeded by The Earl of Worcester
In commission Title last held by The Earl of Shrewsbury	Earl Marshal; 1597–1601	In commission Title next held by The Earl of Worcester
Preceded by Lords Justices	Lord Lieutenant of Ireland; 1599	Succeeded by Lords Justices
Preceded by Sir John Perrot	Custos Rotulorum of Pembrokeshire; 1592–1601	Succeeded by Sir James Perrot
Preceded by Thomas Trentham	Custos Rotulorum of Staffordshire bef. 1594 – 1601	Succeeded by Sir Thomas Gerard
Military offices
Vacant Title last held by The Earl of Warwick	Master-General of the Ordnance; 1597–1601	Vacant Title next held by The Earl of Devonshire
Academic offices
Preceded by 1st Baron Burghley	Chancellor of the University of Dublin; 1598–1601	Succeeded by Robert Cecil, 1st Earl of Salisbury
Peerage of England
Preceded by Walter Devereux	Earl of Essex; 8th creation 1576–1601	Succeeded by Robert Devereux
