= Lettice Knollys =

English noblewoman and aristocrat (1543–1634)

- Viscountess Hereford; Countess of Essex; Countess of Leicester
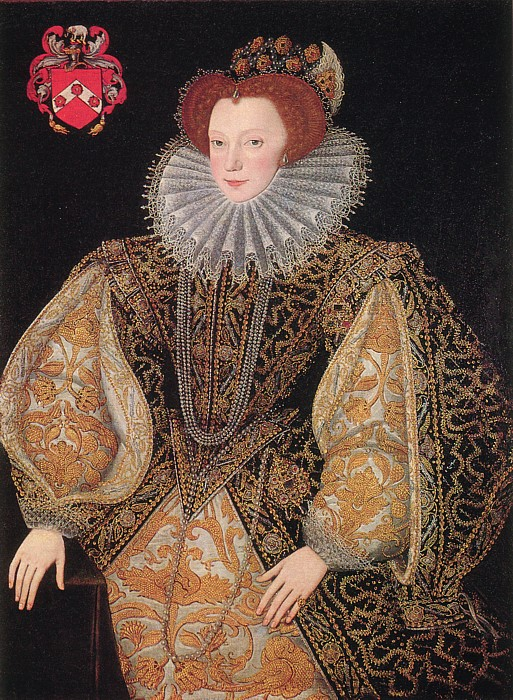
- Lettice Knollys as Countess of Leicester, c. 1585 by George Gower
- Born: 8 November 1543; Rotherfield Greys, Oxfordshire, England
- Died: 25 December 1634 (aged 91); Drayton Bassett, Staffordshire, England
- Buried: The Beauchamp Chapel of the Collegiate Church of St Mary, Warwick, Warwickshire, England
- Spouse: Walter Devereux, 1st Earl of Essex (m. 1560; died 1576) Robert Dudley, 1st Earl of Leicester (m. 1578; died 1588) Sir Christopher Blount (m. 1589; died 1601)
- Issue: Penelope Blount, Countess of Devonshire; Dorothy Percy, Countess of Northumberland; Robert Devereux, 2nd Earl of Essex; Walter Devereux; Francis Devereux; Robert Dudley, Lord Denbigh
- Father: Sir Francis Knollys
- Mother: Catherine Carey

Lettice Knollys (/ˈnoʊlz/ NOHLZ, sometimes latinized as Laetitia; 8 November 1543 – 25 December 1634) was an English noblewoman and mother to the courtiers Robert Devereux, 2nd Earl of Essex, and Penelope, Lady Rich. She was Countess of Essex during her first marriage to Walter Devereux, 1st Earl of Essex and became Countess of Leicester after her second marriage to Robert Dudley, Earl of Leicester. She was also the granddaughter of Mary Boleyn, a mistress of Henry VIII and sister to his second wife, Anne Boleyn. With her marriage to the favourite of Elizabeth I, her first cousin once removed, she incurred the Queen's unrelenting displeasure.

A great-niece of Elizabeth's mother, Anne Boleyn, and close to Elizabeth since childhood, Lettice Knollys was introduced early into court life. At 17 she married Walter Devereux, Viscount Hereford, who in 1572 became Earl of Essex. After her husband went to Ireland in 1573, she possibly became involved with Robert Dudley, Earl of Leicester, Elizabeth's longtime favourite. There was plenty of scandalous talk, not least when Essex died in Ireland of dysentery in 1576. On 20 September 1578, Lettice Knollys was married to Leicester in private by his chaplain Humphrey Tyndall. When the Queen was told of the marriage, she banished the Countess permanently from court, effectively curtailing her social life. The couple's only child, Robert Dudley, Lord Denbigh, died at the age of three, to the great grief of his parents and ending all prospects for the continuance of the House of Dudley. Lettice Knollys' union with Leicester was nevertheless a happy one, as was her third marriage to the much younger Sir Christopher Blount, whom she unexpectedly married in 1589 only six months after the Earl's death. She continued to style herself Lady Leicester.

The Countess was left rich under Leicester's will; yet the discharge of his overwhelming debts diminished her wealth. Between 1604 and 1605, she successfully defended her widow's rights in court when her possessions and her good name were threatened by the Earl's illegitimate son, also named Robert Dudley, who claimed that he was his father's legitimate heir, thus implicitly declaring her marriage bigamous. Lettice was always close to her large family circle. Helpless at the political eclipse of her eldest son, Robert Devereux, 2nd Earl of Essex, she lost both him and her third husband when they were executed for treason by Elizabeth in 1601. From the 1590s she lived chiefly in the Staffordshire countryside, where, in reasonably good health until the end, she died at the impressive age of 91 on Christmas Day 1634.

== Family and upbringing ==
Lettice Knollys was born on 8 November 1543 at Rotherfield Greys, Oxfordshire. Her father, Sir Francis Knollys, was a Member of Parliament and acted as Master of the Horse to Prince Edward. Her mother, Catherine Carey, was a daughter of Mary Boleyn, sister to Anne Boleyn. Thus Catherine was Elizabeth I's first cousin, and Lettice Knollys her first cousin once removed. Lettice was the third of her parents' 16 children.

Sir Francis and his wife were Protestants. In 1556 they went to Frankfurt in Germany to escape religious persecution under Queen Mary I, taking five of their children with them. It is unknown whether Lettice was among them, and she may have passed the next few years in the household of Princess Elizabeth, with whom the family had had a close relationship since the mid-1540s. Her parents and the remainder of the family returned to England in January 1559, two months after Elizabeth I's succession. Francis Knollys was appointed Vice-Chamberlain of the Royal Household; Lady Knollys became a senior Lady of the Bedchamber, and her daughter Lettice a Maid of the Privy Chamber.

== First marriage and love affair ==
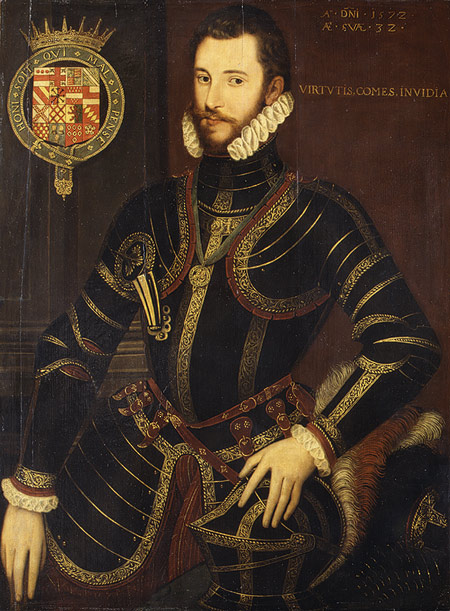
Walter Devereux, 1st Earl of Essex, Lettice Knollys' first husband in 1572, aged 32

In late 1560 Lettice Knollys married Walter Devereux, Viscount Hereford. The couple lived at the family seat of Chartley in Staffordshire. Here, the two eldest of their five children, the daughters Penelope and Dorothy, were born in 1563 and 1564, respectively. Lettice Devereux returned to court on at least one occasion, in the summer of 1565, when the Spanish ambassador Diego Guzmán de Silva described her as "one of the best-looking ladies of the court" and as a favourite with the Queen. Pregnant with her first son, she flirted with Robert Dudley, Earl of Leicester, the Queen's favourite. The Queen found out at once and succumbed to a fit of jealousy. The Viscountess retired to Herefordshire where, in November 1565, she gave birth to Robert, later 2nd Earl of Essex. Two more sons followed: Walter, who was born in 1569, and Francis, who died soon after birth at an unknown date.

Lettice's husband was raised to the earldom of Essex in 1572. In 1573 he successfully suggested to the Queen a project to plant Englishmen in Ulster. In the autumn he went to Ireland, not to return for two years. During this time Lettice Devereux possibly engaged in a love affair with the Earl of Leicester; her whereabouts in the following years are largely unknown, though. In 1573 Leicester sent her a present of venison at Chartley from his seat Kenilworth Castle in Warwickshire, and she made hunting visits to Kenilworth in 1574 and 1576. She was also present in July 1575 when Dudley entertained the Queen with a magnificent 19-day festival at the castle. Elizabeth and the court (including the Earl of Leicester) then progressed to Chartley, where they were welcomed by the Countess of Essex.

When Walter Devereux returned to England in December 1575, the Spanish agent in London, Antonio de Guaras, reported:

As the thing is publicly talked of in the streets, there can be no harm in my writing openly about the great enmity between the Earl of Leicester and the Earl of Essex, in consequence, it is said, of the fact that while Essex was in Ireland his wife had two children by Leicester. ... Great discord is expected in consequence.

These rumours were elaborated on years later in Leicester's Commonwealth, a Catholic underground libel against the Protestant Earl of Leicester that satirically detailed his alleged enormities. Here the Countess of Essex, after having a daughter by Leicester, kills a second child "cruelly and unnaturally" by abortion to prevent her homecoming husband from discovering her affair. There is no evidence that any such children ever existed.

The Earl of Essex returned to Ireland in July 1576. At Dublin, he died of dysentery on 22 September during an epidemic, bemoaning the "frailness of women" in his last words. Rumours of poison, administered by Leicester, immediately sprang up and continued, notwithstanding an official investigation which concluded that Essex had died of natural causes. His body was carried over to Carmarthen, where his widow attended the funeral.

The Countess' jointure, the lands left to her under her husband's will, was too little to live by and did not comprise Chartley, so that she and her children had to seek accommodation elsewhere. She partly lived in her father's house at Rotherfield Greys, but also with friends; Leicester's Commonwealth claimed that Leicester had her move "up and down the country from house to house by privy ways". She pleaded for an augmentation of her jointure with the authorities and, to reach a compromise with the late Earl's executors, threatened "by some froward advice" to claim her dower rights. These would have amounted to one third of the Devereux estate. After seven months of wrangling, she reached a more satisfactory settlement, the Countess declaring to be "content to respect my children more than myself". She equally—though unsuccessfully—tried to move the Queen to forgive Essex' debts to the Crown, which very much burdened the inheritance of her son, the young Earl of Essex.

== Marriage to Leicester and banishment from court ==
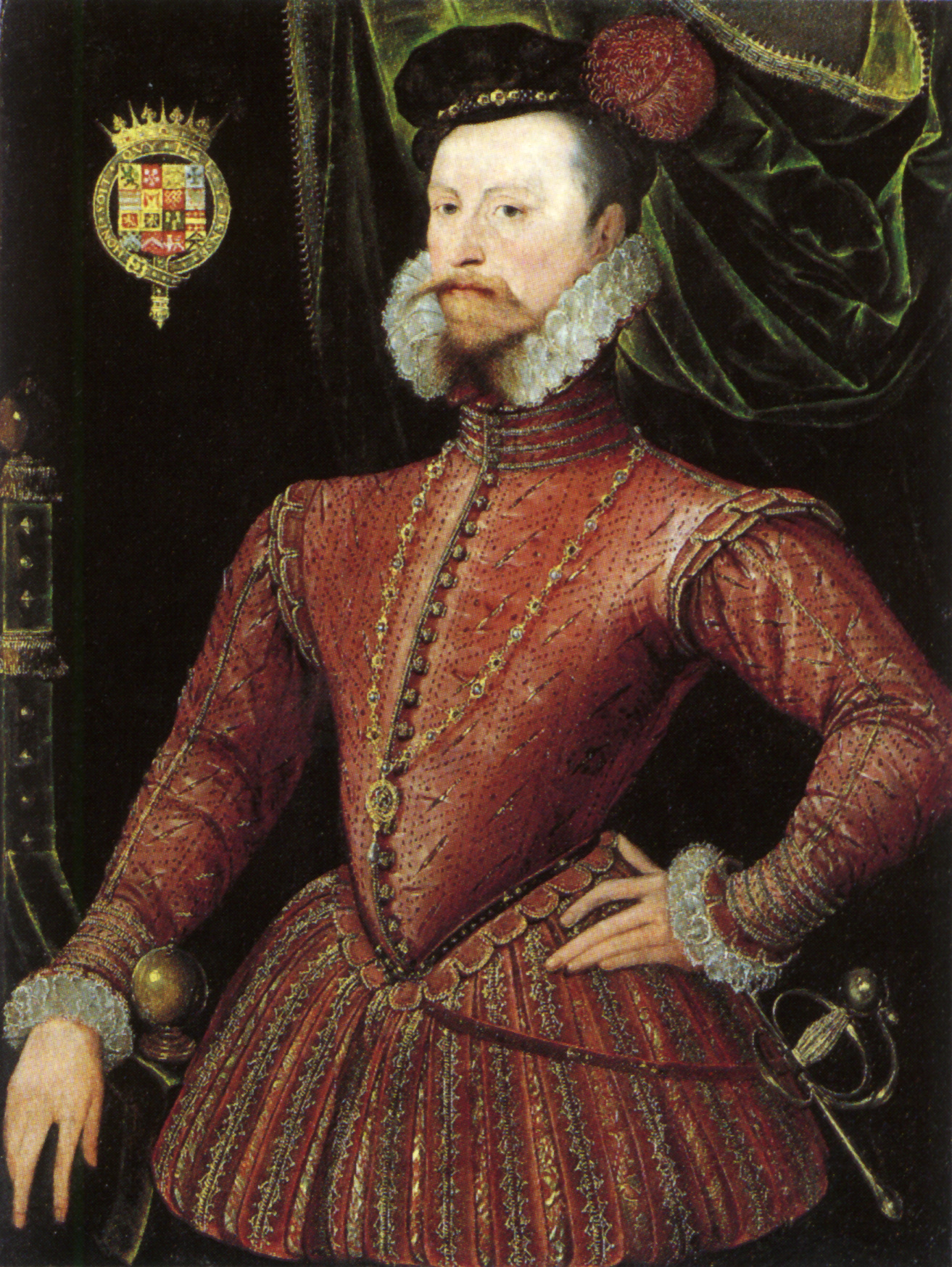
Robert Dudley, Earl of Leicester, 1575, aged about 43

Lettice Knollys married Robert Dudley, Earl of Leicester on 21 September 1578 at around seven o'clock in the morning. Only six other people were present at the Earl's country house of Wanstead Hall in Essex; among these were the bride's father and brother, Francis and Richard Knollys; the bridegroom's brother, Ambrose, Earl of Warwick; and his two friends, the Earl of Pembroke and Lord North. The officiating chaplain Humphrey Tyndall later remarked that the bride wore a "loose gown" (an informal morning dress), which has triggered modern speculation that she was pregnant and that the ceremony happened under pressure from her father. (Note: For example, by Elizabeth Jenkins in 1961 (Jenkins 2002 p. 236) and Derek Wilson in 1981 (Adams 2008a). The marriage events were detailed in witness depositions by the guests before a notary on 13 March 1581 to secure the legitimacy of the child which the Countess of Leicester was carrying. They include the chaplain's observation about her dress (Adams 2008a).) The marriage was, however, in planning between Leicester and his wedding guests for almost a year. While Lettice Devereux may well have been pregnant, there is no further indication as to this. The marriage date coincided with the end of the customary two-years-mourning for a widow.

Leicester—a widower since 1560—had for many years been in hope of marrying Elizabeth herself, "for whose sake he had hitherto forborne marriage", as he confessed to Lord North. He feared Elizabeth's reaction and insisted that his marriage be kept a secret. It did not remain one for long, the French ambassador, Michel de Castelnau, reporting it two months later. When the Queen was told of the marriage the next year, she banished Lettice Dudley permanently from court; she never forgave her cousin, nor could she ever accept the marriage. Even Lady Leicester's movements through London were resented by the Queen, let alone summer visits to Kenilworth by husband and wife.

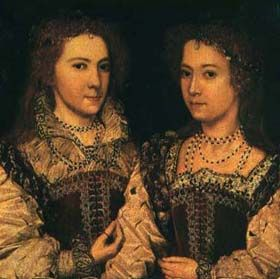
Dorothy and Penelope Devereux, the daughters of Lettice Knollys, c. 1580

Lettice Dudley continued to style herself Countess of Essex for several years into her new marriage. She lived very discreetly, often with her relatives at the Knollys family home in Oxfordshire. In February 1580 she was expecting the birth of a child there. For the birth of Leicester's heir, Robert, Lord Denbigh, in June 1581, she moved to Leicester House on the Strand. A further advanced pregnancy was reported in September 1582 by the French ambassador, yet the outcome is again unknown. The next year Lettice Dudley became officially resident at Leicester House, and Elizabeth was once again furious with the Earl "about his marriage, for he opened the same more plainly than ever before". A few weeks later Michel de Castelnau was a guest at Leicester's palatial mansion: "He especially invited me to dine with him and his wife, who has much influence over him and who he introduces only to those to whom he wishes to show a particular mark of attention."

Robert Dudley had been close to the Knollys family since the early 1550s; several of Lettice's brothers had been in his service, and his marriage only enhanced his relations with her siblings. To his four stepchildren he was a concerned and generous stepfather. The Dudleys' domestic life is partly documented in the Earl's accounts. Lettice Dudley financed her personal expenses and servants out of her revenue as Dowager Countess of Essex, and remained largely excluded from society life.

The three-year-old Lord Denbigh died suddenly on 19 July 1584 at Wanstead. His death shattered the hopes of a dynasty for the House of Dudley. Leicester stayed away from his court duties for a few weeks "to comfort my sorrowful wife for the loss of my little son, whom God has lately taken from us." He thanked Lord Burghley for—unsuccessfully—pleading with the Queen "on behalf of my poor wife. For truly my Lord, in all reason she is hardly dealt with."

In 1585 Leicester led an English expedition to assist the rebellious United Provinces against Spain. He incurred Elizabeth's wrath when he accepted the title of Governor-General in January 1586. What had especially kindled her fury was a tale that the Countess of Leicester was planning to follow her husband to the Netherlands "with such a train of ladies, and gentlewomen, and such rich coaches, litters, and side-saddles, as Her Majesty had none, and that there should be such a court of ladies, as should far pass Her Majesty's court here." Thomas Dudley, who informed Leicester about these events, stressed that "this information" was "most false". At this same time the Earl was giving his wife authority to handle certain land issues during his absence, implying they had no plans to meet in Holland. William Davison, whom Leicester had sent to explain his doings to the Queen, described a visit to the Countess during the crisis: "I found her greatly troubled with tempestuous news she received from court, but somewhat comforted when she understood how I had proceeded with Her Majesty."

The Earl returned to England in December 1586, but was sent again to the Netherlands in the following June—to the grief of his wife, as the young Earl of Essex remarked in a letter. Leicester eventually resigned his post in December 1587. The Countess was with him when he died unexpectedly, possibly of malaria, on 4 September 1588 at Cornbury Park, Oxfordshire; they had been on their way to Kenilworth and Buxton. The Earl's funeral at Warwick in October 1588 was attended by his widow as well as numerous members of her family circle.

== Blount and Essex ==
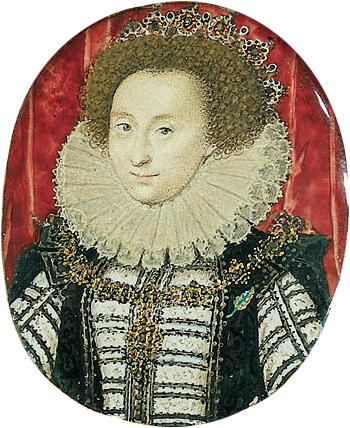
Lettice Knollys, c.1595, by Nicholas Hilliard

Lettice Dudley was left a wealthy widow. Leicester's will appointed her as executrix and her income from both her husbands' jointures amounted to £3,000 annually, to which came plate and movables worth £6,000. However, her jointure was to suffer greatly from paying off Leicester's debts, which at some £50,000 were so overwhelming that she was advised to decline the responsibility of dealing with her husband's financial legacy.

In March or April 1589, hardly six months after Leicester's death, Lettice married Sir Christopher Blount, a relatively poor Catholic soldier 12 years her junior, who had been the Earl of Leicester's Gentleman of the Horse and a trusted friend of his. The marriage was a great surprise, and the Earl of Essex complained that it was an "unhappy choice". In the face of tittle-tattle that had reached even France, Lady Leicester—she continued to be styled thus—explained her choice with being a defenceless widow; like her marriage to Leicester, the union proved to be a "genuinely happy" one. Some 60 years later, it was claimed in a satirical poem that she had poisoned the Earl of Leicester on his deathbed, thereby forestalling her own murder at his hands, because he had found out about her supposed lover, Sir Christopher Blount.

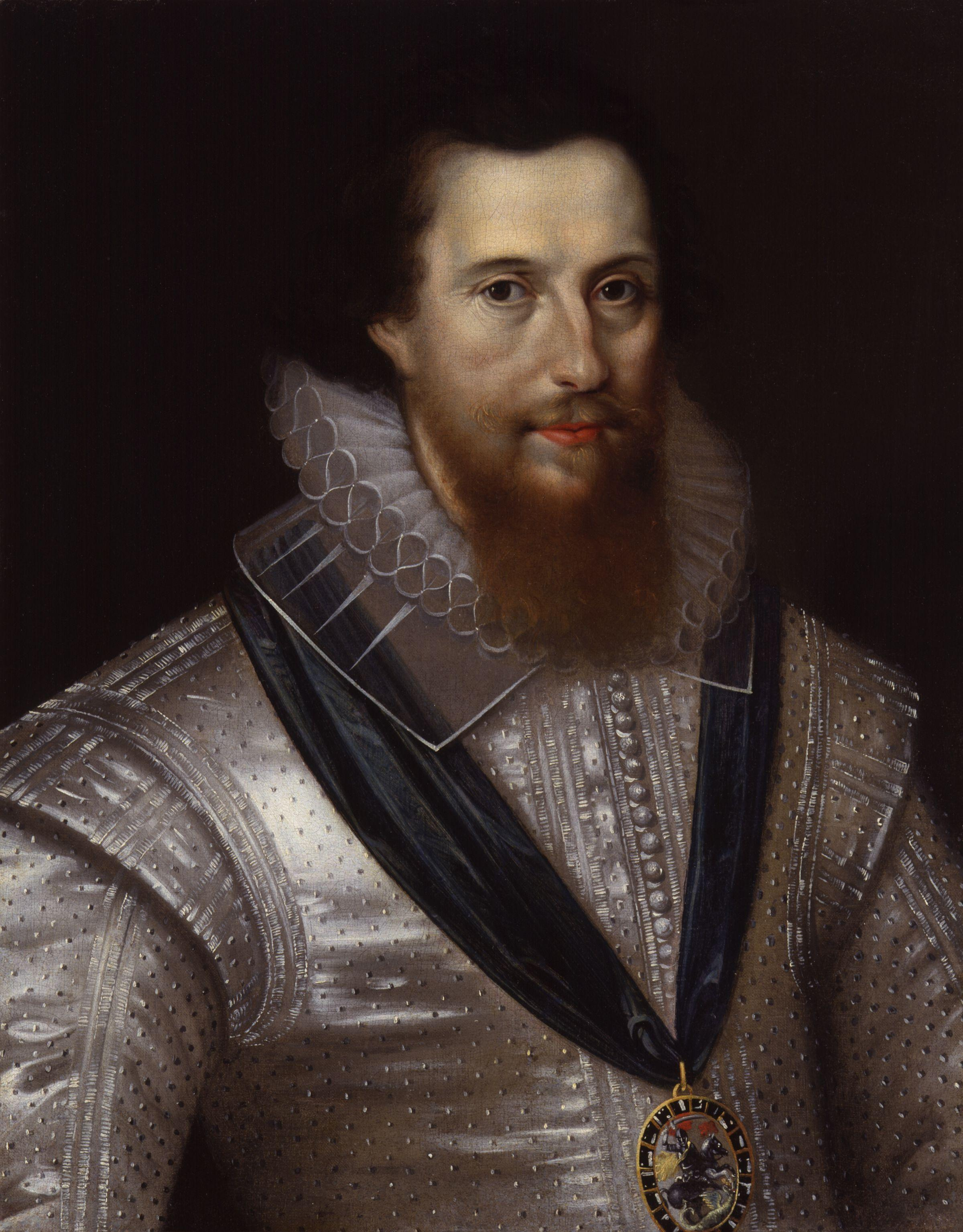
Lettice's eldest son, Robert Devereux, 2nd Earl of Essex, c. 1596

Lettice's second son, Walter Devereux, died 1591 in France while on military duty at the siege of Rouen and in subsequent years she was anxious for her elder son's safety. She addressed him "Sweet Robin", longing for his letters and helpless about his moodiness and depression. In 1593, she sold Leicester House to him, after which it became known as Essex House. She moved to Drayton Bassett near Chartley in Staffordshire, which would be her main residence for the rest of her life. Still banished from court, she saw no point in returning to London without being reconciled to Elizabeth. In December 1597, having heard from friends that "Her Majesty is very well prepared to hearken to terms of pacification", she prepared to do "a winter journey" if her son thought "it be to any purpose". "Otherwise a country life is fittest for disgraced persons", she commented. She travelled to London, staying at Essex House from January till March 1598, and seeking a reconciliation with Elizabeth. At last a short meeting was granted, in which the Countess kissed the Queen and "the Queen kissed her", but nothing really changed.

Essex was imprisoned in 1599 after returning from his command in Ireland without licence; his mother came to London to intercede for him with the Queen. She tried to send Elizabeth a present in the form of a gown, which Elizabeth neither accepted nor refused. Her efforts to get sight of her son made matters worse: "Mislike is taken that his mother and friends have been in a house that looks into York Garden where he uses to walk, and have saluted each other out of a window." Both his military incompetence and his de facto abandonment of his post were condoned on that occasion, but rather than count his blessings and hold his peace, he became malcontent, chafed at his failures, and fell into rebellion. During Essex' revolt, trial, and execution in February 1601, Lettice remained at Drayton Basset. The event was a comprehensive personal disaster for her, because she lost not only her son but also her beloved third husband, who was, she wrote, her "best friend". Sir Christopher Blount was executed on 18 March 1601, three weeks after the execution of his stepson, to whom he had been a friend and confidant for many years. Sir Christopher had taken in as his ward Mary Cresswell and after he died she was looked after by Lettice. Lettice was alarmed when she discovered that Cresswell was set on becoming a nun. With the aid of her chaplain she close to brainwashed the child until she finally accepted the Protestant faith. Cresswell's life story would in time be well known.

== Litigation and old age ==
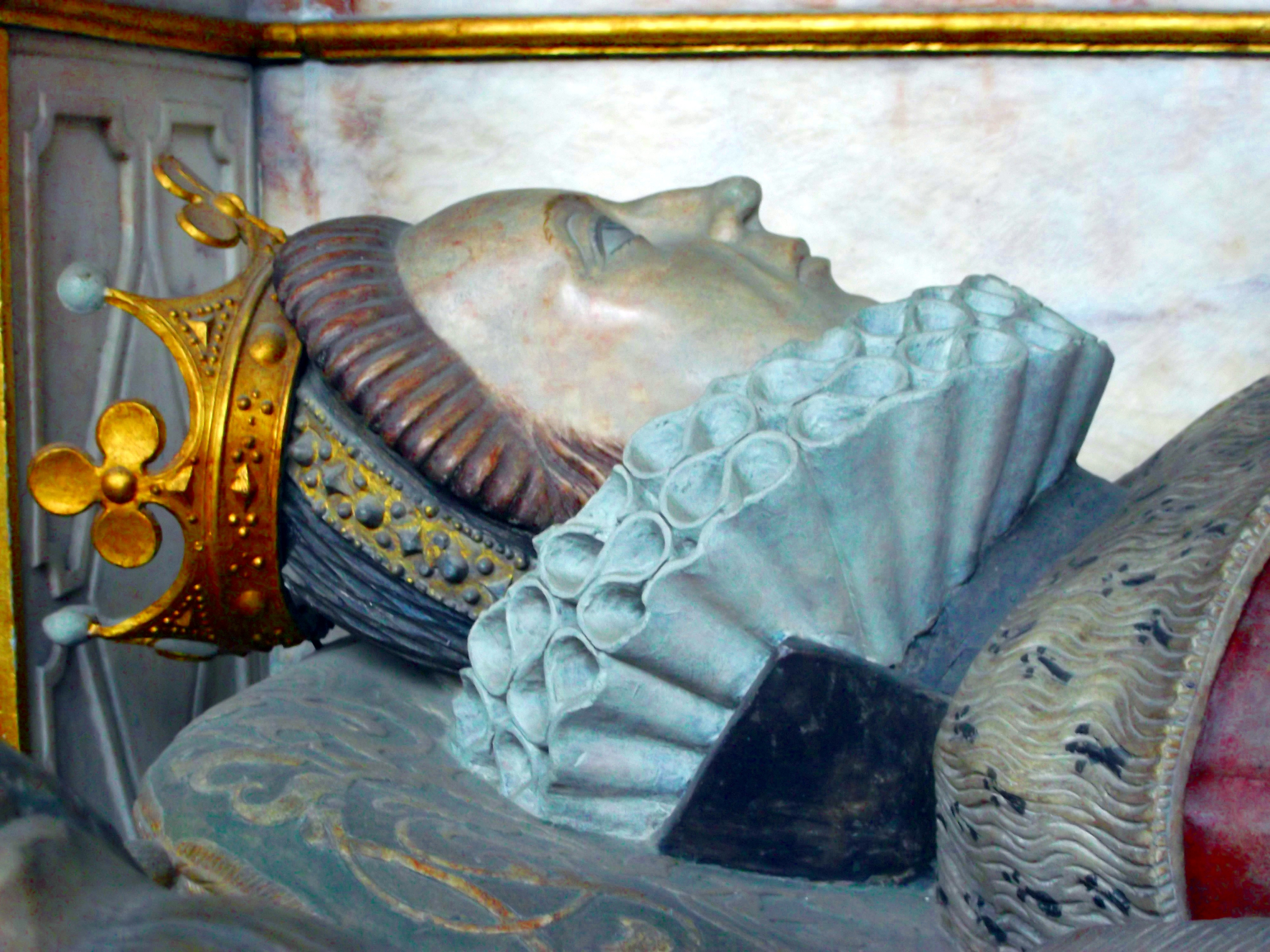
Effigy of Lettice Knollys, Collegiate Church of St Mary, Warwick

The executions and attainders of Essex and Blount led to a legal dispute over the Countess of Leicester's remaining property. In this context she claimed that Blount, in the process of paying off Leicester's debts, had squandered her jewels and much of her landed wealth. The death of Elizabeth I in 1603 meant some form of rehabilitation for the Countess; the new monarch, James I, not only restored her grandson, the third Earl of Essex, to his father's title and estate, but quickly cancelled the rest of her debts to the Crown, almost £4,000.

Even more than his debts, the Earl of Leicester's will triggered litigation. He had intended his illegitimate son from his early 1570s relationship with Douglas Sheffield, the adolescent Robert Dudley, to inherit Kenilworth after the death of his brother, Ambrose Dudley, 3rd Earl of Warwick. Some of the countess' jointure manors lay in the castle's vicinity, while at the same time they had been assigned to the younger Dudley's inheritance by the overseers of Leicester's will. After Warwick's death in February 1590, lengthy legal proceedings ensued over whether particular parts of Lady Leicester's jointure belonged to the Kenilworth estate or not.

In 1603, Dudley initiated moves to prove that he was the legitimate son of his parents and thus the heir to the earldoms of Warwick and Leicester. If successful, this claim would not only have implied that Lettice Knollys' union with Leicester had been bigamous, but have nullified her jointure rights.

Consequently, in February 1604, she filed a complaint against Dudley in the Star Chamber, accusing him of defamation. She was backed by Sir Robert Sidney, who considered himself the only legitimate heir of his uncles Leicester and Warwick. During the Star Chamber proceedings 56 former servants and friends of the Earl of Leicester testified that he had always regarded Dudley as his illegitimate son. The other side was unable to cite clear evidence and the King's chief minister, Robert Cecil, thought it unwise to rake up the existing property settlement, so the outcome was in favour of Lady Leicester. All the evidence was impounded to preclude a resumption of the case.

Throughout her life, Lettice Knollys cared for her siblings, children, and grandchildren. Until their respective deaths in 1607 and 1619, her daughters Penelope and Dorothy were her closest companions. Her grandson, the young third Earl of Essex, also called Robert, shared much of his life with the old Countess at Chartley and Drayton Bassett.

Still walking a mile a day at nearly 90, she died in her chair on Christmas morning, 25 December 1634, aged 91. She had outlived all her children. Widely mourned as a symbol of a by-gone age, she wished to be buried "at Warwick by my dear lord and husband the Earl of Leicester with whom I desire to be entombed". Her request was respected and she came to rest in the Beauchamp Chapel of Collegiate Church of St Mary, Warwick, opposite the tomb of her son, young Lord Denbigh.

== Ancestry ==
Ancestors of Lettice Knollys

8. Robert Knollys
4. Sir Robert Knollys
9. Elizabeth Troutbeck
2. Sir Francis Knollys
10. Sir Thomas Penystone
5. Lettice Penystone
11. Alice Bulstrode
1. Lettice Knollys
12. Sir Thomas Carey
6. William Carey
13. Margaret Spencer
3. Catherine Carey
14. Thomas Boleyn, 1st Earl of Wiltshire
7. Mary Boleyn
15. Elizabeth Howard

== Descendants ==
An episode of the genealogical television series Who Do You Think You Are? traced British comedian Josh Widdicombe's ancestry in direct line to Knollys, via his grandmother, a member of the Barings family.

== See also ==
- Cultural depictions of Elizabeth I of England
