= Penelope Blount, Countess of Devonshire =

English noblewoman (1563–1607)

Penelope Devereux
- Lady Rich
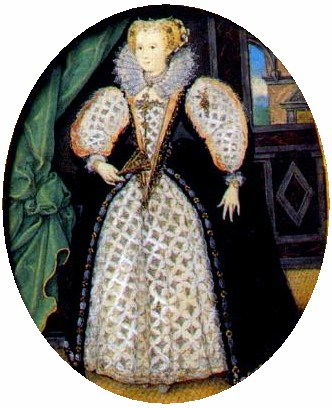
- Portrait miniature thought to be Penelope Devereux, Lady Rich, c.1590 by Nicholas Hilliard
- Born: January 1563; Chartley Castle, Staffordshire, England
- Died: 7 July 1607 (aged 44); London, England
- Noble family: Devereux
- Spouses: Robert Rich, 3rd Baron Rich; Charles Blount, 1st Earl of Devonshire
- Issue: Robert Rich, 2nd Earl of Warwick; Henry Rich, 1st Earl of Holland; Lettice Rich; Essex Rich; Penelope Blount; Isabella /Elizabeth Blount; Mountjoy Blount, 1st Earl of Newport; St John Blount; Charles Blount
- Father: Walter Devereux, 1st Earl of Essex
- Mother: Lettice Knollys

Penelope Rich, Lady Rich, later styled Penelope Blount (née Devereux; January 1563 – 7 July 1607) was an English court office holder. She served as lady-in-waiting to the English queen Anne of Denmark. She was the sister of Robert Devereux, 2nd Earl of Essex, and is traditionally thought to be the inspiration for "Stella" of Sir Philip Sidney's Astrophel and Stella sonnet sequence (published posthumously in 1591). She was married to Robert Rich, 3rd Baron Rich (later 1st Earl of Warwick), and had a public liaison with Charles Blount, Baron Mountjoy, whom she married in an unlicensed ceremony following her divorce from Rich. She died in 1607.

== Early life and first marriage ==
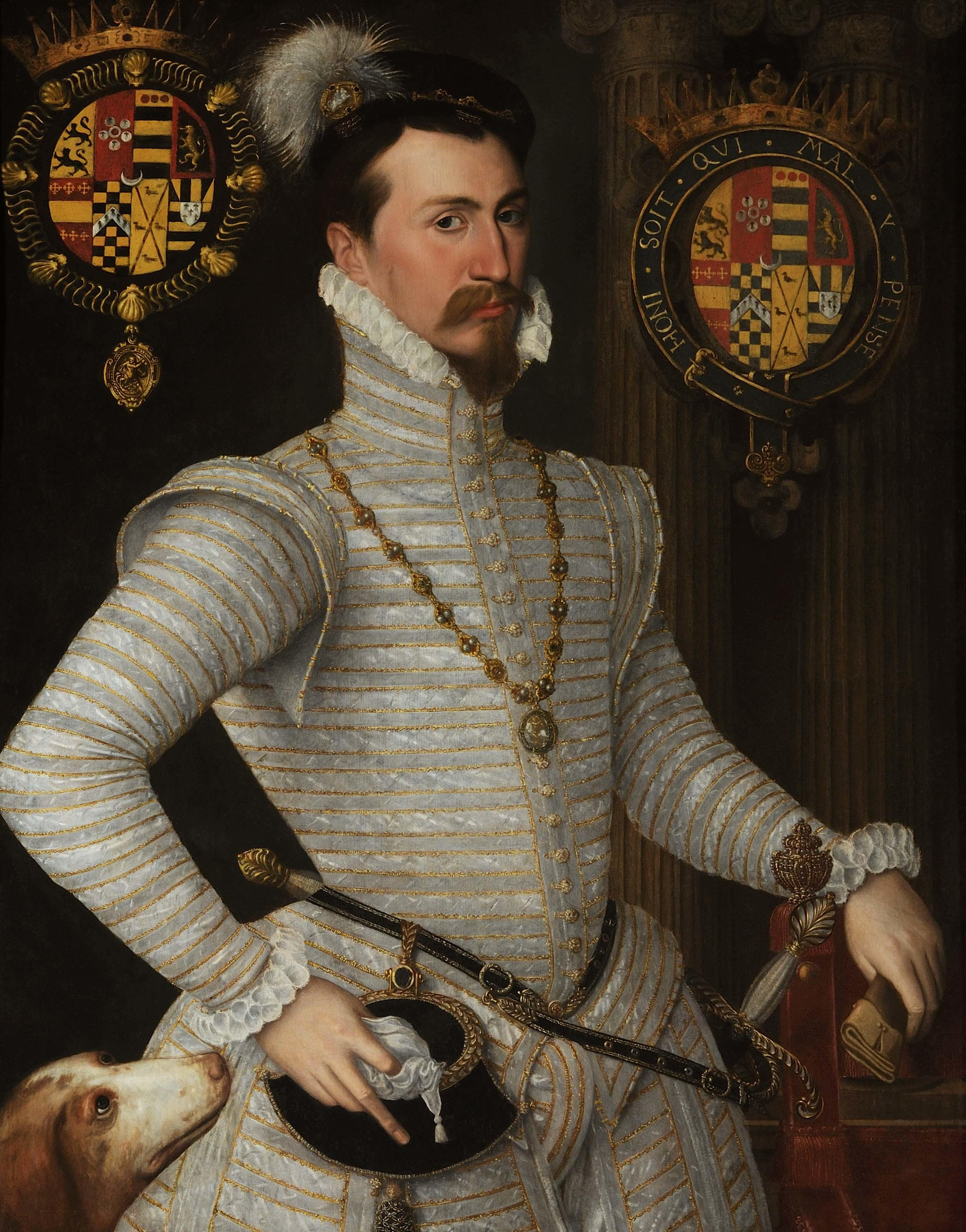
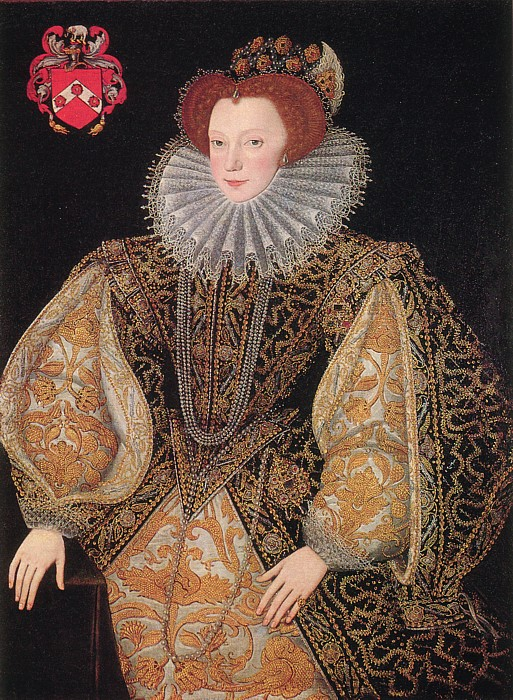
Penelope's stepfather Robert Dudley, 1st Earl of Leicester, and her mother Lettice Knollys.

Penelope was born in January 1563 at Chartley Castle in Staffordshire. She was the elder daughter of Walter Devereux, 2nd Viscount Hereford, later 1st Earl of Essex and Lettice Knollys, daughter of Sir Francis Knollys and Catherine Carey, and sister of William Knollys, later 1st Earl of Banbury. Catherine Carey was the daughter of Lady Mary Boleyn by either her husband Sir William Carey, Gentleman of the Privy Chamber, or her lover King Henry VIII.

Her father was created Earl of Essex in 1572. Penelope was a child of twelve when Sir Philip Sidney accompanied her distant cousin Queen Elizabeth I on a visit to Lady Essex in 1575, on her way from Kenilworth, and must have been frequently thrown into the society of Sidney, in consequence of the many ties between the two families. Essex died in Dublin in September 1576. He had sent a message to Philip Sidney from his death-bed expressing his desire that he should marry his daughter, and later his secretary wrote to the young man's father, Sir Henry Sidney, in words which seem to point to the existence of a very definite understanding.

Penelope's brother, Robert, Viscount Hereford, inherited the Earldom of Essex on their father's death in 1576, and Penelope, her sister Dorothy, and younger brother Walter were entrusted to the guardianship of their kinsman Henry Hastings, 3rd Earl of Huntingdon. In 1578 their widowed mother married the Queen's favourite, Robert Dudley, Earl of Leicester. Perhaps the marriage of Lady Essex with the earl of Leicester, which destroyed Philip Sidney's prospects as his uncle Leicester's heir, had something to do with the breaking off of the proposed match with Penelope.

She had a strict Puritan upbringing and quite a simple life until she was presented at Court in early 1581. In January, she arrived at court accompanied by her guardian's wife, Catherine, Countess of Huntingdon, who was Leicester's sister and Sidney's aunt. In March 1581 Huntingdon as her guardian secured the queen's assent through Lord Burghley, Master of the Court of Wards, for her marriage with Robert Rich, 3rd Baron Rich (later 1st Earl of Warwick). Penelope is said to have protested in vain against the alliance with Rich. The marriage was unhappy from the start, and Philip Sidney continued to have an emotional attachment to her until his death in 1586.

Penelope's children by Robert Rich were:

- Lettice Rich (d. 1619), named after her maternal grandmother Lettice Knollys and known as Lucy. Married firstly Sir George Carey and secondly Sir Arthur Lake
- Essex Rich, married Sir Thomas Cheek and had three sons and five daughters
- Robert Rich (1587–1658), later 2nd Earl of Warwick
- Henry Rich (1590–1649), later 1st Earl of Holland

== Poets' muse ==
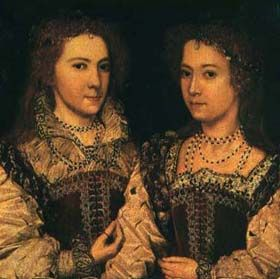
Portrait at Longleat House believed to be of Dorothy and Penelope Devereux c. 1581

Penelope Rich was considered one of the beauties of Elizabeth's court. She was golden-haired with dark eyes, a gifted singer and dancer, fluent in French, Italian, and Spanish.

Penelope is traditionally thought to have inspired Philip Sidney's sonnet sequence Astrophel and Stella (sometimes spelt Astrophil and Stella). Likely composed in the 1580s, it is the first of the famous English sonnet sequences, and contains 108 sonnets and 11 songs. Many of the poems were circulated in manuscript form before the first edition was printed by Thomas Newman in 1591, five years after Sidney's death. They were set by the French lutenist Charles Tessier and published in London in 1597.

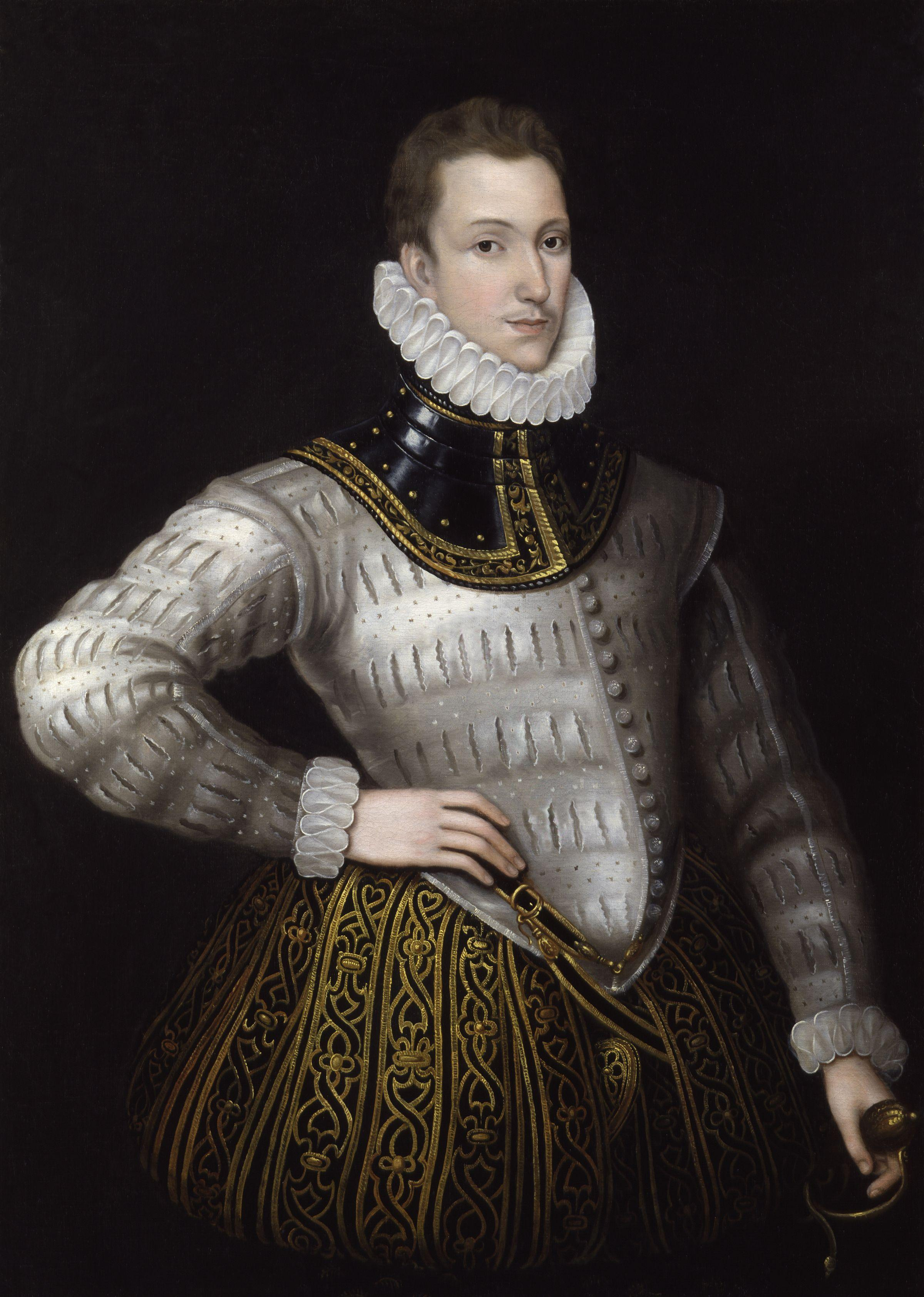
English poet, courtier, diplomat Philip Sidney (1554 – 1586), National Portrait Gallery

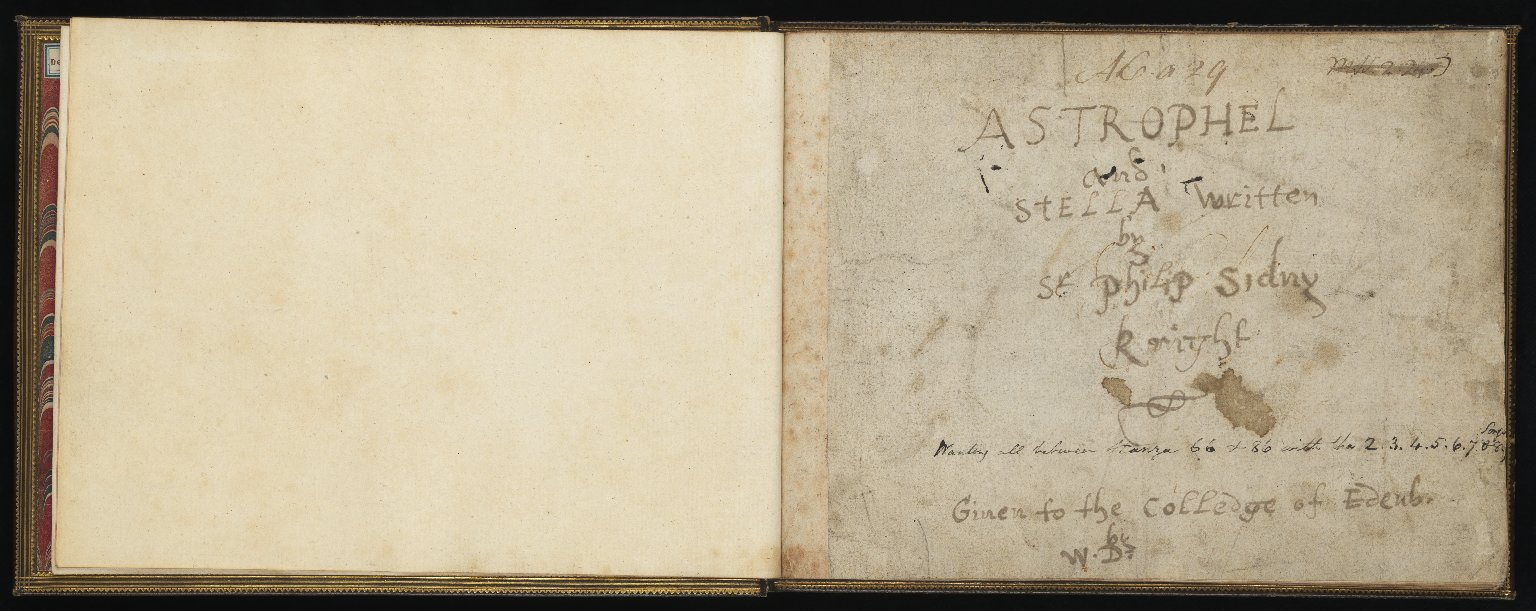
Frontispiece to a copy of Astrophel and Stella. The poems circulated in manuscript form before the first edition was printed in 1591. This edition included ten of Sidney's songs, a preface by Thomas Nashe and verses from other poets including Thomas Campion, Samuel Daniel and Edward de Vere, 17th Earl of Oxford.

Whether Sidney fell passionately in love with Penelope in the years between her arrival at court in 1581 and his own marriage in 1583, or whether the "Stella" sonnets were courtly amusements reflecting fashionable poetic conceits may never be known. In her essay "Sidney, Stella, and Lady Rich", Katherine Duncan-Jones writes:

No one since 1935 has seriously doubted that Sidney intended the first readers of Astropil and Stella, whoever they may have been, to link "Stella" with Lady Rich. The exact nature of Sidney's relationship with the famous beauty is another and much more ticklish matter ..."

Sidney died of wounds received at the Battle of Zutphen in 1586. In 1590, Penelope's brother Essex married Sidney's widow Frances, daughter of Sir Francis Walsingham, and Lady Rich was much cultivated by poets and musicians during her brother's ascendancy at court in the 1590s. Poet Richard Barnfield dedicated The Affectionate Shepherd, his first work, which was published anonymously in November 1594, to Penelope Rich. Bartholomew Yong dedicated his translation of Portuguese author Jorge de Montemor's The Seven Books of the Diana (1598) to her; and sonnets are addressed to her by John Davies of Hereford. She may also be the Stella in the early 17th-century dramatic fragment Comedy of Stella and Alexis attributed to the playwright Arthur Wilson, who was employed in the Devereux household in the early 1620s.

In 1586 she was a godmother to the daughter of Nicholas Hilliard, the queen's miniaturist. Hilliard is known to have painted two miniatures of Lady Rich, in 1589 and 1590 for her brother, the Earl of Essex. He sent one to James VI of Scotland (later James I of England), and the poet Henry Constable wrote a sonnet about the portrait. Essex gave the second miniature to the French ambassador for Henry IV. A miniature in the Royal Collection (above) may be one of these. It was said that Lady Rich wrote to James VI in 1589, saying that Elizabeth could only live a couple of years longer, encouraging his hopes for the English succession. In December 1595, James's consort Anne of Denmark asked for portraits of the Earl of Essex and Lady Rich.

Charles Tessier dedicated his book of part-songs in French and Italian, Le premier livre de chansons, to "Madame Riche", commending (in Italian) her musical judgement, and John Dowland composed "My Lady Rich's Galliard" in her honour.

== Affair and charge of treason ==
Penelope's arranged marriage to Rich had been unhappy, and by 1595 she began a secret affair with Charles Blount, 8th Baron Mountjoy. Lord Rich took no action during the lifetime of Penelope's brother, the powerful Earl of Essex, who became the ageing Queen's favourite in the years after the death of Leicester in 1588.

However, Penelope became tainted by association with her brother's plotting. Essex shocked many people, after the failure of his rebellion, by denouncing her as a traitor, and after his execution for treason in 1601, Lord Rich had Penelope and her children by Mountjoy cast out. Mountjoy, like Penelope, had been implicated in the Essex rebellion, but the Queen, who wished to show as much clemency as possible to the rebels, took no action against either of them. Lady Rich moved in with her lover, and the couple began a very public relationship. Mountjoy was created Earl of Devonshire on the accession of James I, and Lady Rich was in high favour at court.

She was among the ladies who rode north to Berwick-upon-Tweed to meet Anne of Denmark in May 1603 and escorted the new queen on her entry to London. She served Anne as a Lady of the Bedchamber. The French ambassador the Marquis de Rosny identified her as an influential courtier, and gave her a diamond-set miniature portrait of Henry IV of France. She was one of the ladies in waiting "taken out" from the audience to dance during The Masque of Indian and China Knights at Hampton Court on 1 January 1604. She danced as the nymph Ocyte in Ben Jonson's Masque of Blackness on Twelfth Night 1605.

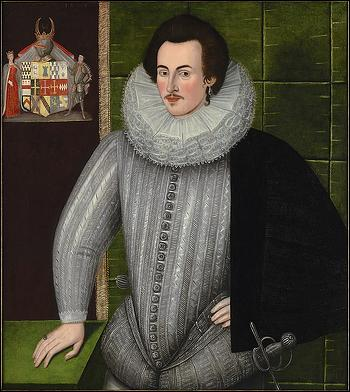
Charles Blount, 8th Baron Mountjoy

In 1605, Rich sued for a divorce, and Penelope wanted to marry Blount and legitimise their children. In the divorce proceedings, she publicly admitted to adultery. The divorce was granted, but the requests to remarry and legitimise her children were refused. On 26 December 1605, she married Blount at Wanstead Hall in London in a private ceremony conducted by his chaplain, William Laud, afterwards Archbishop of Canterbury. This proceeding, carried out in defiance of canon law, was followed by the disgrace of both parties, who were banished from court by King James. The couple continued to live together as husband and wife with their children until his death a few months later. Blount died on 3 April 1606 and Penelope on 7 July 1607.

Penelope's illegitimate children acknowledged by Charles Blount were:

- Penelope Rich (1592-1613) who, despite her surname, was a daughter of Penelope by Blount
- Mountjoy Blount (c.1597–1666), later 1st Earl of Newport
- Charles Rich, who despite his surname, was a son of Penelope by Blount
- St. John Rich (Scipio Riche) (1597- ), who despite his surname, was a son of Penelope by Blount
- Isabella Rich (1595- ), who, despite her surname, was a daughter of Penelope by Blount
- another child died in infancy
