= Christopher Blount =

English military officer and rebel

- Born: 1555/1556
- Died: 18 March 1601; Tower Hill, London
- Cause of death: Beheading
- Resting place: St. Peter ad Vincula, London
- Known for: Soldier and secret agent
- Spouse: Lettice Knollys
- Parent(s): Sir Thomas Blount; Margery Poley

Sir Christopher Blount (1555/1556 – 18 March 1601) was an English soldier, secret agent, and rebel. He served as a leading household officer of Robert Dudley, 1st Earl of Leicester. A Catholic, Blount corresponded with Mary, Queen of Scots's Paris agent, Thomas Morgan, probably as a double agent. After the Earl of Leicester's death he married the Dowager Countess, Lettice Knollys, mother of Robert Devereux, 2nd Earl of Essex. Blount became a comrade-in-arms and confidant of the Earl of Essex and was a leading participant in the latter's rebellion in February 1601. About five weeks later he was beheaded on Tower Hill for high treason.

== Career ==
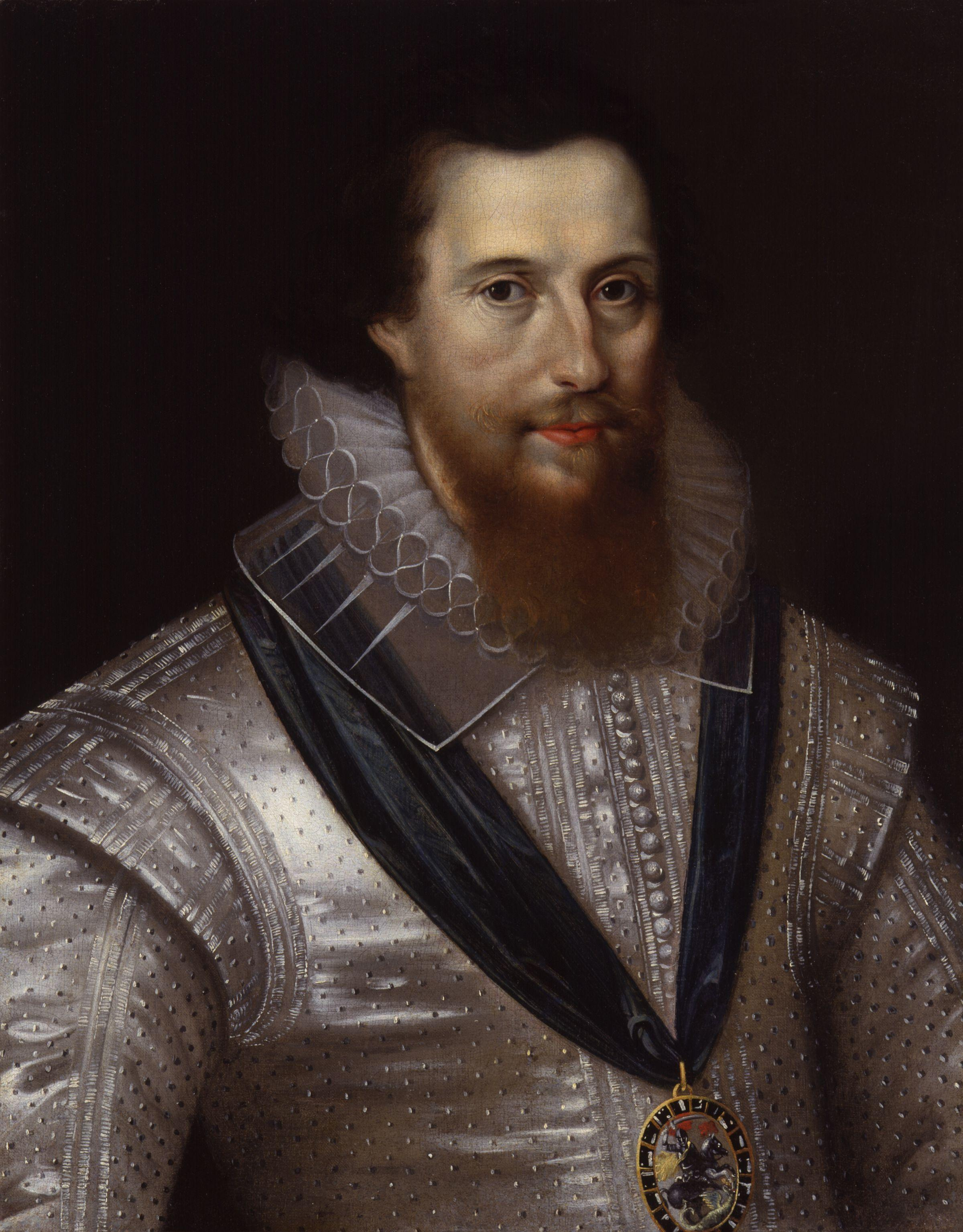
Blount's stepson, the Earl of Essex. Blount was a conspirator in the rebellion of 1601.

Christopher Blount was born in Kidderminster, Worcestershire, the younger son of Thomas Blount, a relative of Robert Dudley, 1st Earl of Leicester on the Earl's mother's side, and one of his chief household officers until his death in 1588. Blount's mother was Margery Poley, daughter of Edmund Poley of Badley. The Poley family of Badley were ardent Catholics in contrast to the Blount family who had adopted the reformed religion. As a child Christopher Blount was sent to Louvain to be privately tutored by William Allen.

Despite being a Catholic, he was Gentleman of the Horse to the Earl of Leicester by 1584. He corresponded with Thomas Morgan in Paris, the exiled agent of Mary, Queen of Scots. Apparently Blount offered to "do [her] notable service". In his dealings with Morgan, Blount probably had the backing of Leicester and Francis Walsingham, Queen Elizabeth's spymaster. Leicester trusted Blount, calling him "Mr. Kytt" and caring for his well-being. Blount served in the Netherlands Campaign from 1585 till 1587, when Leicester was Governor-General there.

In the spring of 1589, about seven months after the Earl's death, Blount married the Earl's widow, Lettice Knollys, whom Queen Elizabeth reportedly hated for having married the Earl of Leicester. Accordingly, Robert Devereux, 2nd Earl of Essex, Lettice's son and the new favourite of the Queen, termed this an "unhappy choice". Lettice seems to have been very happy with her choice, as is shown by her later correspondence. Lady Leicester (she continued to be styled thus) and Sir Christopher were busy repaying the Earl of Leicester's colossal debts and were engaged in numerous lawsuits because of this.

Blount was Member of Parliament for Staffordshire, where he lived, in the Parliaments of 1593 and 1597; he was elected at the insistence of the Earl of Essex, who was influential in the county. In 1596, Blount was a colonel in the Cádiz expedition, and in 1597 in that to the Azores. One of the main followers of the Earl of Essex, he became much involved in the latter's rebellion in 1601.

On Sunday, 8 February, he tried to raise London, riding side by side with his stepson, the Earl, and was badly wounded in the cheek. Following his arrest, he was carried on a litter to his trial, still weak from his injury. He was beheaded about four weeks after Essex on Tower Hill for high treason.
