= Edward Cary =

English courtier and Master of the Jewel Office

Sir Edward Cary
- Died: 1618; London, England
- Spouse: Katherine Knyvett
- Children: Henry Cary, 1st Viscount Falkland; Philip Cary (MP for Woodstock); Adolphus Cary; Philip Cary; Katherine Cary; Frances Cary; Elizabeth Cary; Meriel Cary; Anne Cary; Jane Cary
- Parents: John Carey (father); Joyce Denny (mother)
- Relatives: Edmund Denny (grandfather); Francis Walsingham (half-brother)

Sir Edward Cary or Carey (died 1618) was an English courtier and Master of the Jewel Office for Elizabeth I and James VI and I.

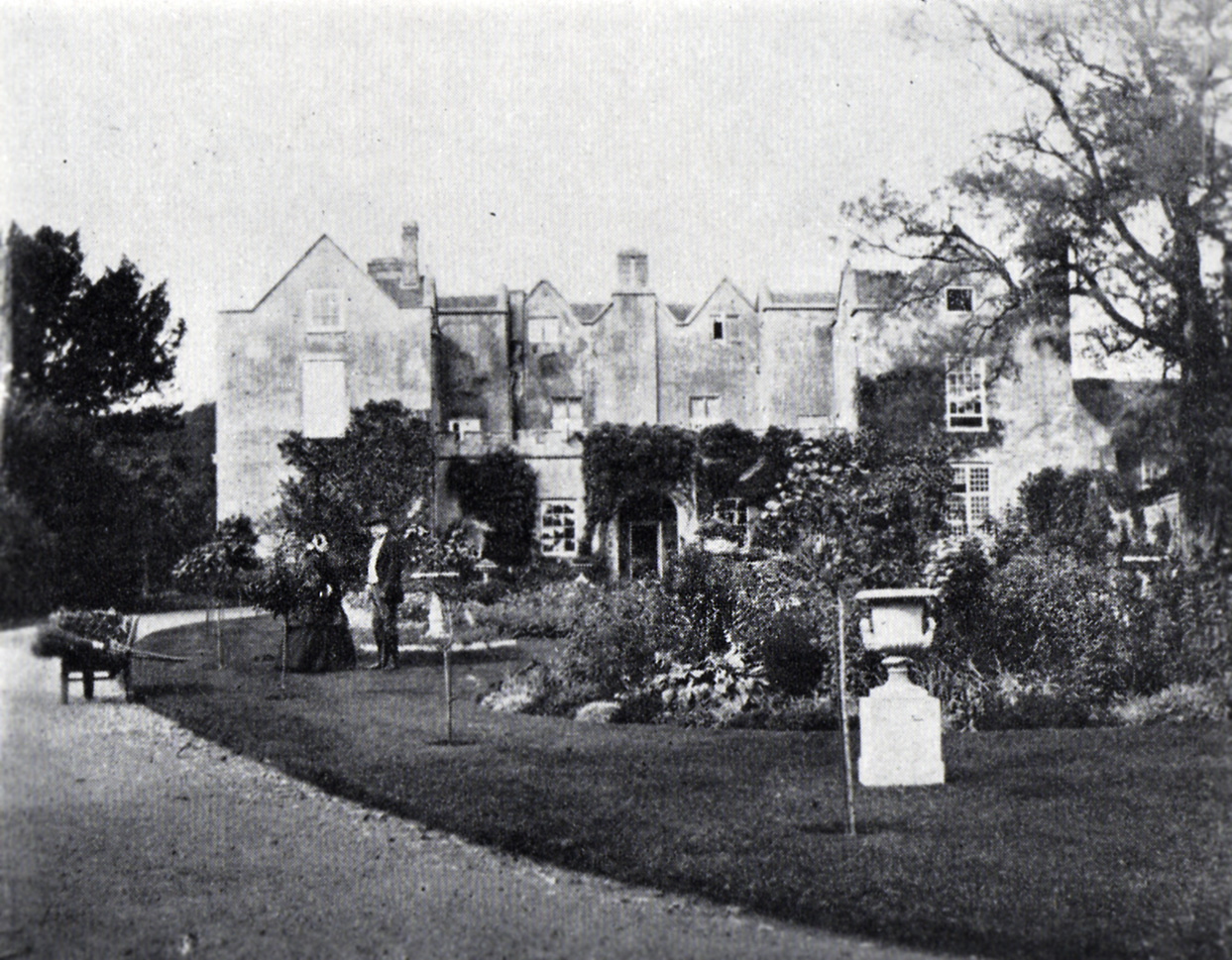
Berkhamsted Place (demolished)

== Family background ==
He was a son of John Cary or Carey of Pleshey (died 1551) and Joyce, daughter of Edmund Denny, and widow of William Walsingham. His homes were at Berkhamsted Place and Aldenham, Hertfordshire. He bought Aldenham from Paul Stepney in 1588. Both houses have been demolished.

In 1560, his mother bequeathed silver plate and a velvet bed tester to Edward's half-brother Francis Walsingham. His half-sister Mary Walsingham married Walter Mildmay.

== Career ==
He was a Groom of the Privy Chamber, Keeper of Marylebone Park, Master of the Jewel House jointly with John Astley from August 1595, a teller of the exchequer, and was knighted in 1596. He is noted for being a commissioner to investigate concealed church lands which had followed the dissolution of religious institutions earlier in the century.

Cary and Thomas Knyvet were involved in a review of older jewels in 1600 when some pieces were appraised by the goldsmiths Hugh Kayle and Leonard Bush. Some papers and warrants from Cary's tenure at the Jewel House, which passed to Henry Mildmay, are held at the Somerset Heritage Centre. Cary also signed an inventory of Elizabeth's clothes and jewels.

The auditor Francis Gofton noted in December 1604 that the Queen's gold crown and other items weighing in total 53 ounces were kept by Edward Cary.

A February 1606 payment to the goldsmith John Williams includes his supply of gold chains and medallions with the king's portrait remaining "under the charge of Sir Edward Cary, Knight, one of the Jewelhouse". Some of the plate made by Williams, in the style of the Tudor goldsmith Cornelis Hayes and destined as diplomatic gifts, remains in the Kremlin. Auditor Gofton managed the accounts of the disgraced Lord Cobham. He delivered Cobham's "garter" and "George" jewels to Cary in March 1605.

Cary died on 18 July 1618 in London at Cary House in Great Bartholomew's, West Smithfield, and was buried at Aldenham in the chancel of St John the Baptist on 6 August.

== Marriage and children ==
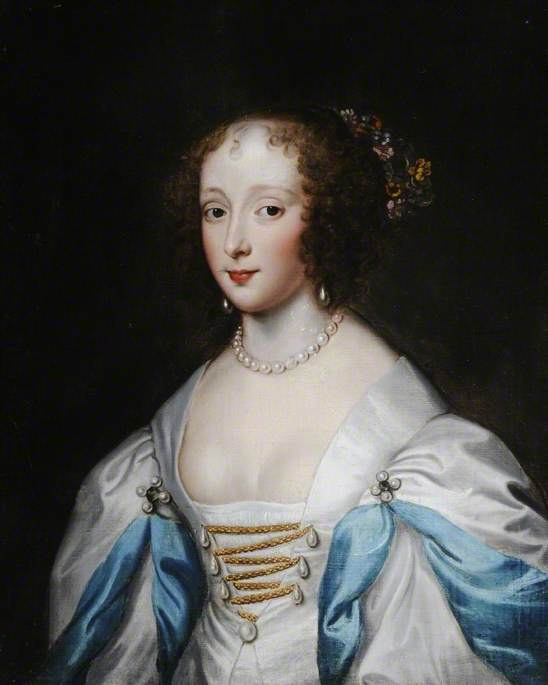
Jane Cary, by Cornelius Johnson

He married Katherine Knyvett (1543–1622), a daughter of Sir Henry Knevet or Knyvett (died 1546) and his wife Anne Pickering, and widow of Henry Paget, 2nd Baron Paget. She was a sister of his colleague at court, Thomas Knyvett, and was known as the "Baroness Paget Cary". Their children included:

- Henry Cary, 1st Viscount Falkland, who was Master of Jewel House jointly with his father. He married Elizabeth Tanfield in 1602.
- Philip Cary (MP for Woodstock), his eldest daughter was Miriall Cary (1610–1611).
- Adolphus Cary (died 1609), married Anne Corbett (died 1601) in August 1596. A member of the Earl of Nottingham's embassy to Spain in 1605. He was the subject of an epitaph by John Davies of Hereford, addressed to his brother, Philip Cary. His death from smallpox was investigated by the College of Physicians. William Paddy was exonerated and Dr Antoine was censured.
- Philip Cary (died 1631), married Elizabeth Bland
- Katherine Cary, who married Henry Longueville of Wolverton in January 1597.
- Frances Cary, who married (1) Ralph Baesh of Stansted Bury (a son of Edward Baeshe and grandson of Ralph Sadler), and (2) in March 1605, George Manners, 7th Earl of Rutland. In 1622, her mother, Katherine, Lady Paget, left her the new canopy and couch from her bedchamber.
- Elizabeth Cary, who married John Savile, 1st Baron Savile of Pontefract
- Meriel Cary (died 1600), who married Thomas Crompton of Hounslow and Skerne in October 1597, Elizabeth I wrote to her mother, to "good Kate", on the occasion of her death. She is commemorated by a wall monument at Aldenham. In December 1616, their daughter Catherine Crompton (born 1599), married Thomas Lyttleton of Hagley (his mother was Meriel Lyttelton).
- Anne Cary (born 1585), who married Francis Leke, 1st Earl of Scarsdale in September 1607.
- Jane Cary, who married Edward Barrett, 1st Lord Barrett of Newburgh.

Edward Cary, by his will, left his gold buttons to be divided between his two younger daughters Manners and Barrett. His widow continued to known as Katherine, Lady Paget. She died in 1622. In her will, she left her new fashionable couch and canopy to her daughter Lady Manners, and her cabinet to Lady Leke.
