= Martha Denny =

English Catholic recusant (c.1500–1572)

Lady Carew Martha Denny
- Born: c. 1500; Cheshunt, Hertfordshire
- Died: 9 January 1572 (aged 71–72); London
- Known for: Recusant
- Spouse: Sir Wymond Carew (m. 1519; died 1549)
- Children: Thomas Carew; Sir Matthew Carew; Prudence Carew; Elizabeth Carew; 15 more
- Parents: Sir Edmund Denny; Mary Troutbeck
- Relatives: Sir Anthony Denny (brother); Sir Francis Walsingham (nephew); Richard Carew (grandson); Sir George Carew (grandson)
- Family: Denny

Martha Carew (née Denny; c. 1500 – 9 January 1572) was an English Catholic recusant, sent to prison in 1562 for having attended mass. Her husband was Sir Wymond Carew, by whom she had 19 children, including lawyer Sir Matthew Carew.

== Family and marriage ==
Martha was born at Cheshunt, Hertfordshire in about 1500. She was the eldest daughter of Sir Edmund Denny, Chief Baron of the Exchequer, and his 2nd wife, Mary Troutbeck of Bridge Trafford, Cheshire. Her brother was Sir Anthony Denny, a leading member of the Privy Chamber, and a confidant of King Henry VIII of England.

She married, by July 1519, Sir Wymond Carew of Antony, Cornwall, by whom she had 19 children, an unknown number of whom survived to adulthood, including:

- Thomas Carew (1527 – 12 February 1565)
- Roger Carew
- George Carew
- John Carew
- Sir Matthew Carew (1531–1618), lawyer; married Alice Rivers, by whom he had issue.
- Anthony Carew
- Harvey Carew
- Prudence Carew married Anthony Brugge or Bridges of West Ham. Anthony was the son of Giles Brugge of West Ham (d. 1557) and Helianor Robbins and grandson of Sir John Brugge (or Bruges), Alderman, Draper and Lord Mayor of London, 1520–1521.
- Temperance Carew (1537 – 9 October 1577)
- Elizabeth Carew (died March 1578/1579) married George Dacres of Cheshunt, Hertfordshire (1534 -30 September 1580)

Sir Wymond was the treasurer of King Henry's fourth and sixth wives, Anne of Cleves and Catherine Parr.

The Carews lived in extravagant style at their residences in Bletchingley, Surrey, Hertfordshire, and Hackney. When her husband died on 22 August 1549, Martha was left with debts totalling £8,000. As she was unable to pay what was in the 16th century a large sum of money, the manor at Hackney as well as other lands passed to the Crown in 1554.

== Recusancy ==
Following the loss of her home at Hackney, Denny moved to London, where on 8 September 1562, she was arrested for having attended a Roman Catholic mass. After being tried and convicted, she refused to pay the required fine of 100 marks and was sent to prison for six months. On 4 April 1568, she was arrested a second time for the same offence; this time, however, she received a pardon from Queen Elizabeth.

Martha Denny died on 9 January 1572, probably in London.
