= Margaret Spencer =

British noble (1472–1536)

Margaret Spencer Lady Carey
- Born: 1472
- Died: 1536 (aged 63–64)
- Spouse: Sir Thomas Carey
- Issue: John Carey; Anne Carey; William Carey; Margaret Carey; Eleanor Carey; Edward Carey; Mary Carey
- Father: Robert Spencer of Spencer Combe
- Mother: Eleanor Beaufort

Margaret (or Eleanor) Spencer (1472–1536) was the daughter of Sir Robert Spencer, of Spencer Combe in the parish of Crediton, Devon, by his wife Lady Eleanor Beaufort, the daughter of Edmund Beaufort, 2nd Duke of Somerset, and Lady Eleanor Beauchamp.

== Marriage and issue ==
In 1490 she married Sir Thomas Cary or Carey (1455-1500), of Chilton Foliat, in Wiltshire, second son of Sir William Cary (1437-1471) of Cockington, Devon, by his second wife, Alice (or Anna) Fulford, a daughter of Sir Baldwin Fulford (d. 1476) of Great Fulford, Devon. They had eight children:

- Sir John Carey, of Plashey (1491–1552), married Joyce Denny (1495–1559). She was the daughter of Sir Edmund Denny, of Cheshunt by his second wife, Mary Troutbeck.
- Anne Carey (1493–1550)
- William Carey (1500–1528), Gentleman of the Privy Chamber and Esquire of the Body to King Henry VIII of England, married Mary Boleyn. It is thought that shortly after the marriage, Henry VIII began an affair with Mary, and around this time she gave birth to two children whose parentage is questioned by historians, Henry Carey, 1st Baron Hunsdon and Catherine Carey.
- Margaret Carey (1496–1560)
- Eleanor Carey (died after 1528). She was a nun at Wilton Abbey.
- Daughter Carey. She was a nun at Wilton Abbey.
- Edward Carey (after 1500–1560)
- Mary Carey (1501–1560), married John Delaval, Sheriff of Northumberland (1493–1562).
