= William Cary (1437–1471) =

English gentry

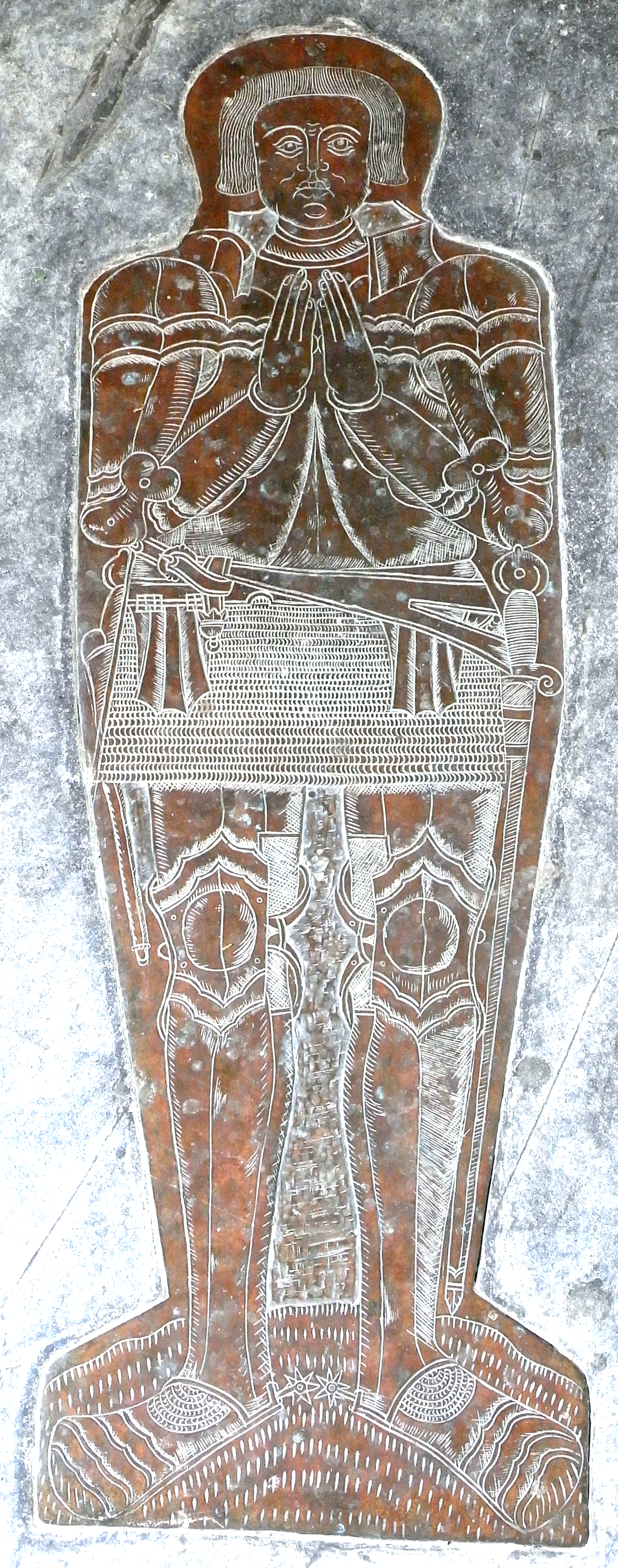
Monumental brass believed to represent Sir William Cary (1437–1471), lord of the manors of Clovelly and Cockington, Devon. Set into a slate ledger stone in floor of chancel, All Saints Church, Clovelly, without identifying inscription or armorials, next to brass of his son and heir Robert Cary (died 1540)

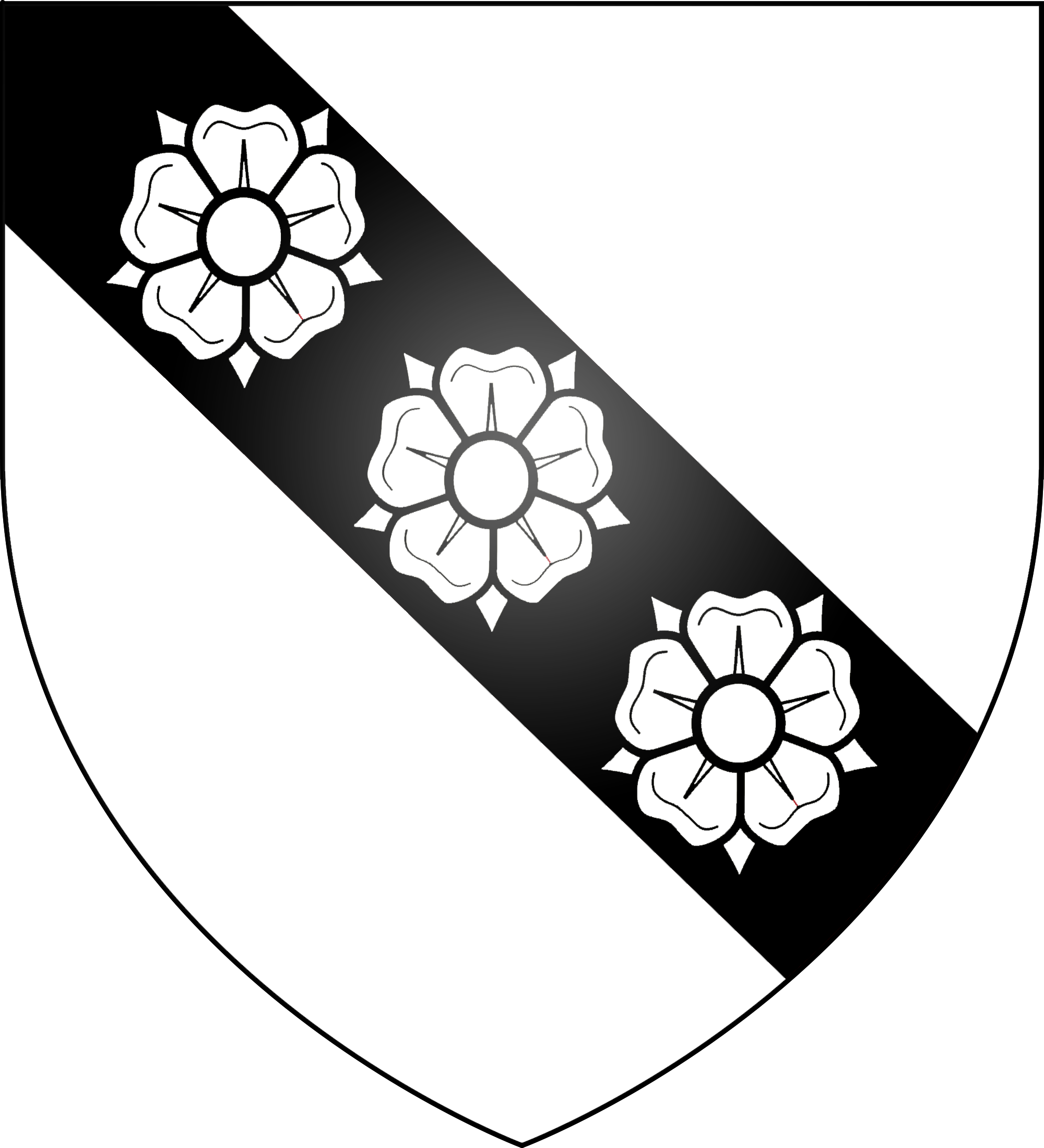
Arms of Cary: Argent, on a bend sable three roses of the field.

Sir William Cary (1437–1471) of Cockington and Clovelly in Devon was a member of the Devonshire gentry. He was beheaded after the defeat of the Lancastrians at the Battle of Tewkesbury in 1471.

== Origins ==
He was the son and heir of Philip Cary (died 1437) of Cockington, Member of Parliament for Devon in 1433, by his wife Christiana de Orchard (died 1472), daughter and heiress of William de Orchard of Orchard (later Orchard Portman), near Taunton in Somerset. Christiana de Orchard survived her first husband and remarried to Walter Portman, ten times MP for Taunton, by whom she had children, ancestors of the present Viscount Portman, owner of the Portman Estate in London.

== Marriages and children ==
Cary married twice:

- Firstly to Elizabeth Poulett, a daughter of Sir William Poulett of Hinton St George, Somerset (ancestor of Earl Poulett), by whom he had a son and heir:
  - Robert Cary (died 1540), of Cockington
- Secondly he married Anna (or Alice) Fulford, a daughter of Sir Baldwin Fulford (died 1476) of Fulford, Devon, by whom he had children:
  - Thomas Cary of Chilton Foliat, Wiltshire, who married Margaret Spencer (1472–1536), (or Eleanor Spencer), one of the two daughters and co-heiresses of Sir Robert Spencer (died c. 1510), "of Spencer Combe", in the parish of Crediton in Devon, by his wife Eleanor Beaufort (1431–1501), daughter of Edmund Beaufort, 2nd Duke of Somerset (1406–1455), KG. By Margaret Spencer, Thomas had three sons and several daughters:
    - Sir John Cary (1491–1552) of Plashey, eldest son, ancestor to the Cary Viscounts Falkland.
    - Anne [de] Carey (1493-1550) of Clovelly. No issue.
    - William Carey (1495-1528), her second son, the first husband of Mary Boleyn, sister of Queen Anne Boleyn, and ancestor to the Cary Barons Hunsdon, Barons Cary of Leppington, Earls of Monmouth, Viscounts Rochford and Earls of Dover.
    - Margaret [de] Carey (1496-1560) of Clovelly. She married Sir John Delaval, Sheriff (16 April 1493 – 14 December 1562), a descendant of Ralph Neville, 1st Earl of Westmorland; Margaret de Stafford; John de Mowbray, 4th Baron Mowbray; and Elizabeth de Segrave, 5th Baroness Segrave.
    - Edward Carey (1498-1560). No issue.
    - Eleanor [de] Carey (1499-1526) of Chilton Foliat, Wiltshire. She became a nun at Wilton Abbey.
    - Marie [de] Carey (1501-1560) of Bideford, Devon, who married Sir Henry Goldsmith (1500-1551) of Richmond, Greater London.

== Death ==
Cary was beheaded on 6 May 1471 after the defeat of the Lancastrians at the Battle of Tewkesbury. He is believed to be represented by a monumental brass of a knight, without surviving identifying inscription, set into a slate ledger stone on the floor of the chancel of All Saints Church, Clovelly, next to a smaller brass, in similar style, of his son and heir Robert Cary (died 1540).
