= John Carey (courtier) =

English courtier

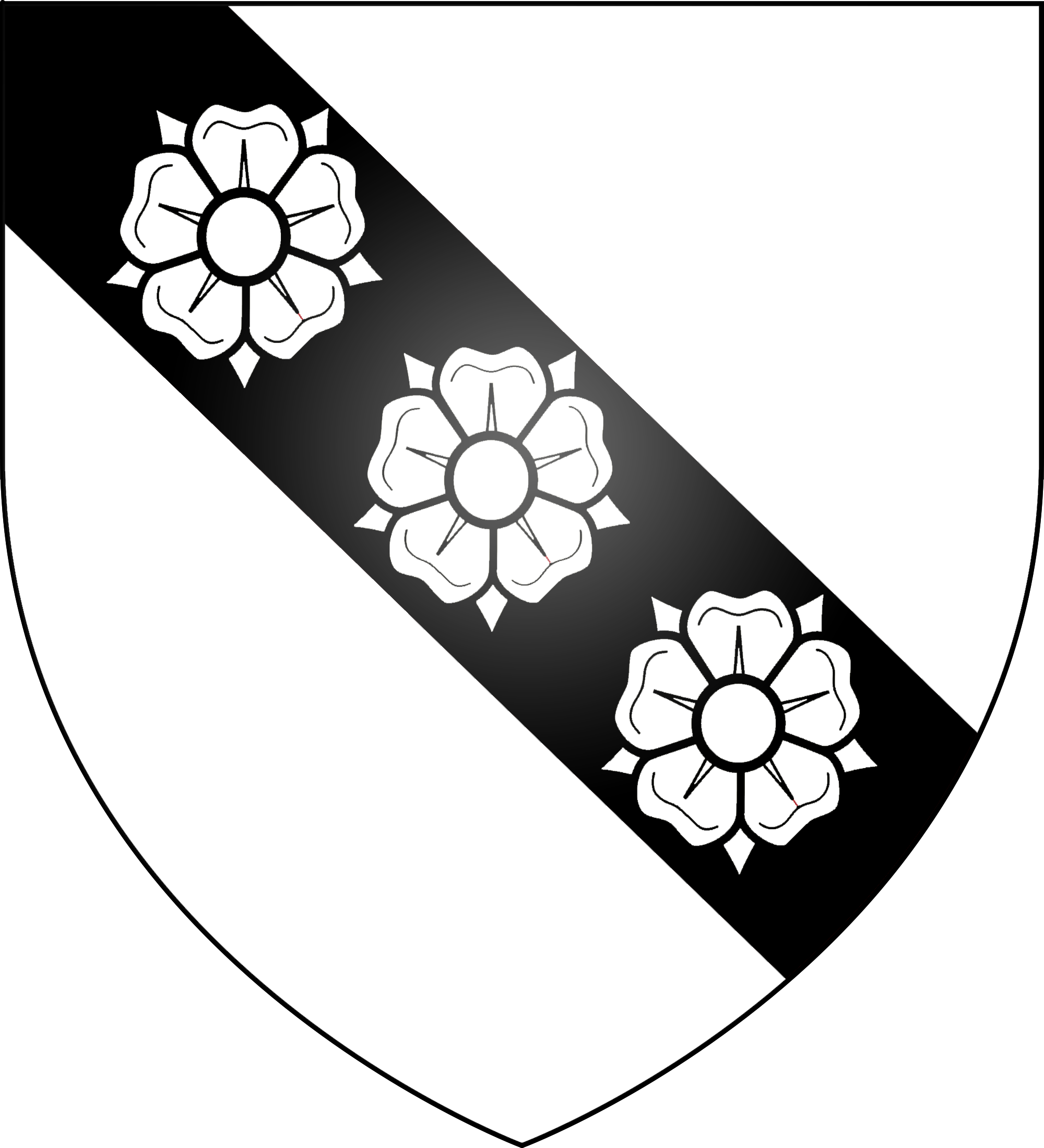
- Arms of Cary: Argent, on a bend sable three roses of the field
- Born: c. 1491
- Died: 1552 (aged 60–61)
- Spouse: Joyce Denny
- Children: 2, including Edward
- Mother: Eleanor Spencer
- Relatives: William Carey (brother); Eleanor Carey (sister); Robert Spencer (grandfather); Eleanor Beaufort (grandmother); William Cary (grandfather); Henry Cary (grandson)

Quartered arms of Sir John Cary, quarterly of 4: 1&4: Cary; 2&3: Spencer of Ashbury in Devon, as visible in the heraldic east window of St Lawrence's Church, Mereworth, Kent

Sir John Cary (or Carey) (c. 1491 – 1552), of Pleshey in Essex, was a courtier to King Henry VIII, whom he served as a Groom of the Privy Chamber, and of whom he was a third cousin, both being 4th in descent from John Beaufort, 1st Earl of Somerset (1371-1410).

== Origins ==
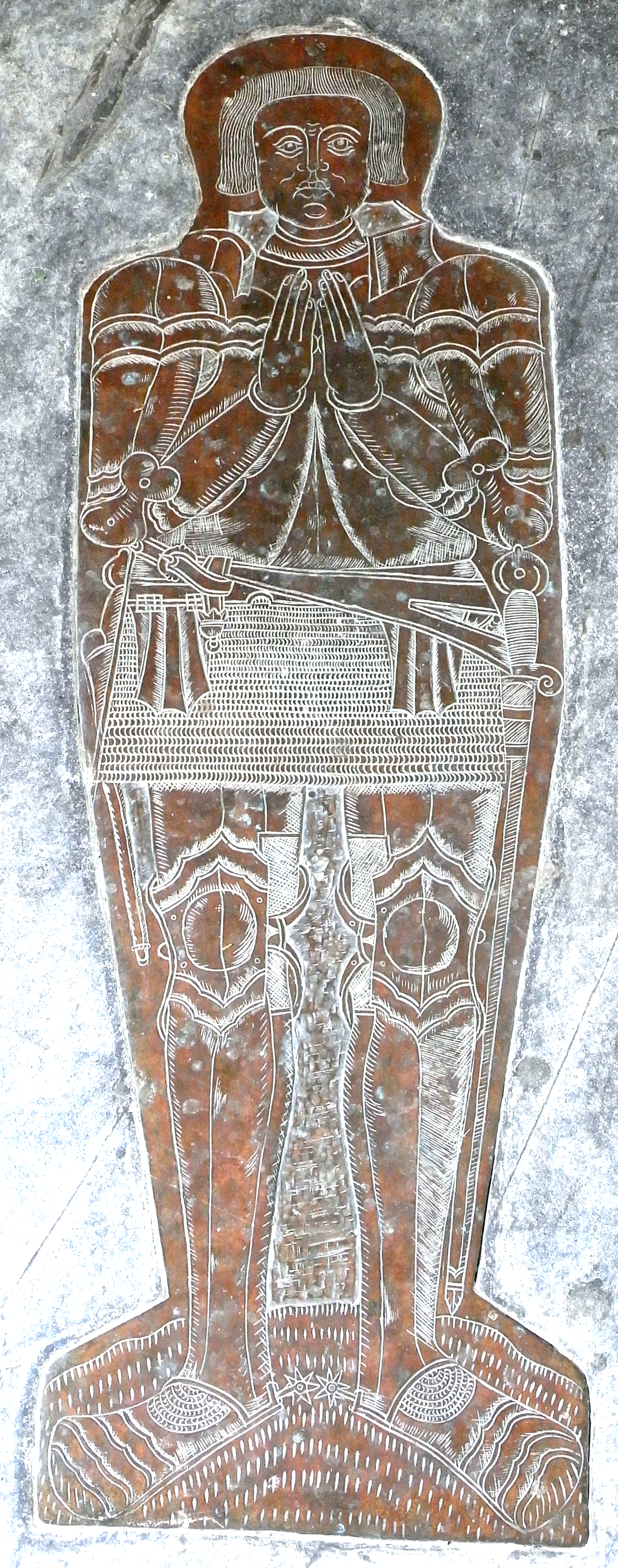
Monumental brass believed to represent Sir William Cary (1437–1471), lord of the manors of Clovelly and Cockington, Devon. Set into a slate ledger stone in floor of chancel, All Saints Church, Clovelly, without identifying inscription or armorials, next to brass of his son and heir Robert Cary (died 1540)

John was the eldest son of Sir Thomas Cary of Chilton Foliat in Wiltshire, the second son of Sir William Cary (1437–1471), lord of the manor of Clovelly in North Devon and of Cockington in South Devon. Sir William Cary was beheaded after the defeat of the Lancastrians at the Battle of Tewkesbury in 1471 and is believed to be represented by a monumental brass of a knight, without surviving identifying inscription, set into a slate ledger stone on the floor of the chancel of All Saints Church, Clovelly, next to a smaller brass, in similar style, of his eldest son and heir Robert Cary (died 1540).

John's mother was Eleanor Spencer (1472–1536)), one of the two daughters and co-heiresses of Sir Robert Spencer (d. circa 1510), of Ashbury in Devon and Brompton Ralph in Somerset (not of Spencer Combe as is often stated), by his wife, Eleanor Beaufort (1431–1501), a daughter and eventual co-heiress of Edmund Beaufort, 2nd Duke of Somerset (1406–1455), all three of her brothers having perished fighting for the Lancastrian cause. John's younger brother was the courtier William Cary the first husband of Mary Boleyn, sister of Queen Anne Boleyn, and ancestor to the Cary Barons Hunsdon, Barons Cary of Leppington, Earls of Monmouth, Viscounts Rochford and Earls of Dover. Eleanor Spencer's sister and co-heiress was Katherine Spencer (1477–1542), wife of Henry Percy, 5th Earl of Northumberland (1477–1527), and mother to Henry Percy, 6th Earl of Northumberland.

== Career ==
By July 1522 he was serving in the Royal Navy as captain of the King's ship, The Katherine Galley which was in the Channel between the Cinque Ports and Jersey during Henry VIII's first war with Francis I. By 1526 John, probably through the influence of his younger brother William Cary was at Henry VIII's court as a Groom of the Privy Chamber.

Several historians credit John Cary with convincing Anne Boleyn (his sister-in-law as John's brother William was married to Anne's sister Mary) to support his sister Eleanor as a candidate for abbess of Wilton Abbey where she was a nun in the spring of 1528. Eleanor did not get the appointment, however, due to questionable conduct on her part. Later that year John Cary fell ill with the sweating sickness. Although he recovered, his brother William who had also fallen ill was not so fortunate and died in June 1528.

On 21 July 1538 John Cary was granted the priory of Thremhall in Essex where he often lived. By September 1542 he had returned to sea as a vice-admiral commanding the transports of the East Coast in support of the Duke of Norfolk's expedition against Scotland. John Cary was knighted by Edward VI in 1547, probably through the influence of his brother-in-law, Sir Anthony Denny. Cary died on 9 September 1552 in Hunsdon, Hertfordshire, and was buried in Hunsdon church.

== Marriage & issue ==
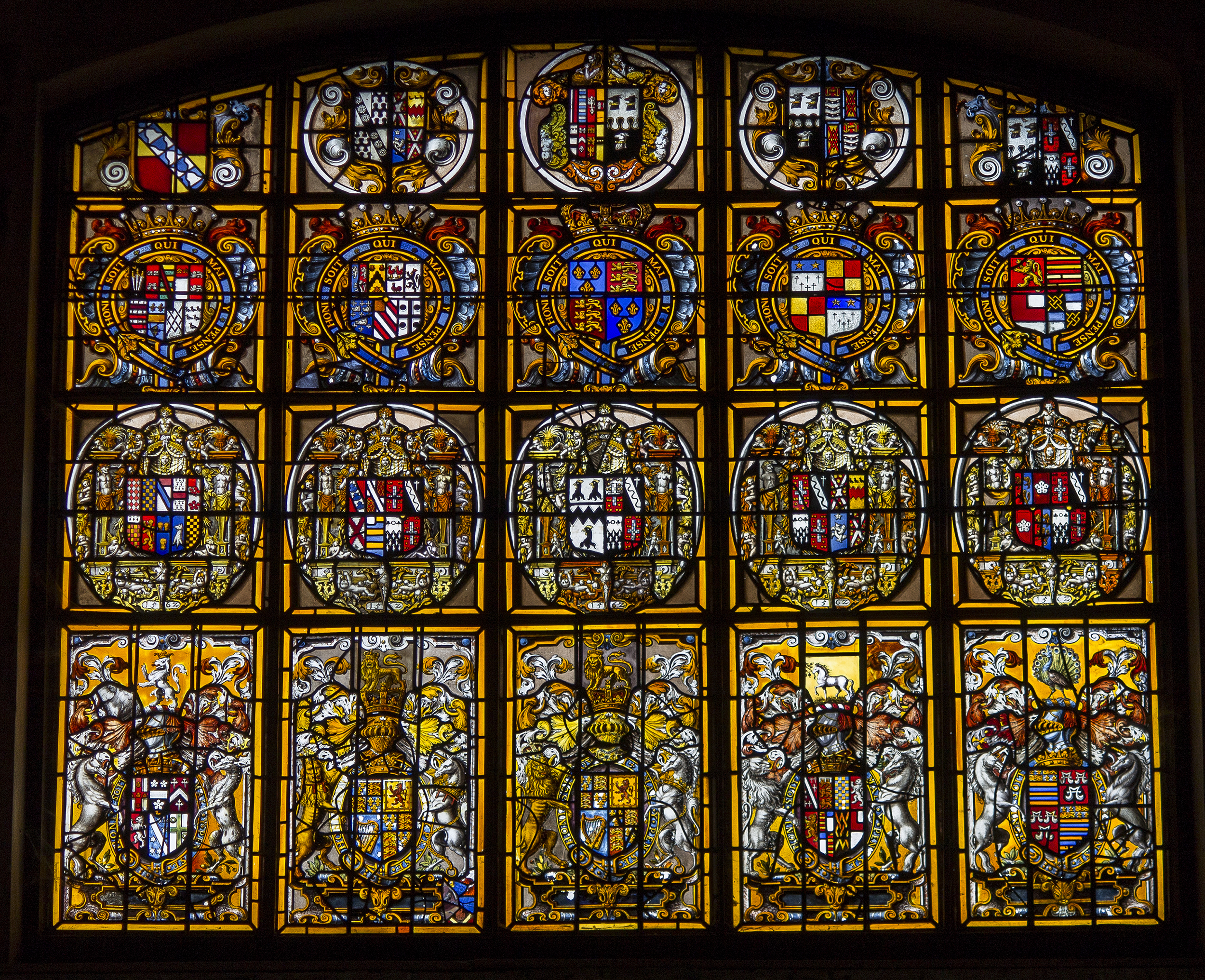
Arms of Sir John Cary impaling Denny (top row second from left), Mereworth Church in Kent

Probably in late 1538, John Cary married Joyce, widow of William Walsingham (by whom she had seven children including Sir Francis Walsingham) and a daughter of Sir Edmund Denny of Chestnut, by his wife Mary Troutbeck. His arms, impaling Denny, survive in the large heraldic stained glass window in Mereworth Church in Kent, which manor was connected to the Walsingham family. By his wife, he had two sons:

- Sir Edward Cary of Pleshy and Aldenham, a Member of Parliament and Master of the Jewel Office to Queen Elizabeth I and King James I, the father of:
  - Henry Cary, 1st Viscount Falkland (c.1575-1633) Lord Deputy of Ireland;
- Wymond Cary

Princess Diana of Wales is a direct descendant of John Carey.
