= Wymond Carew =

English courtier and politician (c. 1500–1549

The Honourable Wymond Carew KB
- Born: c. 1498
- Died: 22 August 1549 (aged 50–51)
- Occupations: Courtier; Politician
- Spouse: Martha Denny (m. 1519)
- Children: Thomas Carew; Sir Matthew Carew; 17 more
- Parents: John Carew; Thomasin Holland
- Relatives: Richard Carew (grandson); George Carew (grandson)
- Family: Carew

Sir Wymond Carew (c. 1498 – 22 August 1549) was a sixteenth-century courtier and politician. He was a Member of the Parliament of England (MP) for the seat of Peterborough in 1549.

== Family ==
Carew was born about 1498, the eldest son of John Carew of Antony, Cornwall and his wife Thomasin Holland of Exeter. Nothing is known of his education, but he may have served in the household of Thomas Denys, who represented him in the negotiations for his marriage. By July 1519 he married Martha, the daughter of Sir Edmund Denny of Cheshunt, Hertfordshire and the sister of Sir Anthony Denny. His family may have hoped the marriage would help Carew to a career in the Exchequer, but his father-in-law died within months of the wedding. They had 19 children, an unknown number of whom survived to adulthood.

== Career ==
He became a stannary commissioner for the Duchy of Cornwall in 1532 and the following year was appointed deputy to the receiver-general Thomas Arundell. In 1536 he became a JP in Devon and Cornwall. He served as receiver-general for the lands of three of Henry VIII's six wives: Jane Seymour, Anne of Cleves and Catherine Parr and as treasurer of the household for Catherine Parr. In April 1545 he was appointed treasurer of the Court of First Fruits and Tenths. In December 1546, Carew was one of three commissioners, along with Sir John Gates and Sir Richard Southwell, sent to seize and inventory Kenninghall Palace, residence of Thomas Howard, third duke of Norfolk.

He was created a Knight of the Order of the Bath at the coronation of Edward VI in February 1547. He was elected MP for Peterborough in the first parliament of the reign in preference to a local candidate, presumably through the influence of supporters of the Duke of Somerset.

During the 1540s he supplemented his West Country estate with purchases of property nearer London, including the manor of Pishiobury, Hertfordshire and Brooke House and the manor of Hackney, Middlesex. Carew died intestate at Hackney on 22 August 1549. He was replaced in the Commons by John Campanett. As he died in office, his wife and eldest son Thomas had some difficulty sorting out his estate and some of his accumulated lands were sold to pay his debt to the Crown. Of his numerous children only five are known to have survived childhood: Thomas, Roger, Matthew, Anthony and Elizabeth, who married George Dacres.

== Arms ==
Coat of arms of Wymond Carew
Crest Out of the round top of a mainmast set off with pallisadoes Or, a lion rampant issuing Sable. Escutcheon Or, three lions passant in pale Sable. Supporters Dexter, a lion Sable; Sinister, an antelope Gules. Motto J'espère bien (French for "I hope well")

Parliament of England
Preceded by Thomas Moyle; Not known	Member of Parliament for Peterborough; 1547; With: Richard Pallady 1547–1552	Succeeded by Not known Not known
