= Matthew Carew =

English lawyer

- Died: 1618
- Education: Trinity College, Cambridge
- Spouse: Alice Rivers
- Children: 2+, including Thomas
- Parents: Wymond Carew (father); Martha Denny (mother)
- Relatives: Sir Anthony Denny (uncle); Joyce Denny (aunt); Edmund Denny (grandfather)

Sir Matthew Carew (died 1618) was an English lawyer.

== Life ==
He was a younger son, the tenth of either 16 or 19 children, of Sir Wymond Carew of Antony, Cornwall, treasurer of the first-fruits and tenths, by Martha Denny, sister of Sir Anthony Denny. He was educated at Westminster School, under Alexander Nowell. He went to Trinity College, Cambridge, where he was a scholar in 1548. He graduated B.A. in 1551, became a fellow the same year, and remained in residence for ten years. He was ordained as subdeacon in 1558, and had at least a nominal connection with the archdeaconry of Norfolk, although he was deprived of any office under Queen Elizabeth I.

== Career ==
Deciding to adopt the law as profession, Carew studied at Leuven, and was there and at other universities on the continent for twelve years. He accompanied Henry FitzAlan, 19th Earl of Arundel into Italy as interpreter, and returned with him to England. Carew then entered on practice in the court of arches, and ultimately became master in chancery, a position which he held for many years, being knighted on 23 July 1603, before the coronation of James I.

== Personal life ==
His wife was Alice, eldest daughter of Sir John Rivers, Knight, Lord Mayor of London, and widow of one Ingpenny; by her, Carew had numerous children. The end of his life was troubled. There was a rumour in January 1613 that he would be cheated of eight or nine thousand pounds through the fraud of a person in whom he had placed confidence, and a little later his eldest son was engaged in a quarrel with one Captain Osborne, who was then killed. Thomas Carew was another son, and Carew managed to find him a place with Sir Dudley Carleton.

He was buried at St. Dunstan's-in-the-West on 2 August 1618, his career being described in a memorial tablet in the church, and his name being kept in remembrance by a bequest for the poor of the parish.
