= Thremhall Priory =

Monastery in Essex, England

Coordinates: 51.873471°N 0.208998°E

Thremhall Priory was a community of Augustinian Canons in Great Hallingbury, Essex, England. It was probably founded in around 1150 by Gilbert de Montfichet or else by his son Richard de Montfichet the Elder.

It was dissolved in 1536 and re-granted to Sir John Cary and his betrothed, the widow Joyce Walsingham (née Denny; mother of Sir Francis Walsingham), with all its possessions, which included the manors of Thremhall, Engeyneshall (now Gidea Hall) in Little Clacton and Beches in Furneux Pelham.

There are no remains of the priory buildings, the site of which is now occupied by an 18th-century house, but the outlines of the moat and fishpond are still visible.
