= Philip Cary (MP for Woodstock) =

English landowner and politician

Member of Parliament for Woodstock
- In office 1614-1625

Personal details
- Born: c. 1579
- Died: 1631 (aged 51–52)
- Parent: Edward Cary (father)
- Relatives: Henry Cary (brother)
- Education: Queen's College, Oxford

Sir Philip Cary (c. 1579 – 1631) was an English landowner and politician who sat in the House of Commons between 1614 and 1625.

Cary was the son of Edward Cary of Berkhamsted Place, Hertfordshire. He matriculated at Queen's College, Oxford on 22 February 1594, aged 14. Cary was a student of Gray's Inn in 1590. He was knighted on 23 May 1605, In 1614, he was elected Member of Parliament for Woodstock and re-elected in 1621, 1624 and 1625.

Cary held estates at Caddington, Bedfordshire and Hunslet, Yorkshire. He died at the age of about 52 and was buried at Aldenham on 13 June 1631.

Parliament of England
| Preceded by Sir Richard Lee; Thomas Spencer | Member of Parliament for Woodstock; 1614-1625; With: Sir James Whitelocke 1614–1622; William Lenthall 1624; Sir Gerard Fleetwood | Succeeded by Edward Tavernor; Sir Gerard Fleetwood |
