= Eleanor Carey =

Scandalous English nun patronised by Anne Boleyn

Dame Eleanor Carey (d. after 1528) was an early modern English noblewoman and nun, known for being endorsed as a candidate for abbess of Wilton Abbey by Anne Boleyn until her scandalous life was discovered.

== Life ==
=== Ancestry and early life ===
Eleanor Carey was one of the eight or so children of Sir Thomas Carey of Chilton Foliat and his wife, born Margaret Spencer. Through her mother, Eleanor was a great-granddaughter of Edmund Beaufort, 2nd Duke of Somerset, making her a third cousin of Henry VIII, King of England.

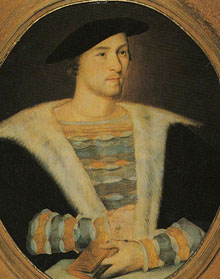
Sir William Carey, Eleanor's brother who looked after her career.

Nothing is known about her childhood. One of her brothers, the courtier William married a former mistress of Henry VIII, Mary Boleyn in 1521. Eleanor and at least one of her sisters became nuns at Saint Edith's Nunnery in the Abbey of Wilton (sometimes called Wilton Priory), a Benedictine convent near Salisbury in Wiltshire. There, they lived in the company of around fifty nuns, most of whom were said to lead dishonourable lives. Eleanor Carey herself gave birth to "two children by two sundry priests". For a time, she left the convent to live as the mistress of an unnamed servant of Robert Willoughby, 2nd Baron Willoughby de Broke.

=== Endorsement by Anne Boleyn ===
It seems Carey's brother Sir William obtained a promise from Thomas Wolsey, Cardinal Archbishop of York and main adviser to King Henry VIII, that Eleanor Carey would be made prioress of Wilton when the office became vacant. He probably also pursued the superior position of abbess on her behalf.

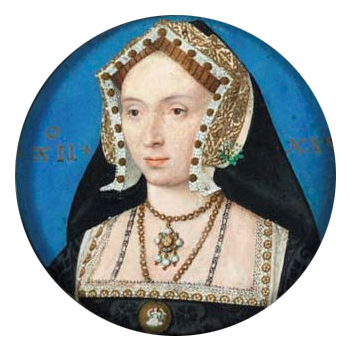
Anne Boleyn, Carey's patron after her brother's death.

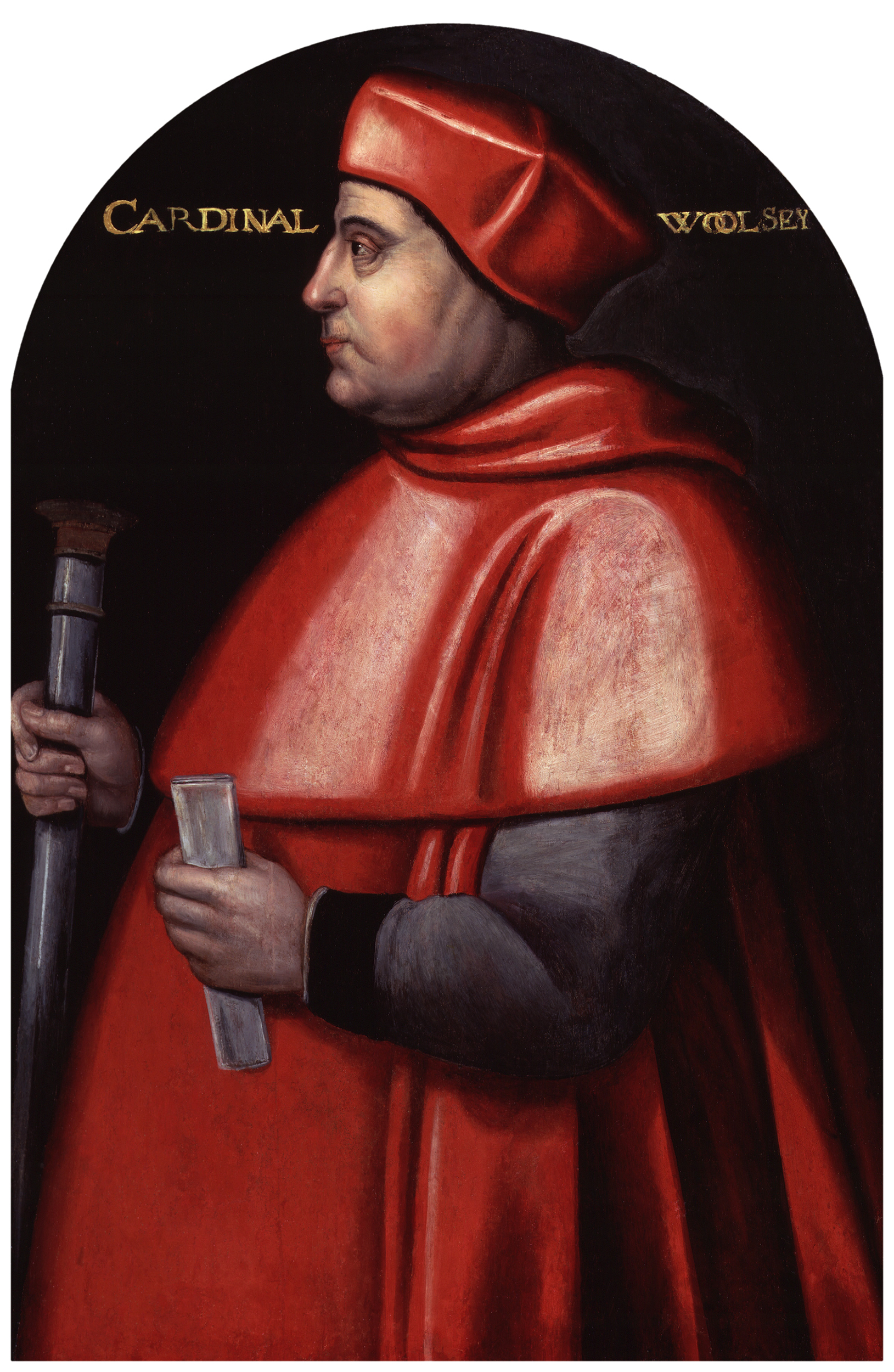
Cardinal Wolsey, who promoted Isabel Jordan.

On 24 April 1528, Cecily Willoughby, Abbess of Wilton died. Cardinal Wolsey put forward the prioress, Dame Isabel Jordan. She was said to be an "ancient, wise and discreet" woman and her sister Dame Agnes was the abbess of the much better-run Syon Abbey. It is possible that the nuns also favoured Jordan. Carey's brother William turned to his sister-in-law Anne Boleyn, the intended bride of the king, for help. Both her and the sovereign endorsed Carey, dismissing Dame Isabel as too old and being of a doubtful reputation. When Sir William died of sweating sickness on 22 June 1528, Anne Boleyn continued to upheld the claim of her Carey kinswomen, wanting either of them to become the ruler of the nunnery. This made Eleanor Carey and her sister the momentary focus of Anne Boleyn's conflict with Wolsey.

The cardinal personally investigated the nunnery, and Eleanor Carey admitted to her past lovers and illegitimate children. When the king was informed of this, he immediately asked Wolsey to search for a third candidate, withdrawing support from both Carey and Jordan. Despite this, Wolsey confirmed Isabel Jordan as abbess at a time when Anne Boleyn was not present at the royal court. The king publicly rebuked him for this, but Jordan remained abbess for some time. Nothing further is known of the fate of the Carey sisters.
