= Joyce Denny =

English courtier

- Born: 1507
- Died: 1560 (aged 52–53)
- Spouse(s): William Walsingham (d. 1534); John Carey (d. 1551)
- Children: Francis Walsingham; Barbara Walsingham; Christina Walsingham; Elizabeth Walsingham; Wymond Cary; Edward Cary
- Father: Edmund Denny
- Relatives: Martha Denny (sister); Anthony Denny (brother); Frances Burke (granddaughter)

Joyce Denny (1507–1560) was an English courtier.

== Family and court connections ==
She was a daughter of Edmund Denny, a Baron of the Exchequer, and Mary Troutbeck. Princess Elizabeth was lodged with her brother the courtier Anthony Denny at Cheshunt, a former property of Thomas Wolsey. A later country house on the site has been demolished. Her sister Martha Denny married Wymond Carew of Anthony, Cornwall, who was treasurer of the household for Catherine Parr, and her elder sister Mary Denny married John Gates, a gentleman of the privy chamber of Edward VI.

== Marriages and children ==
She married William Walsingham (died 1534) of Scadbury, Chislehurst or Foots Cray Place, a son of Edmund Walsingham. Their London home was in the parish of St Mary Aldermanbury. Their children included:

- Francis Walsingham (died 1590), principal secretary to Queen Elizabeth I.
- Barbara Walsingham, who married Thomas Sidney.
- Christina or Christian Walsingham, married (1) John Tamworth (died 1569), who was ambassador to Scotland concerning the Chaseabout Raid, gave money to Agnes Keith, Countess of Moray, and was detained at Hume Castle, and (2) William Doddington of Breamore.
- Elizabeth Walsingham, who married Peter Wentworth (1529–1596).
- Mary Walsingham, who married Walter Mildmay on 25 May 1546.

It has been argued that she was a strong Protestant influence on the upbringing of Francis Walsingham, who was probably brought up in her second husband's household at Hunsdon.

On the death of William Walsingham, Joyce, her brother-in-law Edmund Walsingham, and John Walsingham were his executors. Joyce Walsingham's silver plate passed into the custody of another executor, Henry White, an undersheriff of London.

Joyce married, secondly, John Cary or Carey of Pleshey (died 1551), a Groom of the Privy Chamber to Henry VIII. Henry VIII granted them the lands of Thremhall Priory in Essex in 1536, soon after their marriage. Their children included:

- Wymond Cary (1538-1612), knighted 1604.
- Edward Cary (died 1618).

== Death ==
She died in 1560. According to her will, she wished to be buried in the parish church of Aldermanbury, London, next to William Walsingham. She bequeathed silver plate and a velvet bed tester embroidered with gold knots to Francis Walsingham. An entry in the diary of Henry Machyn describes her burial on 6 May 1559/60 at St Clement Danes, London.
