= Robert Spencer of Spencer Combe =

Sir Robert Spencer
- Arms of Sir Robert Spencer (d. circa 1510) of Spencer Combe: Sable, two bars nebuly ermine
- Died: Before 1510
- Spouse: Eleanor Beaufort
- Children: 2 daughters

Sir Robert Spencer (died before 1510) "of Spencer Combe" in the parish of Crediton, Devon, was the husband of Eleanor Beaufort (1431–1501), the daughter of Edmund Beaufort, 2nd Duke of Somerset (1406–1455), KG, and was father to two daughters and co-heiresses who made notable marriages.

== Origins ==
The origins of Spencer are unclear. The Devon historian Tristram Risdon (died 1640), quoting his source "Vincent upon Brooke and Mills", suggested he was lord of the manor of Spencer Combe in the parish of Crediton, Devon, which his ancestor Richard Spencer had inherited by marriage to Alice Hody, daughter of William Hody of Combe Lancells, whose own family had inherited it from the Lancells family. However Risdon's contemporary Sir William Pole (died 1635) makes no mention of Sir Robert at Spencer Combe, and states that the estate descended via the heiress Jone Spencer to the Giffard family. His origin at Spencer Combe is however traditional, and is given thus in most published pedigrees and rolls of arms.

The American genealogist Douglas Richardson suggests that Sir Robert Spencer was in fact the son and heir of John Spencer, Esquire, MP for Dorset, of Frampton in Dorset, Ashbury in Devon and Brompton Ralph in Somerset, by his wife Jone.

== Career ==
Little if anything is known about the career of Sir Robert Spencer, other than Risdon's statement that he was "Captain of the castle of Homet and Thomeline in Normandy". Due to his wife's inheritance of the manor and advowson of Hazelbury Bryan in Dorset, Spencer made presentations to the rectory in 1493 and 1496.

== Landholdings ==
He held the following manors, in right of his wife's dower:

- Chilton Foliat, Wiltshire, from where he dated his will.
- Hazelbury Bryan, Dorset
- Puncknowle, Dorset
- Toller Porcorum, Dorset
- Batheaston, Somerset
- Kingsdon, Somerset
- Shockerwick, Somerset
- Somerton Erleigh (in Somerton), Somerset
- Somerton Randolph (in Somerton), Somerset.

== Marriage and issue ==
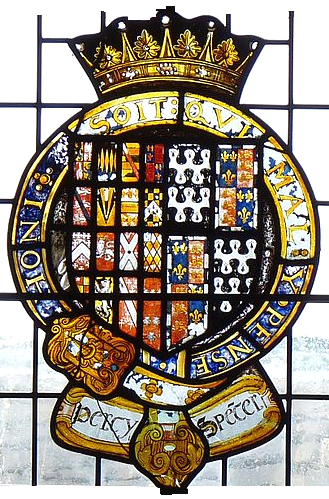
17th century stained-glass escutcheon in the Percy Window, Petworth House, Sussex, showing arms of Henry Percy, 5th Earl of Northumberland (1477–1527), KG, (with 16 quarterings) impaling quarterly of 4: 1&4: Sable, two bars nebuly ermine (Spencer of Spencer Combe), 2&3: The Royal Arms of England within a bordure compony argent and azure (Beaufort). The two halves of the escutcheon are inscribed below: Percy (dexter) and Spe(n)cer (sinister)

In about 1465, he married (as her 2nd husband) Eleanor Beaufort (1431–1501), the widow of James Butler, 5th Earl of Ormond, 1st Earl of Wiltshire (d. 1461) and the daughter and eventual heiress of Edmund Beaufort, 2nd Duke of Somerset (1406–1455), KG, the third surviving son of John Beaufort, 1st Earl of Somerset, the eldest of the four legitimised children of John of Gaunt (1340-1399) (third surviving son of King Edward III) by his mistress Katherine Swynford). Her brothers were the 3rd and 4th Dukes of Somerset. By his wife he had two daughters and co-heiresses as follows:

- Margaret Spencer (1472–1536), (or Eleanor Spencer) wife of Thomas Cary of Chilton Foliat, Wiltshire, second son of Sir William Cary (1437–1471) of Cockington, Devon. She had two sons:
  - Sir John Cary (1491–1552) of Plashey, eldest son, ancestor to the Cary Viscounts Falkland.
  - William Cary, her 2nd son, the first husband of Mary Boleyn, sister of Queen Anne Boleyn, and ancestor to the Cary Barons Hunsdon, Barons Cary of Leppington, Earls of Monmouth, Viscounts Rochford and Earls of Dover.
- Katherine Spencer (1477–1542), wife of Henry Percy, 5th Earl of Northumberland (1477–1527), KG, and mother to Henry Percy, 6th Earl of Northumberland.

== Death ==
Sir Robert Spencer died shortly before 1510, his will having been proved on 12 April 1510.

== Heraldry ==
The arms of "Spencer of Spencer Combe" as quartered by the Percy Earls of Northumberland, visible in the Percy Window in the chapel at Petworth House and by the Cary Viscounts Falkland are: Sable, two bars nebuly ermine. Sir William Pole, however, gives the arms of Spencer of Spencer Combe as: Argent, on a bend sable two pairs of keys or.
