= Walter Mildmay =

English politician (d. 1589)

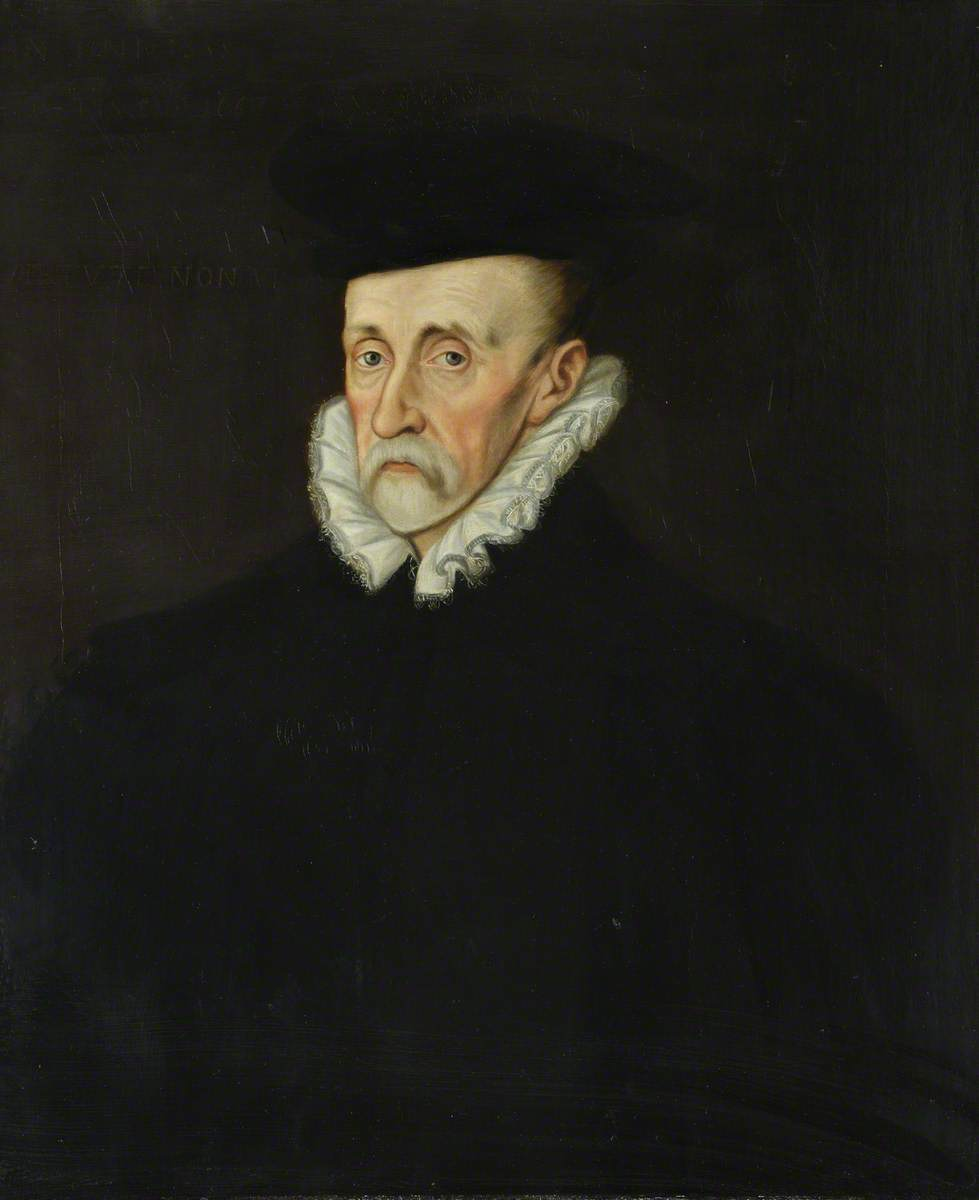
Portrait by Paul van Somer I (c. 1577–1621)

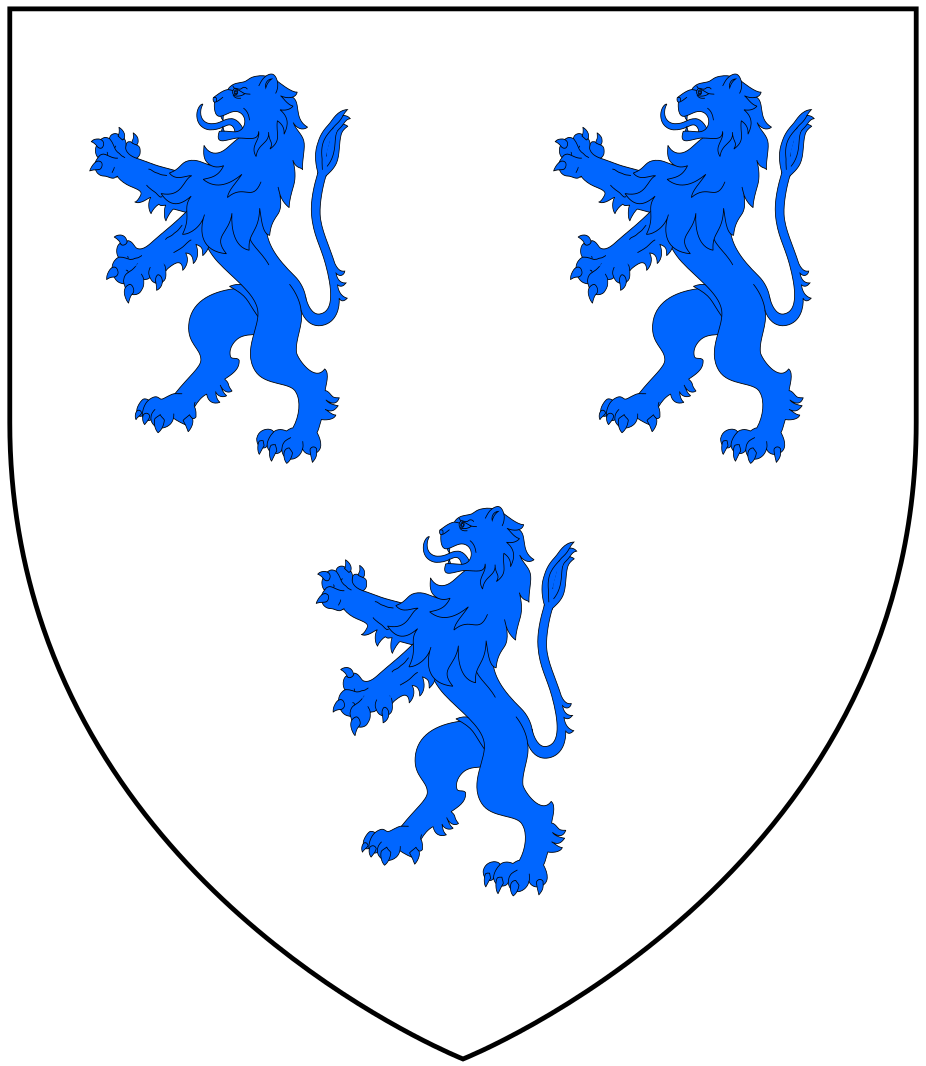
Arms of Mildmay: Argent, three lions rampant azure.

Sir Walter Mildmay (bef. 1523 – 31 May 1589) was an English politician who served as Chancellor of the Exchequer to Queen Elizabeth I, and founded Emmanuel College, Cambridge.

== Origins ==
He was born at Moulsham in Essex, the fourth and youngest son of Thomas Mildmay, later auditor of the Court of Augmentations under Henry VIII, by his wife Agnes Read. As the Commissioner for receiving the surrender of the monasteries at the Dissolution, his father Thomas made a large fortune and in 1540 acquired the manor of Moulsham, near Chelmsford in Essex, where he built a fine mansion.

=== Collateral line ===
Walter's elder brother Sir Thomas Mildmay (d. 1566) of Moulsham, was auditor of the Court of Augmentations, established in 1537 for allocating the property taken by the Crown from the monasteries. He was buried in Chelmsford Church, where his monument survived in 1878. Sir Thomas Mildmay was the grandfather of Sir Thomas Mildmay, 1st Baronet (d. 1626), created a baronet in 1611, and of Sir Henry Mildmay (d. 1654), a knight. Henry claimed, in right of his mother Frances Radcliffe, a daughter of Henry Radclyffe, 2nd Earl of Sussex, 3rd Baron FitzWalter (1507–1557), the barony of FitzWalter, and on 10 February 1670 his grandson Benjamin Mildmay, 17th Baron FitzWalter (c. 1646–1679), was summoned to the House of Lords by that title. Benjamin's two sons were Charles Mildmay, 18th Baron FitzWalter (1670–1728) and Benjamin Mildmay, 1st Earl FitzWalter, 1st Viscount Harwich, 19th Baron FitzWalter (1672–1756), the latter being further created Viscount Harwich and Earl FitzWalter in 1730. On Earl FitzWalter's death in 1756, the earldom became extinct and the barony fell into abeyance.

== Career ==
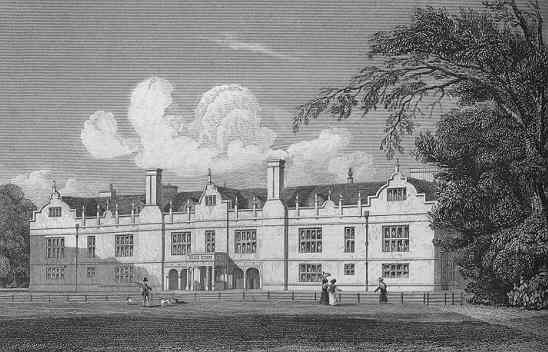
Apethorpe Hall, depicted in 1829, acquired by Mildmay in 1552

Mildmay was educated at Christ's College, Cambridge, but as was common at the time, especially for those not intending to enter the church, did not take a degree. He later became a student of law at Gray's Inn (1546), and there obtained some employment under his father in the Court of Augmentations. When the Court of Augmentation was reconstituted, about 1545, Mildmay was made one of its two surveyors-general. During Edward VI's reign, Mildmay extended his official connection.

On 22 February 1546/47 he was knighted, and on 14 September prepared, along with three others, an inventory of the late King's wardrobe. Sixteen days later he was appointed a commissioner to report upon the Crown revenues. In 1548 he acted on commissions for the sale of lands (March) and for the maintenance of such grammar schools as had belonged to the dissolved chantries. After the Duke of Somerset's arrest he was ordered by the Privy Council on 12 November 1549, to examine the Palace of Westminster, which had been in the Duke's custody, and, on 8 March 1550/51, to take charge of the Duke's property at Syon House.

For his services, he received many grants of land in Gloucestershire and Berkshire, some of which he exchanged for manors in Oxfordshire and Northamptonshire; other grants of land in Cornwall, Essex and London soon followed. He fixed his country residence at Apethorpe Hall, Northamptonshire, which was granted to him in 1552, and was confirmed to him in 1556. When in London he lived in the parish of St Bartholomew-the-Great.

Mildmay soon proved himself a skillful financier. In 1550 he was directed, together with the Earl of Warwick and Sir William Herbert, to examine the accounts of the King's mints, and in 1551 superintended the establishment of a new mint at York. In December 1551 he was a commissioner to inspect the Courts which controlled the Crown lands.

- On 2 January 1552 he was commissioned to levy the King's debts;
- On 21 November to settle with the Crown accountants the effect of a fall in the value of money;
- In December to audit the funds belonging to the king's officers; and
- In that and the next year he superintended the receipt by the crown of plate, jewels, bells, and the like surrendered by dissolved monasteries or chantries.

Mildmay was elected MP for Lostwithiel in 1545, for Lewes in 1547 and Maldon on 1 March 1553, and then for Peterborough on 5 October 1553. Although a committed Calvinist, Queen Mary's accession did not appreciably depress his fortunes, and before her death he was employed on Government business. On 9 January 1558, he was appointed treasurer of the forces sent to the relief of Calais and was chosen as knight of the shire to represent Northamptonshire in the parliament meeting in January 1557; after this he represented that constituency eight times until his death.

Under Queen Elizabeth, with whom he regularly exchanged New-Year's gifts, his influence steadily grew. On her accession he was at once made treasurer of her household, and was appointed a member of a small committee of ways and means to supply the empty exchequer. He was soon employed in preparing a census of the farms of the royal revenues (22 December 1558), in examining Queen Mary's grants of land, in compounding with those who refused knighthood (28 March 1559), in directing the issue of a new coinage (29 October 1560), and in selling crown lands (May 1563).

On 21 April 1566, Sir Richard Sackville, the chancellor of the exchequer, died, and Mildmay was appointed as his replacement; he was also made auditor of the Duchy of Lancaster. Occupied in the duties of his offices until his death, he concerned himself little with general politics. As the brother-in-law of Francis Walsingham and the friend of Lord Burghley, he was, however, always heard with attention in the Privy Council, the Star Chamber, and in Parliament. He used what influence he possessed to shield the Puritans from the attacks of the bishops, and often urged the Queen to intervene on behalf of the Protestants in the Low Countries. In his speeches in Parliament he argued that a liberal grant of subsidies placed the government under an obligation to redress grievances, and thus identified himself with the popular party in the commons.

In 1572 he helped to prepare evidence against Thomas Howard, 4th Duke of Norfolk, who, nevertheless, after his condemnation gave him some rich jewels. His nephew Sir Christopher Peyton was appointed Auditor General of Ireland in 1584.

The affairs of Mary, Queen of Scots, also occasionally occupied his attention. When she arrived in England in 1567 he strongly advised her detention. In October 1577 he and Cecil visited her at Chatsworth, after she had announced that she had important secrets to reveal to Elizabeth.

In 1586, he went to Fotheringhay Castle and informed her of her forthcoming trial, in which he took part as one of the special commissioners. In March 1587 he urged the condemnation of William Davison in the Star Chamber. Although four times nominated an ambassador to Scotland, in 1565, 1580, 1582, and 1583, he was on each occasion detained at home, but when his name was suggested for the office in 1589, James VI expressed great readiness to receive him. Mildmay's illness, however, brought the suggestion to nothing.

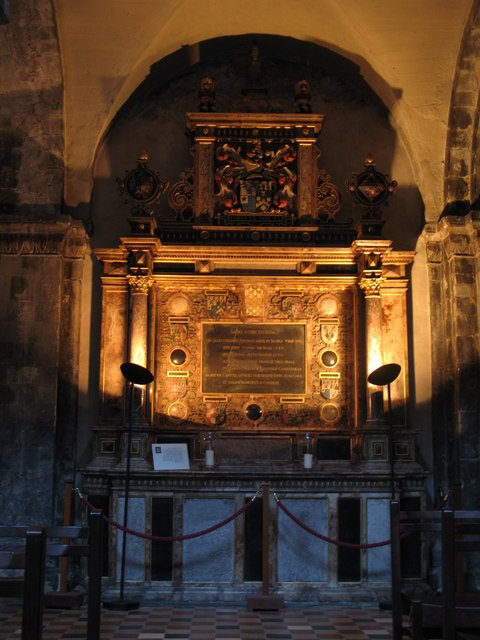
The tomb of Sir Walter and Lady Mary Mildmay in St Bartholomew-the-Great

Mildmay died at Hackney on 31 May 1589, and is buried beside his wife in the church of St Bartholomew-the-Great in London, where an elaborate monument exists to his memory. The decorations are heraldic, but the Latin epitaph merely records names and dates. The tomb was restored in 1865 by Henry Bingham Mildmay.

Epitaphs on Mildmay and Sir John Calthrop were licensed by the Stationers' Company on 29 July 1589. They are not known to be extant.

== Founder of Emmanuel College, Cambridge ==
Arms of Emmanuel College, Cambridge, using one of the lions rampant azure from the Mildmay arms

Mildmay displayed his interest in education with much effect. On 23 November 1583 he purchased for £550 the site of Cambridge Blackfriars, a dissolved house of the Dominican Order, which was situated in what was then called Preachers Street, but is now known as St Andrew's Street. On 11 January 1584, he obtained the Queen's licence to set up Emmanuel College there.

The architect was Ralph Symons, and in 1588 the new building was opened with a dedication festival, which Mildmay attended. He installed in the college a master, Laurence Chaderton, three fellows, and four scholars; but subsequent benefactions soon increased the fellowships to fourteen and the scholarships to fifty. According to Thomas Fuller, Mildmay, on coming to court, after the college was opened was addressed by the Queen with the words: "Sir Walter, I hear you have erected a puritan foundation", to which Mildmay replied: "No, madam; far be it from me to countenance anything contrary to your established laws; but I have set an acorn, which when it becomes an oak, God alone knows what will be the fruit thereof".

His statutes for the government of Emmanuel College are dated 1 October 1585 and are attested by his sons, Anthony and Humphrey, John Hammond, LL.D., William Lewyn, LL.D., Thomas Byng, LL.D., Timothy Bright, M.D., and Edward Downing. Mildmay deprecated perpetual fellowships, and warned the fellows against regarding the college as "a perpetual abode" — they were to look forward to spreading outside the knowledge they acquired within its walls.

Mildmay otherwise showed his interest in education by acting as an original governor of Chelmsford Chantry School, now King Edward VI Grammar School, founded in 1550–1; by giving an annuity of 52s. to Christ's Hospital (10 April 1556); and by bestowing £20 a year on Christ's College, Cambridge (10 March 1568 – 1569), to be expended on a Greek lectureship, six scholarships and a preachership to be filled by a fellow of the college. He also contributed stone for completing the tower of Great St Mary's Church, Cambridge, and he helped to found the free-school at Middleton, Lancashire.

There are three portraits of Mildmay at Emmanuel College; one with his wife. A fourth painting was at Moulsham Hall, demolished in 1809, near Chelmsford, and a fifth at Knole, Sevenoaks. There are also engravings by J. Faber and E. Harding, and an unsigned plate is known.

== Character and publications ==
Sidney Lee wrote that Mildmay was a man of cultivation and of great piety, with some popular reputation as a believer in second sight. Henry Caesar, dean of Ely, was directed by the Star Chamber to retract a report that he had circulated to the effect that Mildmay had endeavoured to see by conjuration the person of Cardinal Pole after his death.

Henry Roberts, in his Fames Trumpet Soundinge (1589), mentions a book by Mildmay, and describes it as "in print now extant". It was entitled A Note to know a Good Man. Sir John Harington, in his Orlando Furioso, bk. xxii, p. 175, gives a stanza in Latin with an English translation; the former he says he derived from Mildmay's Latin poems, which are not otherwise known. A "memorial" by Mildmay, written for his son Anthony in 1570, consisting of sensible moral precepts, was printed from a manuscript at Apethorpe by the Rev. Arundell St John-Mildmay in 1893. Many of his official letters and papers are at Hatfield or in the state paper office.

== Marriage and issue ==
Mildmay married Mary Walsingham (died 16 March 1576), a daughter of William Walsingham by his wife Joyce (or Joice), a daughter of Edmund Denny, a Baron of the Exchequer, and a sister of Sir Francis Walsingham. By his wife he had issue including:

- Sir Anthony Mildmay (d.1617), of Apethorpe, eldest son and heir, an ambassador to France, who married Grace Sharington by whom he had one daughter Mary Mildmay.
- Humphrey Mildmay of Danbury Place, Essex, father of Sir Henry Mildmay;
- Winifred Mildmay, wife of Sir William Fitzwilliam of Gains Park, Essex;
- Martha Mildmay, wife of Sir William Brouncker;
- Christiana Mildmay, wife successively of Charles Barrett of Aveley in Essex, and Sir John Leveson of Kent, Knight.

== Notes ==
Political offices
Preceded by Sir Richard Sackville	Chancellor of the Exchequer; 1566–1589	Succeeded by John Fortescue
