= Eleanor Beaufort =

English noblewoman (1431–1501)

- Countess of Ormond; Countess of Wiltshire
- Born: 1431
- Died: 16 August 1501 (aged 69–70)
- Noble family: Beaufort (by birth); Butler (by marriage); Spencer (by marriage)
- Spouses: James Butler, 5th Earl of Ormond; Robert Spencer
- Issue: Margaret Spencer; Catherine Spencer
- Father: Edmund Beaufort, 2nd Duke of Somerset
- Mother: Eleanor Beauchamp

Arms of Beaufort, Earls and Dukes of Somerset: The Royal Arms of England within a bordure compony argent and azure

Lady Eleanor Beaufort, Countess of Ormond and Wiltshire (1431 – 16 August 1501) was the daughter of Edmund Beaufort, 2nd Duke of Somerset (1406–1455), KG, and was a sister of the 3rd and 4th Dukes of Somerset.

== Origins ==
She was the daughter of Edmund Beaufort, 2nd Duke of Somerset, KG (1406–1455), by his wife, Lady Eleanor Beauchamp. Eleanor Beauchamp was the daughter of Richard Beauchamp, 13th Earl of Warwick, by his first wife, Elizabeth de Berkeley (herself daughter and heiress of Thomas de Berkeley, 5th Baron Berkeley, by his wife, Margaret de Lisle, 3rd Baroness Lisle); she was also an elder half-sister of Henry de Beauchamp, 1st Duke of Warwick, and Anne Neville, 16th Countess of Warwick.

== Marriages and children ==
Eleanor Beaufort married twice. Her first marriage was in circa April 1458 to James Butler, 5th Earl of Ormond, 1st Earl of Wiltshire (d. 1461). Butler was Lieutenant of Ireland in 1453; when civil conflict broke out, the lieutenant fought on the Lancastrian side. He was present at the First Battle of St. Albans in 1455, Mortimer's Cross in 1461, and at the Battle of Towton. Butler also held the post of councilor to the Lancastrian Prince of Wales. After Towton, he was a proscribed as a traitor and was captured in the same year at Cockermouth and executed there in 1461.

Her second marriage was to Sir Robert Spencer of Spencer Combe in the parish of Crediton, Devon, by whom she had two daughters and co-heiresses:

- Margaret Spencer (or Eleanor Spencer; 1472–1536); wife of Thomas Carey of Chilton Foliot, Wiltshire, second son of Sir William Carey (1437–1471) of Cockington, Devon. She had two sons:
  - Sir John Carey (1491–1552) of Plashey, eldest son, ancestor to the Carey Viscounts Falkland.
  - William Carey, her second son, the first husband of Anne Boleyn's sister Mary Boleyn and ancestor to the Carey Barons Hunsdon, Barons Carey of Leppington, Earls of Monmouth, Viscounts Rochford and Earls of Dover.
- Catherine Spencer (1477–1542); wife of Henry Percy, 5th Earl of Northumberland, and mother to Henry Percy, 6th Earl of Northumberland, an early love interest of Anne Boleyn.

== Ancestry ==
Ancestors of Eleanor Beaufort

16. Edward III of England
8. John of Gaunt, 1st Duke of Lancaster
17. Philippa of Hainault
4. John Beaufort, 1st Earl of Somerset
18. Sir Payne de Roet
9. Katherine Swynford
2. Edmund Beaufort, 2nd Duke of Somerset
20. Thomas Holland, 1st Earl of Kent
10. Thomas Holland, 2nd Earl of Kent
21. Joan, 4th Countess of Kent
5. Margaret Holland
22. Richard FitzAlan, 10th Earl of Arundel
11. Alice FitzAlan
23. Eleanor of Lancaster
1. Eleanor Beaufort
24. Thomas de Beauchamp, 11th Earl of Warwick
12. Thomas de Beauchamp, 12th Earl of Warwick
25. Katherine Mortimer
6. Richard Beauchamp, 13th Earl of Warwick
26. William Ferrers, 3rd Baron Ferrers of Groby
13. Margaret Ferrers
27. Margaret de Ufford
3. Eleanor Beauchamp
28. Maurice de Berkeley, 4th Baron Berkeley
14. Thomas de Berkeley, 5th Baron Berkeley
29. Elizabeth le Despenser
7. Elizabeth de Berkeley
30. Warine de Lisle, 2nd Baron Lisle
15. Margaret de Lisle, 3rd Baroness Lisle
31. Margaret Pipard

== Sources ==
- The royal descent of Nelson and Wellington, from Edward the first, George Russell French, 1853, p. 28
- The Rise and Fall of Anne Boleyn: Family Politics at the Court of Henry VIII, Retha Marvine Warnicke, 1984, p. 36
- The Baronetage of England: containing a genealogical and historical account of all the English, Edward Kimber, 1771, p. 221
