= Francis Walsingham =

English spy and statesman (1532–1590)

Sir Francis Walsingham
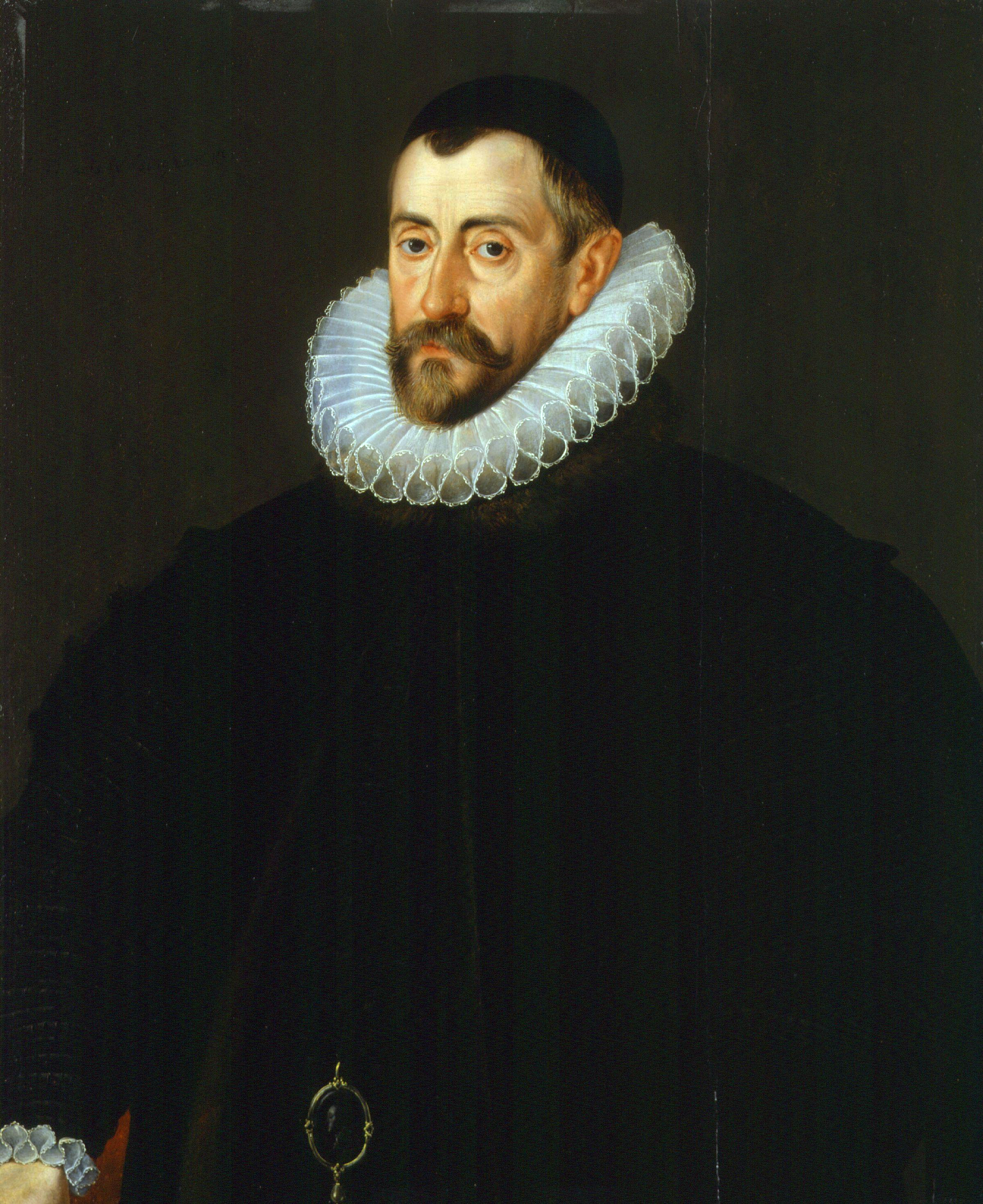
- c. 1585 portrait

Secretary of State
- In office 1573–1590
- Monarch: Elizabeth I

Personal details
- Born: c. 1532 (Note: Occasionally, the year of his birth is erroneously given as 1536, but he is named in his father's will of 1 March 1534.) Probably Chislehurst, Kent, England
- Died: 6 April 1590 (aged c. 58) London, England
- Spouses: Anne Barne (m. 1562; died 1564); Ursula St Barbe (m. 1566)
- Children: 2, including Frances
- Parents: William Walsingham (father); Joyce Denny (mother)
- Education: King's College, Cambridge
- Occupation: Statesman and spymaster

Sir Francis Walsingham (c. 1532 – 6 April 1590) was principal secretary to Queen Elizabeth I of England from 20 December 1573 until his death and is popularly remembered as her "spymaster".

Born to a well-connected family from the landed gentry, Walsingham attended Cambridge University and travelled in continental Europe before embarking on a career in law at the age of 20. A committed Protestant, during the reign of the Catholic Queen Mary I of England he joined other expatriates in exile in Switzerland and northern Italy until Mary's death and the accession of her Protestant half-sister, Elizabeth.

Walsingham rose from relative obscurity to become one of the small coterie who directed the Elizabethan state, overseeing foreign, domestic and religious policy. He served as English ambassador to France in the early 1570s and witnessed the St. Bartholomew's Day massacre. As principal secretary, he supported overseas exploration and colonisation, the development of the English navy and the plantations of Ireland. He worked to bring Scotland and England together. His foreign policy demonstrated a new understanding of the role of England as a maritime Protestant power with intercontinental trading ties. He oversaw operations that penetrated Spanish military preparation, gathered intelligence from across Europe, disrupted a range of plots against Elizabeth and secured the execution of Mary, Queen of Scots.

== Origins and early life ==
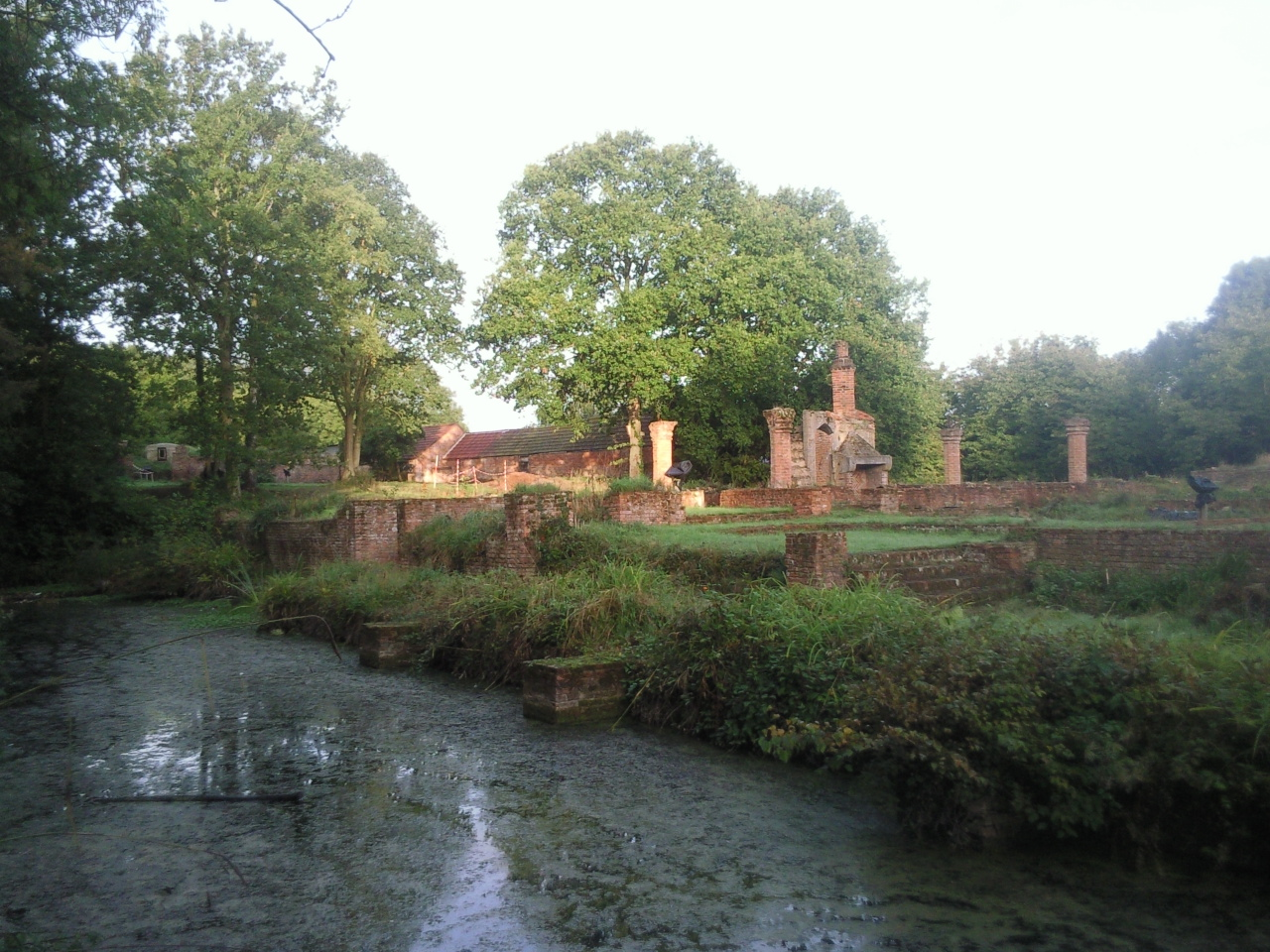
Ruins of Scadbury Hall, seat of the Walsingham family, Chislehurst, Kent

Francis Walsingham was born around 1532, probably at Foots Cray, near Chislehurst in Kent, the only son of William Walsingham (died 1534), a successful and well-connected London lawyer who served as a member of the commission appointed to investigate the estates of Cardinal Thomas Wolsey in 1530. William's elder brother was Sir Edmund Walsingham, Lieutenant of the Tower of London.

Francis's mother was Joyce Denny, a daughter of the courtier Sir Edmund Denny of Cheshunt in Hertfordshire, and a sister of the courtier Sir Anthony Denny, the principal Gentleman of the Privy Chamber to King Henry VIII. After the death of her first husband she married the courtier Sir John Carey in 1538. Carey's brother William was the husband of Mary Boleyn, the elder sister of Anne Boleyn, the second wife of King Henry VIII.

Of Francis's five siblings, Mary married Sir Walter Mildmay, who was Chancellor of the Exchequer for over 20 years, and Elizabeth married the parliamentarian Peter Wentworth.

Francis Walsingham matriculated at King's College, Cambridge, in 1548 with many other Protestants but as an undergraduate of high social status did not sit for a degree. From 1550 or 1551, he travelled in continental Europe, returning to England by 1552 to enrol at Gray's Inn, one of the qualifying bodies for English lawyers.

Upon the death in 1553 of Henry VIII's successor, Edward VI, Edward's Catholic half-sister Mary became queen. Many wealthy Protestants, such as John Foxe and John Cheke, fled England, and Walsingham was among them. He continued his studies in law at the universities of Basel and Padua, where he was elected to the governing body by his fellow students in 1555.

== Rise to power ==
Mary I died in November 1558 and was succeeded by her Protestant half-sister Elizabeth. Walsingham returned to England and through the support of one of his fellow former exiles, Francis Russell, 2nd Earl of Bedford, he was elected to Elizabeth's first parliament as the member for Bossiney, Cornwall, in 1559. At the subsequent election in 1563, he was returned for both Lyme Regis, Dorset, another constituency under Bedford's influence, and Banbury, Oxfordshire. He chose to sit for Lyme Regis. In January 1562 he married Anne, daughter of Sir George Barne, Lord Mayor of London in 1552–3, and widow of wine merchant Alexander Carleill. Anne died two years later leaving her son Christopher Carleill in Walsingham's care. In 1566, Walsingham married Ursula St. Barbe, widow of Sir Richard Worsley, and Walsingham acquired her estates of Appuldurcombe and Carisbrooke Priory on the Isle of Wight. The following year, they had a daughter, Frances. Walsingham's other two stepsons, Ursula's sons John and George, were killed in a gunpowder accident at Appuldurcombe in 1567.

In the following years, Walsingham became active in soliciting support for the Huguenots in France and developed a friendly and close working relationship with Nicholas Throckmorton, his predecessor as MP for Lyme Regis and a former ambassador to France. By 1569, Walsingham was working with William Cecil to counteract plots against Elizabeth. He was instrumental in the collapse of the Ridolfi plot, which hoped to replace Elizabeth with the Catholic Mary, Queen of Scots. He is credited with writing propaganda decrying a conspiratorial marriage between Mary and Thomas Howard, 4th Duke of Norfolk, (Note: Discourse Touching the Pretended Match Between the Duke of Norfolk and the Queen of Scots: some biographers think he was the writer, but others do not.) and Roberto di Ridolfi, after whom the plot was named, was interrogated at Walsingham's house.

In 1570, the Queen chose Walsingham to support the Huguenots in their negotiations with Charles IX of France. Later that year, he succeeded Sir Henry Norris as English ambassador in Paris. One of his duties was to continue negotiations for a marriage between Elizabeth and Charles IX's younger brother Henry, Duke of Anjou. The marriage plan was eventually dropped on the grounds of Henry's Catholicism. A substitute match with the youngest brother, Francis, Duke of Alençon, was proposed but Walsingham considered him ugly and "void of a good humour". Elizabeth was 20 years older than Alençon, and was concerned that the age difference would be seen as absurd. Walsingham believed that it would serve England better to seek a military alliance with France against Spanish interests. The defensive Treaty of Blois was concluded between France and England in 1572, but the treaty made no provision for a royal marriage and left the question of Elizabeth's successor open.

The Huguenots and other European Protestant interests supported the nascent revolt in the Spanish Netherlands, which were provinces of Habsburg Spain. When Catholic opposition to this course in France resulted in the death of Huguenot leader Gaspard de Coligny and the St. Bartholomew's Day massacre, Walsingham's house in Paris became a temporary sanctuary for Protestant refugees, including Philip Sidney. Ursula, who was pregnant, escaped to England with their four-year-old daughter. She gave birth to a second girl, Mary, in January 1573 while Walsingham was still in France. He returned to England in April 1573, having established himself as a competent official whom the Queen and Cecil could trust. He cultivated contacts throughout Europe, and a century later his dispatches would be published as The Complete Ambassador.

In the December following his return, Walsingham was appointed to the Privy Council of England and was made joint principal secretary (the position which later became "Secretary of State") with Sir Thomas Smith. Smith retired in 1576, leaving Walsingham in effective control of the privy seal, though he was not formally invested as Lord Privy Seal. Walsingham acquired a Surrey county seat in Parliament from 1572 that he retained until his death, but he was not a major parliamentarian. He was knighted on 1 December 1577, and held the sinecure posts of Recorder of Colchester, custos rotulorum of Hampshire, and High Steward of Salisbury, Ipswich and Winchester. He was appointed Chancellor of the Order of the Garter from 22 April 1578 until succeeded by Sir Amias Paulet in June 1587, when he became Chancellor of the Duchy of Lancaster in addition to principal secretary.

== Secretary of State ==
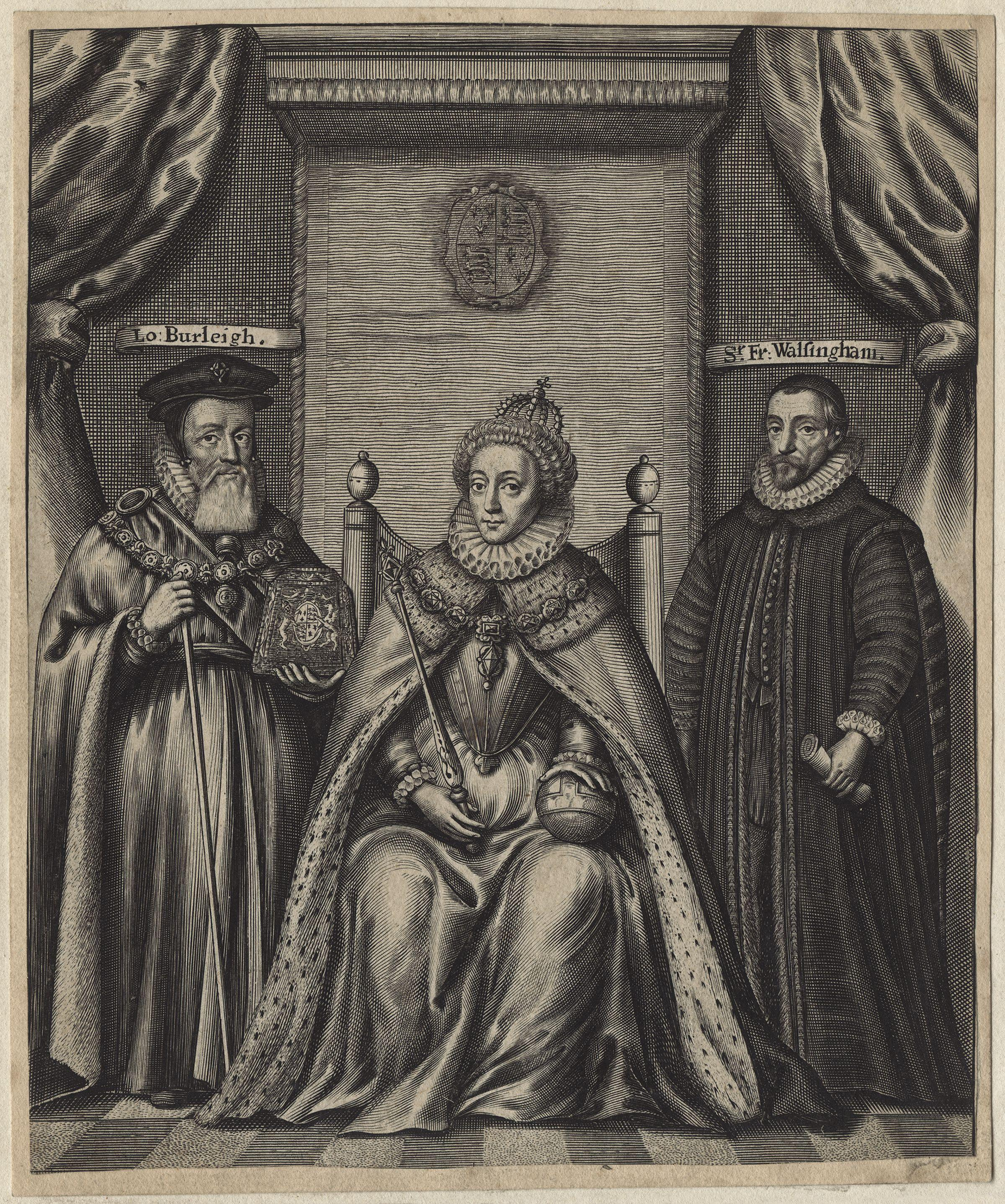
Seventeenth-century engraving of Queen Elizabeth with William Cecil (left) and Francis Walsingham (right)

The duties of the principal secretary were not defined formally, but as he handled all royal correspondence and determined the agenda of council meetings, he could wield great influence in all matters of policy and in every field of government, both foreign and domestic. During his term of office, Walsingham supported the use of England's maritime power to open new trade routes and explore the New World, and was at the heart of international affairs. He was involved directly with English policy towards Spain, the Netherlands, Scotland, Ireland and France, and embarked on several diplomatic missions to neighbouring European states.

Closely linked to the mercantile community, he actively supported trade promotion schemes and invested in the Muscovy Company and the Levant Company. He supported the attempts of John Davis and Martin Frobisher to discover the Northwest Passage and exploit the mineral resources of Labrador, and encouraged Humphrey Gilbert's exploration of Newfoundland. Gilbert's voyage was largely financed by recusant Catholics and Walsingham favoured the scheme as a potential means of removing Catholics from England by encouraging emigration to the New World. Walsingham was among the promoters of Francis Drake's profitable 1578–1581 circumnavigation of the world, correctly judging that Spanish possessions in the Pacific were vulnerable to attack. The venture was calculated to promote the Protestant interest by embarrassing and weakening the Spanish, as well as to seize Spanish treasure. The first edition of Richard Hakluyt's Principal Navigation, Voyages and Discoveries of the English Nation was dedicated to Walsingham.

Walsingham advocated direct intervention in the Netherlands in support of the Protestant revolt against Spain, on the grounds that although wars of conquest were unjust, wars in defence of religious liberty and freedom were not. Cecil was more circumspect and advised a policy of mediation, a policy that Elizabeth endorsed. Walsingham was sent on a special embassy to the Netherlands in 1578, to sound out a potential peace deal and gather military intelligence.

Charles IX died in 1574 and the Duke of Anjou inherited the French throne as Henry III. Between 1578 and 1581 the Queen resurrected attempts to negotiate a marriage with Henry III's youngest brother, the Duke of Alençon, who had put himself forward as a protector of the Huguenots and a potential leader of the Dutch. Walsingham was sent to France in mid-1581 to discuss an Anglo-French alliance, but the French wanted the marriage agreed first and Walsingham was under instruction to obtain a treaty before committing to the marriage. He returned to England without an agreement. Personally, Walsingham opposed the marriage, perhaps to the point of encouraging public opposition. Alençon was a Catholic and as his elder brother, Henry III, was childless, he was heir presumptive to the French throne. Elizabeth was past the age of childbearing and had no clear successor. If she died while married to him, her realms could fall under French control. By comparing the match of Elizabeth and Alençon with the match of the Protestant Henry of Navarre and the Catholic Margaret of Valois, which occurred in the week before the St. Bartholomew's Day massacre, the "most horrible spectacle" he had ever witnessed, Walsingham raised the spectre of religious riots in England in the event of the marriage proceeding. Elizabeth put up with his blunt, often unwelcome, advice, and acknowledged his strong beliefs in a letter, in which she called him "her Moor [who] cannot change his colour". (Note: The nickname "Moor" perhaps derived from his complexion or his preference for plain black clothes.)

These were years of tension in policy towards France, with Walsingham sceptical of the unpredictable Henry III and distrustful of the English ambassador in Paris, Edward Stafford. Stafford, who was compromised by his gambling debts, was in the pay of the Spanish and passed vital information to Spain. Walsingham may have been aware of Stafford's duplicity, as he fed the ambassador false information, presumably in the hope of fooling or confusing the Spanish.

The pro-English Regent of Scotland James Douglas, 4th Earl of Morton, whom Walsingham had supported, was overthrown in 1578. After the collapse of the Raid of Ruthven, another initiative to secure a pro-English government in Scotland, Walsingham reluctantly visited the Scottish court in August 1583, knowing that his diplomatic mission was unlikely to succeed. James VI dismissed Walsingham's advice on domestic policy saying he was an "absolute King" in Scotland. Walsingham replied with a discourse on the topic that "young princes were many times carried into great errors upon an opinion of the absoluteness of their royal authority and do not consider, that when they transgress the bounds and limits of the law, they leave to be kings and become tyrants." According to James Melville of Halhill, James VI intended to give Walsingham a valuable diamond ring as a parting gift, but James Stewart, Earl of Arran, who Walsingham had ignored, substituted a ring of crystal. A mutual defence pact was eventually agreed in the Treaty of Berwick of 1586.

Walsingham's cousin Edward Denny fought in Ireland during the rebellion of the Earl of Desmond and was one of the English settlers granted land in Munster confiscated from Desmond. Walsingham's stepson Christopher Carleill commanded the garrisons at Coleraine and Carrickfergus. Walsingham thought Irish farmland was underdeveloped and hoped that plantation would improve the productivity of estates. Tensions between the native Irish and the English settlers had lasting effects on the history of Ireland.

Walsingham's younger daughter Mary died aged seven in July 1580; his elder daughter, Frances, married Sir Philip Sidney on 21 September 1583, despite the Queen's initial objections to the match (for unknown reasons) earlier in the year. As part of the marriage agreement, Walsingham agreed to pay £1,500 of Sidney's debts and gave his daughter and son-in-law the use of his manor at Barn Elms in Surrey. A granddaughter born in November 1585 was named Elizabeth after the Queen, who was one of two godparents along with Sidney's uncle, Robert Dudley, 1st Earl of Leicester. The following year, Sidney was killed fighting the Spanish in the Netherlands and Walsingham was faced with paying off more of Sidney's extensive debts. His widowed daughter gave birth, in a difficult delivery, to a second child shortly afterward, but the baby, a girl, was stillborn.

== Espionage ==
Walsingham was driven by Protestant zeal to counter Catholicism, and sanctioned the use of torture against Catholic priests and suspected conspirators. Edmund Campion was among those tortured and found guilty on the basis of extracted evidence; he was hanged, drawn and quartered at Tyburn in 1581. Walsingham could never forget the atrocities against Protestants he had witnessed in France during the Bartholomew's Day massacre and believed a similar slaughter would occur in England in the event of a Catholic resurgence. Walsingham's brother-in-law Robert Beale, who was in Paris with Walsingham at the time of the massacre, encapsulated Walsingham's view: "I think it time and more than time for us to awake out of our dead sleep, and take heed lest like mischief as has already overwhelmed the brethren and neighbours in France and Flanders embrace us which be left in such sort as we shall not be able to escape." Walsingham tracked down Catholic priests in England and supposed conspirators by employing informers, and intercepting correspondence. Walsingham's staff in England included the cryptographer Thomas Phelippes, who was an expert in forgery and deciphering letters, and Arthur Gregory, who was skilled at breaking and repairing seals without detection.

In May 1582, letters from the Spanish ambassador in England, Bernardino de Mendoza, to contacts in Scotland were found on a messenger by Sir John Forster, who forwarded them to Walsingham. The letters indicated a conspiracy among the Catholic powers to invade England and displace Elizabeth with Mary, Queen of Scots. By April 1583, Walsingham had a spy, identified as Giordano Bruno by historian John Bossy, (Note: Walsingham's spy signed his reports "Henry Fagot". In 1991, Professor John Bossy of the University of York argued in his work Giordano Bruno and the Embassy Affair that Fagot was Bruno. Some biographers accept Bossy's identification, but critics of Bossy think his case is circumstantial.) deployed in the French embassy in London. Walsingham's contact reported that Francis Throckmorton, a nephew of Walsingham's old friend Nicholas Throckmorton, had visited the ambassador, Michel de Castelnau. In November 1583, after six months of surveillance, Walsingham had Throckmorton arrested and then tortured to secure a confession—an admission of guilt that clearly implicated Mendoza. The Throckmorton plot called for an invasion of England along with a domestic uprising to liberate Mary, Queen of Scots, and depose Elizabeth. Throckmorton was executed in 1584 and Mendoza was expelled from England. Walsingham is often mentioned – negatively – in coded letters from Mary, Queen of Scots, to the French ambassador.

=== Entrapment of Mary, Queen of Scots ===
After the assassination in mid-1584 of William the Silent, the leader of the Dutch revolt against Spain, English military intervention in the Low Countries was agreed in the Treaties of Nonsuch of 1585. The murder of William the Silent also reinforced fears for Queen Elizabeth's safety. Walsingham helped create the Bond of Association, the signatories of which promised to hunt down and kill anyone who conspired against Elizabeth. The Act for the Surety of the Queen's Person, passed by Parliament in March 1585, set up a legal process for trying any claimant to the throne implicated in plots against the Queen. The following month Mary, Queen of Scots, was placed in the strict custody of Sir Amias Paulet, a friend of Walsingham. At Christmas, she was moved to a moated manor house at Chartley. Walsingham instructed Paulet to open, read and pass to Mary unsealed any letters that she received, and to block any potential route for clandestine correspondence. In a successful attempt to entrap her, Walsingham arranged a single exception: a covert means for Mary's letters to be smuggled in and out of Chartley in a beer keg. Mary was misled into thinking these secret letters were secure, while in reality they were deciphered and read by Walsingham's agents. In July 1586, Anthony Babington wrote to Mary about an impending plot to free her and kill Elizabeth. Mary's reply was clearly encouraging and sanctioned Babington's plans. Walsingham had Babington and his associates rounded up; fourteen were executed in September 1586. In October, Mary was put on trial under the Act for the Surety of the Queen's Person in front of 36 commissioners, including Walsingham.

During the presentation of evidence against her, Mary broke down and pointed accusingly at Walsingham saying, "all of this is the work of Monsieur de Walsingham for my destruction", to which he replied, "God is my witness that as a private person I have done nothing unworthy of an honest man, and as Secretary of State, nothing unbefitting my duty." Mary was found guilty and the warrant for her execution was drafted, but Elizabeth hesitated to sign it, despite pressure from Walsingham. Walsingham wrote to Paulet urging him to find "some way to shorten the life" of Mary to relieve Elizabeth of the burden, to which Paulet replied indignantly, "God forbid that I should make so foul a shipwreck of my conscience, or leave so great a blot to my poor posterity, to shed blood without law or warrant." Walsingham made arrangements for Mary's execution; Elizabeth signed the warrant on 1 February 1587 and entrusted it to William Davison, who had been appointed as junior Secretary of State in late September 1586. Davison passed the warrant to Cecil and a privy council convened by Cecil without Elizabeth's knowledge agreed to carry out the sentence as soon as was practical. Within a week, Mary was beheaded. On hearing of the execution, Elizabeth claimed not to have sanctioned the action and that she had not meant Davison to part with the warrant. Davison was arrested and imprisoned in the Tower of London. Walsingham's share of Elizabeth's displeasure was small because he was absent from court, at home ill, in the weeks just before and after the execution. Davison was eventually released in October 1588, on the orders of Cecil and Walsingham.

=== Spanish Armada ===
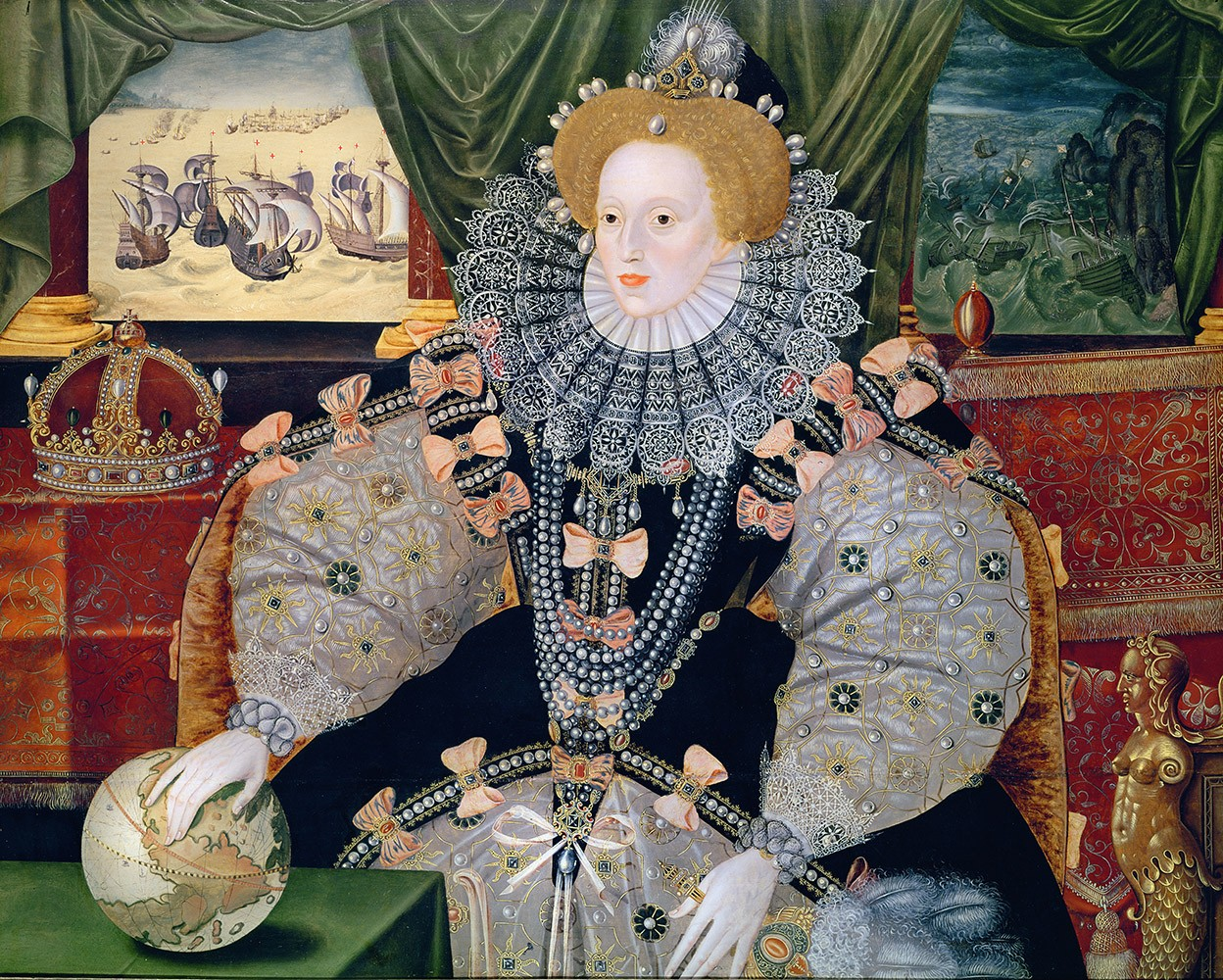
Famous portrait of Elizabeth I after the defeat of the Spanish Armada

From 1586, Walsingham received many dispatches from his agents in mercantile communities and foreign courts detailing Spanish preparations for an invasion of England. Walsingham's recruitment of Anthony Standen, a friend of the Tuscan ambassador to Madrid, was an exceptional intelligence triumph and Standen's dispatches were deeply revealing. Walsingham worked to prepare England for a potential war with Spain, in particular by supervising the substantial rebuilding of Dover Harbour, and encouraging a more aggressive strategy. On Walsingham's instructions, the English ambassador in Turkey, William Harborne, attempted unsuccessfully to persuade the Ottoman Sultan to attack Spanish possessions in the Mediterranean in the hope of distracting Spanish forces. Walsingham supported Francis Drake's raid of Cadiz in 1587, which wrought havoc with Spanish logistics. The Spanish Armada sailed for England in July 1588. Walsingham received regular dispatches from the English naval forces, and raised his own troop of 260 men as part of the land defences. On 18 August 1588, after the dispersal of the armada, naval commander Lord Henry Seymour wrote to Walsingham, "you have fought more with your pen than many have in our English navy fought with their enemies".

In foreign intelligence, Walsingham's extensive network of "intelligencers", who passed on general news as well as secrets, spanned Europe and the Mediterranean. While foreign intelligence was a normal part of the principal secretary's activities, Walsingham brought to it flair and ambition, and large sums of his own money. He cast his net more widely than others had done previously: expanding and exploiting links across the continent as well as in Constantinople and Algiers, and building and inserting contacts among Catholic exiles. Among his spies may have been the playwright Christopher Marlowe; Marlowe was in France in the mid-1580s and was acquainted with Walsingham's kinsman Thomas Walsingham.

== Death and legacy ==
From 1571 onwards, Walsingham complained of ill health and often retired to his country estate for periods of recuperation. He complained of "sundry carnosities", pains in his head, stomach and back, and difficulty in passing urine. Suggested diagnoses include cancer, kidney stones, urinary infection, and diabetes. He died on 6 April 1590, at his house in Seething Lane. Historian William Camden wrote that Walsingham died from "a carnosity growing intra testium tunicas [testicular cancer]". He was buried privately in a simple ceremony at 10 pm on the following day, beside his son-in-law, in Old St Paul's Cathedral. The grave and monument were destroyed in the Great Fire of London in 1666. His name appears on a modern monument in the crypt listing the important graves lost.

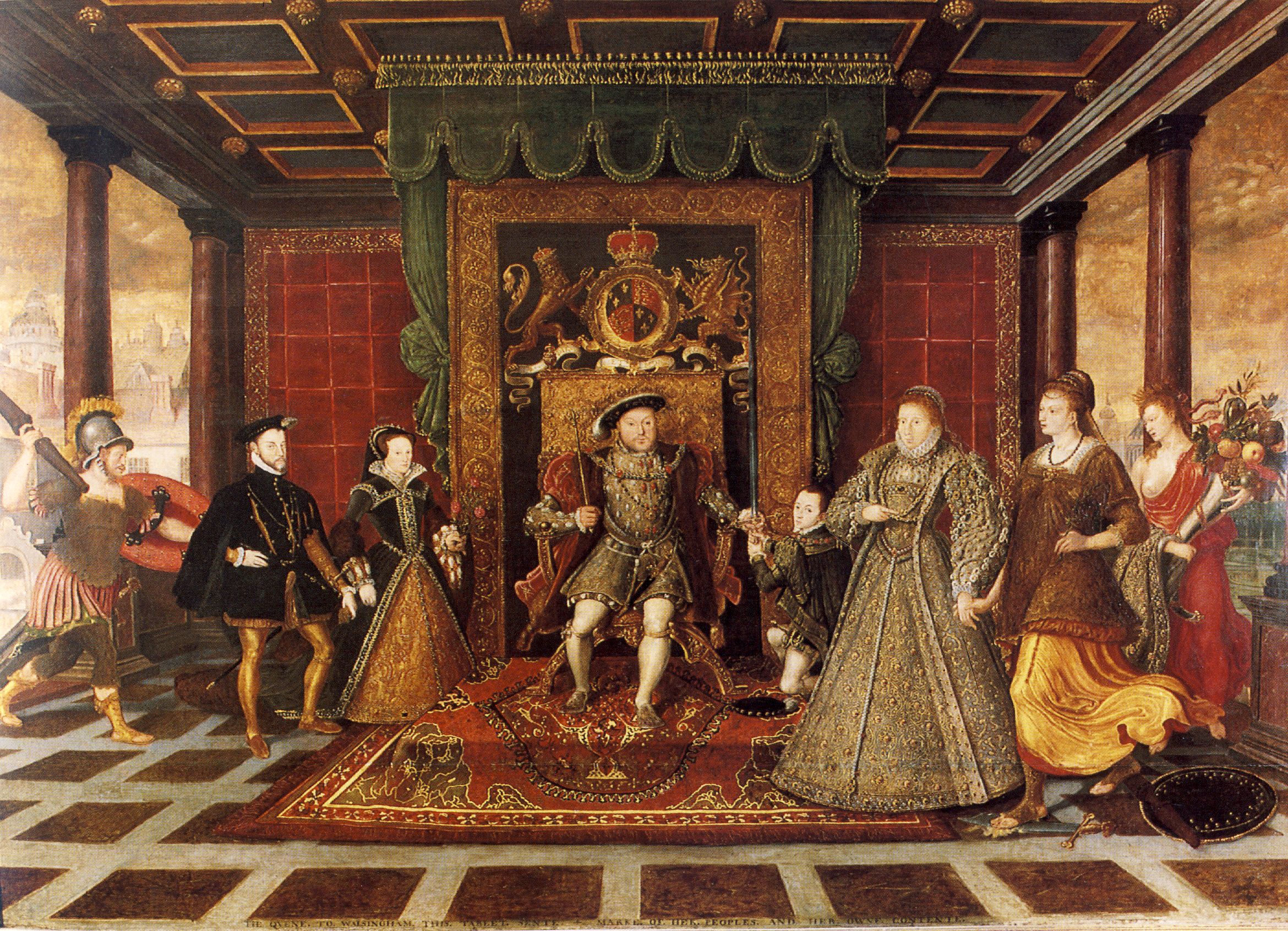
An Allegory of the Tudor Succession was a gift from Elizabeth to Walsingham. The bottom of the picture is inscribed "The Queen to Walsingham this tablet sent; Mark of her people's and her own content."

In his will, dated 12 December 1589, Walsingham complained of "the greatness of my debts and the mean state [I] shall leave my wife and heirs in", but the true state of his finances is unclear. He received grants of land from the Queen, grants for the export of cloth and leases of customs in the northern and western ports. His primary residences, apart from the court, were in Seething Lane by the Tower of London (now the site of a Victorian office building called Walsingham House), at Barn Elms in Surrey and at Odiham in Hampshire. Nothing remains of any of his houses. He spent much of his own money on espionage in the service of the Queen and the Protestant cause. In 1586, he funded a lectureship in theology at Oxford University for the Puritan John Rainolds. He had underwritten the debts of his son-in-law, Sir Philip Sidney, had pursued the Sidney estate for recompense unsuccessfully and had carried out major land transactions in his later years. After his death, his friends reflected that poor bookkeeping had left him further in the Crown's debt than was fair. In 1611, the Crown's debts to him were calculated at over £48,000, but his debts to the Crown were calculated at over £43,000 and a judge, Sir Julius Caesar, ordered both sets of debts cancelled quid pro quo. Walsingham's surviving daughter Frances received a £300 annuity, and married the Earl of Essex. Ursula, Lady Walsingham, continued to live at Barn Elms with a staff of servants until her death in 1602.

Protestants lauded Walsingham as "a sound pillar of our commonwealth and chief patron of virtue, learning and chivalry". He was part of a Protestant intelligentsia that included Philip Sidney, Edmund Spenser and John Dee: men who promoted an expansionist and nationalist English Renaissance. Spenser included a dedicatory sonnet to Walsingham in the Faerie Queene, likening him to Maecenas who introduced Virgil to the Emperor Augustus. After Walsingham's death, Sir John Davies composed an acrostic poem in his memory and Watson wrote an elegy, Meliboeus, in Latin. On the other hand, Jesuit Robert Persons thought Walsingham "cruel and inhumane" in his persecution of Catholics. Catholic sources portray a ruthless, devious man driven by religious intolerance and an excessive love for intrigue. (Note: William Camden wrote, "the Papists accused him as a cunning workman in complotting his business and alluring men into dangers, whilst he diligently searched out their hidden practices against religion, his prince and country.") Walsingham attracts controversy still. Although he was ruthless, his opponents on the Catholic side were no less so; the treatment of prisoners and suspects by Tudor authorities was typical of European governments of the time. Walsingham's personal, as opposed to his public, character is elusive; his public papers were seized by the government while many of his private papers, which might have revealed much, were lost. The fragments that do survive demonstrate his personal interest in gardening and falconry.

=== Portrayal in fiction ===
Fictional portrayals of Walsingham tend to follow Catholic interpretations, depicting him as sinister and Machiavellian. He features in conspiracy theories surrounding the death of Christopher Marlowe, whom he predeceased. Charles Nicholl examined (and rejected) such theories in The Reckoning: The Murder of Christopher Marlowe (1992), which was used as a source by Anthony Burgess for his novel A Dead Man in Deptford (1993).

The 1998 film Elizabeth gives considerable, although sometimes historically inaccurate, prominence to Walsingham (portrayed by Geoffrey Rush). It portrays him as irreligious and sexually ambiguous, merges chronologically distant events, and inaccurately suggests that he murdered Mary of Guise. Rush reprised the role in the 2007 sequel, Elizabeth: The Golden Age. Both Stephen Murray in the 1971 BBC series Elizabeth R and Patrick Malahide in the 2005 Channel Four miniseries Elizabeth I play him as a dour official.

== Citations ==
Political offices
Preceded by Sir Henry Norris	English Ambassador to France; 1570–1573	Succeeded by Valentine Dale
Preceded by Sir Thomas Smith	Secretary of State; 1573–1590; With: Sir Thomas Smith 1573–1576; Thomas Wilson 1577–1581; William Davison 1586–1587	Succeeded by The Lord Burghley as acting secretary
Preceded by Sir Ralph Sadler	Chancellor of the Duchy of Lancaster; 1587–1590	Succeeded by Sir Thomas Heneage
Honorary titles
Preceded by The Marquess of Winchester	Custos rotulorum of Hampshire; 1577–1590	Succeeded by Sir George Carey
Preceded by Sir Thomas Smith	Chancellor of the Order of the Garter; 1578–1587	Succeeded by Sir Amias Paulet
