= George Dacres =

16th-century English politician

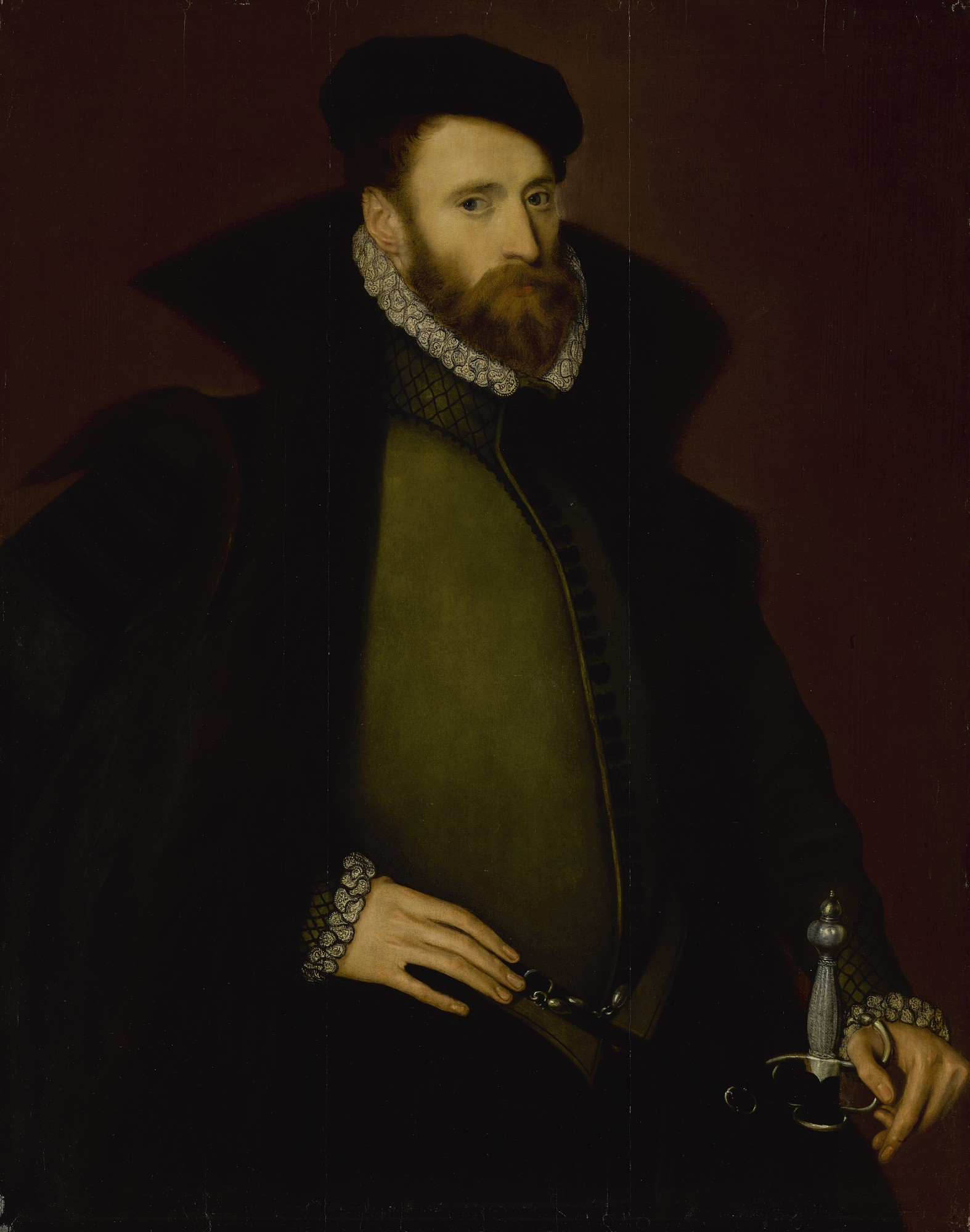
Portrait by Steven van der Meulen, around 1560

George Dacres (c. 1533–1580), of Cheshunt, Hertfordshire, was an English politician.

He was a member (MP) of the Parliament of England for Castle Rising in 1571. He married Elizabeth Carew and they had two daughters.

Their daughter Margaret married George Garrard, one of the sons of Sir William Garrard (Lord Mayor of London 1555–1556).
