= Thomas Carew (MP for Saltash) =

16th-century English politician

Member of Parliament for Saltash
- In office 1563

Member of Parliament for Plymouth
- In office 1555

Personal details
- Born: 1526 or 1527
- Died: 12 February 1565 (aged 37-39)
- Spouse: Elizabeth Edgecombe
- Children: Richard Carew; George Carew; Son; Daughter
- Parent: Wymond Carew (father)
- Relatives: Richard Carew (grandson)
- Education: St John's College, Cambridge

Thomas Carew (1526/27 – 12 February 1565) was an English lawyer and politician who sat in the House of Commons between 1555 and 1565.

== Biography ==
Carew was the son of Sir Wymond Carew of East Anthony Cornwall. He matriculated from St John's College, Cambridge in Autumn 1548. He was admitted at the Inner Temple in November 1550.

In 1555, Carew was elected Member of Parliament for Plymouth. He was elected MP for Saltash in 1563.

He married Elizabeth, the daughter of Sir Richard Edgecombe of Mount Edgcumbe and Cotehele, Cornwall. They had three sons, including Richard and George, and a one daughter.
