= Edmund Denny =

English courtier and politician

- Born: c. 1457/1461
- Died: 22 December 1520
- Spouse: Mary Troutbeck
- Children: 4+, including Anthony, Martha and Joyce
- Relatives: Francis Walsingham (grandson); Thomas Carew (grandson); Matthew Carew (grandson)

Arms of Denny: Gules, a saltire argent between twelve crosses pattée or

Sir Edmund Denny, of Cheshunt (c. 1457/1461 - died 22 December 1520) was a Tudor courtier and politician. He was a Baron of the Exchequer during the reign of Henry VIII of England.

His son, Sir Anthony Denny, rose to become the most powerful member of the Privy Council during the King's last years. Edmund's children also included:

- Martha Denny and
- Joyce Denny, wife of William Walsingham and then of Sir John Carey, and mother of Sir Francis Walsingham and Mary Walsingham, wife of Sir Walter Mildmay,
- Thomas Denny
