= William Carey (courtier) =

English courtier and favourite of King Henry VIII (c. 1495–1528)

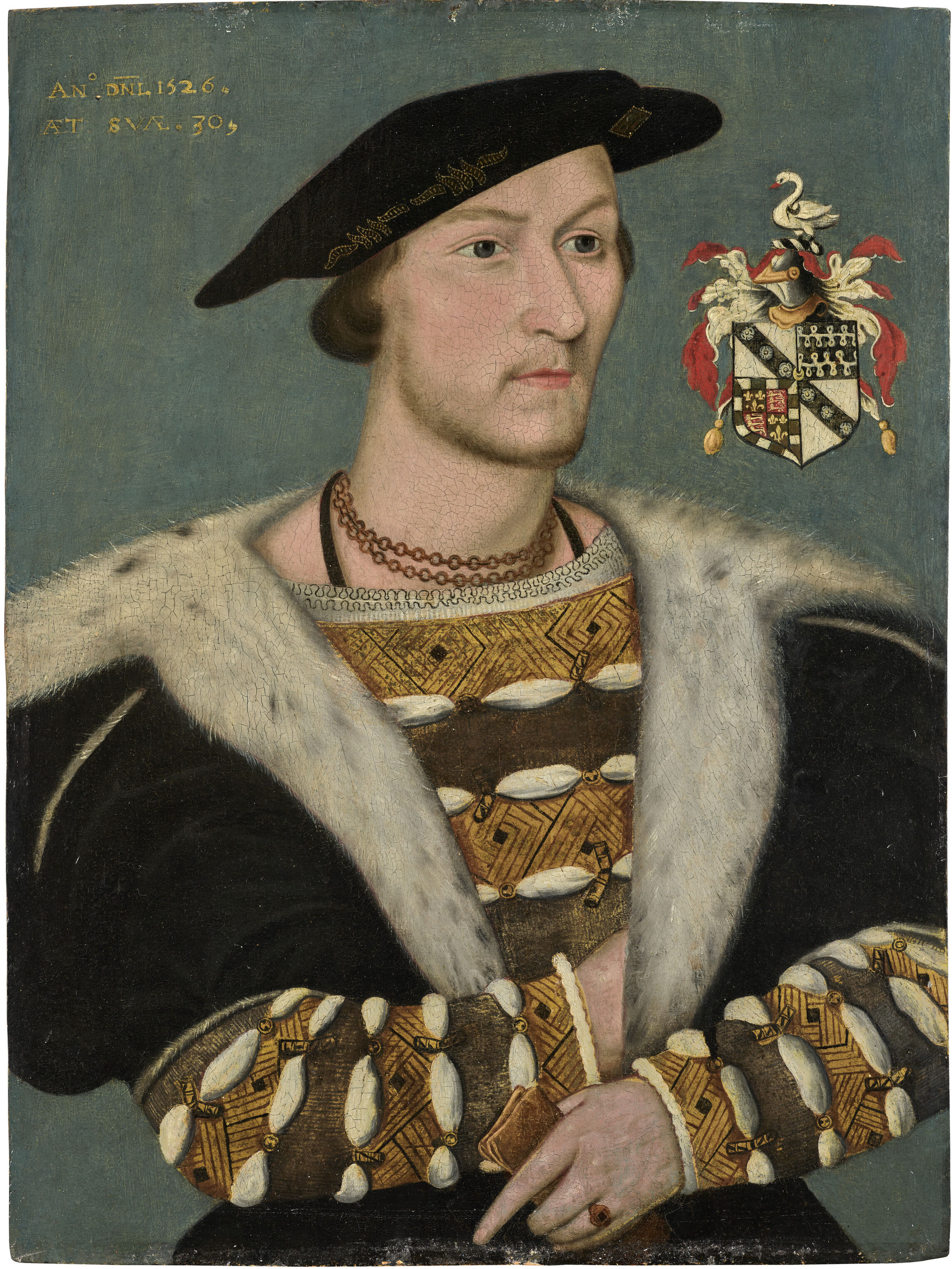
- William Carey, attributed to Hans Holbein the Younger. From a private Irish collection.
- Born: c. 1495
- Died: 22 June 1528 (aged 33)
- Spouse: Mary Boleyn (m. 1520)
- Children: Catherine Carey, Lady Knollys; Henry Carey, 1st Baron Hunsdon (both disputed)
- Parent(s): Thomas Carey; Margaret Spencer

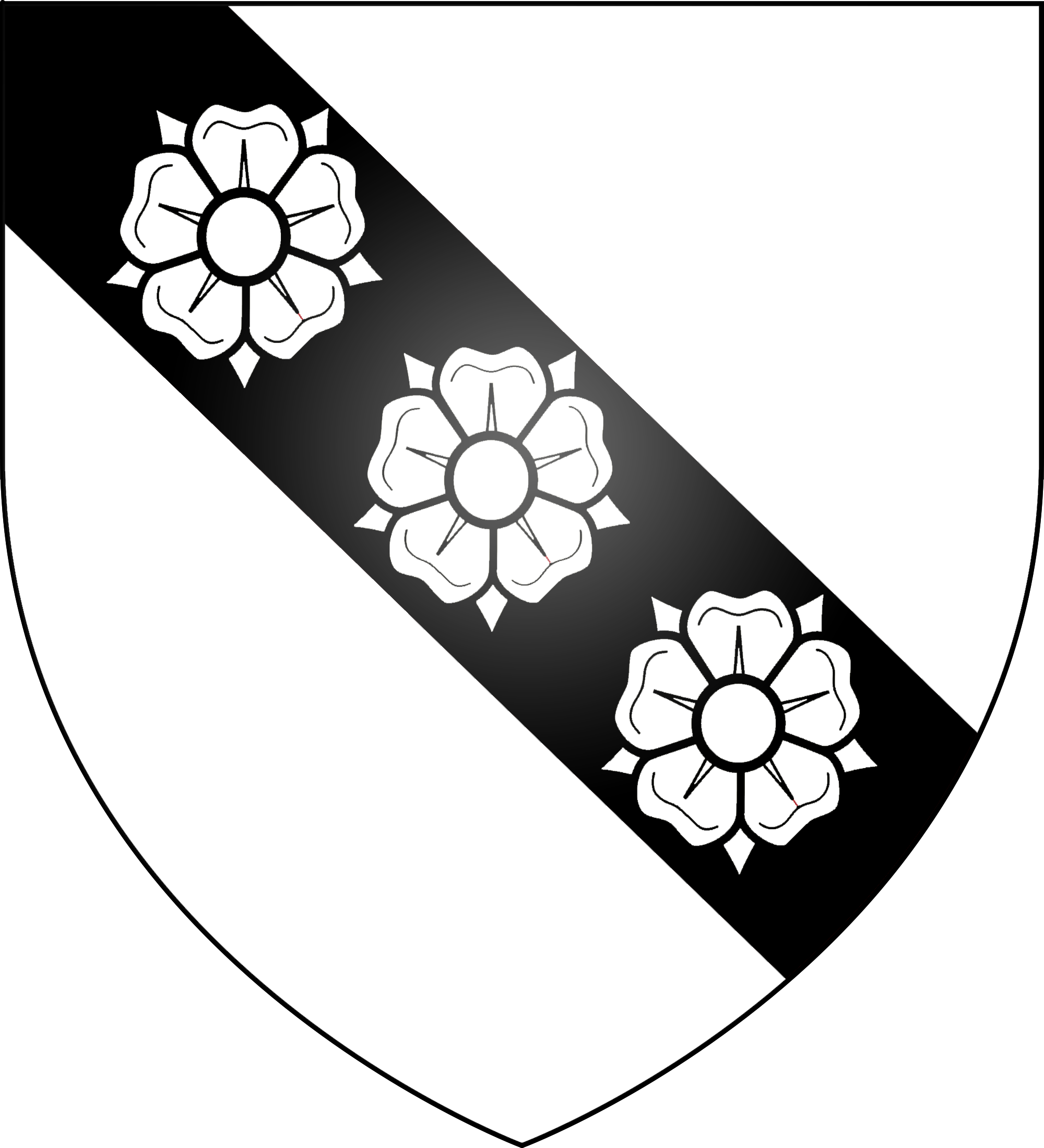
Arms of Cary: Argent, on a bend sable three roses of the field

William Carey (c. 1495 – 22 June 1528) was a courtier and favourite of King Henry VIII of England. He served the king as a Gentleman of the Privy chamber, and Esquire of the Body to the King. His wife, Mary Boleyn, is known to history as a mistress of King Henry VIII and the sister of Henry's second wife, Anne Boleyn.

== Biography ==
William Carey was the second son of Sir Thomas Carey (1455–1500), of Chilton Foliat in Wiltshire, and his wife, Margaret Spencer, daughter of Sir Robert Spencer and Lady Eleanor Beaufort, and grandson of Sir William Cary of Cockington, Devon, an eminent Lancastrian. This Cary family was anciently recorded in Devon, and originally held the manors at Cockington and Clovelly in that county. Eleanor was the daughter of Edmund Beaufort, 2nd Duke of Somerset, whose brother John Beaufort, 1st Duke of Somerset, was the father of Margaret Beaufort, Countess of Richmond and Derby, grandmother of King Henry VIII; thus William and Henry VIII were third cousins. William's maternal aunt was Catherine Spencer, Countess of Northumberland, and through her, he was first cousin to Henry Percy, 6th Earl of Northumberland, the former suitor of his sister-in-law Anne Boleyn.

On 4 February 1520, he was married to Mary Boleyn, the elder daughter of Thomas Boleyn, 1st Earl of Wiltshire and his wife, Elizabeth Howard. They owned Aldenham in Hertfordshire, but resided primarily at court.

Shortly after their marriage, Mary became the mistress of King Henry VIII. The Boleyns received grants of land, and Carey himself also profited, being granted manors and estates by the king while it was in progress.

Carey was also a noted art collector, and he introduced the famed Flemish artist, Lucas Horenbout, to the Kingdom of England in the mid-1520s. Perhaps one of the reasons the athletic King Henry VIII favoured Carey was the fact that Carey appears to have been fond of activities such as riding, hunting, and jousting. Carey distinguished himself in jousting at the Field of the Cloth of Gold in 1520.

Anne Boleyn, Mary's sister, caught Henry's eye a year after his affair with Mary ended. Henry proposed marriage to her in 1527. Carey's influence at court was used to try and get his sister Eleanor (a nun) elected as the Abbess of Wilton Abbey over the heir apparent who was Isabel Jordayne. The claim failed when it was revealed that Eleanor had two children by priests.

William Carey did not live to enjoy his sister-in-law's prosperity, since he died of the sweating sickness the following year. Brian Tuke, Henry's secretary at the time of Carey's death wrote this to Lord Legat the day after his death: "Now is word common that M. Cary, which before I came lay in the chamber where I lie, and with whom at my first coming I met here in this place, saying that he had been with his wife at Plashey, and would not be seen within, because he would ride again and hunt, is dead of the sweat. Our Lord have mercy on his soul; and hold his hand over us".

He died greatly in debt, and his wife was reduced to pawning her jewellery before Queen Anne Boleyn arranged a pension for her.

== Children of William Carey and Mary Boleyn ==
William Carey and Mary Boleyn were the parents of two children:

- Catherine Carey (c. 1524 – 15 January 1568). Maid of Honour to Anne of Cleves and Catherine Howard. She was married to the Puritan Sir Francis Knollys, Knight of the Garter. She was later lady-in-waiting to her cousin, Elizabeth I. One of her daughters, Lettice Knollys, became the second wife of Robert Dudley, 1st Earl of Leicester, the favourite of Elizabeth I.
- Henry Carey, 1st Baron Hunsdon (4 March 1526 – 23 July 1596). He was ennobled by Queen Elizabeth I just after her coronation and created Knight of the Garter in 1561. When Henry was dying, Elizabeth offered him the Boleyn family title, Earl of Ormonde, which he had long sought, but he refused the honour.

Because of Mary's affair, it has been suggested that Catherine and Henry may have been instead Henry VIII's biological children (see Issue of Mary Boleyn). The veracity of this claim is the subject of historical debate.

== Ancestry ==
Ancestors of William Carey (courtier)

16. Sir Robert Cary
8. Sir Philip Cary
17. Margaret Courtenay
4. Sir William Cary
18. William Orchard
9. Christina Orchard
2. Sir Thomas Carey
20. Henry de Fulford
10. Sir Baldwin Fulford
21. Wilhelma Langdon
5. Alice Furford
22. John Bosome or Bozon
11. Jennet or Elizabeth Bosome or Bozon
23. Rosamond St George
1. William Carey
12. John Spencer
6. Sir Robert Spencer
13. Joan
3. Margaret Spencer
28. John Beaufort, 1st Earl of Somerset
14. Edmund Beaufort, 2nd Duke of Somerset
29. Margaret Holland
7. Eleanor Beaufort
30. Richard de Beauchamp, 13th Earl of Warwick
15. Eleanor Beauchamp
31. Elizabeth Berkeley

== In popular culture ==
Carey's life, his marriage to Mary Carey, and his death are fictionalized in Philippa Gregory's novel The Other Boleyn Girl, where Mary is portrayed as younger than Anne. The story has been made into film twice, with Carey portrayed by Anthony Howell in the 2003 film and Benedict Cumberbatch in 2008.
