= Tudor Royal Progresses =

Royal tours of major cities in England

Tudor Royal Progresses were an important way for the Tudor monarchs to consolidate their rule throughout England. Following his victory at the Battle of Bosworth in August 1485, the first Tudor monarch, Henry VII, ensured his coronation (November 1485), called a parliament (November 1485), married Elizabeth of York (January 1486) – all in London before embarking on his first Royal Progress in March 1486. The last Tudor Royal Progress took place in summer 1602, as Elizabeth I, the last Tudor monarch died in March 1603.

== Henry VII: 1485–1509 ==
Henry VII traveled widely in England in his first few years as King, largely to consolidate his rule after the Wars of the Roses. As he grew older, and particularly after the death of his wife Queen Elizabeth in 1503, the King traveled less. The king spent most of his reign at Windsor Castle or Richmond Palace which he rebuilt in 1497 and where he died in 1509.

	Year	Months	Locations	Details
1	1486	March - August	Lincoln, Nottingham, York, Worcester, Hereford, Gloucester, Bristol and to Whitehall via Putney	Henry progressed to Lincoln for Easter, then to York, by way of Nottingham. While in York he dispersed the abortive rising of the Yorkists led by Lord Lovell. Henry VII then progressed south where he spent Whitsun in Worcester and by way of Bristol back to London. When the royal couple reached Putney where they progressed by barge back to Whitehall with the Lord Mayor of London.
1	1486	September–October	Winchester	Henry removed his wife Queen Elizabeth and the court to Winchester for the birth of his heir Prince Arthur, due to it being the supposed location of King Arthur's castle of Camelot. Prince Arthur was born on 20 September and christened on 24 September.
2	1487	May - October	Norwich, Walsingham, Kenilworth, Nottingham, then fought the Battle of Stoke Field, Lincoln, Pontefract, York, Durham and Newcastle-upon-Tyne	Henry progressed first to Norfolk and after visiting the shrine of Our Lady of Walsingham, moved to the Midlands to face and defeat the pretender Lambert Simnel at Battle of Stoke Field. After defeating the rebels Henry VII then celebrated his victory in Lincoln and moved north by way of Pontefract, York and Durham to Newcastle. While there he opened negotiations with James IV, before returning to London for his second parliament in November.
3	1492	September - November	Dover, Calais, Boulogne, Étaples, return to London via Kent	Henry VII launched an abortive invasion of France, traveling through Kent and the Pale of Calais, to besiege Boulogne, before agreeing to the Peace of Étaples after three weeks of campaigning and returning to London by 22 November.
4	1495	June–July	Lancashire, Lathom House and Knowsley Hall	Henry VII and Queen Elizabeth visited his step-father Thomas Stanley, 1st Earl of Derby at his new houses of Lathom and Knowsley Hall.
5	1497	October - November	Exeter	Henry VII visited Exeter to receive the submission of the city after the capture of the pretender Perkin Warbeck who had attempted to capture the city the previous month, He returned to London on 27 November.
6	1500	May - June	Calais	Henry VII traveled to Calais for discussions with Philip the Handsome Duke of Burgundy. The two met outside the walls of Calais on 9 June at St Peter Church.
7	1503	June - July	Collyweston	Henry VII escorted his daughter Margaret Tudor from Richmond Palace north, to the residence of his mother Margaret Beaufort of Collyweston Palace in Northamptonshire. This was a part of her journey north to Scotland to marry James IV.

== Henry VIII: 1509–1547 ==
Henry VIII traveled widely through the south of England and Calais in the first few years of his reign. As he grew older the King traveled less, the major exceptions being the major western progress of 1535 and the great northern progress of 1541. Henry spent the majority of his reign at his 55 royal palaces, the vast majority of which were in and around London.

	Year	Months	Locations	Details
1	1510	June - September	Christchurch Priory, Corfe Castle, Southampton, Salisbury, The Vyne, Rotherfield Greys Castle Malshanger and Woking	Henry VIII's first progress focused on Dorset and Hampshire. The King stayed with William Sandys, 1st Baron Sandys at The Vyne and with Robert Knollys at Rotherfield Greys Castle, ending with a tournament at Woking.
2	1511	January	Walsingham	Henry VIII visited Walsingham to give thanks for the birth of his short lived son Prince Henry.
2	1511	July–September	Northampton, Leicester, Nottingham, Coventry and Warwick	Henry VIII and Queen Katherine of Aragon traveled across the Midlands.
3	1513	June–October	Calais, Thérouanne, Lille, Tournai	As part of the War of the League of Cambrai Henry VIII invaded France by way of Calais in June 1513. He besieged the town of Thérouanne through the summer, defeating a French attempt to relieve the town at the Battle of the Spurs on 16 August. Thérouanne fell to the English on 22 August. Henry then moved on to besiege Tournai by way of Lille where he was hosted by Margaret of Austria, Duchess of Savoy. Tournai fell on 23 September, Henry attended mass in Tournai Cathedral on 2 October and returned to England via Calais on 21 October.
4	1520	May–July	Dover, Calais, Guînes, Field of the Cloth of Gold, Gravelines	1518 saw the Treaty of London (1518), also known as the treaty of perpetual peace between the major European powers. 1520 covered complex negotiations between Henry, Charles V and Francis I with Henry called upon to arbitrate between the two. The monarchs were also anxious to meet one another. After meeting with Charles on 27 May at Dover Henry proceeded separately, with Queen Katherine of Aragon and his court to Calais. In a valley between the Pale of Calais and the French possessions Henry and Francis met at the Field of the Cloth of Gold where from 7 June to 24 June both monarchs engaged in discussions, jousts dancing and other pageantry with their courts. After bidding goodbye to Francis Henry and Katherine then met with Charles and his aunt Margaret of Austria, Duchess of Savoy at Gravelines on 10 July. There they concluded a separate treaty of friendship and agreed not t make any new agreements with the French king for two years on 14 July, before Henry and Katherine returned to England.
5	1522	May–July	Dover, Canterbury, Sittingbourne, Rochester and Gravesend, Windsor, Winchester and Southampton	Charles V visited England on the way to Spain, landing at Dover on 26 May, to be met by Henry on 28 May. The two then traveled to Canterbury on 29 May and Sittingbourne on 30 May. They then traveled to Rochester on 1 June, and Greenwich Palace on 2 June via Gravesend. The two entered London on 6 June, staying until 9 June when they proceeded to Southwark, Richmond, Hampton Court and Windsor.They remained at Windsor from 12 to 20 June and signed the Treaty of Windsor (1522). They then travelled to Winchester where they arrived on 22 June and on 6 July Charles departed for Spain from Southampton.
6	1535	July–October	Windsor, Reading Abbey, Ewelme, Abingdon Abbey, Langley, Berkshire, Winchcombe, Tewkesbury, Gloucester, Leonard Stanley, Thornbury Castle, Berkeley Castle, Acton Court, Little Sodbury, Bromham House, Wolf Hall, Thruxton, Hurstbourne Priors, Winchester, Bishops Waltham, Southampton, Portchester Castle, Beaulieu Abbey, Salisbury, Hurstbourne Priors, The Vyne, Basing House, Elvetham Hall and Easthampstead.	Henry VIII and his second wife Queen Anne Boleyn went to the West Country in July 1535. They used Gloucester as a base for hunting trips to Painswick, Coberley, and Miserden. They then returned to London via Winchester. Detailed map below. Hernry VIII 1535 Progress
7	1541	August–October	Grimsthorpe Castle, Lincoln, York Pontefract Castle, Leconfield, Hull	The so called 'Great Northern progress' was the first visit of a king to Yorkshire since Henry VII's in 1487 (see above). Civil disturbance arising from the Pilgrimage of Grace and the dissolution of the monasteries were possible spurs to action, but the King’s assurances from 1537 that he would ‘go and see his country of the North’ came to nothing as the preparations were repeatedly postponed. In 1541, however, there was a new reason to come to York: Henry planned to meet his nephew King James V of Scotland, to calm the centuries-old hostility between the two nations and perhaps to negotiate an alliance between them. The court left London for a tour of the north of England and arrived in York, via Lincoln, on 16 September. Ultimately James V did not arrive and so the royal entourage repaired to Leconfield to continue the evaluation of the fortifications at the port of Hull. The king and queen left Hull to return to London on 6 October.
8	1544	July–September	Dover, Calais and Boulogne	Henry VIII launched his final invasion of France as part of the Italian War of 1542–1546. He crossed the Channel and took personal command of the Sieges of Boulogne (1544–1546), the first of which ended in an English victory on 14 September 1544., Henry personally entered Boulogne on 18 September, before returning to England.

== Edward VI: 1547–1553 ==
1552: Edward VI embarked on a short progress to Guildford, but this was soon abandoned.

== Mary I: 1553–1558 ==
As a Princess, Mary Tudor accompanied her father on royal progresses.

- 1525–1526; as Princess; September, Thornbury Castle and Gloucester; November, Tewkesbury; January, Tickenhill and Worcester; April, Hartlebury Castle.
- 1526: as Princess; Coventry.

As Queen, Mary was less ardent about making royal progresses. The unpopularity of her husband and her own ill health led her to remain in her royal residencies near London.

- 1554: Following her marriage to Philip II of Spain in Winchester, the newly weds proceeded to London via their royal residencies in Basing House, Windsor Castle and Richmond Palace.

== Elizabeth I: 1558–1603 ==
The Elizabethan Royal Progresses played an important role in enabling Elizabeth I to exercise and maintain her royal authority. During each year of her 44 years reign she insisted her court accompanied her on a progress in the spring and summer months.

- 1558: November, Monken Hadley and London Charterhouse.
- 1559: July–August, Dartford Priory, Cobham Hall, Gillingham, Otford Palace, Eltham Palace, Croydon Palace, Nonsuch Palace
- 1561: Suffolk
- 1564: Cambridge.
- 1566: Houghton Conquest, 9 July; Fotheringhay Castle, 22 July; Collyweston; Greyfriars, Stamford, 5 August; Grimsthorpe Castle; Deene Park; Oxford, 31 August.
- 1572: Warwick
- 1573: Kent; August, Sandwich.
- 1574: Havering (May); Bristol.
- 1575: Woodstock; Kenilworth; August, Worcester; Shrewsbury; Lichfield
- 1578: July and August, East Anglia; Bury St Edmunds, Euston Hall, Norwich.
- 1591: Surrey, Sussex, Hampshire; August, Cowdray House
- 1592: Oxford; August, Bisham; September, Sudeley Castle; October, Ryecote; Elvetham
- 1602: August, Harefield.
