= HM Prison Huntercombe =

Prison in Oxfordshire, England

Coordinates: 51.5874°N 1.0183°W

HMP Huntercombe
- Interactive map of HMP Huntercombe
- Location: Nuffield, Oxfordshire
- Security class: Adult Male/Category C
- Population: 400 (February 2021)
- Opened: 1946
- Managed by: HM Prison Services
- Governor: David Redhouse
- Website: Huntercombe at justice.gov.uk

HM Prison Huntercombe is a Category C men's prison, located near Nuffield in Oxfordshire, England. It is operated by His Majesty's Prison Service.

== History ==
Huntercombe was built as an internment camp during World War II, and originally known as Camp 020R. It was a reserve camp for Camp 020 at Latchmere House in south London. Camp 020R was mainly used for long term detention, but Rudolf Hess was said to be held there briefly on his way south after he parachuted into Scotland in 1941. After the war the site opened as a prison in 1946. The site has seen renovation over the years so that very few wartime buildings remain today. Previously the prison had held adult males and was a Borstal to up to 1983, but in 2000 Huntercombe became a cellular prison for male juveniles aged 15 to 18.

An October 2002 report by His Majesty's Chief Inspector of Prisons heavily criticised Huntercombe for being severely overcrowded. The report described the prison as unsafe and recommended a large reduction in prisoners being held there.

In April 2007 a report from the Independent Monitoring Board stated that Huntercombe was failing in its central purpose to rehabilitate inmates. The report also criticised the fact that prisoners with serious mental health conditions were being sent to Huntercombe despite the fact that the prison did not have the facilities to treat them. However the report praised staff at Huntercombe and the prison's approach to race relations.

In June 2010, Huntercombe was decommissioned as a juvenile prison due to a national decrease in juvenile offender numbers. The prison was reopened in October 2010 as a Category C jail for up to 400 adult males. In February 2012 the Ministry of Justice announced a gradual transition to foreign national offenders only and the prison now holds a solely foreign-national population mainly awaiting deportation.

== Prison facilities ==
The prison's purpose-built sports complex comprises a sports hall with climbing wall, a cardiovascular fitness room, and an astroturf pitch. Huntercombe's chaplaincy comprises one full-time Chaplain, and access to a range of ministers representing different religions. Huntercombe has a visitors centre, located outside the main gate of the prison. The visits room has a small children's play area, toilets and nappy changing facilities. Refreshments are available through the WRVS canteen at weekends and vending machines during the week.

== Concern about lack of support for resettlement ==
In the 2017 and 2018 concerns were raised about a lack of support and resources for resettlement at HMP Huntercombe. In 2017 the Independent Monitoring Board (IMB) found the budget for resettlement at HMP Huntercombe was minimal and said the lack of support was a "major area of unfairness" between the way UK national prisoners and foreign prisoners are treated in the UK. Despite the fact that HMP Huntercombe tried to increase support for resettlement in 2018, the Ministry of Justice did not increase its overall budget for this area to be properly resourced.

== Notable prisoners ==
- Boris Becker
