= Nuffield Place =

Country house near Nuffield, Oxfordshire, England

Coordinates: 51.585050°N 1.021667°W

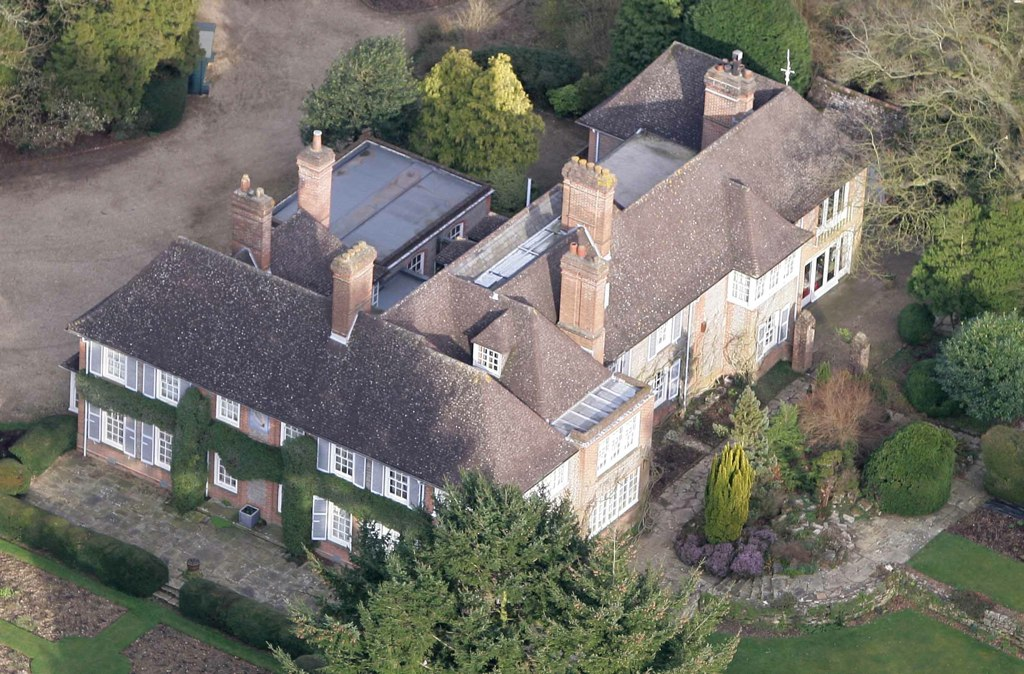
- Aerial view of Nuffield Place

- Location within Oxfordshire
- OS grid reference: SU6687
- Civil parish: Nuffield
- District: South Oxfordshire
- Shire county: Oxfordshire
- Region: South East
- Country: England
- Sovereign state: United Kingdom
- Post town: Henley-on-Thames
- Postcode district: RG9
- Dialling code: 01491
- Police: Thames Valley
- Fire: Oxfordshire
- Ambulance: South Central
- UK Parliament: Henley
- Website: www.nationaltrust.org.uk/ nuffield-place

Nuffield Place is a country house near the village of Nuffield in the Chiltern Hills in South Oxfordshire, England, just over 4 miles (6 km) east of Wallingford.

The house was completed in 1914. Sir William Morris (later created Viscount Nuffield) had it enlarged in 1933 and lived there until his death in 1963. Lord Nuffield was buried at Holy Trinity Parish Church in the village, and bequeathed Nuffield Place and its contents to Nuffield College, Oxford, as a museum. The college later gave the house and part of the estate to the National Trust.

Lord Nuffield was fond of clocks and his bedroom contains eight. His bedroom also has a miniature workshop, in a cupboard, containing a vice and metalworking tools, as well as a jar containing Lord Nuffield's own preserved appendix.

== See also ==
- Greys Court, a nearby National Trust property
- Museum of Oxford
