= Rotherfield Greys =

Village in Oxfordshire, England

Coordinates: 51.537°N 0.954°W

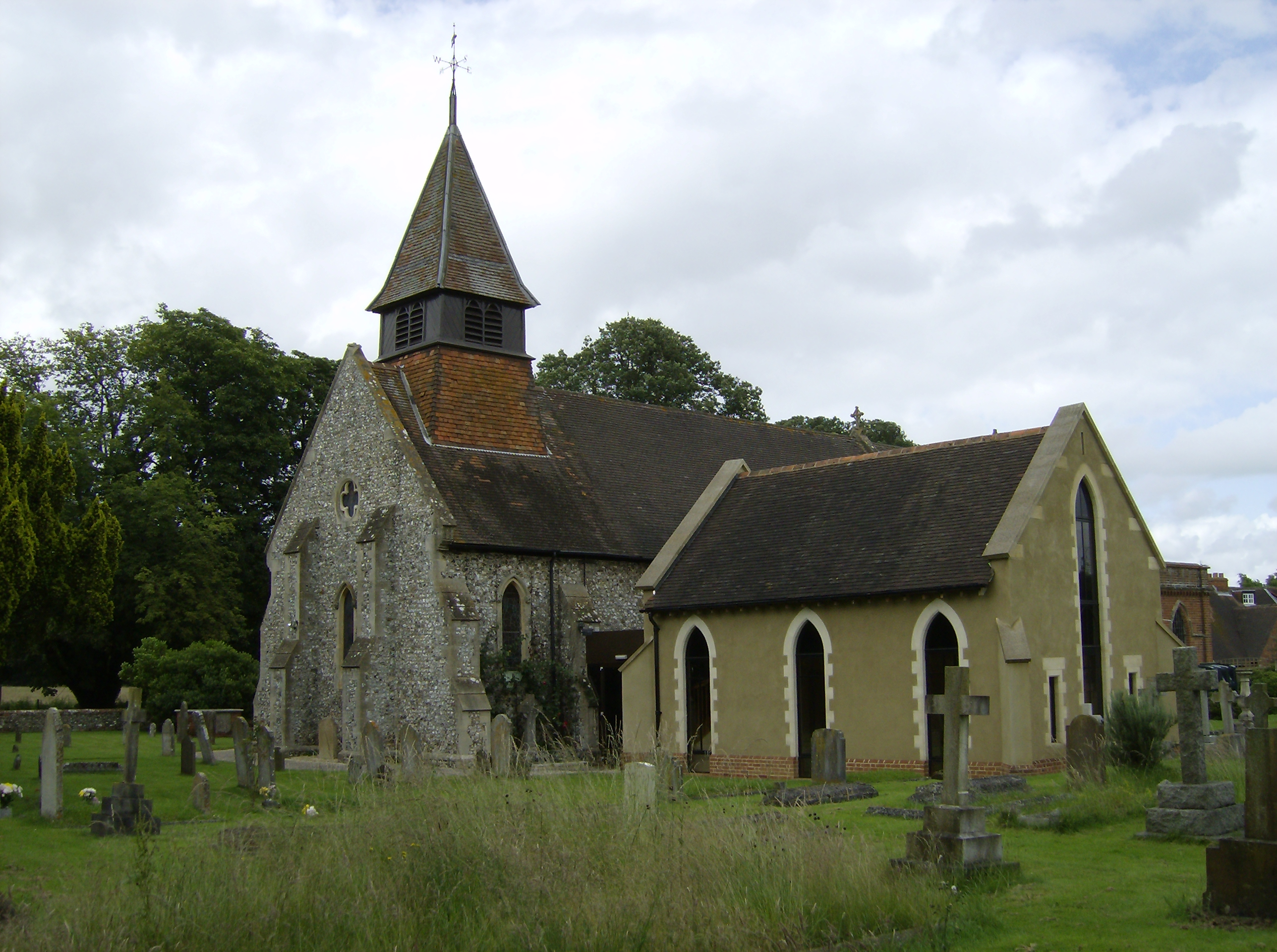
- St Nicholas' parish church

- Location within Oxfordshire
- Area: 7.73 km^{2} (2.98 sq mi)
- Population: 350 (2011 census)
  - Density: 45/km^{2} (120/sq mi)
- OS grid reference: SU725825
- Civil parish: Rotherfield Greys
- District: South Oxfordshire
- Shire county: Oxfordshire
- Region: South East
- Country: England
- Sovereign state: United Kingdom
- Post town: Henley-on-Thames
- Postcode district: RG9
- Dialling code: 01491
- Police: Thames Valley
- Fire: Oxfordshire
- Ambulance: South Central
- UK Parliament: Henley and Thame

Rotherfield Greys is a village and civil parish in the Chiltern Hills in South Oxfordshire. It is 2 miles (3 km) west of Henley-on-Thames and just over 1 mile (1.6 km) east of Rotherfield Peppard (locally known as Peppard). It is linked by a near-straight minor road to Henley.

== History ==
The Domesday Book of 1086 mentions Rotherfield Greys under the ownership of the Norman knight Anchetil de Greye, and in a period when the county was administered in hundreds, in Binfield Hundred. Rotherfield derives from the Old English redrefeld meaning "cattle lands". Around 1347, a castle was built at Rotherfield Greys; it is now in ruins. The parish church includes the 16th-century Knollys Chapel, which houses an ornate tomb of the Knollys family. This includes effigies of Sir Francis Knollys and his wife, who was lady-in-waiting to Queen Elizabeth I.

== Amenities ==
The Church of England parish church of Saint Nicholas is Norman and was restored in 1865. The village has a public house, The Maltsters Arms, which is owned by W.H. Brakspear & Sons. The current landlord is Gary Clarke. French-trained Chef & front man of The Cureheads.

== Architecture ==
In the parish is Greys Court, whose predecessor was the manor house of the Grey family. It is owned and maintained by the National Trust and its Dower House is likewise in the top category of Grade I listed building. As to other buildings, ruins, and monuments, 31 are listed in the parish for historic or architectural merit, most in the Grade II starting category.

== Gallery ==
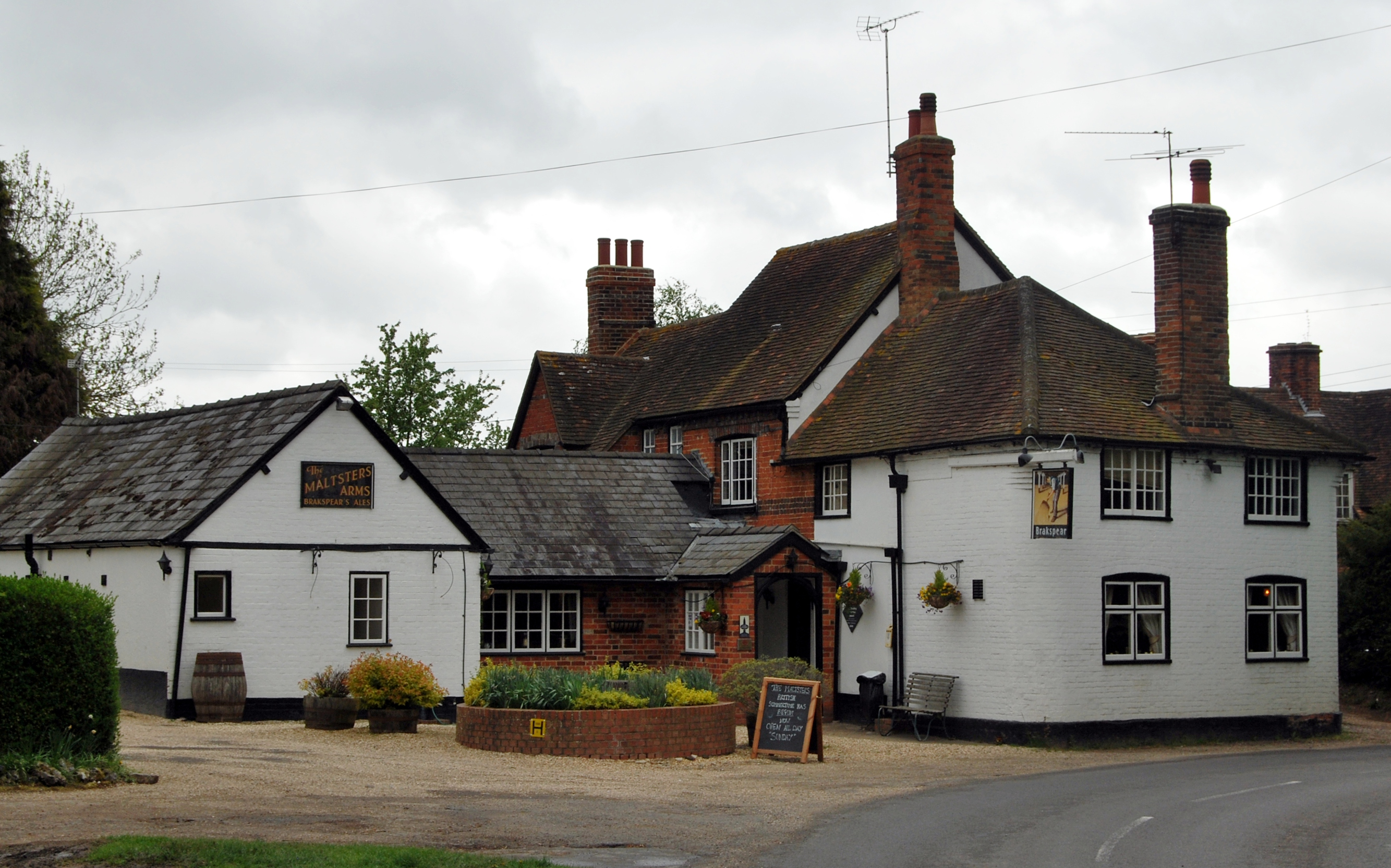
The Maltsters Arms

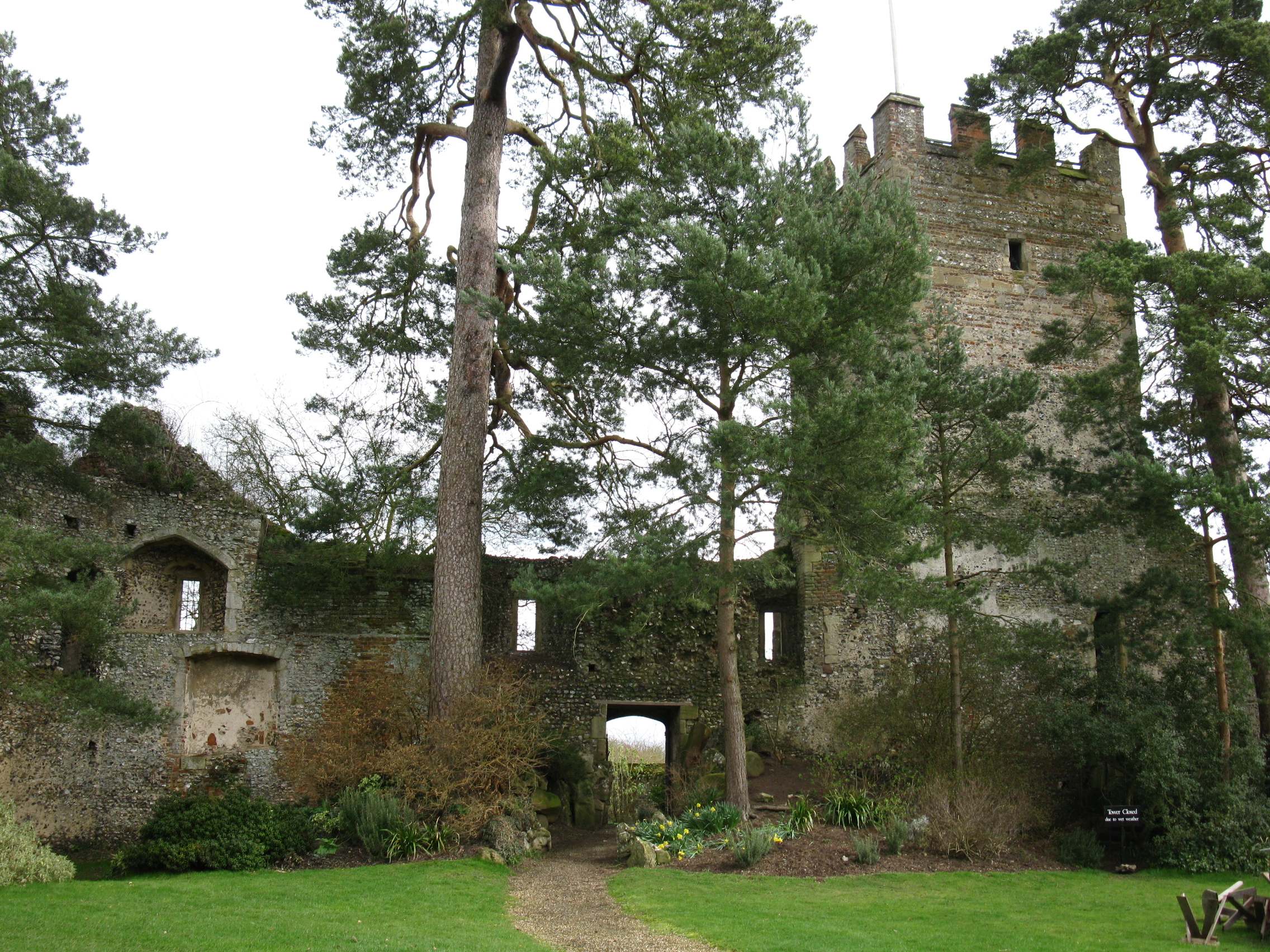
Ruins of Rotherfield Greys Castle

== Sources ==
- Sherwood, Jennifer; Pevsner, Nikolaus (1974). Oxfordshire. The Buildings of England. Harmondsworth: Penguin Books. pp. 734–737. ISBN 0-14-071045-0.
- Townley, Simon C, ed. (2011). A History of the County of Oxford, Volume 16: Binfield Hundred (Part One): Henley-on-Thames and Environs. Victoria County History. Woodbridge: Boydell and Brewer. ISBN 978-1-904356-38-7.
