= Nuffield, Oxfordshire =

Village in Oxfordshire, England

Coordinates: 51.582°N 1.036°W

Nuffield
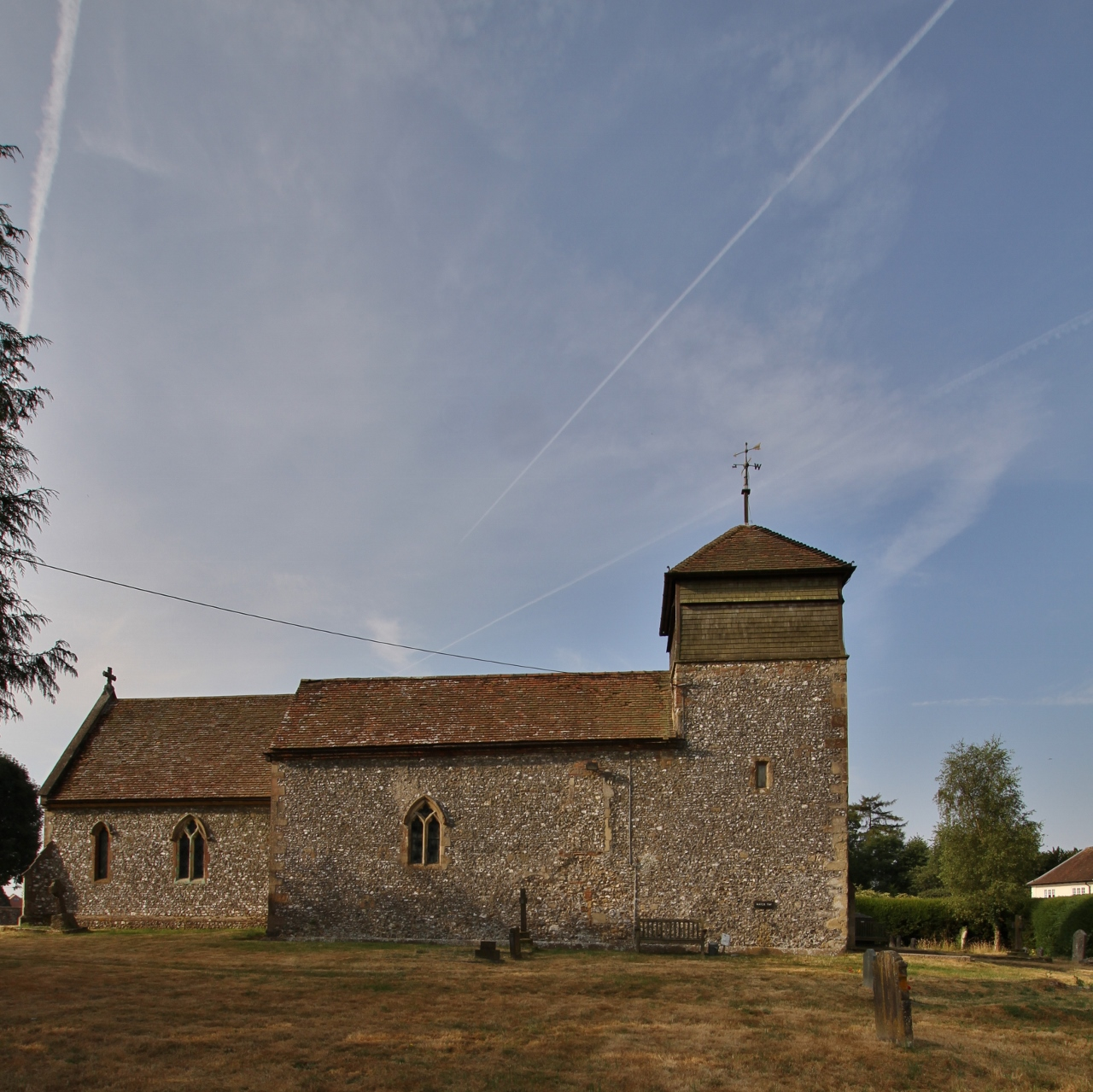
- Holy Trinity parish church, seen from the north

- Location within Oxfordshire
- Area: 12.91 km^{2} (4.98 sq mi)
- Population: 939 (2011 Census)
  - Density: 73/km^{2} (190/sq mi)
- OS grid reference: SU6687
- Civil parish: Nuffield
- District: South Oxfordshire
- Shire county: Oxfordshire
- Region: South East
- Country: England
- Sovereign state: United Kingdom
- Post town: Henley-on-Thames
- Postcode district: RG9
- Dialling code: 01491
- Police: Thames Valley
- Fire: Oxfordshire
- Ambulance: South Central
- UK Parliament: Henley and Thame
- Website: Nuffield Parish Council

Nuffield is a village and civil parish in the Chiltern Hills in South Oxfordshire, England, just over 4 miles (6 km) east of Wallingford. The 2011 Census recorded the parish population as 939.

== Early history ==
The ancient Ridgeway path runs through the village. The section of the Ridgeway west of the village follows the ancient Grim's Ditch, which is a Scheduled Ancient Monument. The earliest known records that refer to Nuffield by name are from the early decades of the 13th century, when episcopal registers variously record the toponym as Togfelde, Toufeld or Tofelde. The ecclesiastical valuation prepared in 1254 by Walter Suffield, Bishop of Norwich for Pope Innocent IV records it as Todfeld. A feudal aid prepared in 1428 records it as Tuffeld. At a later date the first letter changed from T to N to create the modern form of the name. The name comes from Old English, possibly hōh-feld meaning "field by a spur of hill".

== Parish church ==
The oldest parts of the Church of England parish church of the Holy Trinity are Norman. They include the baptismal font and some of the masonry in the south wall of the nave. Around the bowl of the font is a Latin inscription in Lombardic capitals. In the 14th century the church was rebuilt and the north aisle was added. In the 15th century a ceiling with moulded wooden beams and carved wooden bosses was inserted in the nave. In 1845 the chancel was restored and the Gothic tracery in all the windows was replaced, to designs by Gothic Revival architect Benjamin Ferrey. The church is a Grade II* listed building.

== Economic and social history ==
The road between Henley-on-Thames and Wallingford passes through the parish just north of Nuffield. It was made into a turnpike in 1736 and ceased to be a turnpike in 1873. It is now classified as the A4130. Huntercombe Place is an Edwardian Tudor-style house designed by Oswald Milne, a former assistant to the Arts and Crafts Movement architect Edwin Lutyens and completed in 1910. The grounds of Huntercombe Place were used as an internment camp and are now part of HMYOI Huntercombe, while the house is a nursing home.

Nuffield Place is a country house, also designed by Oswald Milne, that was completed in 1914. Lord Nuffield had it enlarged in 1933 and lived there until his death in 1963. He was buried at the parish church, and bequeathed Nuffield Place and its contents to Nuffield College, Oxford as a museum. The college has in turn given the house and part of the estate to the National Trust. There was a 17th-century pub in the parish, The Crown, on the A4130 main road at Nuffield Common. By September 2016 it had ceased trading and its freehold was for sale. As of 2026, it had been restored as a craft centre.

== Amenities ==
Huntercombe Golf Club, established in 1901, is in the parish. The Ridgeway is now a long-distance footpath. Another long-distance footpath, the Chiltern Way, passes through the northern part of the parish. Thames Travel bus route 33/33A links Nuffield with Wallingford and Abingdon-on-Thames in one direction and Henley in the other. It stops on the A4130 main road between Nuffield Place and The Crown former pub. Buses run generally hourly.

== Gallery ==
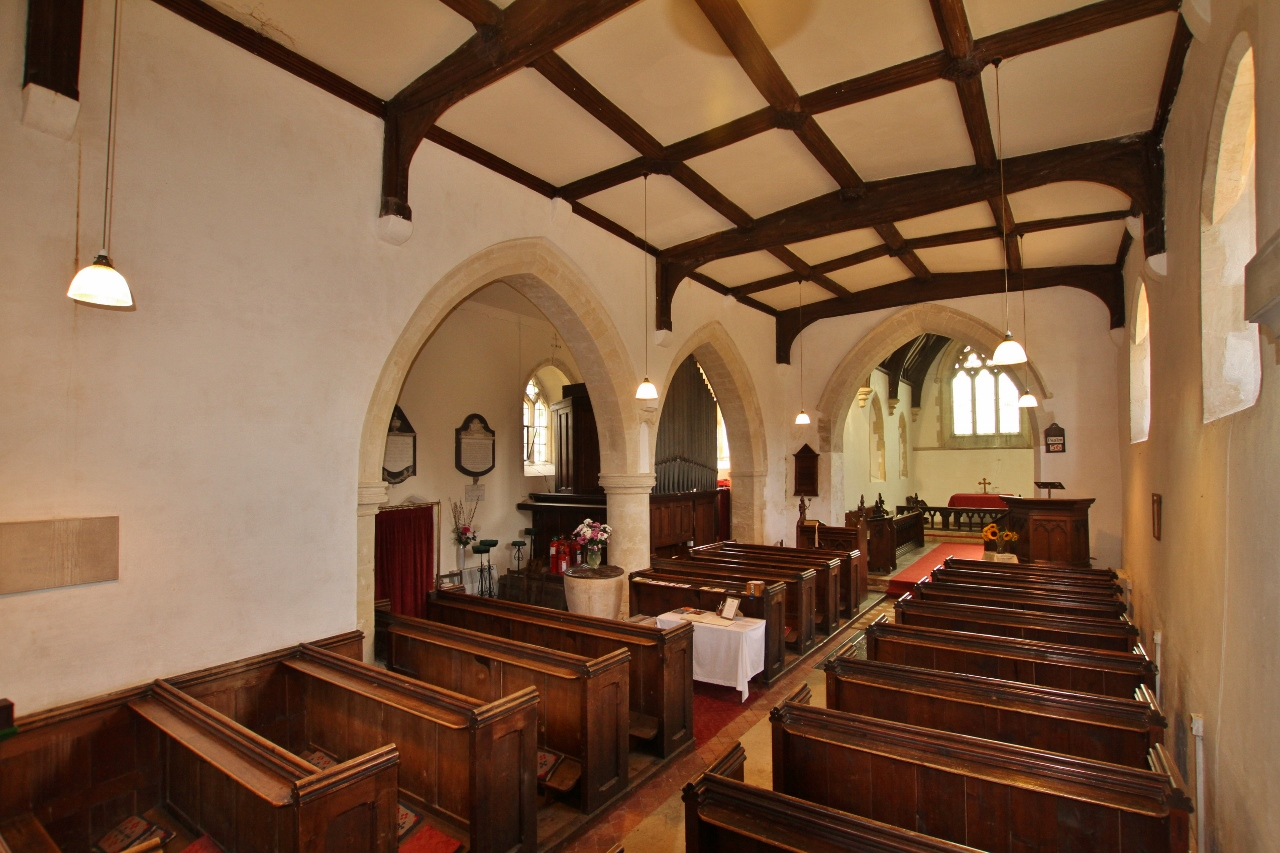
Inside the nave of Holy Trinity parish church, looking east to the chancel (right) and north arcade (centre)

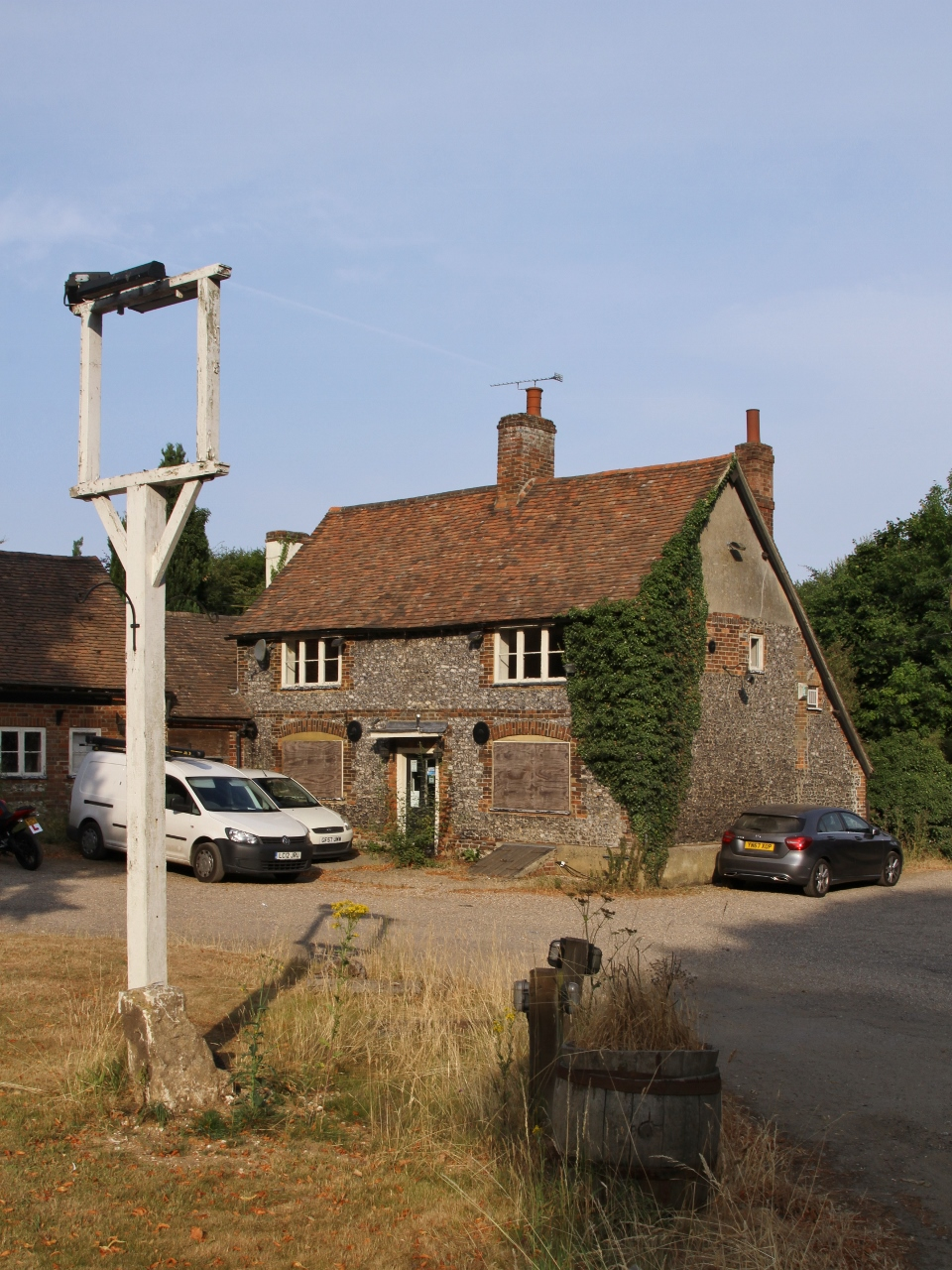
The former Crown pub on Gangsdown Hill, pictured before being reopened as a café and makerspace.

== Sources ==
- Ekwall, Eilert (1960) [1936]. Concise Oxford Dictionary of English Place-Names (4th ed.). Oxford: Oxford University Press. Nuffield. ISBN 0198691033.
- Sherwood, Jennifer; Pevsner, Nikolaus (1974). Oxfordshire. The Buildings of England. Harmondsworth: Penguin Books. p. 724. ISBN 0-14-071045-0.
