= Greys Court =

Tudor country house and gardens near Henley-on-Thames, Oxfordshire, England

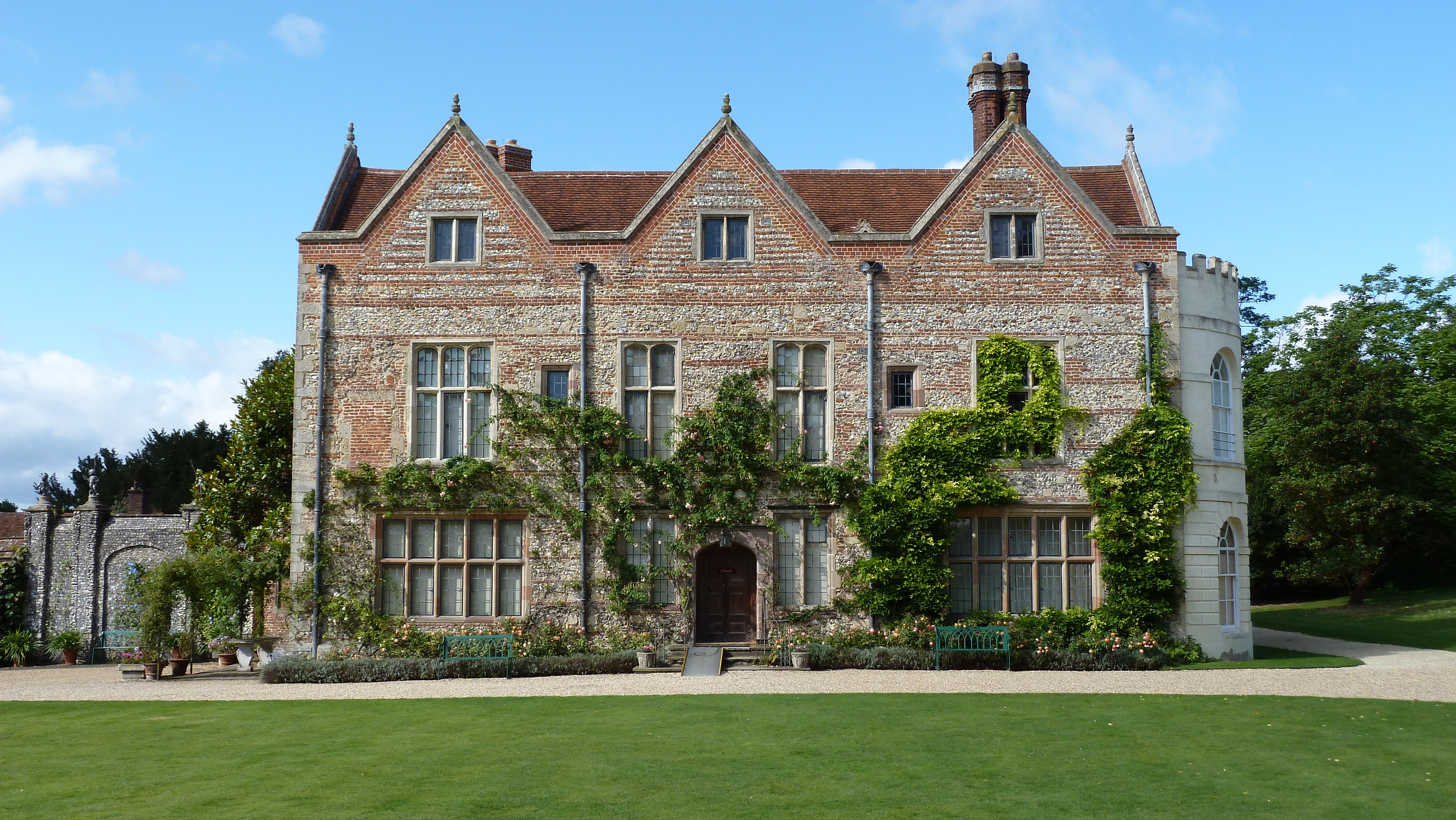
- Greys Court, the East façade

- Location within Oxfordshire

General information
- Architectural style: Tudor
- Location: Rotherfield Greys, Oxfordshire, England
- Coordinates: 51.54485°N 0.95591°W
- Construction started: 1642; 384 years ago
- Owner: National Trust

Technical details
- Grounds: 280 acres (110 ha)

Listed Building – Grade I
- Official name: Greys Court
- Designated: 24 October 1951
- Reference no.: 1181202

National Register of Historic Parks and Gardens
- Official name: Greys Court
- Designated: 1 June 1984
- Reference no.: 1001096

Greys Court is a Tudor country house and gardens in the southern Chiltern Hills at Rotherfield Greys, near Henley-on-Thames in the county of Oxfordshire, England. Now owned by the National Trust, it is located at grid reference SU725834, and is open to the public.

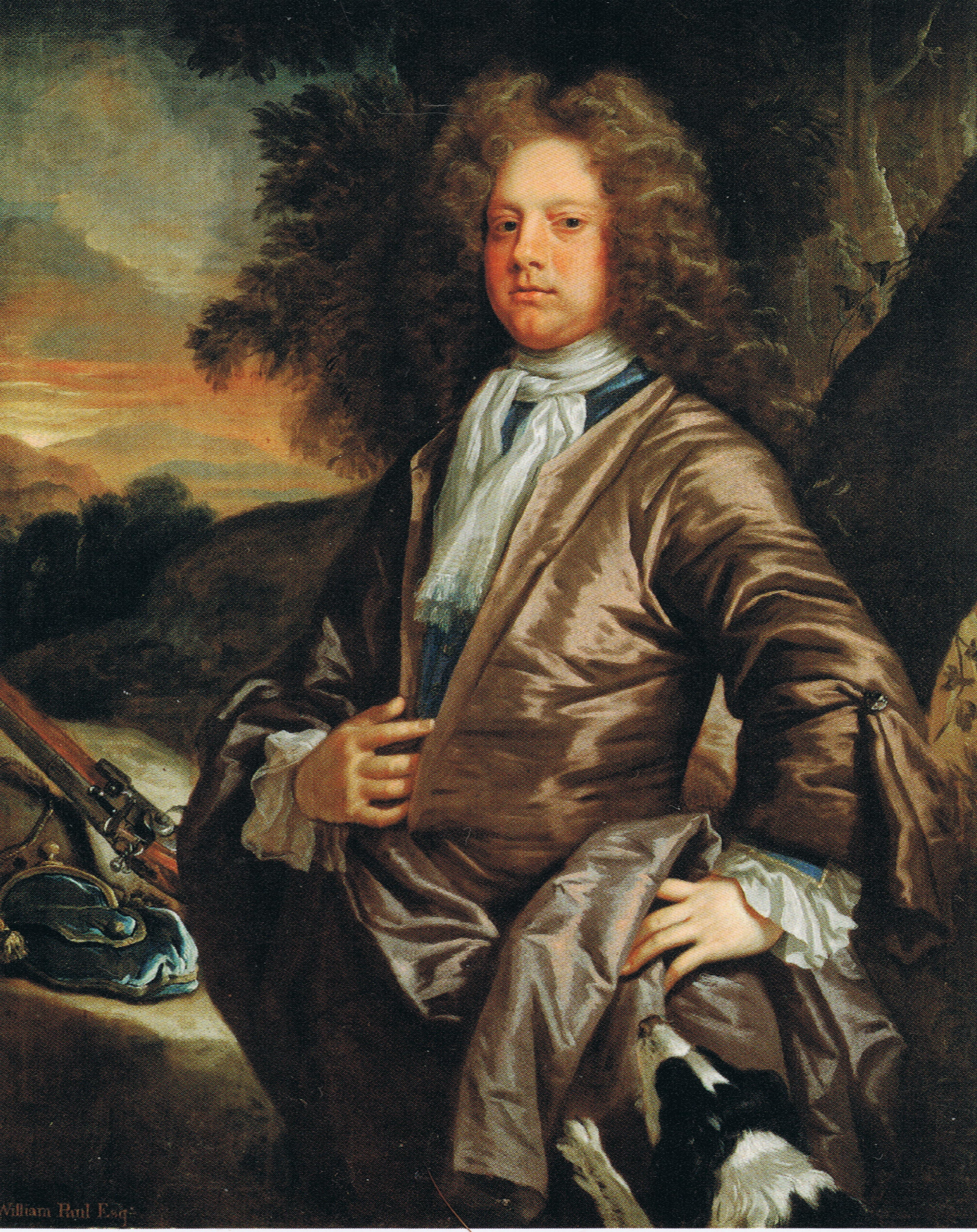
William Paul, Esq. of Bray (1673–1711), by John Closterman; his father James Paul bought Greys in 1688.

== Overview ==
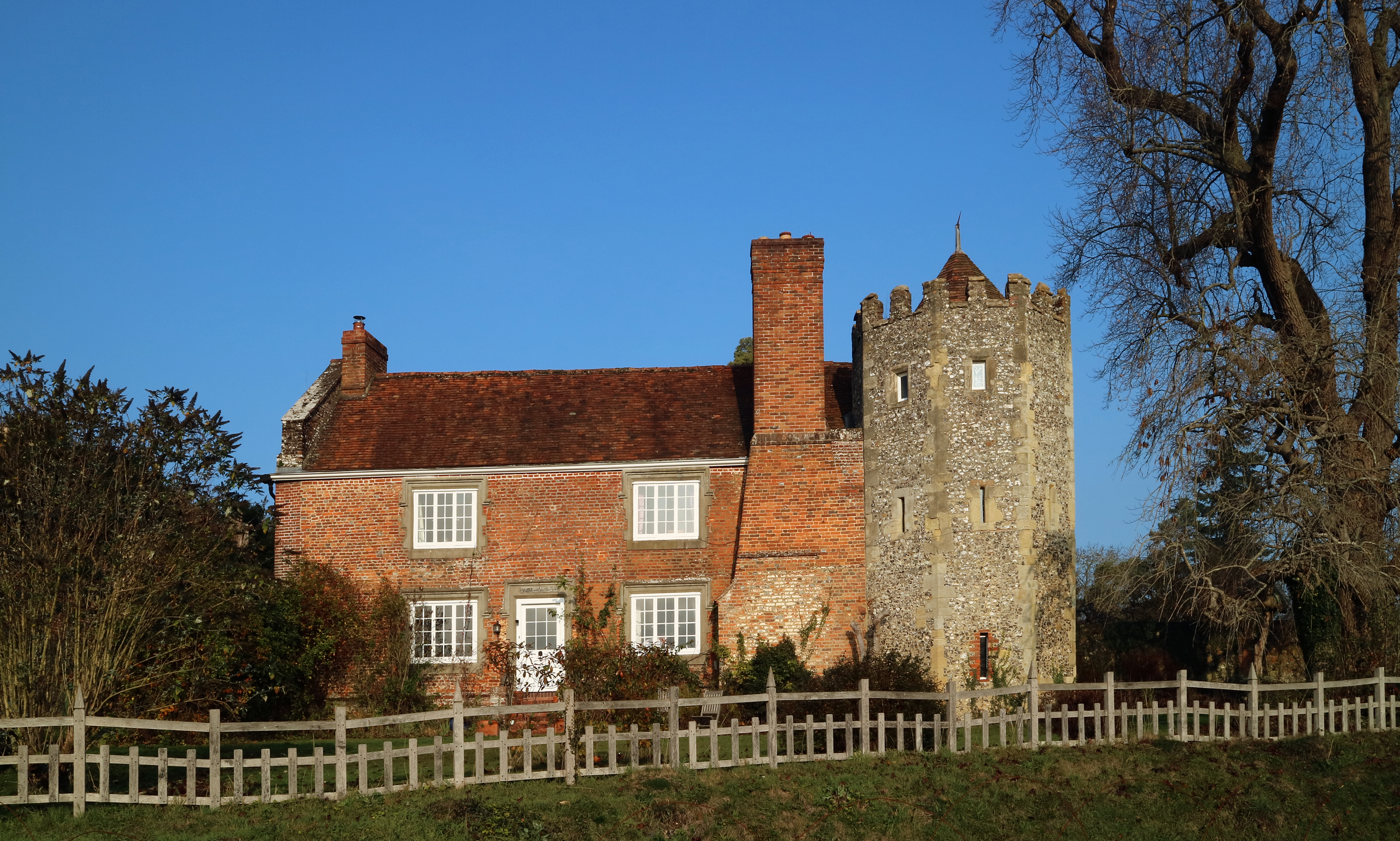
The Dower House at Greys Court

As Redrefield it was the principal manor of the six manors held in 1086 (as listed in the Domesday Book) by the Norman knight Anchetil de Greye (c.1052- post-1086), ancestor of the prominent Grey family.

The mainly Tudor-style house has a courtyard and gardens. The walled gardens contain old-fashioned roses and wisteria, an ornamental vegetable garden, maze (laid to grass with brick paths, dedicated by Archbishop Robert Runcie on 12 October 1981) and ice house. Within its grounds are the fortified tower built circa 1347, the only remains of the medieval castle, overlooking the gardens and surrounding countryside, as well as a Tudor wheelhouse.

The house remains furnished as a family home, with some outstanding 18th-century plasterwork interiors. It is a Grade I listed building.

== History ==
John de Grey, 1st Baron Grey de Rotherfield, one of the original founder Knights of the Garter, was granted a license to crenellate his Rotherfield house in 1346, when he also considerably enlarged the group of buildings and added a castle around 1347. The estate passed to the Crown in 1485 and was granted to Robert Knollys in 1514 for an annual rental of a red rose, remaining in the Knollys family until 1642, during which time the current house and its associated buildings were constructed.

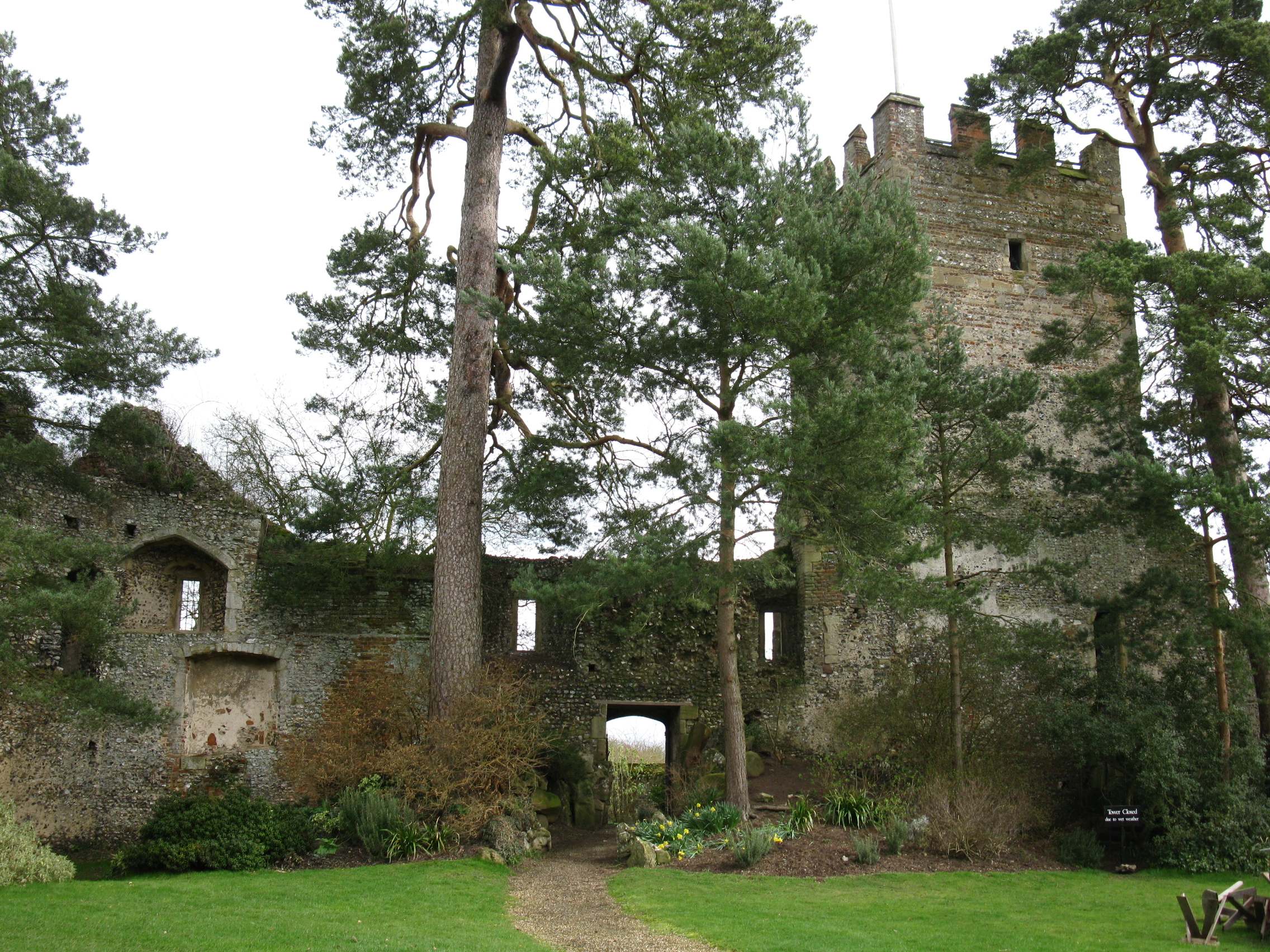
Rotherfield Greys Castle, built around 1347

Sir William Paul bought the house in 1686 and it passed via his son William's daughter's dowry to Sir William Stapleton, 4th Baronet in 1724.

Between 1935 and 1937 the house was occupied by Evelyn Fleming, mother of the author Ian Fleming.

In 1937 the house was bought from the Stapletons by Sir Felix Brunner and his wife Lady Brunner (née Elizabeth Irving), the granddaughter of the Victorian actor-manager Sir Henry Irving. In 1969 the family donated the property to the National Trust, where Lady Brunner continued to live until her death in 2003.

=== Filming location ===
The house has been used as a filming location for Downton Abbey, Agatha Christie's Poirot, and Midsomer Murders.

== See also ==
- House of Grey
- Castles in Great Britain and Ireland
- Nuffield Place, a nearby National Trust property
