= William Morris, 1st Viscount Nuffield =

English motor manufacturer and philanthropist (1877–1963)

The Right Honourable The Viscount Nuffield GBE CH FRS
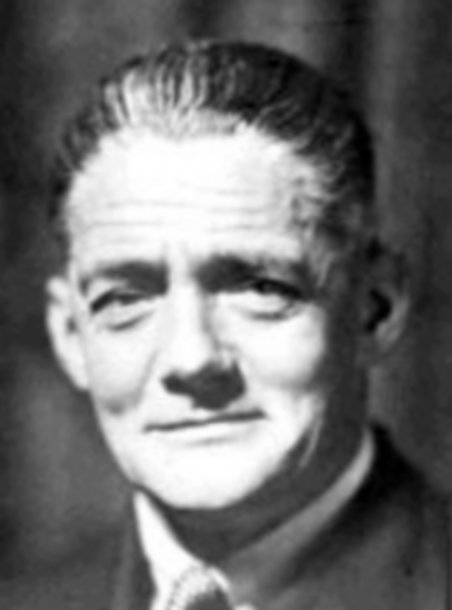
- Morris c. 1920
- Born: William Richard Morris; 10 October 1877; Worcester, Worcestershire, England
- Died: 22 August 1963 (aged 85); Nuffield, Oxfordshire, England
- Occupations: Motor manufacturer and philanthropist
- Known for: Founder of Morris Motors Limited; Nuffield Organization; Nuffield Foundation; Nuffield College, Oxford
- Spouse: Elizabeth Anstey (m. 1903)

William Richard Morris, 1st Viscount Nuffield (10 October 1877 – 22 August 1963), was an English motor manufacturer and philanthropist. He was the founder of Morris Motors Limited and is remembered for establishing the Nuffield Foundation, the Nuffield Trust and Nuffield College, Oxford, as well as being involved in his role as president of Bupa in creating what is now Nuffield Health. He took his title from the village of Nuffield, Oxfordshire, where he lived.

Initially Morris Motors relied heavily on Oxford's local labour force, and William Morris became the largest employer in the city. However during the 1920s and 1930s, Oxford saw a dramatic size and population increase following large numbers of unemployed people from depressed areas of Britain seeking work in Morris's factories. This time period was marked with frequent attempts of industrial action protesting against the low pay and poor working conditions in Morris's factories. The first successful strike in a Morris factory was achieved in 1934, led by Communist Party activist Abe Lazarus with support from local Labour Party activists.

William Morris was politically anti-union, antisemitic, and a key financier of Sir Oswald Mosley and British fascism. Morris gave Mosley £35,000 to fund the antisemitic newspaper Action, and £50,000 in 1930 to finance Mosley's fascist New Party, which was subsequently absorbed into the British Union of Fascists (BUF). Morris was also a subscriber to anti-Jewish publications, and his personal papers detailed his belief that the government of England was controlled by Jews. Despite Morris's personal political beliefs, the workers employed in his factories contributed to ushering a wave of left wing political activism across Oxford during the 1930s.

== Background ==
Morris was born in 1877 at 47 Comer Gardens, a terraced house in the Comer Gardens area of Worcester, England, about 2 miles (3 km) northwest of the centre of the city. He was the son of Frederick Morris and Emily Ann, daughter of Richard Pether. When he was three years old his family moved to 16 James Street, Oxford.

== Career ==
=== Before motor car manufacture ===
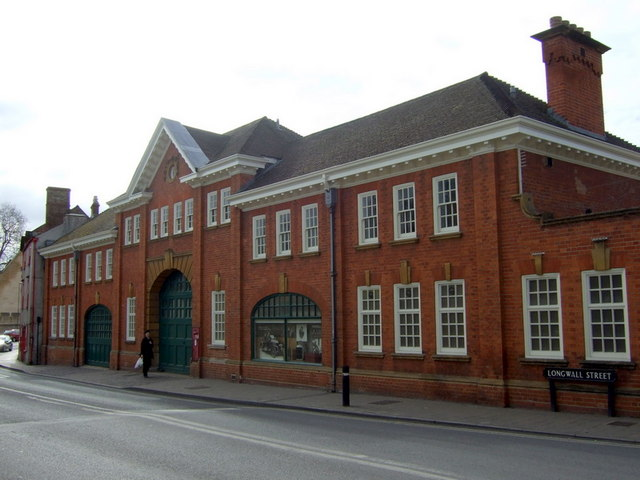
The Morris Garage Morris's 1910 building on his site in Longwall Street, Oxford

Upon leaving school at the age of 15, William Morris was apprenticed to a local bicycle-seller and repairer. Nine months later, after his employer refused him a pay increase, aged 16 he set up a business repairing bicycles in a shed at the back of his parents' house. This business being a success he opened a shop at 48 High Street and began to assemble as well as repair bicycles, labelling his product with a gilt cycle wheel and The Morris. Morris raced his own machines competing as far away as south London. He did not confine himself to one distance or time and at one point was champion of Oxford (City and County), Berkshire and Buckinghamshire for distances varying between one and fifty miles.

He began to work with motorcycles in 1901, designing the Morris Motor Cycle, and in 1902 acquired buildings in Longwall Street from which he repaired bicycles; operated a taxi service; and sold, repaired and hired-out cars. He held the agency for Arrol-Johnston, Belsize, Humber, Hupmobile, Singer, Standard and Wolseley cars. In 1910 he built new premises in Longwall Street, described by a local newspaper as The Oxford Motor Palace, changed his business's name from ‘The Oxford Garage’ to ‘The Morris Garage’ and still had to take more premises in Queen Street. The Longwall Street site was redeveloped in 1980, retaining the original frontage, and is now used as student accommodation by New College.

=== Motor car manufacturing 1920s ===
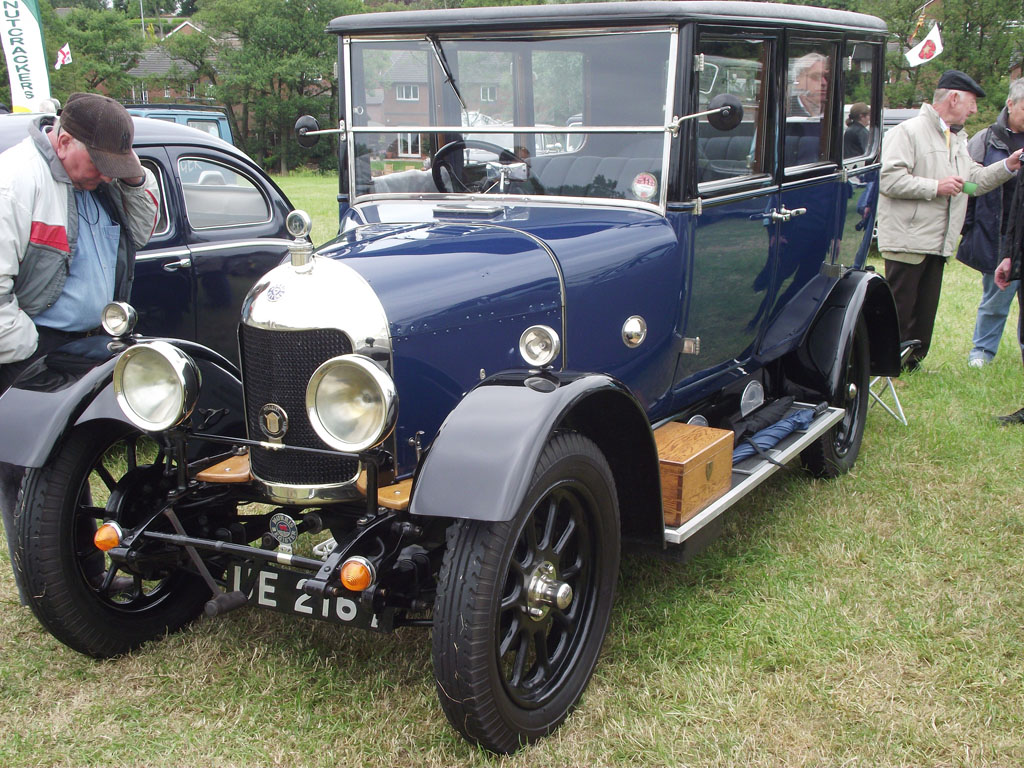
Morris "bullnose"

In 1912 he designed a car, the "bullnose" Morris, and, using bought-in components (including engines and axles from the USA), he began to build them at a disused military training college in Cowley, Oxford. The outbreak of World War I saw the nascent car factory largely given over to the production of munitions—including 50,000 minesinkers for the North Sea Minefield—but in 1919 car production revived rising from 400 cars in that year to 56,000 in 1925. Morris pioneered the introduction to the United Kingdom of Henry Ford's techniques of mass production. During the period 1919–1925 he built or purchased factories at Abingdon, Birmingham and Swindon to add to those in Oxford.

In February 1927, in competition against—amongst others—its creator, Herbert Austin, Morris paid £730,000 for the assets of the collapsed Wolseley Motors Limited which became his personal property. Wolseley were at this stage in fairly advanced development of an overhead camshaft 8 hp car, which he launched as the first Morris Minor in 1928. The original MG Midget, launched in 1929, was based on the Minor.

When major component suppliers had difficulties he purchased them on his own account. His American engines were now made under licence for him by Hotchkiss in Coventry. When in 1923 they were unwilling to expand production Morris bought their business and called it Morris Engines Limited. It would become Morris engines branch when he later sold it to Morris Motors. Again when back-axle manufacturer EG Wrigley and Company ran into financial difficulties he bought and reconstituted it as Morris Commercial Cars Limited to manufacture an expanded truck and bus offering. Following the same policy he bought the manufacturer of SU Carburettors in 1926.

Impressed by American all-steel bodies he persuaded Edward G Budd of Budd Corporation to enter a joint venture with him called Pressed Steel Company which erected their large factory at Cowley opposite Morris's own and with a connecting bridge in 1926. At that point the two business tycoons had each met their match. Eventually in 1930 the High Court ended their disagreements by obliging Morris to surrender his and his colleagues' membership of the Pressed Steel board and all Morris holdings and Morris lost all the capital he had invested in the venture.

=== Motor car manufacturing 1930s ===
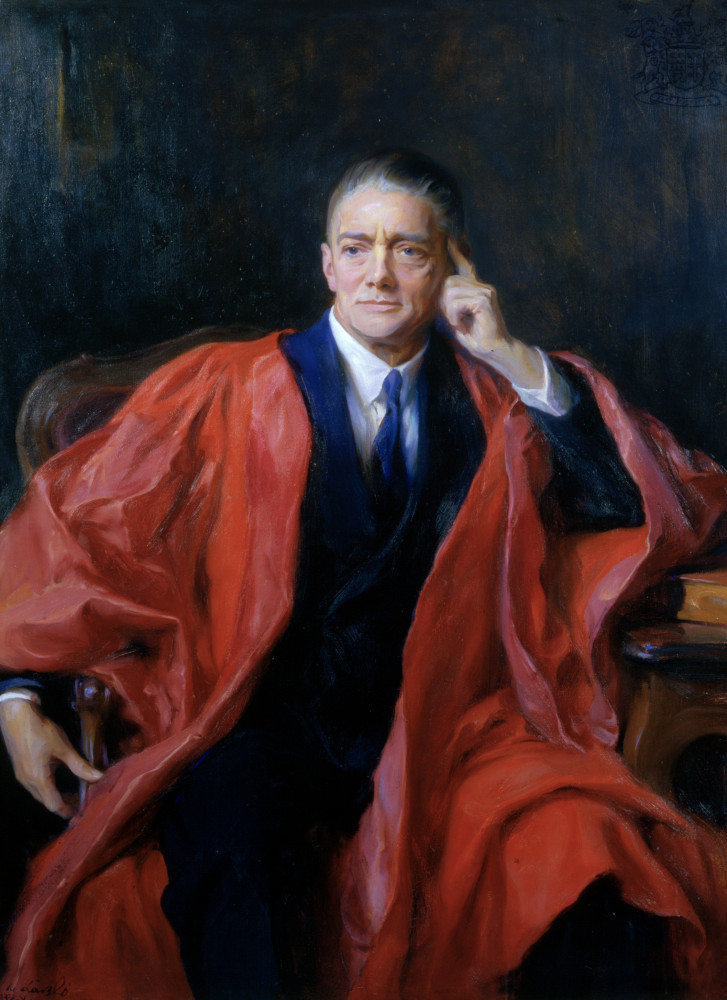
Portrait of Lord Nuffield by Philip de László, May 1937

Morris was "the most famous industrialist of his age". On New Year's Day 1938 he was further ennobled as Viscount Nuffield. In September 1938 he bought the bankrupt Riley (Coventry) and Autovia companies from the Riley family selling them to Morris Motors Limited. He had added another personal investment, Wolseley Motors Limited, to the portfolio of Morris Motors Limited in 1935. After he was ennobled as Baron Nuffield instead of the Morris Organization the whole gallery of all his personal enterprises were promoted as the Nuffield Organization. There was no legal substance to either of these groupings.

=== Factory strike of 1934 ===
In July 1934 a strike took place in a Morris' factory which historians have described as a "spontaneous walkout" of approximately 180 workers. William Morris was politically anti-union and had boasted that he would refuse to recognise any unions at his factory, stating "I never allow the trade unions to interfere with me." Although the workers had no specific demands, their reasons for walking out ranged from low wages to terrible working conditions. Upon hearing of the strike, the Communist Party of Great Britain sent the striking workers an experienced trades union activist and strike leader called Abraham Lazarus (aka Firestone Bill), who would later become a key political figure among Oxford's working classes. Before the strike there was very little trade union activity in Morris' factories.

On the 11th day of the strike the managers gave way and Morris' factories agreed to increase wages and to permit the establishment of trade unions within Morris' factories. Following this victory, all of the organisations which supported the strike benefitted from increased support. The Labour Party saw a resurgence in Oxford, the Transport and General Workers' Union saw an increase in members, and the Communist Party of Great Britain won the support of the majority of Morris factory workers. The success of the strike at Morris' also led to communist political beliefs gaining more widespread acceptance across Oxford.

=== World War II ===
The Supermarine Spitfire was a technically advanced aircraft. Though ordered by the Air Ministry in March 1936 by early 1938 no single plane had been made. Lord Nuffield had offered his own expertise, and that of his Morris Organization, to design and construct a vast new factory at Castle Bromwich, to his own ideas of industrial planning, claiming he would build four times as many planes there as any other factory in the country. Although the Treasury initially opposed the idea, having concerns about his control over the design of the project and its costs, the huge "Nuffield Project" was approved at a cost of £1.125 million by the Secretary of State for Air and Morris, now Lord Nuffield, placed in charge of it.

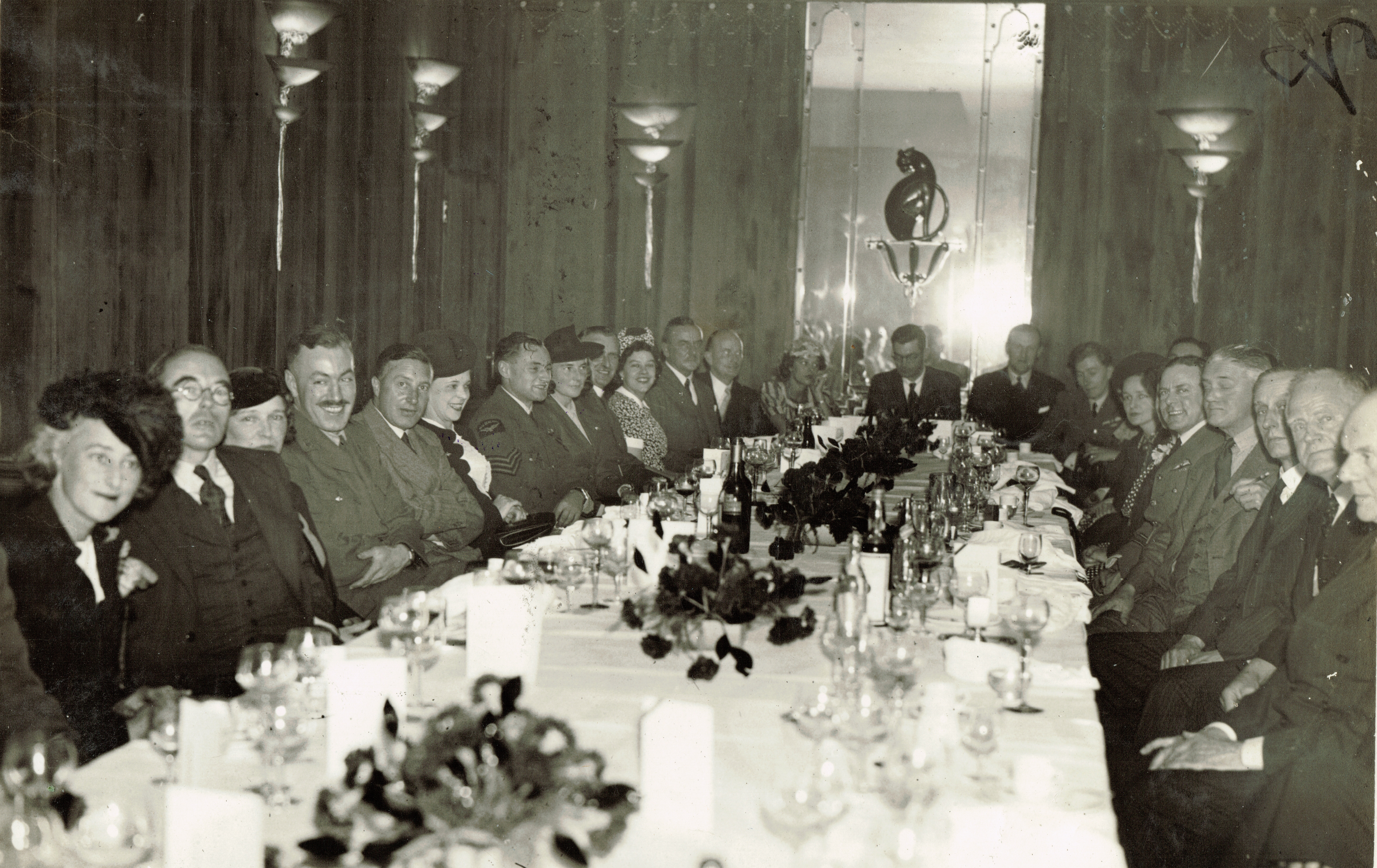
Luncheon honoring RNZAF Pilot Sgt. Jimmy Ward V.C. Savoy Hotel July 1941.

Within a year, with the factory still not built, the costs had increased to £4.15 million mainly due to constant changes in site layout and design. Nuffield had claimed he could produce 60 Spitfires a week but by May 1940, the height of the Battle of France, not one Spitfire had been built at Castle Bromwich. That month Lord Beaverbrook was placed in charge of all aircraft production, Nuffield was sacked and the plant handed over to Vickers, Supermarine's parent company. Vickers had inherited such a confused construction programme that even by 1942 building work was still going on and the project's accounts were not finally signed off by the Treasury until March 1944. As early as 1942, cracks in the brickwork of the principal building were discovered by Vickers, due to differential expansion of the various types of bricks used in the different stages of construction. Possibly as a result of this débâcle, in 1941 Nuffield invited Mrs Dorothée Martin to join his organisation to advise him on his war work.

=== Post-war ===
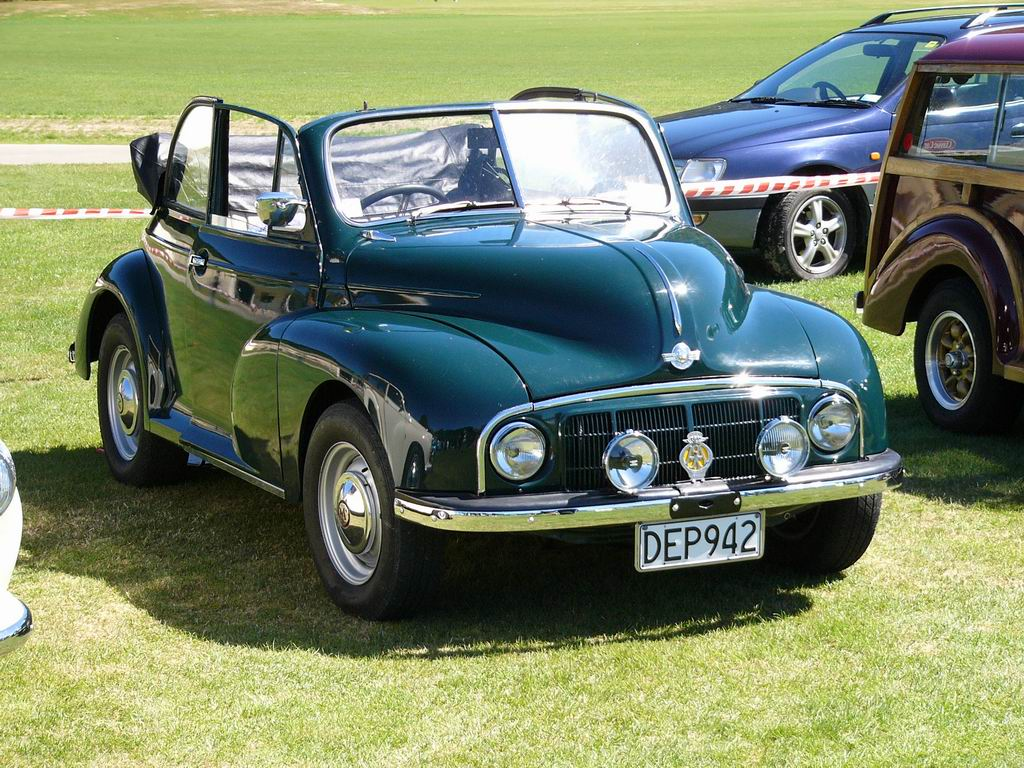
Morris Minor by Alec Issigonis

Morris Motors Limited merged with Austin Motor Company in 1952 in the new holding company, British Motor Corporation (BMC), of which Nuffield was chairman for its first year.

Viscount Nuffield retired as a director of BMC on 17 December 1952 at the age of 75, taking on the title of honorary president instead. Although succeeded as chairman by Leonard Lord, as honorary president he attended his office regularly and continued to advise his colleagues.

== Honours ==
- Morris was appointed an Officer of the Order of the British Empire (OBE) in 1918.
- He was created a baronet, of Nuffield in the County of Oxford, in 1929 and
- raised to the peerage as Baron Nuffield, of Nuffield in the County of Oxford, in 1934.
- In 1938 he was further honoured when he was made Viscount Nuffield, of Nuffield in the County of Oxford.
- He was also made

- a Fellow of the Royal Society in 1939,
- a Knight Grand Cross of the Order of the British Empire in 1941 and
- a Member of the Order of the Companions of Honour (CH) in 1958.

- He was appointed Honorary Colonel of 52nd (London) Heavy Anti-Aircraft Regiment, Royal Artillery on 4 June 1937 and continued that role with its postwar successor, 452 HAA Regiment.

Coat of arms of William Morris, 1st Viscount Nuffield
Crest A demi-bull Gules armed and unguled Or resting the sinister hoof on a winged wheel Gold. Escutcheon Ermine on a fess Or between in chief two roses Gules barbed and seeded Proper and in base a balance of the second three pears Sable. Supporters On either side a beaver Vert the tail -- Argent and Azure gorged with a collar pendent therefrom an escutcheon Or charged with three pears Sable. Motto Fiat Justitia (Let Justice Be Done)

== Personal life and philanthropy ==
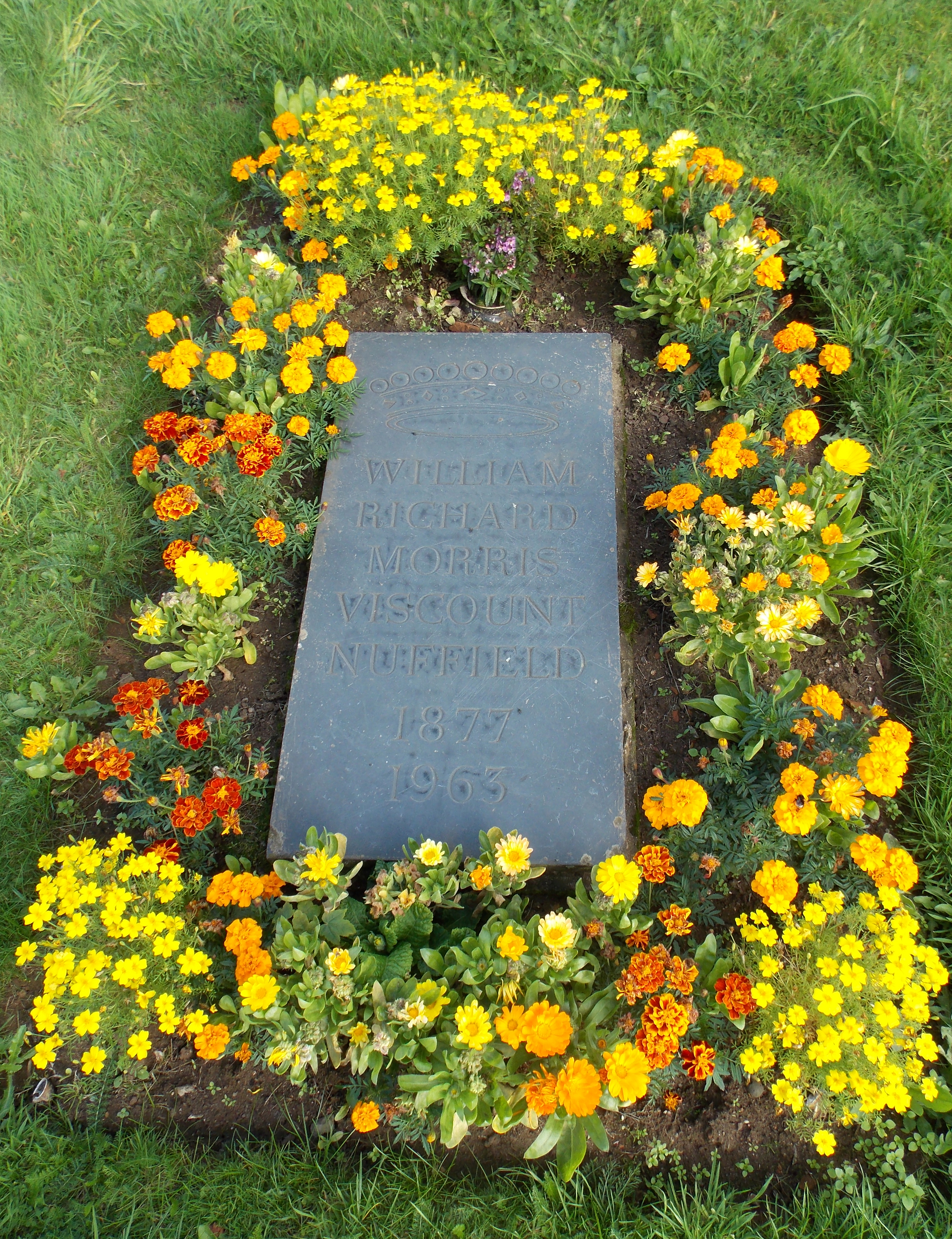
Grave slab of Lord Nuffield at Holy Trinity Church, Nuffield

Morris married Elizabeth Anstey on 9 April 1903. They had no children, and he disbursed a large part of his fortune to charitable causes.

He founded Nuffield College, Oxford, in 1937, a post-graduate college and the University's first co-educational college.

In 1937 he gave £50,000 to fund the expansion of the Sea Cadet Corps and donated £60,000 to the University of Birmingham for the Nuffield building, to house a cyclotron. In December 1938 he offered to give an iron lung (see Both respirator) made in his factory to any hospital in Britain and the Empire that requested one; over 1,700 were distributed. He also founded the Nuffield Foundation in 1943 with an endowment of £10 million in order to advance education and social welfare.

On his death the ownership of his former Oxfordshire home, Nuffield Place and its contents, passed to Nuffield College who opened it to the public on a limited basis. Although a sale had been mooted, it was passed to the National Trust and is open to the public on a regular basis.

He is also commemorated in the Morris Motors Museum at the Oxford Bus Museum. Morris also has a building named after him at Coventry University, at Guy's Hospital, London and a theatre at the University of Southampton. The Lady Nuffield Care Home in North Oxford is named after his wife.

His home in James Street now has a blue plaque. He died in August 1963, aged 85. The baronetcy and two peerages died with him as he was childless. He was cremated, and his ashes lie in Nuffield churchyard, beside his wife's.

=== Antisemitism and support for fascism ===
Historians have described William Morris as politically anti-union and antisemitic, often citing the fact that he was a key financer of Sir Oswald Mosley and British fascism. Between 1931 and 1932, Morris gave Mosley £35,000 to fund the antisemitic newspaper Action, and £50,000 in 1930 to finance Mosley's fascist New Party, which was subsequently absorbed into the British Union of Fascists (BUF). Mosley spoke highly of Morris, once regarding Morris as his 'chief backer' and praised Morris as "a good and honest man." Following the deteriorating reputation of the British Union of Fascists, Morris ceased giving any public support to British fascists after 1932. Despite ceasing to publicly support fascism, Morris retained his subscription to antisemitic newspapers for many more years. In 1934, Nuffield issued a public statement through The Jewish Chronicle repudiating fascism and antisemitism while also announcing a donation made to the Central British Fund for German Jewry in support of European Jewish refugees.

Historian of British fascism Dave Renton describes William Morris as "the most important example" of a wealthy supporter of Sir Oswald Mosley's fascist movement. Renton also describes Morris as being "fiercely anti-Semitic" in his private life, citing that for many years he was a subscriber to Alan Percy, 8th Duke of Northumberland's anti-Jewish newspaper The Patriot. According to Renton, William Morris's personal papers contain several anti-Semitic and pro-fascist comments, including one example which says: 'it is a well-known fact that every government in my England is Jew controlled regardless of the Party in power.'

Despite Morris's personal political beliefs, the workers employed in his factories that organised against their low pay and harsh working conditions would contribute to ushering a wave of left wing political activism across Oxford during the 1930s.

=== Attempted kidnap ===
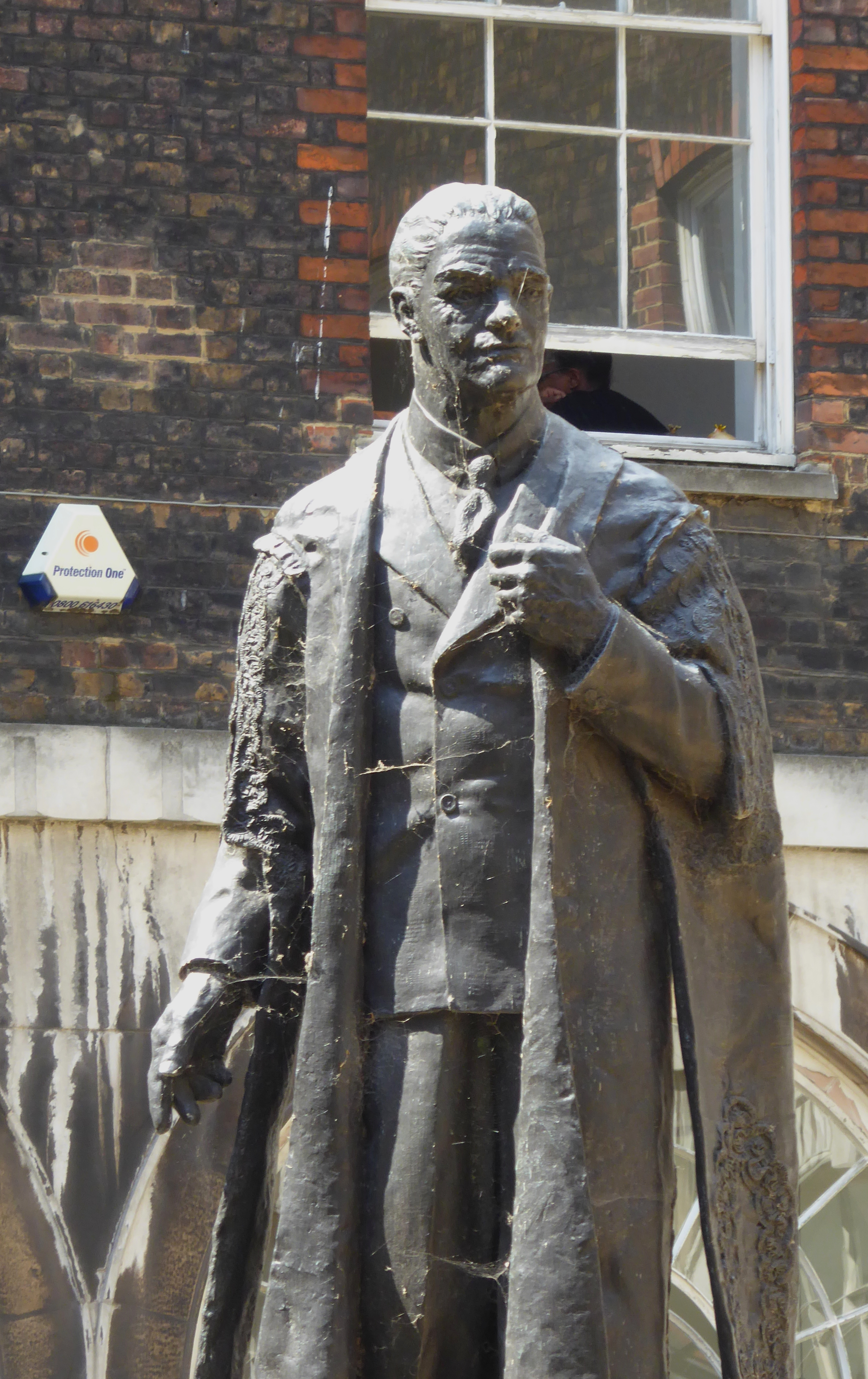
Statue of the Viscount in Guy's Hospital

In May 1938, a serial blackmailer, Patrick Tuellman, tried to kidnap Lord Nuffield for a £100,000 ransom. But Tuellman had an accomplice who betrayed his plan to Oxford City Police. The force briefed Nuffield and planned to catch Tuellman in the attempt. Nuffield took a keen interest in the preparations and insisted on attending every meeting.

On 28 May police ambushed Tuellman in Cowley in his car. Officers found him to be in possession of two automatic pistols, ammunition and items of disguise. Birmingham Assizes tried Tuellman and on 22 July convicted him. He served seven years' penal servitude.

== See also ==
- Nuffield College, Oxford
- Nuffield Trust
- Nuffield Place

== Sources ==
- Leasor, James (2008) [1954]. Wheels to Fortune – The Life and Times of William Morris, Viscount Nuffield. ISBN 978-1-908291-24-0. Archived from the original on 24 October 2020.
- Rose, Geoff (1979). A Pictorial History of the Oxford City Police. Oxford: Oxford Publishing Co. pp. 9–11. ISBN 0-86093-094-7.

Peerage of the United Kingdom
New creation	Viscount Nuffield; 1938–1963	Extinct
New creation	Baron Nuffield; 1934–1963	Extinct
Baronetage of the United Kingdom
New creation	Baronet (of Nuffield); 1929–1963	Extinct
