= Rotherfield Greys Castle =

English castle in Oxfordshire

- Oxfordshire, England
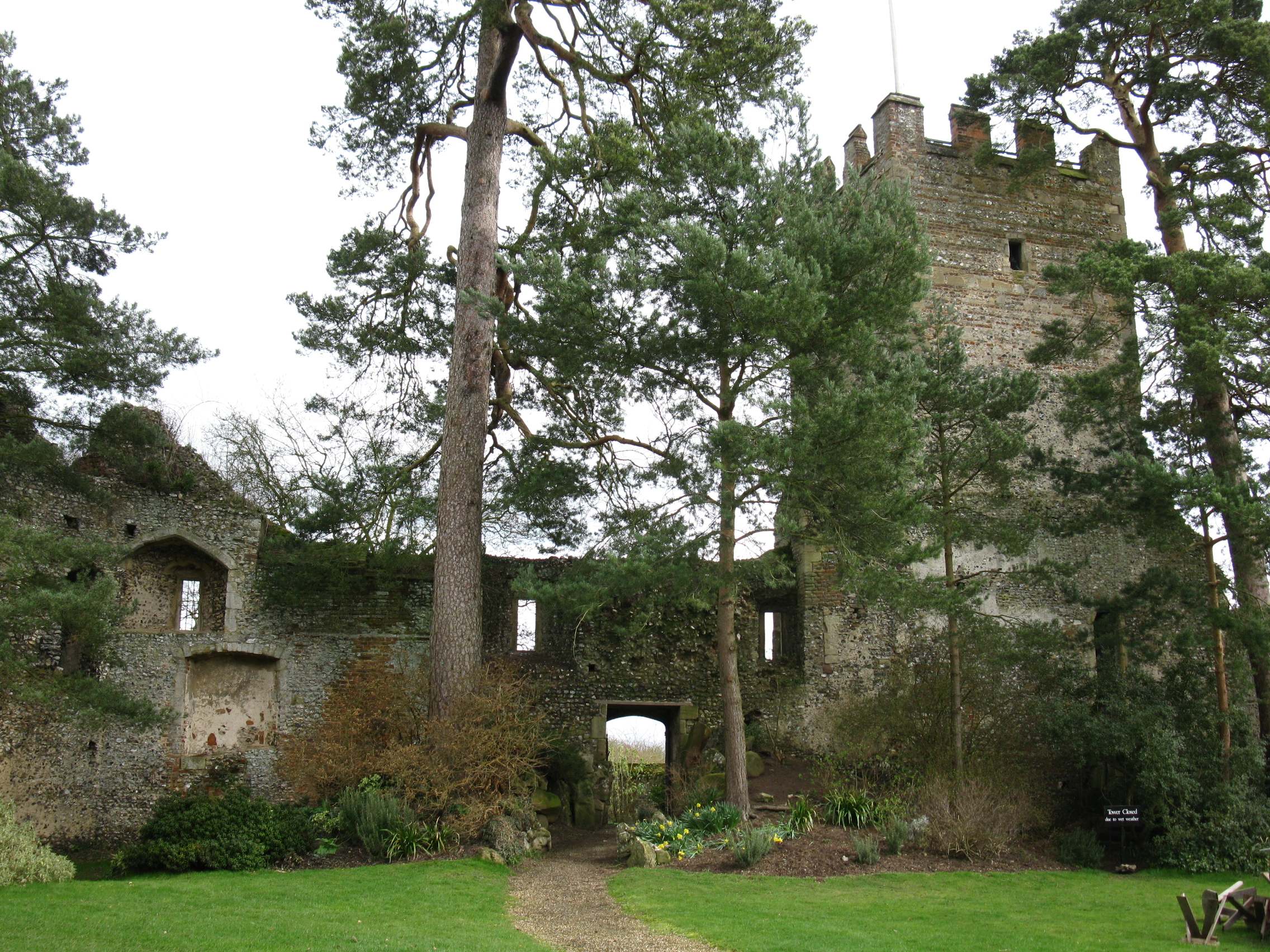
- Rotherfield Greys Castle in April 2010

Site information
- Type: Castle
- Open to the public: Yes
- Condition: Ruined

Location
- Shown within Oxfordshire.
- Coordinates: 51.5453°N 0.9542°W
- Grid reference: grid reference SO716927

Site history
- In use: c. 1347 – c. 1646
- Events: English Civil War

Rotherfield Greys Castle, initially known as Retherfield Castle, is a 14th-century fortified manor house built in Rotherfield Greys, Oxfordshire. Only the ruins of a single tower and a section of curtain wall survives, of which is associated with Greys Court, a Tudor country house. The castle is owned by the National Trust.

== History ==
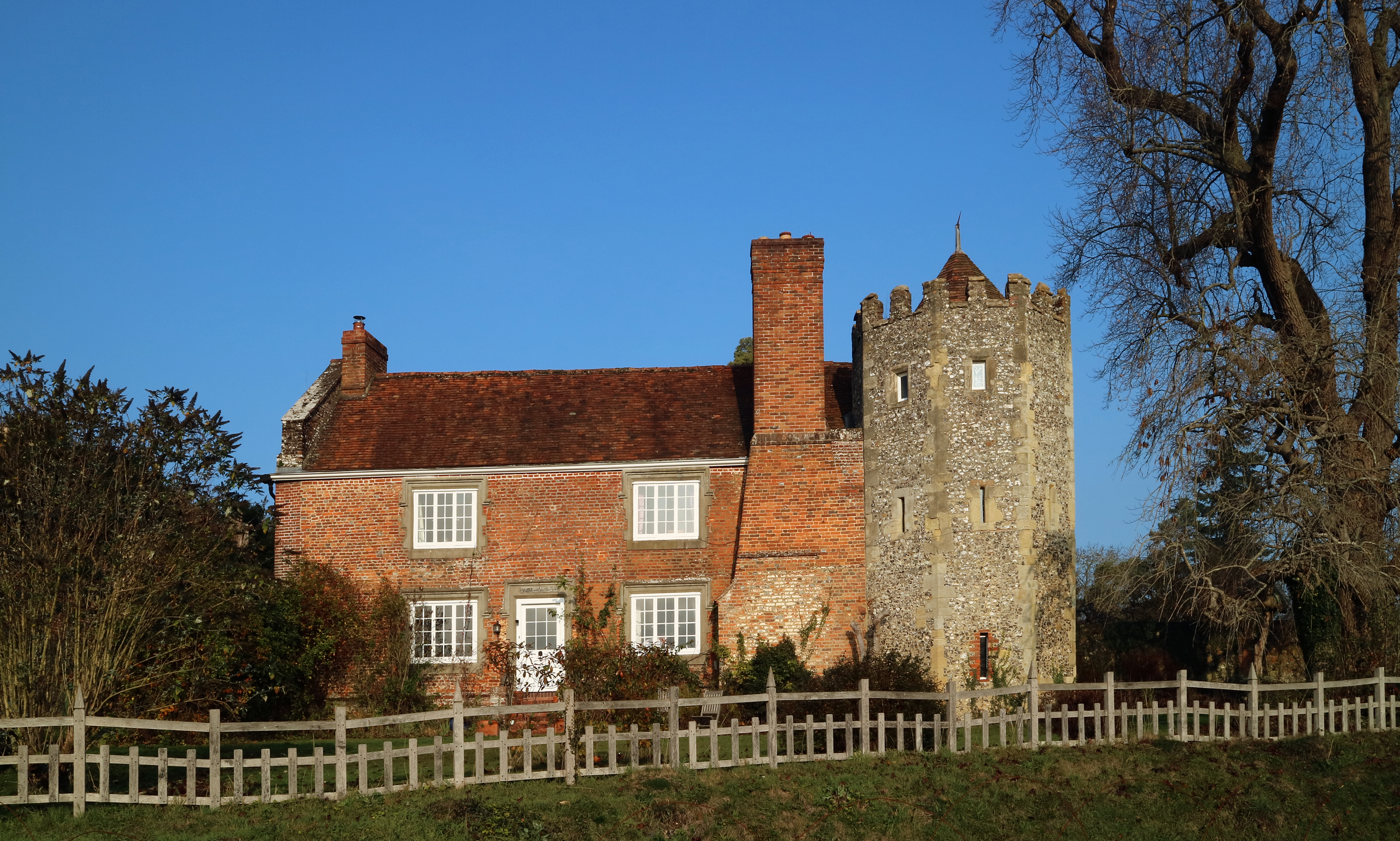
Part of Rotherfield Greys Castle survives attached to the right side of the dower house (pictured here)

The earliest mention of a manor at Rotherfield Greys, then known as Retherfield, was in 1283 during the reign of King Edward I. The current castle at Rotherfield Greys, which was probably not built for defensive purposes, replaced this manor and it was built circa 1347 after being crenelated by Johannes de Grey de Retherfeld on 10 December 1346. The east front, which was destroyed during the English Civil War, was extended around 1600 by William Knollys and the castle was slighted during the English Civil War; it has been in ruins since c. 1646.

It is a Grade I listed building, along with the rest of Greys Court. Of the surviving ruins, one tower is set obliquely at the north angle, the other tower is in the middle of the north eastern side and the third tower is octagonal and its south eastern corner has been incorporated into part of a cottage that likely dates to the early 17th century.
