= Stumpe =

Stumpe is a surname. Notable people with the surname include:

- Bent Stumpe, made first touch screen
- Isabel Stumpe
- William Stumpe (by 1498–1552), English politician and clothier
- James Stumpe, MP for Malmesbury (UK Parliament constituency)
- John Stumpe, MP for Malmesbury (UK Parliament constituency)
