= Thomas Vavasour (knight marshal) =

English nobleman and politician (1560–1620)

Sir Thomas Vavasour
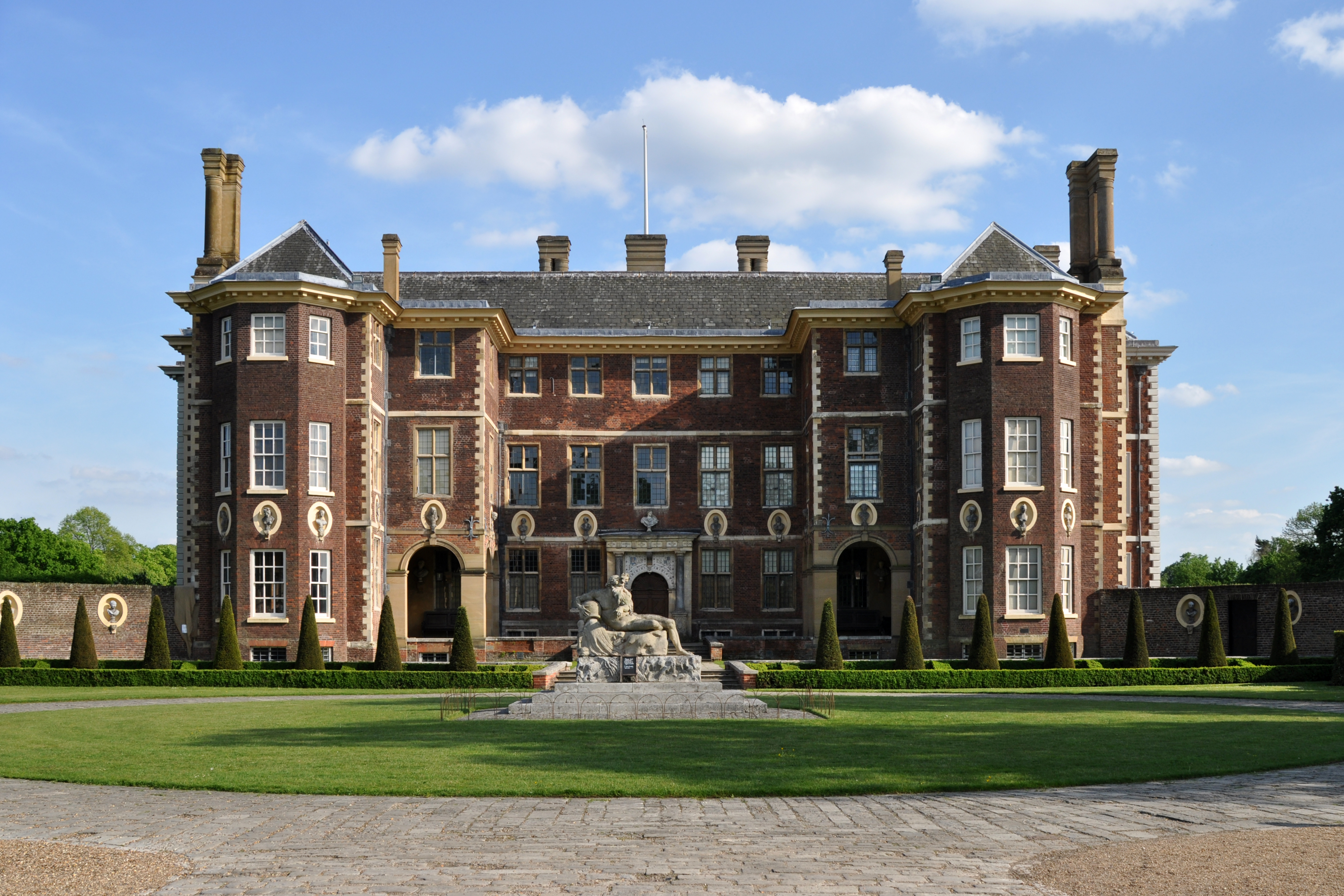
- Ham House, London

Member of Parliament for Wootton Bassett
- In office 1584–1586

Member of Parliament for Wootton Bassett
- In office 1586–1589

Member of Parliament for Malmesbury
- In office 1589–1589

Personal details
- Born: 1560 Yorkshire, England
- Died: 1620 (aged 59–60)
- Spouse: Mary Dodge
- Children: 4 sons, 2 daughters
- Education: Caius College, Cambridge
- Occupation: Knight Marshal

Military service
- Years of service: 1584–1591
- Rank: Captain
- Battles/wars: Arnhem 1585, Netherlands 1587

Thomas Vavasour (1560–1620) was an English soldier, courtier and Member of Parliament.

He came from a family long established in Yorkshire. His grandfather was William Vavasour and his father was Henry Vavasour (died 1584) of Copmanthorpe, Yorkshire. His mother, Margaret, was the daughter of Sir Henry Knyvet (died 1547) of Charlton, Wiltshire. Thomas was educated at Eton and Caius College, Cambridge, where he was a fellow commoner.

In 1576 he married Mary, daughter and heiress of John Dodge of Copes, Suffolk, widow of Peter Houghton, alderman of London. They had four sons and two daughters.

He became involved in court scandal and rivalry through the actions of his elder sister, Anne.

He was Member of Elizabethan Parliaments for Wootton Bassett in the 1584 and 1586 parliaments, and member for Malmesbury in the 1589 parliament.

In August 1585 he fought in the Netherlands as captain of foot from Yorkshire, retaining this command until 1591. He distinguished himself on two occasions, once in an attack on a sconce near Arnhem in October 1585, and again in 1587 with Lord Willoughby to fight the Marques del Guasto.

He is thought to have been knighted before August 1595, though the record is unclear.

Following military service he was a gentleman pensioner until the death of the Queen at Richmond Palace in March 1603. Following the accession of James I, Vavasour was made Butler of the port of London, earning him £1,000 compensation. In 1604 he was appointed Knight Marshal of the Household, a role confirmed to him for life in 1612 but, according to John Chamberlain, he sold the right for £3,000, in 1618, two years before his death.

He returned to parliament in 1609 to represent Boroughbridge after the death in office of Sir John Ferne and was re-elected in 1614 to represent Horsham.

In October 1618 he sold the office of Knight Marshall to Sir Edward Zouch for £3000.

Vavasour's wealth and connection to the court allowed the construction of Ham House in 1610 on land belonging to the Crown. After his death in 1620 the lease passed to John Ramsay, 1st Earl of Holderness, a favourite of the King.

Parliament of England
| Preceded by Henry Knyvet; Edmund Dunch | Member of Parliament for Wootton Bassett; 1584–1589; With: John Hungerford | Succeeded by Sir Henry Knyvet; John Hungerford |
| Preceded by Sir Henry Knyvet; Henry Bayly | Member of Parliament for Malmesbury; 1589; With: Henry Bayly | Succeeded by Sir Henry Knyvet; Thomas Lake |
| Preceded by Sir John Ferne; Henry Jenkins | Member of Parliament for Boroughbridge; 1609–1614; With: Henry Jenkins | Succeeded by Sir Ferdinando Fairfax; George Marshall |
| Preceded by John Doddridge; Sir Michael Hicks | Member of Parliament for Horsham; 1614; With: John Middleton | Succeeded by Thomas Cornwallis; John Middleton |
