= John Randolph =

John Randolph is the name of:

- John Randolph, 3rd Earl of Moray (1306–1346), 3rd Earl of Moray, regent of Scotland
- John Randolph (politician) (1693–1737), Virginia colonial politician, Speaker of the Virginia House of Burgesses
- John Randolph (loyalist) (1727–1784), Virginia colonial leader, loyalist in the American Revolution
- John Randolph (Bishop of London) (1749–1813), British cleric, professor and diocesan bishop (of Oxford, then of Bangor, then of London)
- John Randolph (Bishop of Guildford) (1866–1936), British cleric, suffragan bishop and dean
- John Randolph of Roanoke (1773–1833), Virginia "Old Republican" politician and political theorist
- John Randolph (actor) (1915–2004), American actor
- John Randolph, better known by his deejay name Jay Smooth, founder of New York City's longest-running hip hop radio program
- Jack Webb (John Randolph Webb, 1920–1982), actor and star of Dragnet, who used John Randolph as a pseudonym
- John Randolf (MP), member of parliament for Malmesbury
- John Randolph (cricketer) (1821–1881), English cricketer and clergyman
- John B. Randolph (1918-1983), Wyoming, United States politician
- John Hampden Randolph (1813–1883), Mississippi and Louisiana plantation owner
