= Charles Miles =

Charles Miles may refer to:

- Charles Miles (general), Australian Army officer
- Charles Miles (cricketer, born 1850), New Zealand cricketer
- Charles Miles (cricketer, born 1854), English cricketer and British Army officer
- Charles Oswald Miles, Anglican priest
- C. Austin Miles, American writer of gospel songs
- Charles William Miles (1823–?), English politician
