= John Stowell (disambiguation) =

John Stowell is an American musician.

John Stowell may also refer to:

- John M. Stowell, Wisconsin politician
- John Stowell (MP) for Malmesbury (UK Parliament constituency)
