= William Chaloner (disambiguation) =

William Chaloner may refer to:

- William Chaloner (1650s, or 1665–1699), con artist
- William Gilbert Chaloner (1928–2016), British paleobotanist
- William Chaloner (MP) for Malmesbury (UK Parliament constituency)
- Sir William Chaloner, 1st Baronet (1587–1641) of the Chaloner baronets

== See also ==
- Chaloner (surname)
