= Hankerton =

Village in Wiltshire, England

Coordinates: 51.615°N 2.045°W

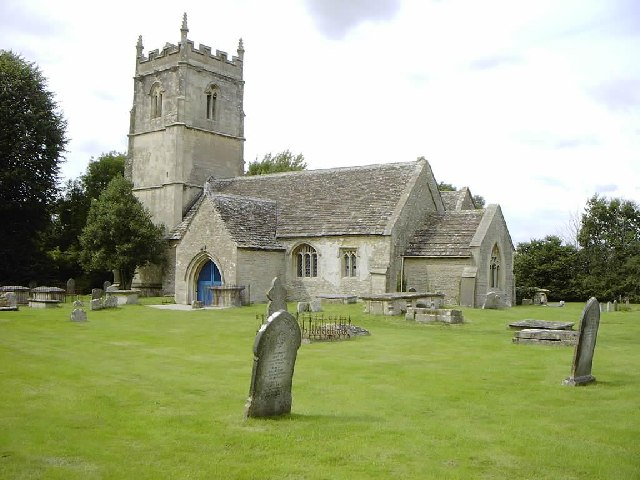
- Holy Cross church

- Location within Wiltshire
- Population: 280 (in 2011)
- OS grid reference: ST970907
- Unitary authority: Wiltshire
- Ceremonial county: Wiltshire
- Region: South West
- Country: England
- Sovereign state: United Kingdom
- Post town: Malmesbury
- Postcode district: SN16
- Dialling code: 01666
- Police: Wiltshire
- Fire: Dorset and Wiltshire
- Ambulance: South Western
- UK Parliament: South Cotswolds
- Website: Parish Council

Hankerton is a village and civil parish in Wiltshire, England, 3 miles (4.8 km) northeast of Malmesbury. The parish includes the hamlets of Cloatley, Cloatley End and Bullock's Horn.

Streams which form the Braydon Brook, which becomes the Swill Brook further downstream, flow east and north in the parish. Some of these streams form parts of the northern parish boundary. Cloatley Manor Farm Meadows, a biological Site of Special Scientific Interest, is within the parish.

== History ==
In 1377 Hankerton had 61 poll-tax payers and Cloatley 33, with a further 20 at Moredon, which was probably a hamlet within the parish. The population of the parish peaked in the 1830s or 1840s, with 417 recorded at the 1841 census, then declined to 252 in 1901 and has since remained near that level.

Until the Dissolution, Hankerton and Cloatley were probably part of the Crudwell estate which belonged to Malmesbury Abbey.

In 1553 Hankerton manor was bought by James Stumpe of Malmesbury and Bromham, who also owned Charlton manor. Hankerton and Charlton descended into the Howard family and the Earls of Suffolk, who continued to hold land in Hankerton in the 20th century. Cloatley manor was held separately, being bought in 1706 by Giles Earle of Eastcourt, Crudwell; his grandson divided the manor c. 1806.

Cloatley Manor Farmhouse has a 15th-century core and a wing of c. 1600, with additions in the 19th century. Until the early 17th century it was the seat of the Earle family, who moved to Eastcourt, Crudwell. The house and certain associated buildings are Grade II* listed.

The National Gazetteer of Great Britain and Ireland (1868) said of Hankerton:

HANKERTON, a parish in the hundred of Malmesbury, county Wilts, 4 miles N.E. of Malmesbury, its post town, and 4 W. of Minety railway station. It is a small straggling village, containing the tything of Cloatly. The living is a vicarage in the diocese of Gloucester and Bristol, value £269. The church, dedicated to the Holy Cross, is an ancient structure, with a tower containing four bells. The parochial charities produce about £3 per annum. There is a National school. The Earl of Suffolk is lord of the manor.

A small National School was built c. 1850-2 and was attended by 40-50 children in 1858. Owing to falling numbers, the school closed in 1922 but reopened in 1930; it was finally closed in 1966.

== Religious sites ==
The Church of England parish church is dedicated to the Holy Cross. The oldest parts of the building are the north arcade (late 12th century) and the north aisle (late 13th). The tower is from the 15th century; the chancel fell into disrepair, was demolished in the 16th century, and was not rebuilt until 1903 or 1904. The building was designated as Grade II* listed in 1959.

At first a chapel of Crudwell church, Hankerton gained a vicar by 1222, and a graveyard in 1445. The parish registers survive back to 1699. The tower has four bells, the oldest from c. 1399 and the others from the 16th and 17th centuries. The benefices of Hankerton and Charlton with Brokenborough were united in 1954; today the church is part of the Braydon Brook grouping.

A Strict Baptist chapel was built in 1837 on the lane east of the church, now known as Chapel Lane; it closed in 1971 and the building became a private house.
