= Lee Manor =

Lee Manor (also Leygh, 14th century; Lee, 16th century) is a manor house in the parish of Brading on the Isle of Wight.

== History ==
The manor lies just to the west of Sandown and as of 1912 was held with Landguard Manor by Mr. Arthur Atherley. It is first mentioned in 1332 and then belonged to John de Glamorgan. In 1580 it seems to have been divided up between John Worsley, John Knight and John Colman. It may have had its origin in the 'Alalei' of Domesday, held before and after the Conquest by Ulnod the thegn. Richard Knight in 1712 charged Lee Farm within his manor of Landguard with a charity.
