= John S. Tanner =

John S. Tanner may refer to:

- John Tanner (Tennessee politician) (John Sumners Tanner, born 1944), U.S. representative from Tennessee
- John Sigismund Tanner (1705–1775), engraver to the Royal Mint, born in Coburg
- John Sears Tanner (born 1950), president of Brigham Young University–Hawaii

== See also ==
- John Tanner (disambiguation)
