= Edward Poole (died 1578) =

English politician

Edward Poole (c. 1530 – 1578) was a Wiltshire landowner and MP.

He was the younger son of Henry Poole of Oaksey, Wiltshire and Ann, daughter of Sir Edward Baynton. His father was a younger brother of Giles Poole of Sapperton, Gloucestershire. His sister married Giles Fettiplace. He inherited the family estate on the death of his elder brother Richard (d. 1556). The estate included the leases of Oaksey Park and Poole Keynes and Chelworth Farm, Cricklade.

In 1563 he was elected to the Parliament of England for Malmesbury, presumably through his association with Sir James Stumpe, who had married his wife's sister Bridget. No evidence of any activity undertaken by him as an MP survives.

He married Margaret (d.1597), daughter of Thomas Walton of Kemble, Gloucestershire. He was the father of Henry Poole, 2 younger sons and 3 daughters:

- Katherine married Thomas Fettiplace
- Margaret
- Elinor married Henry Neville of Bathwick, a younger son of Edward Nevill, 7th Baron Bergavenny

He died in April 1578, presumably in Cirencester where he wrote his will the previous month. He was buried at Poole Keynes. His freestone monument, subsequently described as 'very ill donne', incorrectly says he died in April 1577, and gives his age as 48.
