= Philip Miles =

Philip Miles may refer to:

- Sir Philip Miles, 2nd Baronet (1825–1888), English politician
- Philip Napier Miles (1865–1935), British composer and philanthropist
- Philip John Miles, British Member of Parliament for Bristol, Westbury and Corfe Castle
- Philip William Skinner Miles, British Member of Parliament for Bristol
- Sir Philip John Miles, 7th Baronet (born 1953), of the Miles baronets
- Philip Miles (Indian Army officer) (1864–1948), British officer of the Indian Army
- Philip Miles (cricketer) (1848–1933), English army officer and cricketer
