= Charles Miles (cricketer, born 1854) =

English cricketer and British Army officer

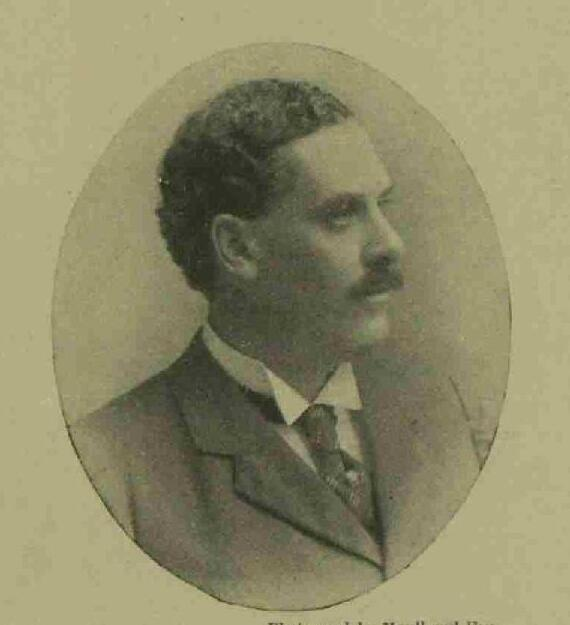

Personal information
- Full name: Charles Napier Miles
- Born: 9 April 1854; Clifton, Bristol, England
- Died: 25 May 1918 (aged 64); Malmesbury, Wiltshire, England
- Batting: Right-handed
- Relatives: Audley Miles (brother); Philip Miles (cousin); Robert Miles (cousin)

Career statistics
Competition	First-class
Matches	1
Runs scored	8
Batting average	8.00
100s/50s	–/–
Top score	8
Catches/stumpings	–/–
- Source: Cricinfo, 3 February 2022

Charles Napier Miles CB MVO (9 April 1854 — 25 May 1918) was a British Army officer and English first-class cricketer.

Miles was born in Bristol at Clifton in April 1854 to the politician William Miles (1823 - 1892). He was educated at Eton College, where he played for the college cricket eleven.

After completing his education, Miles was commissioned into the Royal North Gloucestershire Militia as a lieutenant in July 1872.

He transferred from the militia to the regular army in November 1875, joining the 1st Regiment of Life Guards. Miles served in the Anglo-Egyptian War of 1882, being mentioned in dispatches and being decorated with the Khedive's Star. He was promoted to captain shortly after the conclusion of the conflict, with promotion to major following a little over a decade later in December 1893.

His next promotion followed in June 1895, when he was made a brevet lieutenant colonel, before gaining the rank in full in December 1898. Miles later served in the Second Boer War, where he commanded a composite regiment of the Household Cavalry. In 1901, he was made both a Member of the Royal Victorian Order, 4th Class in May, and a Companion to the Order of the Bath in September. Following the end of the war, Miles was placed on the half-pay list on completion of his period in command and was made a brevet colonel in December 1902. In November 1903, he was one of three nominees for High Sheriff of Wiltshire in 1904, but was beaten to the nomination by Hugh Morrison. Miles died at Inglebourne Manor near Malmesbury in May 1918, following an operation.

In 1874, he made a single appearance in first-class cricket for the Gentlemen of Marylebone Cricket Club against the Gentlemen of Kent at the Canterbury Cricket Week. Batting once in the match, he was dismissed for 8 runs by Henry Renny-Tailyour.

His brother, Audley, also a played first-class cricket, as did his cousins Philip Miles and Robert Miles.
