= Sir Charles Forbes, 1st Baronet =

Scottish politician (1774-1849)

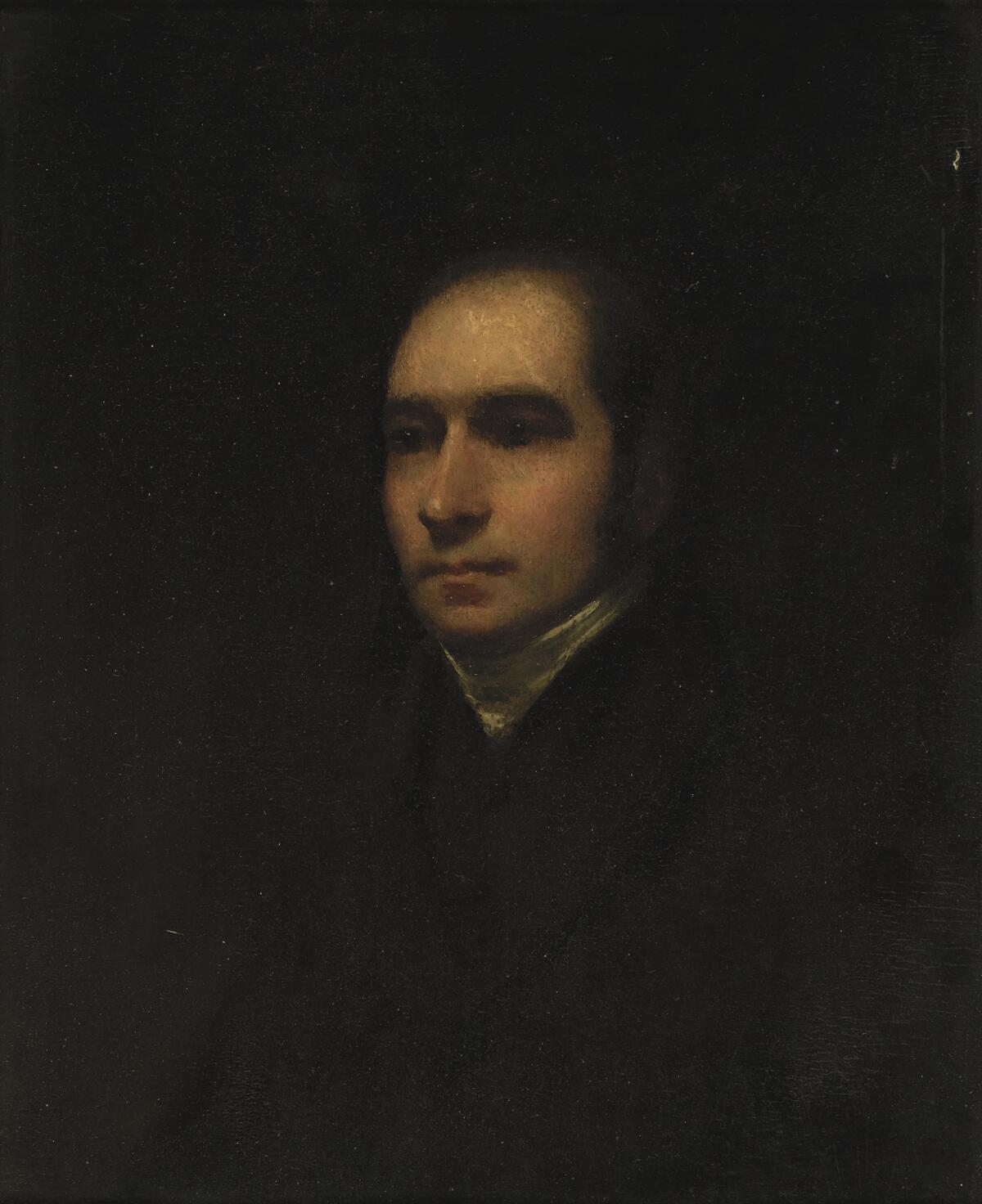
Sir Charles Forbes

Sir Charles Forbes, 1st Baronet (1774–1849) was a Scottish politician, of Newe and Edinglassie, Aberdeenshire. Forbes was the son of the Rev. George Forbes of Lochell. He was a descendant of Alexander Forbes of Kinaldie and Pitsligo, and was in 1833 served heir male in general to Alexander Forbes, 3rd Lord Forbes of Pitsligo, father of Alexander Forbes, 4th Lord Forbes of Pitsligo, attainted in 1745.

== Political career ==
Forbes was educated at Aberdeen University, of which, late in life (1814–1819), he was elected Lord Rector. Shortly after leaving the university he went out to India, and became the head of the first mercantile house there, Forbes & Co. of Bombay. His name ranked high in the commercial world for ability, foresight, and rectitude of character. On returning to England, he was elected to parliament for the borough of Beverley, and represented that place from 1812 to 1818. In the latter year he was returned for Malmesbury, and continued to represent that town until the passing of the Reform Bill of 1832. As a member of the House of Commons he enjoyed the respect of all parties, for his love of justice, kindly feeling, and plain, straightforward honesty. Though a tory of the tories, he "never allowed his political creed to cloud his fine judgment and keen sense of right and wrong, and his manly spirit was readily engaged in favour of the poor, the weak, and the persecuted". He warmly supported catholic emancipation; and when the Duke of Wellington incurred great unpopularity in 1830, Forbes pronounced in the House of Commons a warm panegyric on the duke's conduct.

Forbes was one of the earliest to advocate the claims of women to the franchise. In the session of 1831 he asked upon what reasonable grounds they could be excluded from political rights, pointing out that ladies had the power of voting for directors of the East India Company, and maintaining that if the right of voting was grounded on the possession of property, there ought to be no distinction of sex. Forbes was a strong opponent of the Reform Bill of 1831–2. During the debates in the former session he spoke of the measure as "the vile Reform Bill, that hideous monster, the most frightful that ever showed its face in that house". He promised to pursue it to the last with uncompromising hostility, and if it were carried to abandon parliament. He put forward an urgent plea for Malmesbury. The borough, after much angry discussion, was left with one member only. Forbes vainly contested Middlesex against Joseph Hume at the general election of 1832.

== Philanthropy in India ==
He was most distinguished in connection with India. From his long residence in the East, he knew the people intimately, and he spent a large portion of his fortune in their midst. In parliament and in the proprietors' court of the East India Company his advocacy of justice for India was ardent and untiring. One of his last acts was the appropriation of a very large sum of money to procure for the inhabitants of Bengal a plentiful supply of pure water in all seasons. His fame spread from one end of Hindostan to the other. When he left India he was presented by the natives with a magnificent service of plate, and twenty-seven years after his departure from Bombay the sum of £9,000 was subscribed for the erection of a statue to his honour. The work was entrusted to Sir Francis Chantrey, and the statue now stands in the town hall of Bombay, between those of Mountstuart Elphinstone and Sir John Malcolm. It was the first instance on record of the people of India raising a statue to any one unconnected with the civil or military service of the country. An address, signed by 1,042 of the principal native and other inhabitants of Bombay, expatiated upon his services to the commercial development of the country and the improvement in the position of the natives. In his private charities Forbes was most liberal; he was also a munificent contributor to the leading public charities of Scotland.

== Family ==
Forbes was of a bluff but kindly nature, diffident as to his own merits, of a straightforward and manly character. On the death of his uncle in 1821, Forbes succeeded to the entailed estates of the Forbeses of Newe, and was created a baronet by patent in 1823.

He married Elizabeth Cotgrave (d. 1861) in 1811. Forbes died in 1849. Their eldest son, John, had predeceased his father: the title was inherited by their second son, Charles. Their daughter, Elizabeth, married General, Lord James Hay, second son of the seventh Marquess of Tweeddale.

== Coat of arms ==
Coat of arms of Sir Charles Forbes, 1st Baronet
Crest A falcon rising proper. Escutcheon Quarterly: 1st and 4th azure, three bears' heads couped argent, muzzled gules (Forbes), 2nd and 3rd, azure, three cinquefoils argent (Fraser). Supporters Two bears argent, muzzled gules. Motto Altius ibunt qui ad summa nituntur (They will attain a higher point, who strive at things the most exalted)

Parliament of the United Kingdom
Preceded by Howard Vyse; John Wharton	Member of Parliament for Beverley; 1812 – 1818; With: John Wharton	Succeeded by Robert Christie Burton; John Wharton
Preceded by Sir William Abdy, Bt; Peter Patten	Member of Parliament for Malmesbury; 1818 – 1832; With: Kirkman Finlay 1818–20; William Leake 1820–26; John Forbes 1826–32	Succeeded by Viscount Andover
Baronetage of the United Kingdom
New title	Baronet (of Newe, Aberdeenshire); 1823 – 1849	Succeeded by Charles Forbes
