= Thomas Edgar =

Thomas Edgar may refer to:

- Thomas Edgar (MP) (died 1547), 16th-century English politician
- Thomas F. Edgar (born 1945), American chemical engineer
- Thomas Edgar (volleyball) (born 1989), Australian volleyball player
