= Henry Knyvet (died 1547) =

English member of the gentry

Sir Henry Knyvet of Charlton in Wiltshire and East Horsley in Surrey was a member of the English gentry.

== Early life and family ==
Knyvet was the son of Thomas Knyvett and Muriel Howard, the widow of John Grey, the second Viscount Lisle. Muriel Howard was the daughter of Thomas Howard, and Elizabeth Tilney, and through the Howard connection, Knyvett was related to many of the English nobility.

Knyvet's father died aboard the HMS Regent, which burst into flames, during the Battle of St. Mathieu in 1512, while his mother died in childbirth four months later. He and his siblings were brought up by their grandmother, Eleanor Knyvett.

Knyvet's siblings were Edmund, Katherine, Ferdinand, and Anne.

== Career ==
Knyvet was knighted some time after 15 November 1538.

Knyvet had lands in Surrey and was for several years a gentleman of the privy chamber, ambassador to Charles V in 1540–1541, in 1545 marshal of Hertford's army in Scotland, and in 1546, the year of his death, captain of the horsemen at Guisnes.

In 1542, Knyvet was under a cloud when he was recalled from the Emperor's court and lingered at Orléans on his return from Spain until he knew what to expect.

Knyvet was one of the party who received Anne of Cleves within a mile of Calais.

== Marriage and children ==
Knyvet married Anne Pickering, the daughter and heiress of Christopher Pickering. Knyvett and Anne had six children:

- Henry (1537–1598) of Charlton Park, Wiltshire, English member of parliament.
- Elizabeth
- Alice
- Katherine (1543–1622), who married Henry Paget, 2nd Baron Paget, and then Sir Edward Cary of Berkhamsted and Aldenham, Hertfordshire. She was known as the "Baroness Paget Cary".
- Thomas, a member of parliament who played a part in foiling the Gunpowder Plot
- Margaret, who married Henry Vavasour of Tadcaster, Copmanthorpe, Yorkshire

== Death ==
Knyvet died perhaps around 1546.
