= Nicholas Weston =

Nicholas Weston may refer to:

- Nicholas Weston (MP for Newtown) (1611–1656)
- Nicholas Weston (MP for Malmesbury) (fl. 1373–1383)
