= Thomas Bonde =

Member of the Parliament of England

Thomas Bonde (fl. c.1400) was the member of Parliament for Malmesbury for the parliament of 1402.
