= Thomas Froud =

Member of the Parliament of England

Thomas Froud (fl. 1390s) was the member of Parliament for Malmesbury for the parliament of 1395.
