= William Blankpayn =

14th-century English politician

William Blankpayn (fl. 1390s) was a butcher who was member of Parliament for Malmesbury for the parliaments of January 1390, 1393, 1394, January 1397, and September 1397.
