= Henry Howard, 18th Earl of Suffolk =

British peer and Liberal Party politician

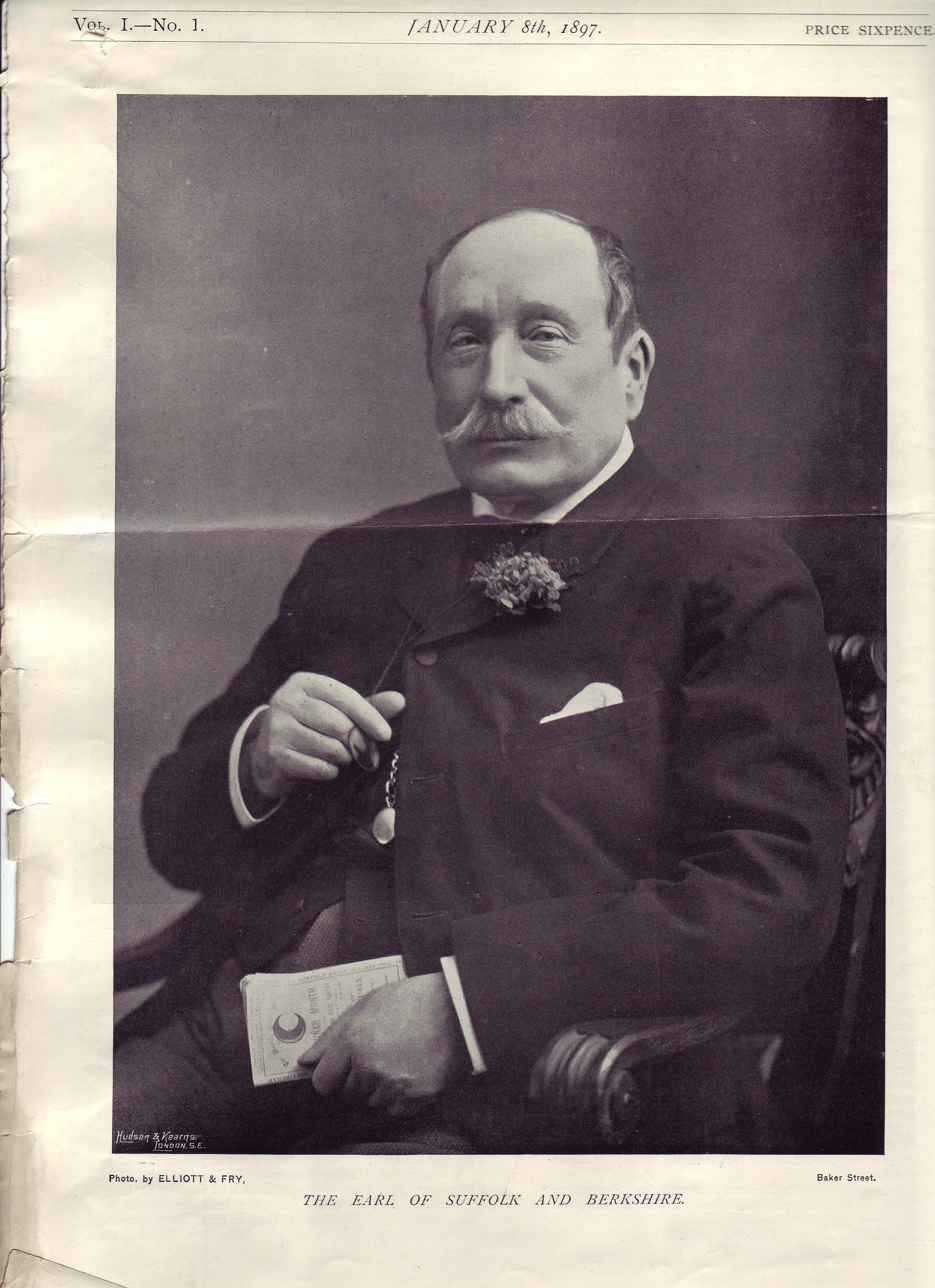
The Earl of Suffolk as published in the first issue of Country Life, 8 January 1897

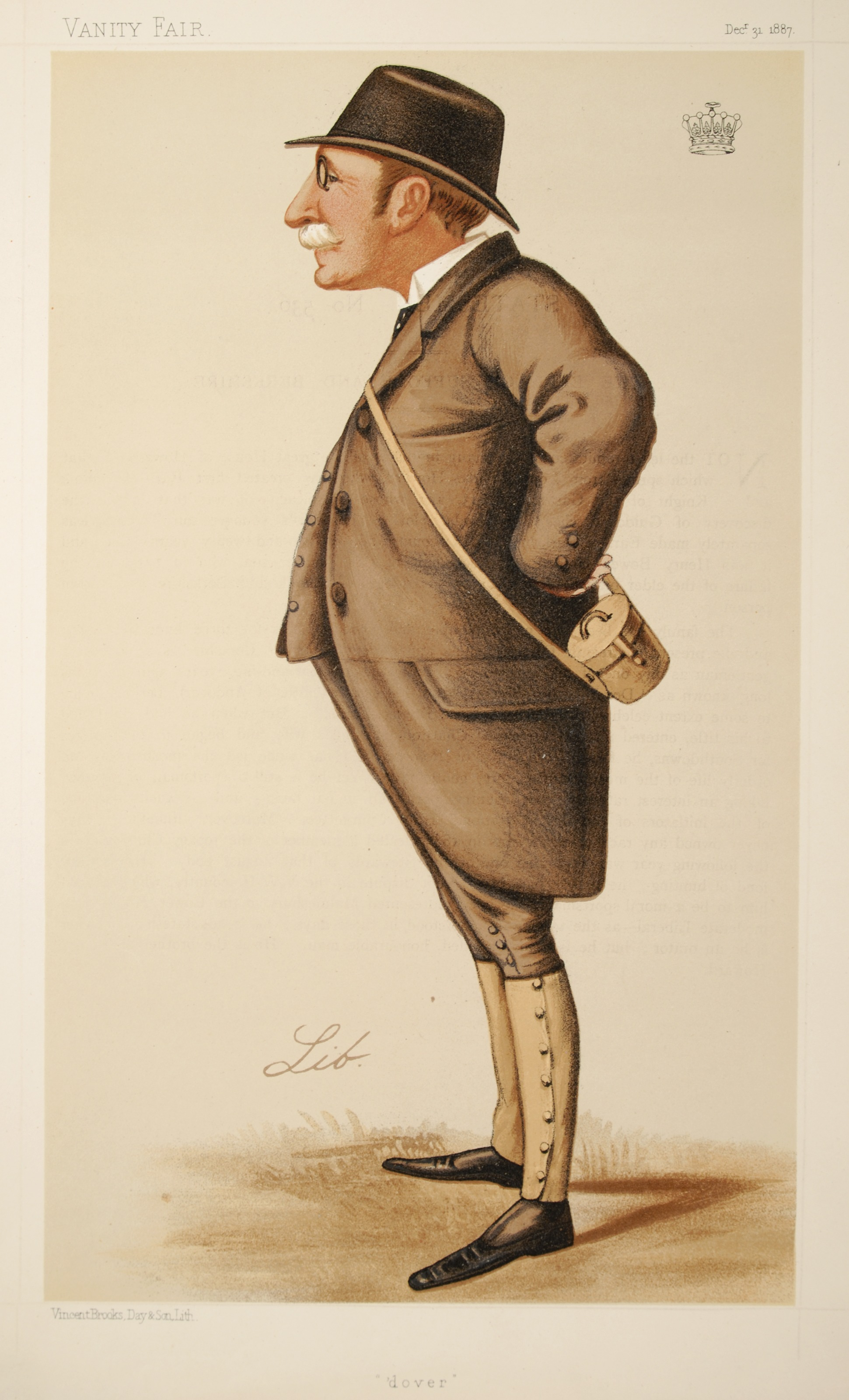
"Dover". Caricature by Lib published in Vanity Fair in 1887.

Henry Charles Howard, 18th Earl of Suffolk, 11th Earl of Berkshire (10 September 1833 – 31 March 1898), styled Viscount Andover between 1851 and 1876, was a British peer and Liberal Party politician from the Howard family. A sporting enthusiast, he was a member of the Jockey Club and sportswriter.

== Early life and education ==
Suffolk was the eldest son of Charles Howard, 17th Earl of Suffolk, and Isabella Catherine, daughter of Lord Henry Thomas Howard-Molyneux-Howard.

He was educated at Harrow.

== Political career ==
At the 1859 general election, Howard was elected unopposed as the Member of Parliament (MP) for the Borough of Malmesbury in Wiltshire, a seat his father held 1832–41. He was re-elected in 1865 in a two-way contest, but was defeated at the 1868 general election. In 1876, he succeeded his father in the united earldoms of Suffolk and Berkshire and entered the House of Lords. He was also a member of Wiltshire County Council from 1889.

== Marriage and issue ==
Lord Suffolk married Mary Eleanor Lauderdale, daughter of the Hon. Henry Amelius Coventry (son of Lord Coventry), in 1868. They had seven children:

- Lady Mary Muriel Sophie Howard (1 March 1870 – 19 February 1938), married her first cousin Henry Robert Beauclerk Coventry and had issue.
- Unnamed daughter (born and died 5 October 1871), died shortly after birth
- Lady Eleanor Mabel Howard (11 February 1873 – 9 March 1945), married Maj. Hon. Lionel Byng, son of George Byng, 2nd Earl of Strafford, in 1902 and had issue; married Henry Atkinson in 1922
- Lady Agnes Isabel Howard (30 June 1874 – 16 October 1970), married Maj. Arthur Poynter DSO in 1917
- Henry Molyneux Paget Howard, 19th Earl of Suffolk (1877–1917), killed in action in the First World War
- Lady Katherine Millicent Howard (10 September 1883 – 1 April 1961)
- Hon. James Knyvett Estcourt Howard (1 May 1886 – 5 December 1964), married Nancy Lubbock (daughter of Edgar Lubbock and Amy Myddelton Peacock) and had issue

He died in March 1898, aged 64, and was succeeded in his titles by his eldest son, Henry. The Countess of Suffolk died in October 1928, aged 81. Among his descendants are the actor and comedian Humphrey Ker.

== Bibliography ==
- Suffolk and Berkshire, Henry Charles Howard; Peek, Hedley; Aflalo, Frederick G., eds. (1898). The Encyclopædia of sport. New York: G.P. Putnam. OCLC 1483839.

Parliament of the United Kingdom
| Preceded by Thomas Luce | Member of Parliament for Malmesbury; 1859 – 1868 | Succeeded by Walter Powell |
Peerage of England
| Preceded by Charles John Howard | Earl of Suffolk; 1876 – 1898 | Succeeded by Henry Howard |
| Preceded by Charles John Howard | Earl of Berkshire; 1876 – 1898 | Succeeded by Henry Howard |
