= Walter Powell (MP for Malmesbury) =

British politician (1842–1881)

- Born: 17 April 1842; Newport, Monmouthshire, Wales
- Disappeared: 10 December 1881 (aged 39); English Channel
- Occupations: Colliery owner, politician
- Known for: Disappearing over the English Channel during a balloon flight

Walter Powell (17 April 1842 – 10 December 1881) was a Welsh colliery owner and Conservative politician who sat in the House of Commons from 1868 to 1881. He was carried out over the English Channel in a balloon and never seen again.

== Early life and education ==
Powell was the son of Thomas Powell of Newport, Monmouthshire and his wife Anne Williams, daughter of Walter Williams. His father had interests in coal, railways and shipping and was one of the world's largest coal producers in the 1840s. His company now operates under the name of Powell Duffryn plc in the areas of ports and engineering, although the coal and railway interests were nationalised in the 1940s.

Powell was the youngest of three brothers and had three sisters. He was educated at Rugby School and continued in the family business. In 1869 he had to journey to Africa to take care of family matters after the murders of his brother Thomas and Thomas's wife and son by robbers on a trip to Abyssinia. Powell was a justice of the peace for Wiltshire. His great interest was ballooning. This interest developed in the late 1870s and he began studying ballooning with Henry Coxwell, one of the leading balloonists of the day. Eventually Powell made his own ascents and had a balloon of his own, the Eclipse.

== Member of Parliament ==
At the 1868 general election Powell was elected Member of Parliament for Malmesbury, Wiltshire. He held the seat until his disappearance and presumed death from a balloon accident at the age of 39 in 1881.

== Disappearance ==
The Meteorological Society had borrowed a balloon called Saladin from the War Office. On 10 December 1881, Powell accompanied James Templer and A. Agg-Gardner, brother of James Agg-Gardner MP, in an ascent at Bath, Somerset. The balloon was carried over Somerset to Exeter and then into Dorset. The crew tried to descend near Bridport but the balloon hit the ground so hard that Templer was thrown out. As a result, the balloon rose again; Agg-Gardner fell out from a height of about 8 feet (2.4 m) and broke his leg, and Powell, remaining in the car, was swept out to sea to the south-east. He was last seen waving his hand to Captain Templer. It seemed likely that he might have crashed into the English Channel, and a search was made for three days. The beaches on England's southern coast were combed for washed-up wreckage or clues, but neither Powell nor the balloon were recovered. The by-election to replace him as MP for Malmesbury was held on 7 March 1882.

== Memorials ==
In 1982, when a new primary school was built to serve the Wiltshire villages of Great Somerford and Little Somerford, it was named Somerfords Walter Powell Primary School.

== See also ==
- List of missing aircraft
- List of people who disappeared mysteriously at sea

Parliament of the United Kingdom
Preceded by Viscount Andover	Member of Parliament for Malmesbury; 1868–1881	Succeeded by Charles William Miles
