= Thomas Corbyn =

Member of the Parliament of England

Thomas Corbyn (fl. 1410s) was the member of Parliament for Malmesbury for the parliaments of March 1416 and 1417.
