= James Howard (Whig politician) =

British politician

The Honourable James Kenneth Howard (5 March 1814 – 7 January 1882) was a British Whig politician.

A member of the Howard family, he was the fourth son of Thomas Howard, 16th Earl of Suffolk, by the Honourable Elizabeth Jane, daughter of James Dutton, 1st Baron Sherborne. He succeeded his elder brother Viscount Andover as Member of Parliament for Malmesbury in 1841, a seat he held until 1852. From 1851 to 1882 he served as a Commissioner of Woods, Forests and Land Revenues.

Howard married Lady Louisa, daughter of Henry Petty-FitzMaurice, 3rd Marquess of Lansdowne, in 1845. He died in January 1882, aged 67. Lady Louisa died in June 1906. Their grandson was the explorer and politician Charles Howard-Bury.

Parliament of the United Kingdom
Preceded by Viscount Andover	Member of Parliament for Malmesbury; 1841–1852	Succeeded by Thomas Luce
Government offices
Preceded by Hon. Charles Alexander Gore; Thomas Francis Kennedy	Commissioner of Woods, Forests and Land Revenues; 1855–1882 with Hon. Charles Alexander Gore	Succeeded by Hon. Charles Alexander Gore; Sir Henry Loch
