= Richard Cooper (cricketer, born 1945) =

English cricketer (1945–1990)

Personal information
- Full name: Richard Claude Cooper
- Born: 9 December 1945; Malmesbury, Wiltshire, England
- Died: 14 March 1990 (aged 44); Crudwell, Wiltshire, England
- Batting: Right-handed
- Bowling: Right-arm medium
- Role: Batsman

Domestic team information
- Years: Team
- 1972: Somerset
- Only FC: 17 May 1972 Somerset v Nottinghamshire
- LA debut: 29 April 1972 Somerset v Minor Counties South
- Last LA: 28 July 1989 Wiltshire v Warwickshire

Career statistics
Competition	First-class	List A
Matches	1	22
Runs scored	4	458
Batting average	2.00	21.80
100s/50s	0/0	0/2
Top score	4	95
Balls bowled	–	176
Wickets	–	4
Bowling average	–	45.50
5 wickets in innings	–	0
10 wickets in match	–	0
Best bowling	–	2/38
Catches/stumpings	0/–	4/–
- Source: CricketArchive, 29 May 2010

Richard Claude Cooper (9 December 1945 – 14 March 1990) played cricket for Wiltshire in the Minor Counties between 1967 and 1989 and had one season as a first-class cricketer for Somerset in 1972. He appeared in just one first-class match, but had a much longer career in List A cricket for Wiltshire, Somerset and Minor Counties representative teams. He was born at Malmesbury, Wiltshire and died suddenly of a heart attack at Crudwell, Wiltshire.

Cooper was a burly, hard-hitting right-handed middle-order batsman and an irregular right-arm medium-pace bowler whose physique and style brought comparisons with Colin Milburn. He played for Wiltshire from 1967 and in 1970 made two centuries in the match against Somerset's Second Eleven in the Minor Counties Championship. He was then recruited to the first-class game by Somerset for the 1972 season. Business commitments restricted his first-class appearances for Somerset to just one, in which he scored only four runs, but he played fairly regularly in List A cricket and an innings of 95 in his first Benson and Hedges Cup game, against the Minor Counties, won him the Gold Award for the match. Wisden noted that he showed "flair and temperament" and that he "proved to be a composed, powerful straight hitter in the one-day games". However, in 1973 he remained in Somerset's second team, making no first-team appearances, and following a further unproductive year in 1974 he returned to Wiltshire.

As a Minor Counties player, he appeared in representative sides in the major List A competitions in 1975 and 1976, and again for Wiltshire between 1983 and 1989. In Minor Counties cricket, he scored more than 5000 runs for Wiltshire and was captain of the side right up to 1989, the season before his early death.
