= William Leslie of Nethermuir =

Scottish architect

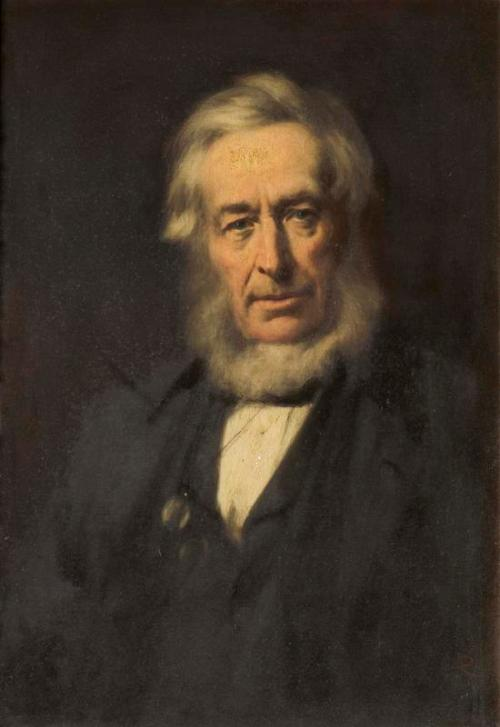
William Leslie of Nethermuir, Lord Provost of Aberdeen (1869-73) - Sir George Reid

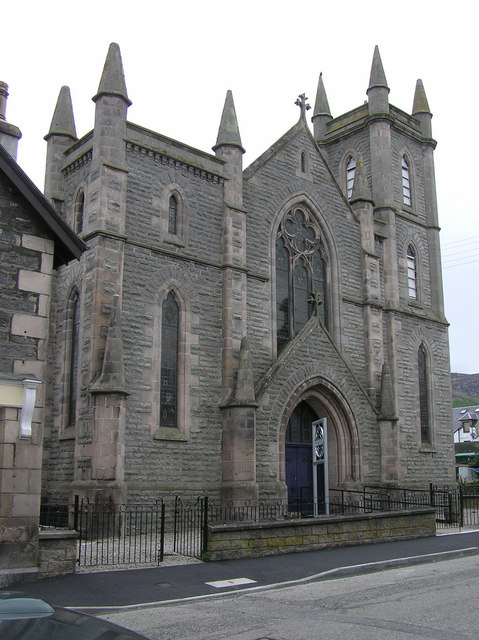
The new frontage on Kingussie Parish Church by Leslie

Sir William Leslie of Nethermuir (1802–1879) was a Scottish architect and building contractor who served as Lord Provost of Aberdeen 1869 to 1873.

== Life ==
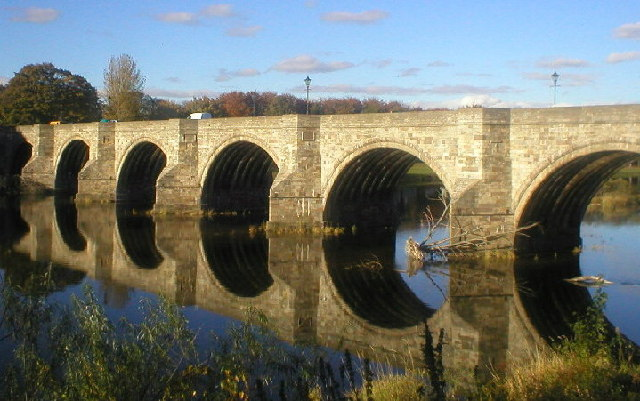
The Bridge of Dee, Aberdeen

He was born at New Deer in Aberdeenshire into a Congregationalist family.

By 1828 he was an established architect in Aberdeen living at Park Cottage on Broadford. He also started operating as a building contractor, and in this capacity was one of the city's largest employers, employing over 150 men. In 1836 he was appointed agent for the repair and maintenance of the Duke of Sutherland's estates undertaking, design, engineering and construction tasks.

In 1838 he formed a new company: McDonald & Leslie, based in Dornoch, having merged with granite sculptors Alexander NcDonald & Co. His work began to gravitate mainly to Aberdeen and in 1850 he opened an office at 8 Golden Square. In 1853 he dissolved the partnership with McDonald and began to concentrate on Aberdeen affairs, becoming a town councillor around this time.

In 1866 he privately financed the building of Woodside Congregational Church (now Church of Scotland).

From 1868 his business address was 123 Union Street, Aberdeen.

He was elected Lord Provost of Aberdeen in 1869 being succeeded in 1874 by George Jamieson.

Around 1872 he remodelled Nethermuir House in New Deer as his home. The house bears a lintel of 1595 but was largely built around 1803. It is now ruinous but is a listed building.

He died at his Aberdeen townhouse, 28 Albyn Place, on 18 February 1879.

== Works as architect ==
- New castellated entrance lodge and gates at Hatton Castle, Aberdeenshire (1828)
- Remodelling of Kingussie Parish Church (1833)
- Restoration of Dornoch Cathedral (1835)
- Remodelling of Dunrobin Castle (1844)
- Dornoch Academy (1845)
- Lairg Parish Church (1845)
- Dunnet manse (1846)
- Major extension to Uppat House in Golspie (1846)
- Reconstruction of ferry pier and boathouse at Golspie (c.1850}
- Flagstaff Lodge, Dunrobin Castle (c.1850)
- Remodelling of Dunbeath Castle (1851)
- Lochmore Lodge, Ross and Cromarty (1851)
- Albion Street Congregational Church, Aberdeen (1854)
- Manse, Old Aberdeen (1855)
- Belmont Congregational Church, Aberdeen (1864) for James Souttar
- Woodside Congregational Church (1866)
- Nethermuir House at New Deer (1872) either a replacement or remodelling of his family home

== Works as builder ==
- Craibstone House in Dyce near Aberdeen (1829, now demolished)
- North Church, Aberdeen (1829) to design of John Smith
- Castle Newe (1831) for Archibald Simpson as architect, now demolished
- Bridge of Dee, Aberdeen (1840) to design of engineer James Walker of London
- Dunrobin Castle (1845) partly his own design and partly that of Sir Charles Barry

== Artistic recognition ==
He was portrayed by Sir George Reid around 1873. The portrait is held by Aberdeen Art Gallery and Museum.

=== Gallery ===
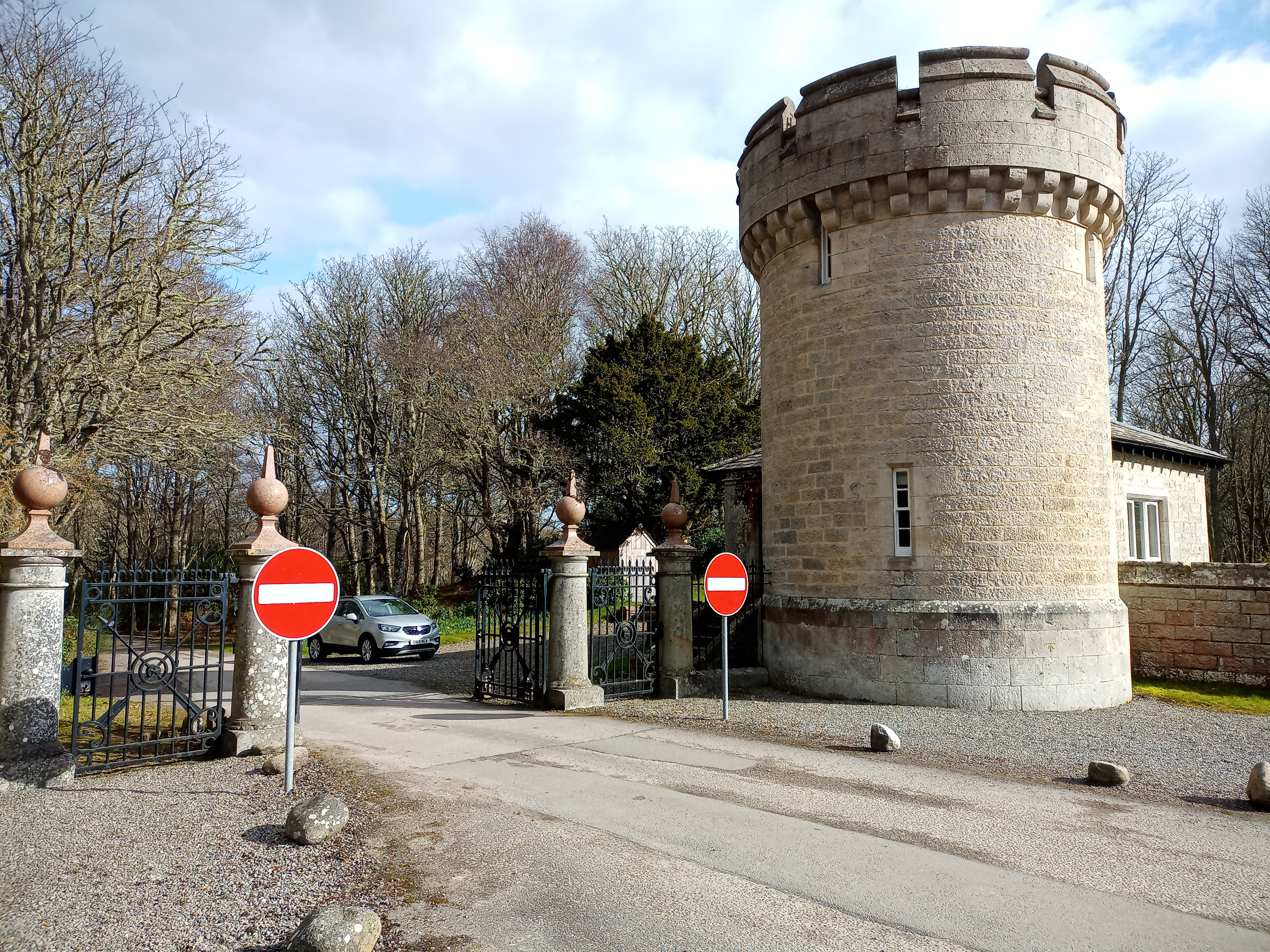
Dunrobin Castle, Flagstaff Lodge

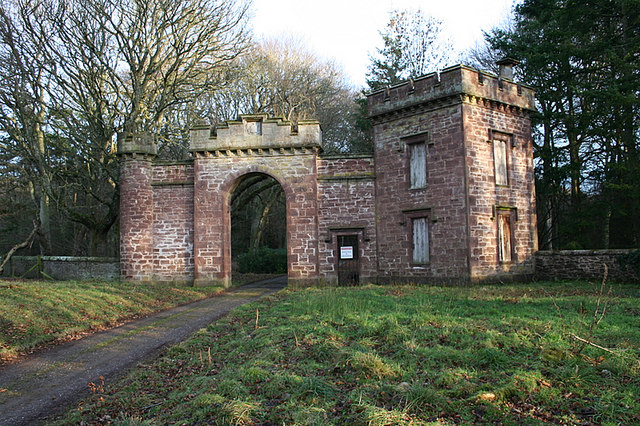
Gatehouse to Hatton Castle

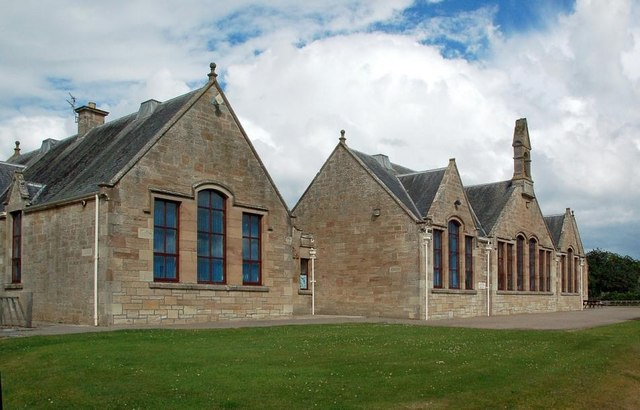
Old Dornoch Academy

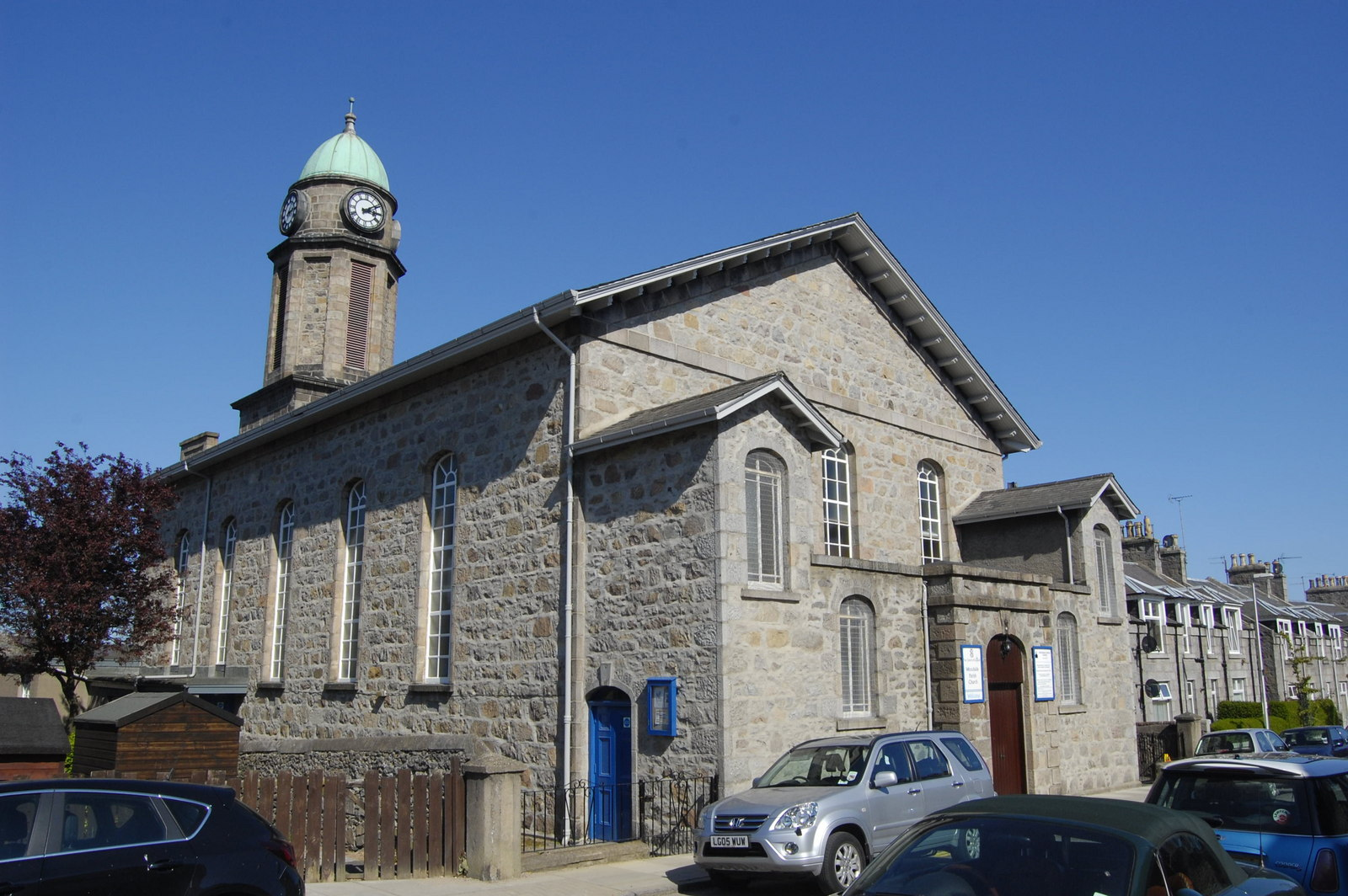
Woodside Church in Aberdeen

Civic offices
Preceded by Alexander Nicol	Lord Provost of Aberdeen; 1869–1874	Succeeded by George Jamieson
