= Robert Newman (fl. 1397–1413) =

English politician

Robert Newman was the member of Parliament for Malmesbury in the parliaments of January 1397 and 1399, and Cricklade in May 1413.
