= Kirkman Finlay =

Scottish merchant and politician

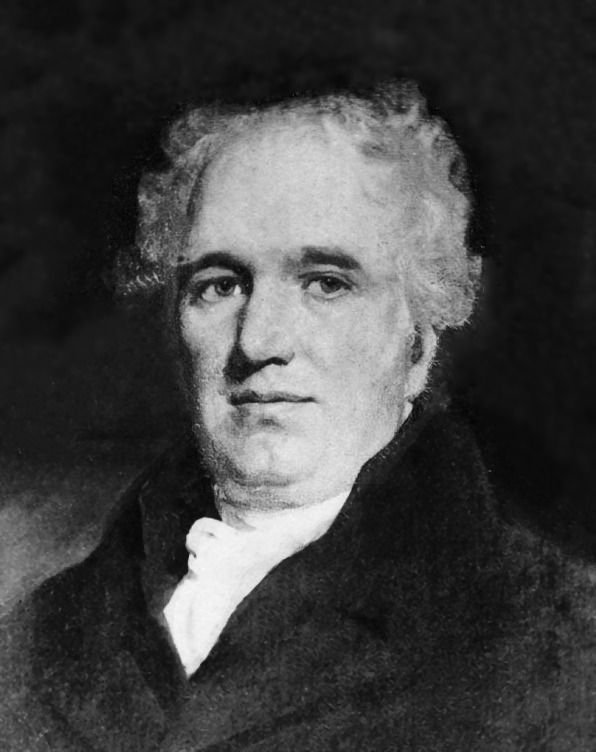

Member of Parliament for Malmesbury
- In office 1818–1820

Member of Parliament for Glasgow burghs
- In office 1812–1818
- Preceded by: Alexander Houstoun
- Succeeded by: Alexander Houstoun

Personal details
- Born: April 1773 Glasgow, Scotland
- Died: 4 March 1842 (aged 69) UK
- Party: Tory
- Education: University of Glasgow
- Profession: Businessman, Politician

Kirkman Finlay (April 1773 – 4 March 1842) was one of the leading merchants in Glasgow, Scotland. He was Lord Provost of Glasgow and Member of Parliament.

== Life ==
Kirkman Finlay was born in the Gallowgate, the second son of well known Glasgow merchant and textile manufacturer James Finlay (1727–1790). Upon his father's death in 1790 he became head of James Finlay & Co, manufacturers and East India merchants. He made strenuous efforts to capture lucrative Asian markets, successfully challenging the supremacy of the British East India Company in trade with India and the Far East. Under his leadership the business expanded, moving into cotton manufacturing with the purchase of the Ballindalloch Works in 1798, the Catrine Mills in 1801 and the Deanston Mills in 1806.. They became the largest textile concern in Scotland and the first British merchant to trade directly with India (1816).

Whilst developing James Finlay & Co. into the leading merchant firm of its time he also led a very active public life. He was Governor of the Forth and Clyde Navigation, President of the Glasgow Chamber of Commerce eight times, Dean of Guild, Lord Provost of Glasgow (1812), Member of Parliament (1812–1820). A marble statue by John Gibson (1790–1866) is in the vestibule of the Merchants' House on George Square.

His opinions, especially on mercantile questions, were listened to when he was in the House of Commons, and quoted there when he had left it; always a busy man, he still found time for much public and charitable work – he was a liberal and a kindly man, and his word was as good as his bond.

In 1819 he was elected Lord Rector of Glasgow University.

Described as "a political economist of an advanced type", his knowledge of banking was considerable. He was an extraordinary director of The Royal Bank of Scotland from 1821 until his death in 1842, and made his presence felt in many matters of importance in Scotland at that time. He was part of the abortive scheme to raise a joint-stock bank in Glasgow around 1793, he agitated for the retention of the Scottish one pound note in 1826 (appearing before the House of Commons Committee on Promissory notes in Scotland and Ireland), and was also active in opposing the changes to factory conditions in 1833.

Finlay's financial success demonstrated the central importance of cotton textiles in Glasgow's domestic economy and he deserves a place on the roll of those who have helped to make Glasgow.

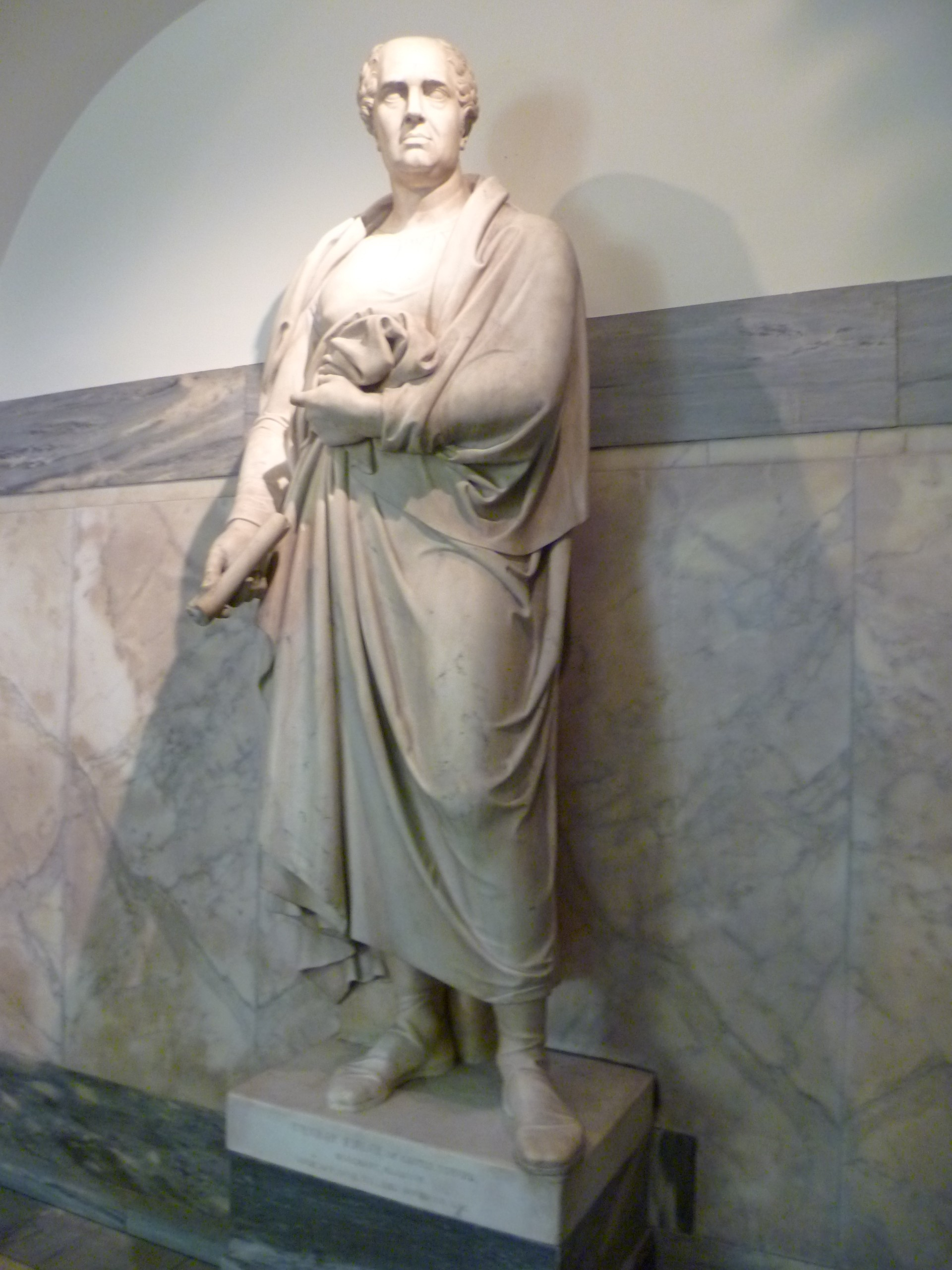
Statue in the Merchants' House, Glasgow

In 1820 he built Castle Toward on the Cowal peninsula as his country home and he died there in 1842.

Finlay was educated at the Glasgow Grammar School and briefly studied at the University of Glasgow and was elected its Rector in 1819. In 1820, unfounded rumours spread around the university that he was building up a motion to disallow student voting at rectorial elections. In the resulting student campaign Finlay was defeated in the re-election by Francis Jeffrey. He however later served as Dean of Faculties between 1839 and 1840.

== Family ==
His daughter Hannah Finlay married Thomas Grahame second son of Robert Grahame of Whitehill, Lord Provost of Glasgow 1833/4.

Finlay's nephew George Finlay was a noted historian and philhellene. His cousin Mary was mother to the merchants and politicians John and Alexander Dennistoun.

Finlay Avenue, Campberdown, Victoria, Australia is named for the brothers (C)olin Campbell and Alexander Kirkman Finlay, his grandsons. Campbell Finlay died at Castle Toward on 15 February 1899.

Political offices
Preceded by John Hamilton	Lord Provost of Glasgow; 1812–1814	Succeeded by Henry Montieth
Preceded by James Black	Lord Provost of Glasgow; 1818	Succeeded by Henry Montieth
Parliament of the United Kingdom
Preceded by Alexander Houstoun	Member of Parliament for Clyde Burghs; 1812–1818	Succeeded by Alexander Houstoun
Preceded by Peter Patten; Sir William Abdy, Bt	Member of Parliament for Malmesbury; 1818–1820; With: Sir Charles Forbes	Succeeded by William Leake; Sir Charles Forbes
Academic offices
Preceded by Earl of Glasgow	Rector of the University of Glasgow; 1819–1820	Succeeded by Lord Jeffrey
