= John Tanner =

John Tanner may refer to:

== Law and politics ==
- John Tanner (MP) (fl. c. 1402), English MP for Malmesbury
- John Riley Tanner (1844–1901), American governor of Illinois
- John Tanner (Tennessee politician) (born 1944), U.S. congressman

== Sports ==
- John Tanner (cricketer) (1772–1858), English cricketer
- John Tanner (American football, born 1897) (1897–1976), American football player
- John Tanner (footballer) (1921–1987), English footballer
- John Tanner (rugby union) (1927–2020), New Zealand rugby union player
- John Tanner (gridiron football, born 1945) (1945–2009), American football player
- John Tanner (cyclist) (born 1968), British racing cyclist
- John Tanner (ice hockey) (born 1971), Canadian ice hockey player

== Others ==
- John Tanner (bishop) (died 1615), Anglican bishop in Ireland
- John Sigismund Tanner (1705–1775), German-British engraver
- John Tanner (Mormon) (1778–1850), American Mormon leader
- John Tanner (captive) (1780–1846), American child kidnapped by Indians
- John Arthur Tanner (1858–1917), British Army officer
- John Sears Tanner (born 1950), American academic administrator

== Other uses ==
- John Tanner House, Petersburg, Kentucky, United States
- John Tanner State Park, Georgia, United States

== See also ==
- Jack Tanner (disambiguation)
