= Crudwell =

Coordinates: 51°38′02″N 2°04′08″W

- Village
- The Potting Shed pub, Crudwell

- Location within Wiltshire
- Population: 1,057 (in 2011)
- OS grid reference: ST953928
- Unitary authority: Wiltshire
- Ceremonial county: Wiltshire
- Region: South West
- Country: England
- Sovereign state: United Kingdom
- Post town: Malmesbury
- Postcode district: SN16
- Dialling code: 01666
- Police: Wiltshire
- Fire: Dorset and Wiltshire
- Ambulance: South Western
- UK Parliament: South Cotswolds
- Website: Parish Council

Crudwell is a village and civil parish in north Wiltshire, England, on the edge of the Cotswolds. The village is on the A429 between Malmesbury (about 4 miles (6 km) to the south) and Cirencester in Gloucestershire (8 miles (13 km) to the north-east).

== Geography ==
The parish includes the hamlets of Chedglow, Chelworth, Eastcourt, Murcott and West Crudwell. The Fosse Way, originally a Roman road, forms part of the parish and county boundary. The population of the parish changed little between 1831 (604) and 1951(618).

Although outside the Cotswolds National Landscape, Crudwell is often described as a Cotswolds village, as it is in close proximity to villages such as, Tetbury (5.8 miles (9.3km) to the west), which is situated inside the Cotswolds area.

Cotswold Airport is a short distance to the north-east. Kemble village, about 4 miles (6 km) away, has the nearest railway station, with services to London Paddington and Gloucester.

== History ==
The Domesday Book of 1086 recorded a large population of 107 households at Crudwell, and smaller settlements at Chelworth and Chedglow. Most of the parish belonged to Malmesbury Abbey's Brokenborough estate, which in the 13th century had a farmstead with a fishpond and a chapel. A large barn still stands to the south of All Saints' Church, probably dating from the 15th century and now Grade II* listed.

The road south to Malmesbury opened as a turnpike in 1778.

Manor Farm, east of the church, is probably from the 17th century, with additions in the 18th. The old rectory, now a hotel, is from the early 18th century, altered in the late 19th. The village became a conservation area in 1975.

A school was founded at Crudwell in the 17th century by Lord Lucas. In 1818 the school was not open on weekdays, the reason being that there was a small number of pupils. The schoolroom and schoolhouse of 1670 survive in residential use, south-west of the church. A new school was built in 1857, alongside the older buildings, became a National School, and then in 1949 a voluntary controlled school. A small school also opened at Eastcourt in about 1858 and became a National School. It closed in 1923 due to falling pupil numbers.

RAF Kemble was established in 1937 and opened in 1938 in the north of the parish and its site is now Cotswold Airport. It was a base for aircraft maintenance and ferrying, and later the home of the Red Arrows aerobatics display team from 1969 to 1983. In the 1980s the airfield became a maintenance base for the US Air Force. Military flying ended in 1993 when the site was used to store surplus equipment. It was sold into private ownership in 2001 and now houses businesses carrying out aircraft maintenance and dismantling, and technical training.

== Parish church ==
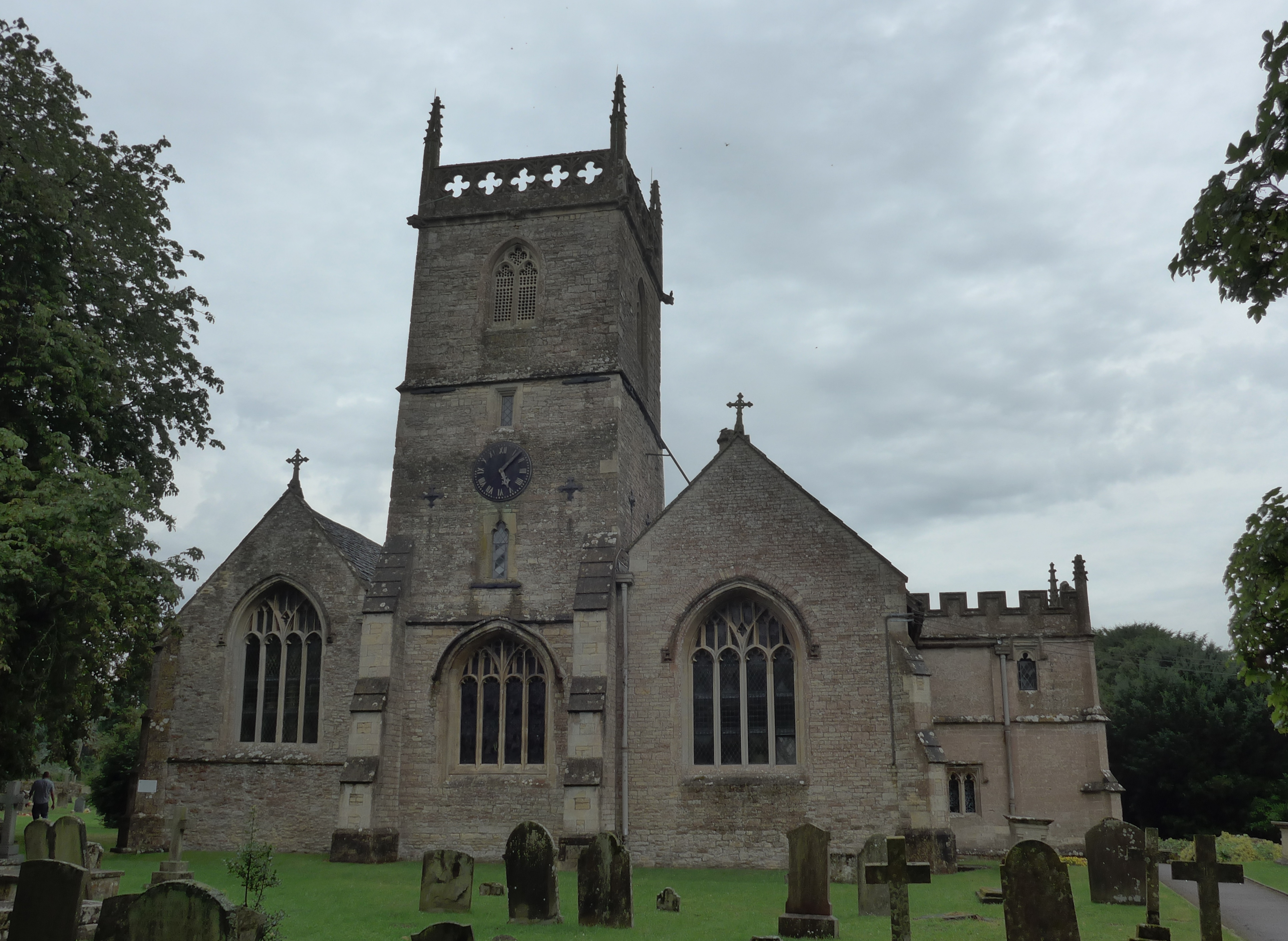
All Saints' Church

The Church of England Parish Church of All Saints, probably begun in the 11th century, is a Grade I listed building. Work from the 12th–15th centuries can be seen, with alterations and restoration in the 17th and 19th. The 15th-century stained glass in a north-east window depicts the seven sacraments. The tower has five bells, recast in 1858 by Mears.

In 1151 the church belonged to Malmesbury Abbey, and Hankerton church was dependent on it, but became a separate parish in 1445. There may have been a church house near the church in 1597 and c. 1670. The rectories of Crudwell and St James, Ashley (Gloucestershire) were united in 1954, and in 1987 the two churches joined with Hankerton and Oaksey to form the Braydon Brook group.

== Amenities ==
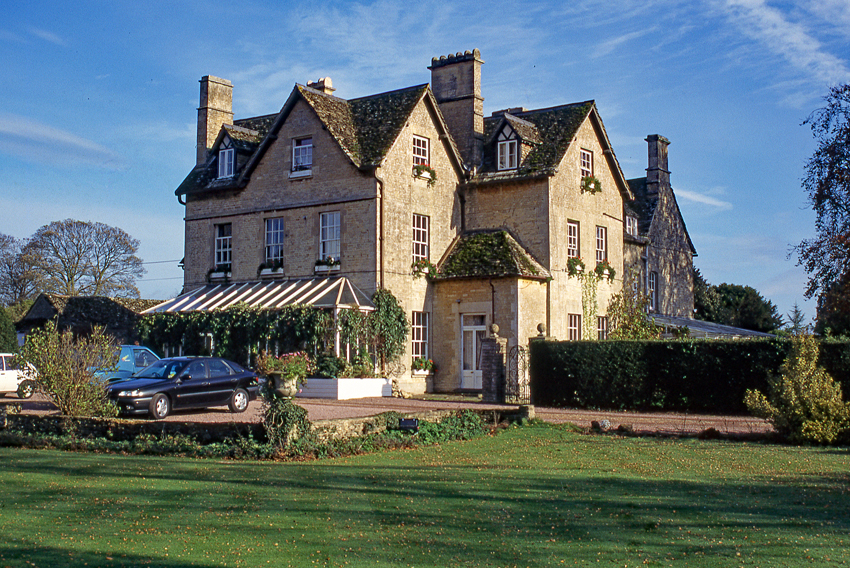
Crudwell rectory, now a hotel

The village school, extended in 1969, continues as Crudwell CE Primary School. The village hall, which can be hired for events, is the home of Crudwell Pre-School three days a week.

Crudwell has two pubs, The Potting Shed and the Wheatsheaf Inn, and two hotels, Pettifers Freehouse Hotel (Mayfield House Hotel until 2022) and The Rectory; the latter is a Grade II listed building. Murcott Farm Shop opened in 2025 at the former premises of Crudwell Garage; the village had not had a shop since 2004.

Of several annual village events, the two largest are the Crudwell Bike Ride (June), a 24-hour "Le Mans" style event that raises funds for the village hall, in addition to charities that are selected by the bike ride teams, and the Strawberry Fair (July), held on and around the village green. Both take up a weekend and attract visitors from outside the village.

== Notable people ==
In birth order:

- George Ingram (1694–1763), rector from 1719 until his death
- Ambrose McEvoy (1878–1927), artist
- Walter Knight-Adkin (1880–1957), Chaplain of the Fleet
- Richard Cooper (1945–1990), cricketer
- John Rawling Todd (1929–2002), colonial administrator in British Indian Ocean Territory and Hong Kong
