= John Hedges (Malmesbury MP) =

Member of the Parliament of England

John Hedges or Hodges (by 1503 – 12 January 1562), of Malmesbury, Wiltshire, was an English politician.

== Family ==
Hedges married, by 1531, Joan Howell, probably the daughter or widow of John Howell of Somerset. At the time of his death he had a son Thomas and two married daughters, Margaret Ferney and Elizabeth Smith. He also had an illegitimate daughter Joan. His family would later adopt the spelling Hodges.

== Career ==
Hedges was a leading clothier in Malmesbury. He purchased the manor of Shipton Moyne, Gloucestershire in 1544 from Lord Stourton. He subsequently also acquired the manor of Easton Grey, Wilts. He was a Member (MP) of the Parliament of England for Malmesbury in October 1553, April 1554 and November 1554.

He made his will in 1560, asking to be buried in Malmesbury, where he continued to live. He died in January 1562.
