= Richard Stenysham =

Member of the Parliament of England

Richard Stenysham (fl. 1410s) was the member of Parliament for Malmesbury for the parliament of 1415.
