= Thomas Howard, 16th Earl of Suffolk =

British peer and politician

The Right Honourable Thomas Howard FSA
- Earl of Suffolk and Earl of Berkshire
- Thomas Howard, 16th Earl of Suffolk, by Josiah Slater

- Coat of arms
- Tenure: 1820 – 1851
- Predecessor: John Howard, 15th Earl of Suffolk
- Successor: Charles Howard, 17th Earl of Suffolk
- Born: 18 August 1776; Henley-on-Thames
- Died: 4 December 1851 (aged 75)
- Spouse: Hon. Elizabeth Jane Dutton (m. 1803; died 1836)
- Issue: Lady Elizabeth Howard; Charles Howard, 17th Earl of Suffolk; Lady Julia Howard; Hon. Henry Howard; Lady Jane Howard; Hon. John Howard; Hon. Richard Howard; Hon. James Howard; Lady Mary Howard; Lady Frances Howard
- Father: John Howard, 15th Earl of Suffolk

Thomas Howard, 16th Earl of Suffolk, 9th Earl of Berkshire FSA (18 August 1776 – 4 December 1851), styled Viscount Andover from 1800–20, was a British peer and politician from the Howard family.

== Early life ==
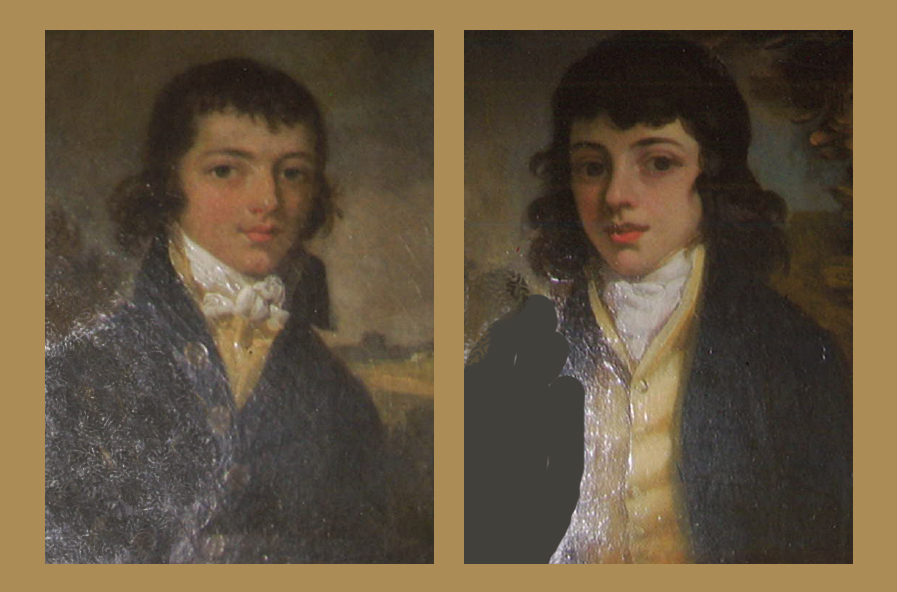
Brothers Charles Nevinson and Thomas Howard

Suffolk was born in Henley-on-Thames, Oxfordshire, the second but eldest surviving son of General John Howard, 15th Earl of Suffolk, and Julia, daughter of John Gaskarth of Hutton Hall, Penrith, Cumberland. He gained the courtesy title Viscount Andover on the death of his elder brother, Charles Nevinson, who was killed in a hunting accident in January 1800.

== Political career ==
Suffolk was Member of Parliament for Arundel from 1802–6. He was appointed Major-Commandant of the Malmesbury Volunteers by commission dated 15 December 1803. In 1820, he succeeded his father in the two united earldoms of Suffolk and Berkshire and entered the House of Lords. In politics, he was a liberal Whig, and he voted for the Reform Act 1832. He was not a protectionist and his chief interest was agriculture.

He served as Colonel of the disembodied Wiltshire Militia from 1827 to 1840.

== Marriage and issue ==
Lord Suffolk married the Hon. Elizabeth Jane, daughter of James Dutton, 1st Baron Sherborne and Elizabeth Coke, in 1803. Elizabeth Jane was a double first cousin to Lady Jane Elizabeth Coke, the former wife of Suffolk's late elder brother, Charles Nevinson Howard, Viscount Andover, and thus the niece of agricultural reformer Thomas William Coke, 1st Earl of Leicester and his wife, Jane Dutton. She died in April 1836, aged 60. They had ten children:

- Lady Elizabeth Howard (6 November 1803 – 20 July 1845), married her first cousin James Dutton, 3rd Baron Sherborne and had issue
- Charles Howard, 17th Earl of Suffolk (7 November 1804 – 14 August 1876), succeeded his father in the earldom
- Lady Julia Catharine Howard (9 June 1806 – 17 February 1875), died unmarried
- Capt. Hon. Henry Thomas Howard (16 November 1808 – 29 January 1851)
- Lady Jane Elizabeth Howard (25 July 1809 – 28 July 1861), married Sir John Ogilvy, 9th Baronet
- Hon. John Howard (4 April 1811 – 14 April 1823), killed in a sporting accident at Charterhouse School, Surrey
- Hon. Richard Edward Howard (29 July 1812 – 27 February 1873), barrister
- Hon. James Kenneth Howard (5 March 1814 – 7 January 1882), married in 1845 Lady Louisa FitzMaurice, daughter of 3rd Marquess of Lansdowne
- Lady Mary Rose Howard (11 September 1815 – 22 May 1874), died unmarried
- Lady Frances Margaret Howard (14 January 1817 – 11 November 1894), died unmarried

Lord Suffolk survived his wife by 15 years and died in December 1851, aged 75. He was succeeded by his eldest son, Charles.

Parliament of the United Kingdom
Preceded by James Greene; Nisbet Balfour	Member of Parliament for Arundel; 1802 – 1806; With: John Atkins	Succeeded by Sir Arthur Piggott; Francis Wilder
Peerage of England
Preceded by John Howard	Earl of Suffolk; 1820 – 1851	Succeeded by Charles John Howard
Preceded by John Howard	Earl of Berkshire; 1820 – 1851	Succeeded by Charles John Howard
