= David Cerney =

16th-century English politician

David Cerney (fl. 1559) was an English politician.

He was a member (MP) of the parliament of England for Malmesbury in 1559.
