= John Forbes (1801–1840) =

John Forbes (1801–1840) was a British director of the East India Company and Member of Parliament.

== Early life ==
He was the eldest son of Sir Charles Forbes, 1st Baronet, and his wife Elizabeth Cotgrave, daughter of Major John Cotgrave of the East India Company service, and may have been born in India. By 1809 he was being educated in the United Kingdom. In 1811 his father took up residence at Castle Newe, Aberdeenshire. He matriculated at Magdalen College, Oxford in 1819.

His father's uncle and business partner, John Forbes (1743–1821) known as "Bombay Jock", had in 1767 formed Forbes & Co., trading at Bombay (now Mumbai) with significant involvement of Parsi merchants. His father put 20% of his inheritance from "Bombay Jock" in or soon after 1821 towards purchasing East India Company stock for John, who then had a vote in the company's affairs. When John turned 21, a party was held, and a cairn made on Lonach Hill in the Strathdon area in 1822, to celebrate. Further commemoration from 1823 led to the traditions of the Lonach Gathering.

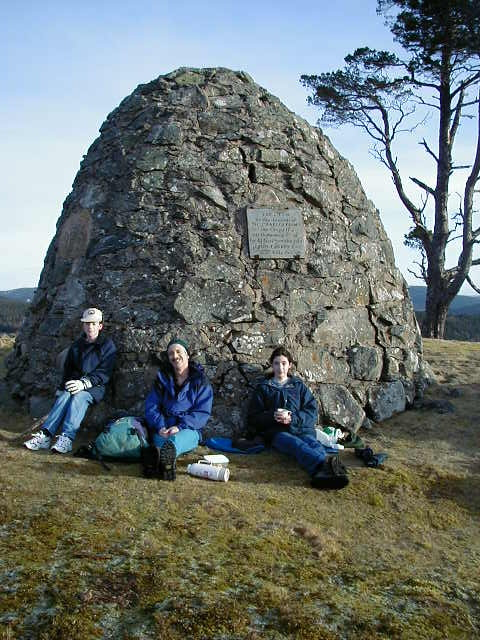
Cairn on Lonach Hill, Aberdeenshire, commemorating the 21st birthday of John Forbes (1801–1840)

== In politics ==
His father Charles, a baronet from 1823, became Member of Parliament in 1818 for Malmesbury, a constituency controlled by Joseph Pitt. For the 1826 general election, Sir Charles bought the second seat in the two-member constituency from Pitt, for John Forbes.

Forbes did not speak in Parliament, but generally supported the Liverpool ministry and its Tory successors. He did however vote in favour of measures for Catholic emancipation. He married in 1828 Jane Mary Hunter, daughter of Henry Lannoy Hunter. He was an MP to 1832 and the Great Reform Act, after which he dropped out of politics.

== Later life ==
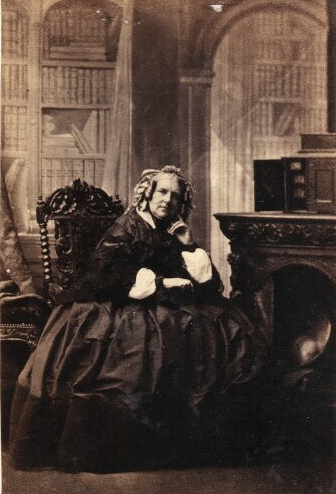
Mary Jane Forbes, 1861 photograph

A sufferer from tuberculosis, Forbes with his wife had a family of one son and five daughters, all of whom were affected by the disease. He died before his father, and his son later became Sir Charles Forbes, 2nd Baronet.
