= Alexander Oxenford =

English politician

Alexander Oxenford (fl. 1386–1388) was an English politician.

He was a member (MP) of the parliament of England for Malmesbury in 1386 and February 1388.
