= William Palmer (Malmesbury MP) =

Member of the Parliament of England

William Palmer (fl. early 1400s) was the member of Parliament for Malmesbury for multiple parliaments from 1417 to 1437. He was described in The History of Parliament (1993) as "virtually monopolized one of the Malmesbury seats during that period."
