= Robert Grahame of Whitehill =

Scottish lawyer

Robert Grahame of Whitehill (1759–1851) was an 18th/19th century Scottish lawyer who served as Lord Provost of Glasgow 1833 to 1834.

== Life ==
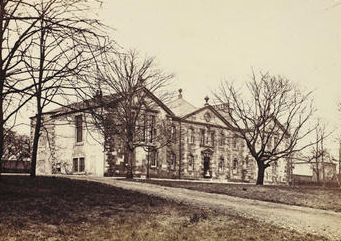
Whitehill House north-east of Glasgow

He was born in Glasgow in 1759 the son of Thomas Grahame a lawyer (d.1791) and trained as a lawyer.

Around 1797 he purchased Whitehill House, from John Gordon but previously the home of John Glassford (who built the mansion).

In 1820 he was living at 52 Miller Street with his office next door at 51 Miller Street.

He was elected Lord Provost of Glasgow in 1833 in Succession to James Ewing of Strathleven and was succeeded by William Mills in 1834. By 1835 he was living on the Whitehill estate with his wife and children and with his parents. His father is listed as partner in the legal firm of Mitchell, Grahame & Mitchell and he presumed to be in the same company.

He sold Whitehill House to the Glasgow merchant John Reid around 1845 and moved to England.

He died on 28 December 1851 in Hatton Hall near Wellingborough.

After Grahame's death, Whitehill House was later bought by Alexander Dennistoun, whose name now survives in the area where the house stood; Dennistoun. It is remembered in the street name Whitehill Street.

== Family ==
He married Helen Geddes, and they had two sons and two daughters. His son Thomas married Hannah Finlay, daughter of Kirkman Finlay.

== Artistic representation ==
His portrait was painted by Chester Harding. The portrait is held in the Glasgow Resource Centre.

His wife Helen was portrayed by Sir Henry Raeburn.
