= Jack Tanner =

Jack Tanner may refer to:

- Jack Tanner, a fictional presidential candidate in the mockumentary, Tanner '88
- Jack Edward Tanner, United States federal judge
- Jack Tanner (trade unionist), British trade union leader and syndicalist activist
- Jack Tanner, a fictional British soldier during World War II, in a book series by James Holland.

== See also ==
- John Tanner (disambiguation)
