= John Charlton (MP) =

English politician in the 1400s

John Charlton (fl. early 1400s) was the member of Parliament for Malmesbury for the parliaments of 1406, April 1414, and 1420.
