= Matthew King (Malmesbury MP) =

16th-century English politician

Matthew King (by 1520 – 1566 or later), of Malmesbury, Wiltshire, was an English politician.

He was a member (MP) of the parliament of England for Malmesbury in October 1553, April 1554, 1555 and 1558.
