= William Stumpe =

16th-century English politician

William Stumpe (by 1498 – 22 July 1552) of Malmesbury, Wiltshire, was a clothier, Sheriff of Wiltshire, and a member of parliament.

== Career ==
Stumpe was a leading Wiltshire clothier and one of England's most successful merchants in the time of Henry VIII. Having made his fortune as a producer of woollen cloth, Stumpe bought the Malmesbury Abbey estate when the monastery was dissolved in 1539. He gave the nave of the Abbey church to the town as a parish church and filled the other monastic buildings with weaving looms. He probably began to build Abbey House in the 1540s.

Stumpe was also a Member of the Parliament of England for Malmesbury in 1529 and 1547. He was appointed as Sheriff of Wiltshire for 1551 and was still in office when he died in 1552.

== Family ==
Stumpe married, by 1519, Joyce Berkeley, daughter of James Berkeley of Bradley, Gloucestershire. They had two sons, James and John Stumpe. His second wife was Tibbalda, the widow of William Billing of Deddington, Oxfordshire, who had died 28 August 1533. In 1551, Stumpe married thirdly Catherine, the widow of Richard Mody of Garsdon, Wiltshire, who had died 8 November 1550.

His eldest son, James Stumpe, was also appointed and Sheriff and elected as a Member of Parliament. After inheriting his father's huge fortune in 1552, he continued the building of Abbey House.
