= Thomas Luce (British politician) =

Member of Parliament for Malmesbury
- In office 8 July 1852 – 29 April 1859
- Preceded by: James Howard
- Succeeded by: Henry Howard

Personal details
- Born: 1790
- Died: 6 August 1875 (aged 85)
- Party: Whig

Thomas Luce (1790 – 6 August 1875) was a British Whig politician.

Luce was first elected Whig MP for Malmesbury during the 1852 general election and held the seat until 1859 when he did not run in that year's general election.

Parliament of the United Kingdom
Preceded by James Howard	Member of Parliament for Malmesbury; 1852–1859	Succeeded by Henry Howard
