= Siege of IJsseloord =

1585 siege

- Part of Eighty Years' War and the Anglo-Spanish War (1585–1604)
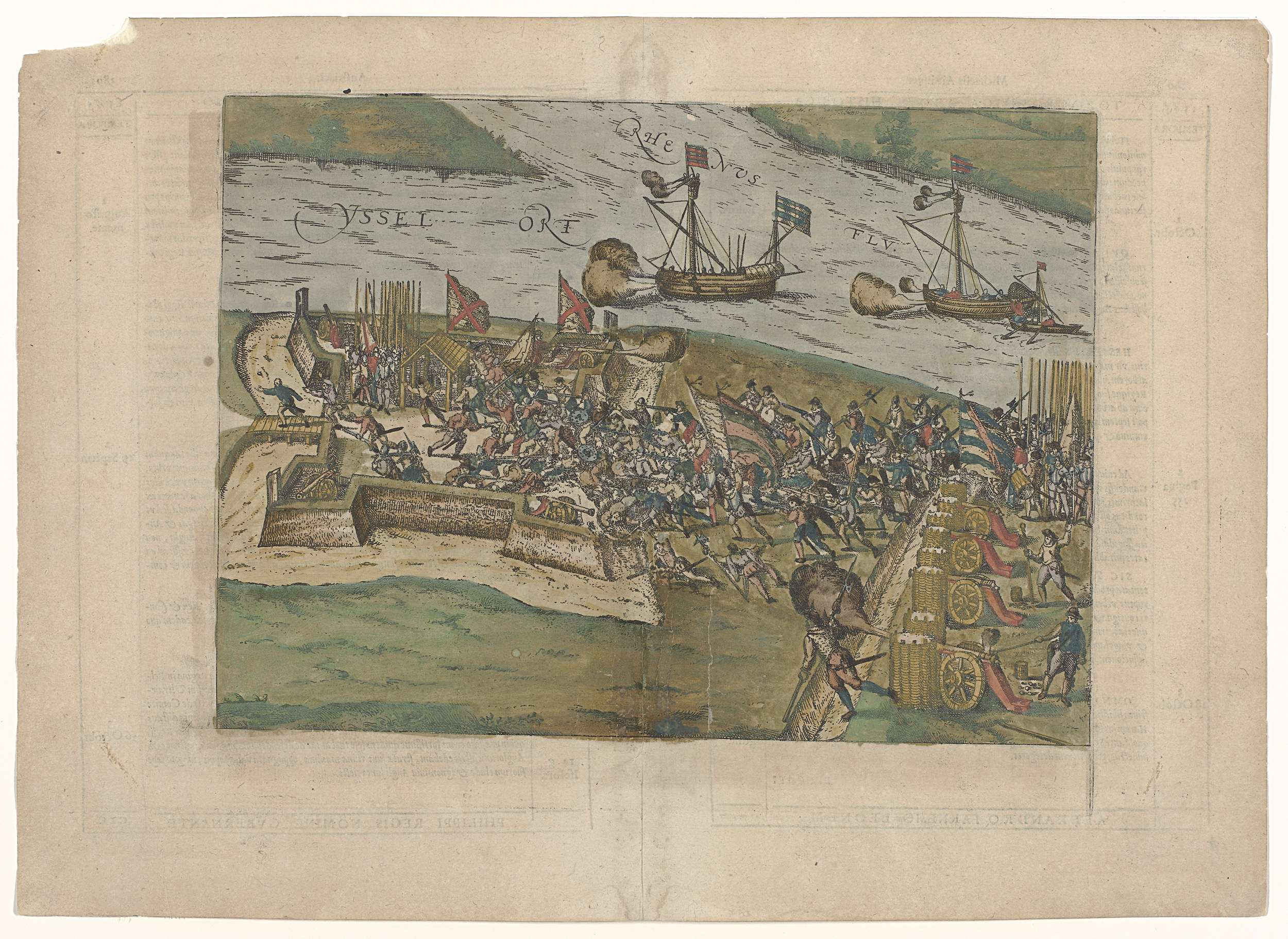
- Dutch depiction of the siege of IJsseloord
Date	6 and 15 October 1585
Location	Present day Arnhem, Netherlands 51.972219°N 5.953522°E
Result	Dutch-English victory

Belligerents
(Dutch Republic) States-General; England	Spain

Commanders and leaders
(Dutch Republic) Adolf Nieuwenaar (England) John Norreys	(Spain) Francisco Verdugo

Strength
3,000	Unknown

The siege of IJsseloord or the capture of Arnhem was a siege that took place between the 6 and 15 October 1585 at Arnhem (Gelderland in the Netherlands) during the Eighty Years' War and the Anglo-Spanish War (1585–1604). The Dutch and English were victorious when the sconce of IJsseloord after seven days capitulated and Arnhem fell into their hands.

The English under Queen Elizabeth I had just signed the treaty of Nonsuch in August and as such the English contingent was enlarged and put under temporary command of John Norreys. After crossing the English Channel they joined the States troops of Adolf van Nieuwenaar then headed towards Arnhem with 2,500 men where they intended to retake a sconce called IJsseloord. In the 16th century IJsseloord was a point that connected the Rhine and the IJssel and as such it was a strategic point running towards Zutphen and Deventer.

== Siege ==
In 1585, the Spanish commander Francisco Verdugo had taken the sconce, so Adolf van Nieuwenaar with John Norreys appeared on 6 October that year with eighteen companies of English and German soldiers that soon surrounded the area and began their siege. Almost immediately the besiegers began a bombardment with nine guns from two directions from the sides of Betuwe and the forested hill of Veluwe. However, the besieged recovered quickly from this shelling and managed to repel an attack killing Captain Willem van Doorn but the Spanish success was short-lived.

On 15 October the Dutch and English had received reinforcements of three ships which included 500 soldiers. They bombarded the sconce again and left two ships adrift, to cause some distraction and it was here Thomas Vavasour distinguished himself. When the besiegers were preparing for an assault, the Spaniards realized that their position was hopeless and decided to negotiate a surrender to which Nieuwenaar and Norreys agreed. Francisco Verdrugo managed to get near the siege positions hoping to save the situation but it was too late and with the siege over the Spanish garrison were allowed to leave with their colors, arms, and full armor.

With the sconce captured Arnhem ultimately fell into the Dutch and English hands and the following day the magistrate of Arnhem donated Nieuwenaar a silver chalice for the service rendered. Norreys however continued forward despite the weather and headed towards Nijmegen with no more than 3,000 men but Alexander Farnese, the Duke of Parma, intercepted him with 9,000 infantry and eight or nine cornets of cavalry, hence Norreys was forced to withdraw then both returned to winter quarters.

The sconce remained in Dutch hands until August 1626 when Count Van den Bergh took it again for Spain after his failed attempt at relief during the siege of 's-Hertogenbosch. Today the sconce at Arnhem is in ruins and very little remains as a main road and rail line intercede it.
