= James Stumpe =

16th-century English politician

Sir James Stumpe (by 1519 – 29 April 1563), of Malmesbury and Bromham, Wiltshire, was an English clothier and Member of Parliament.

He was the eldest son of wealthy clothier and MP, William Stumpe. He was knighted in 1549 or later and succeeded his father in 1552. He took over as High Sheriff of Wiltshire in 1552 on the death in office of his father. He was elected a Member (MP) of the Parliament of England for Wiltshire in March 1553 and for Malmesbury in 1555. He served again as High Sheriff of Wiltshire in 1560–61. Among other lands, Stumpe owned the manors of Charlton and Hankerton, the latter purchased in 1553.

He married twice: firstly Bridget, the daughter of Sir Edward Bayntun (or Baynton) of Bromham, with whom he had a daughter, Elizabeth (who married Henry Knyvet); secondly, in 1545, he married Isabel, a daughter of Sir Ralph Leigh of Stockwell, Surrey, and Joyce Culpeper, a half-sister of Queen Catherine Howard, and the widow of Sir Edward Bayntun. Stumpe died a rich man; his estate was shared by his widow and daughter.
