= Robert Miles (cricketer) =

English amateur cricketer (1846–1930)

Robert Fenton Miles (24 January 1846 – 26 February 1930) was an English amateur cricketer who played first-class cricket from 1867 to 1879 for Oxford University and Gloucestershire County Cricket Club. He was a right-handed batsman and a slow left arm orthodox bowler who made 69 first-class career appearances. Miles scored 577 runs with a highest score of 79. He took 217 wickets with a best bowling analysis of 7/38. He took five wickets in an innings on 15 occasions and twice took ten wickets in a match.
