= Thomas Edgar (MP) =

16th-century English politician

Thomas Edgar (by 1508–1547), of Blewbury, Berkshire; Bermondsey, Surrey and London, was an English politician.

He was a member (MP) of the parliament of England for Malmesbury in 1529.
