= Landguard Manor =

Manor house in Shanklin, Isle of Wight, England

- Location within Isle of Wight

General information
- Location: Shanklin, Isle of Wight, England
- Coordinates: 50°38′18″N 1°10′53″W

Landguard Manor (or Languard) is a manor house in Shanklin on the Isle of Wight, England. First mentioned, as 'Langrad', in 1255, the place-name means 'the long reed-bed'. Over the centuries the house was home to numerous notable gentlemen. It is a Grade II listed building. One of the finest known portraits by Sir Thomas Lawrence, English portrait painter and president of the Royal Academy, is located in its drawing room.

== Geography ==
The house is located off Landguard Manor Road, about 0.66 miles (1.06 km) north of the town centre. Nearby is Landguard Camping Park, Lake Common, and well as the Shanklin Cemetery which contains the HMS Eurydice memorial honouring the sailors who died in the area in 1878 during one of Britain's worst peace-time naval disasters.

== History ==
The idea that the Landguard estate was recorded in the Domesday Book is a mistake, since the place-name in question, 'Leuegarestun', refers to Loverston Farm in another part of the island.

Landguard is an ancient manor house that later became a farmhouse before another manor home was built at the site in the mid to late 19th century.

Landguard is not to be identified with the Levegarestun of Domesday Book, which was in the wrong part of the island and can be identified as Loverston Farm near Chillerton. Landguard was in the honour of Carisbrooke Castle in the 13th and 14th centuries, but was said in 1582 to be held of the manor of Wolverton. In the latter half of the 13th century it was held with Wolverton by Robert de Glamorgan, but had perhaps previously been held by Geoffrey Tichborne, who had given land in Landguard to the chaplains of Limerstone. It appears to have passed with Wolverton until 1431. At the beginning of the 16th century the manors of Landguard and Watchingwell were held by Thomas Baker and his wife Joan, and came to their daughter Joan wife of John Earlisman, on whose death in 1542 the property was divided between her two daughters, Landguard being assigned to Jane, the wife of Edward Hungerford. After her husband's death Jane married Edward Moore, and the two in June 1572 granted 'the site and capital messuage and farm-place of the manor of Langorde' to Richard Cooke of Chale for the term of 100 years. Edward Moore and Jane remained in possession until 1574, but they probably left no issue, as the manor passed to John Cheke, probably son of Jane's sister Joan Cheke. John died seised of it, then called the manor of North Landguard, in 1582, leaving a son Edward. This estate afterwards seems to have passed to Sir John Richards, who died seised of it in 1626, leaving a son John.

The English numismatist and antiquarian Charles Roach Smith was born at Landguard Manor in 1807.

The later manor-house was erected by Colonel Francis Henry Atherley (1831–1897) on the site of the older one. His wife, Lady Isabella Julia Elizabeth Howard (c. 1843–1910), was the daughter of Charles Howard, 17th Earl of Suffolk. Their son, Arthur Harry Howard Atherley was born at the manor house in 1865. Landguard Manor was the constant host to Riflemen of the 60th Rifles and Rifle Brigade.

== Architecture and fittings ==
The south facing building was built in the late 18th century. It was extended in 1878 and remodelled in 1906. The original front of the building has five bays, constructed of brick, and featuring stone quoins. Currently, the main frontage is the former east side of the 1878 extension. The irregular facade is of stone and for the most part is Neo-Jacobean. There is a large balustraded porch, probably part of the 1906 addition, with multiple round arches. Some of the internal features include a two-tiered colonnaded hall, a well staircase, and a wing with an arched loggia. In 1995 the house was designated a Grade II listed building.

== Flora and fauna ==
Flora around the manor includes Lesser Dodder, Purple Broomrape, Northern Hard Fern, Savi's Club Rush. A Hoopoe was recorded near the manor in 1897.
