= Charles William Miles =

English politician

Charles William Miles (1823 – 1892) was an English Conservative politician who sat in the House of Commons from 1882 to 1885.

Miles was elected member of parliament (MP) for Malmesbury, Wiltshire in the 1882 by-election. This was after the former MP, Walter Powell, had disappeared and was presumed dead from a balloon accident.

Miles was the son of Philip John Miles, MP, by his second wife Clarissa Peach. He married Maria Susanna Hill, daughter of Jeremiah Hill, on 14th April 1853 and had six children.

- Colonel Charles Napier Miles (1854 - 1918), Army officer and cricketer
- Audley Charles Miles (1855 - 1919), father of Admiral Sir Geoffrey Miles
- Vivien Charles Miles (1857 - )
- Clarissa Miles (1860 - )
- Mary Miles (1862 - 1937)
- Marguerite Agaranthe Miles (1869 - 1943) who married Sir Charles Tennant, Bt
