= John Stowell (MP) =

Member of the Parliament of England

John Stowell (fl. 1369–1402) was an English merchant and the member of Parliament for Malmesbury for multiple parliaments from 1369 to September 1397.

He was tax collector for Wiltshire in March 1395.
