= Nicholas Weston (MP for Malmesbury) =

Member of the Parliament of England

Nicholas Weston (fl. 1373–1383) of Malmesbury, Wiltshire, England, was a politician.

== Family ==
Weston was married with two daughters. Their names are unrecorded.

== Career ==
He was a member (MP) of the parliament of England for Malmesbury in 1373, May 1382, October 1382, February 1383, October 1383, November 1384, 1385 and 1386.
