= John Randolf (MP) =

Member of the Parliament of England

John Randolf (fl. 1410s) was the member of Parliament for Malmesbury for the parliament of April 1414.
