= John B. Randolph =

American politician (1918–1983)

Member of the Wyoming House of Representatives from the Fremont County district
- In office January 11, 1983 – October 18, 1983 Serving with Mary Odde, Scott Ratliff, Harry Tipton, Dale Urbigkit
- Succeeded by: Bob Baker

Personal details
- Born: John Beverly Randolph; May 5, 1918 Raleigh, Iowa, U.S.
- Died: October 18, 1983 (aged 65) Dubois, Wyoming, U.S.
- Cause of death: Heart attack
- Party: Republican
- Spouse: Bess Hackler (m. 1964)
- Children: 4
- Education: Minneapolis Central High School; University of Minnesota (BBA)
- Profession: Politician, rancher, businessman

Military service
- Allegiance: United States
- Branch/service: United States Army Air Forces
- Rank: Captain
- Battles/wars: World War II

John Beverly Randolph (May 5, 1918 – October 18, 1983) was an American politician, rancher, and businessman who served in the Wyoming House of Representatives, representing Fremont County as a Republican in 1983 until his death later that year.

== Early life and education ==
Randolph was born in Raleigh, Iowa, on May 5, 1918. He graduated from Minneapolis Central High School in 1936 and obtained a Bachelor of Business Administration from the University of Minnesota in 1941.

== Career ==
Randolph served in the United States Army Air Forces during World War II and became a captain. Prior to entering politics, he was a rancher and business executive.

=== 1982 election ===
In 1982, Randolph was elected to the Wyoming House of Representatives to represent Fremont County as a Republican in the 47th Wyoming Legislature. Randolph assumed office in 1983 and served until his death later that same year. (Note: According to the Wyoming Legislature, Randolph died in 1984.)

During his time in office, Randolph served on the following standing committees:

- Corporations, Elections and Political Subdivisions
- Travel, Recreation and Wildlife

On November 8, 1983, Republican Bob Baker was appointed to serve out the remainder of Randolph's term.

== Personal life and death ==
On June 5, 1964, Randolph married Bess Hackler in Dallas, Texas, with whom he had four children.

Randolph died of a heart attack at the age of 65 in Dubois, Wyoming, on October 18, 1983. He is buried at Dubois Cemetery, Dubois, Wyoming.

== Notes ==
Wyoming House of Representatives
Preceded by —	Member of the Wyoming House of Representatives from the Fremont County district 1983–1983; Served alongside: Mary Odde, Scott Ratliff, Harry Tipton, Dale Urbigkit	Succeeded by Bob Baker
