= William Chaloner (MP) =

14th-century English politician

William Chaloner (fl. 1390s) was member of Parliament for Malmesbury for the parliament of 1393.
