= Henry Bayly (MP for Malmesbury) =

16th-century English politician and barrister

Henry Bayly (born c. 1564) was a barrister of Lincoln's Inn and the member of the Parliament of England for Malmesbury for the parliaments of 1586 and 1589.
