= John Tanner (MP) =

Member of the Parliament of England

John Tanner (fl. c. 1400) was the member of Parliament for Malmesbury for the parliament of 1402.
