= Henry Knyvet =

English landowner and Member of Parliament (c. 1537–1598)

- Born: 1537
- Died: 1598 (aged 60–61)
- Occupation: Member of Parliament
- Known for: Charlton House
- Relatives: Thomas Knyvett (grandfather); Henry Knyvet (father); Thomas Knyvet (brother); Catherine Howard (daughter); Elizabeth Clinton (daughter); Anthony Knivet (son)

Sir Henry Knyvet (c. 1537–1598) of Charlton Park, Wiltshire, was an English landowner who was Member of Parliament (MP) for Wootton Bassett in 1571 and 1572, for Malmesbury in 1584 and 1586, Wootton Bassett again in 1589 and Malmesbury again in 1593 and 1597. He began the building of Charlton House in Charlton Park.

== Early life and family ==
Knyvet was the eldest son of Henry Knyvet and his wife Anne, daughter and heiress of Christopher Pickering of Killington, Cumbria, and widow of Francis Weston. The younger Knyvet was born around 1537. Knyvet was the grandson of Thomas Knyvett (d. 1512) and the brother of Thomas Knyvet, 1st Baron Knyvet. He succeeded his father in 1546.

== Career ==
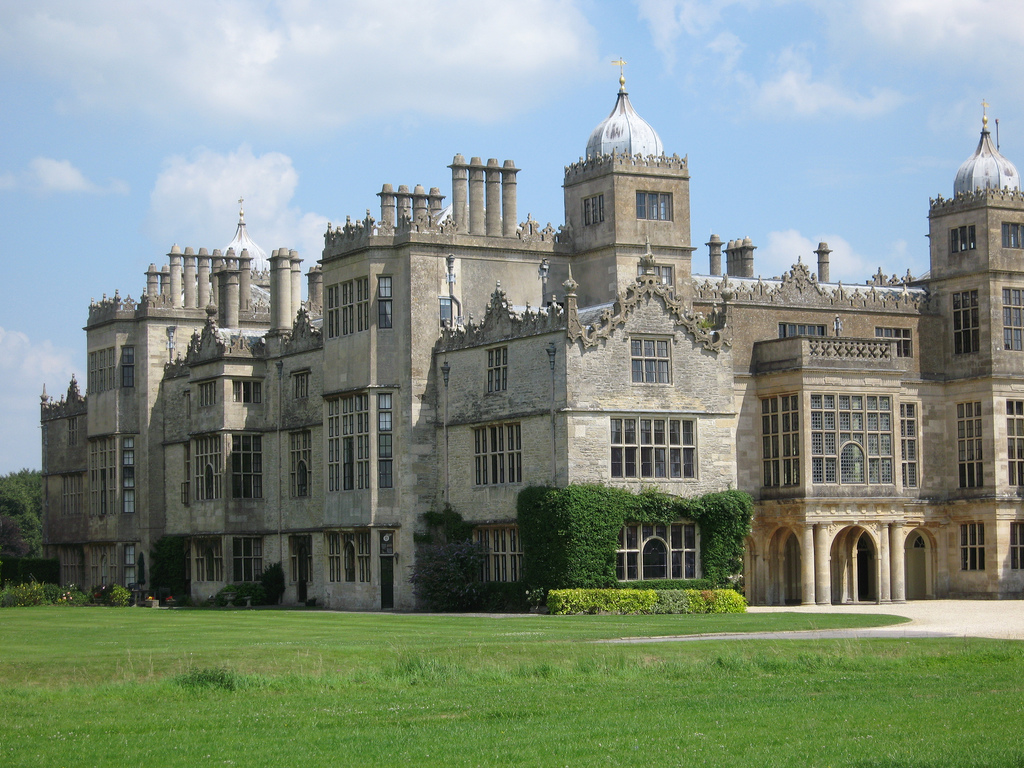
Charlton House, near Malmesbury, Wiltshire

Knyvet held a number of public offices and was appointed High Sheriff of Wiltshire (1578–79) and a deputy-lieutenant of Wiltshire. He was elected Member of Parliament (MP) for Wootton Bassett in 1571 and 1572, for Malmesbury in 1584 and 1586, Wootton Bassett again in 1589 and finally Malmesbury again in 1593 and 1597. He was knighted in September 1574.

Knyvet first married Elizabeth, the daughter and sole heiress of James Stumpe of Malmesbury, with whom he had two sons and four daughters. She brought him the manor of Charlton Park, where he commenced the building of Charlton House.

Knyvet's second wife was Mary, the daughter of John Sydenham of Brinton, Somerset, and the widow of John Fitz of Fitzford, Devon.

== Death and legacy ==
Knyvet died in 1598, and was buried on 25 July 1598. He was succeeded by his surviving three daughters, Catherine (who inherited Charlton Park and eventually became Countess of Suffolk), Elizabeth, and Frances. Catherine extended and enlarged the house, which is today a Grade I listed building.

Knyvet also had an illegitimate son, Anthony Knyvet, a pirate, slave, and slave trader.
