= Charlton, Brinkworth =

Village and civil parish in Wiltshire, England

Coordinates: 51.599°N 2.056°W

Charlton
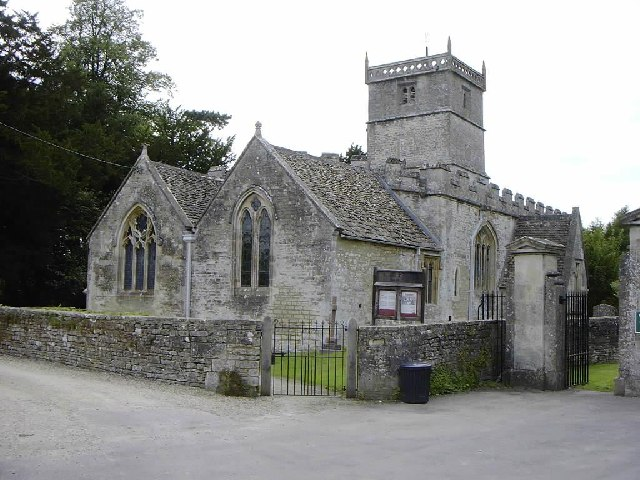
- St John the Baptist parish church

- Location within Wiltshire
- Population: 425 (2011 Census)
- OS grid reference: ST962889
- Civil parish: Charlton (Brinkworth)
- Unitary authority: Wiltshire
- Ceremonial county: Wiltshire
- Region: South West
- Country: England
- Sovereign state: United Kingdom
- Post town: Malmesbury
- Postcode district: SN16
- Dialling code: 01666
- Police: Wiltshire
- Fire: Dorset and Wiltshire
- Ambulance: South Western
- UK Parliament: South Cotswolds
- Website: Parish Council

Charlton is a village and civil parish in North Wiltshire, England, about 2 miles (3 km) northeast of Malmesbury and 4 miles (6.4 km) northwest of the village of Brinkworth. The parish includes the hamlet of Perry Green and the Charlton Park estate. The 2011 Census recorded the parish population as 425.

The name Charlton derives from the Old English ceorltūn meaning 'churl's settlement'.

== Manor ==
Two Anglo Saxon charters and the Domesday Book of 1086 record land in the parish. Malmesbury Abbey held the manor.

== Parish church ==
The oldest parts of the Church of England parish church of St John the Baptist include the north arcade, which is late 12th-century. The west tower and north chapel were added in the 13th century. Several new windows were inserted in the 15th century. The Jacobean pulpit was made in 1630, and the tower screen may be of a similar date. Inside the church is a canopied monument to Sir Henry Knyvett, who died in 1598. The church is a Grade II* listed building. The parish is now part of the Benefice of Garsdon, Lea and Cleverton, and Charlton, although the church is served by the Braydon Brook team ministry.

The tower has a ring of six bells. Abraham I Rudhall of Gloucester cast the third, fourth and tenor bells in 1712. John Rudhall cast the fifth bell in 1805. John Taylor & Co of Loughborough cast the treble and second in 1999.

== Bibliography ==
- Baggs, A. P.; Freeman, Jane; Stevenson, Janet H. (1991). "Parishes: Charlton". In Crowley, D. A. (ed.). A History of the County of Wiltshire, Volume 14. Victoria County History. University of London. pp. 36–50 – via British History Online.
- Crowley, Douglas, ed. (2009). The Court Records of Brinkworth and Charlton, 1544–1648. Vol. 61. Wiltshire Record Society.
- Pevsner, Nikolaus; Cherry, Bridget (revision) (1975) [1963]. Wiltshire. The Buildings of England (2nd ed.). Harmondsworth: Penguin Books. pp. 162–164. ISBN 0-14-0710-26-4.
