= John Stumpe =

16th-century English politician

John Stumpe (c. 1525 – 3 May 1600) was the member of the Parliament of England for Malmesbury for the parliament of 1584.
