= Castle Newe =

Castle in Aberdeenshire, Scotland

Coordinates: 57°11′49″N 3°01′51″W

Castle Newe was a castellated mansion house, situated in Aberdeenshire, and designed in 1831 by Archibald Simpson. It was based on an existing Z-plan castle from 1604, which had square towers and was similar to Glenbuchat Castle. It was built by William Leslie of Nethermuir.

The castle was demolished in 1927 and the stone used to build Elphinstone Hall, University of Aberdeen. The former coach house is now known as the House of Newe, and contains furniture from the castle. It was a property of the Clan Forbes.
