= Philip Miles (cricketer) =

English cricketer and army officer

Philip William Herbert Miles (7 January 1848 – 4 December 1933) was an English army officer and first-class cricketer.

== Life ==
He was born in Bingham, the son of Robert Henry William Miles (1818–1883), its rector, who was the son of Philip John Miles. His mother was Mary Ellin Cleaver, who married Miles in 1844 and had with him a family of six sons and four daughters. She was the daughter of James Jarvis Cleaver, and this was a marriage of cousins. The sixth son was Frank Miles.

Philip Miles was educated at Marlborough College, and was nominated in 1867 to Woolwich College. In 1869 he became a lieutenant in the Royal Artillery.

Miles died in Bude.

== Cricket career ==
Active 1868–77, Miles played for Nottinghamshire.
