= Malmesbury (UK Parliament constituency) =

Parliamentary constituency in the United Kingdom, 1832–1885

- Former borough constituency for the House of Commons

1275–1885
- Seats: two (1295–1832); one (1832–1885)
- Replaced by: Chippenham

Malmesbury was a parliamentary borough in Wiltshire, which elected two Members of Parliament (MPs) to the House of Commons from 1275 until 1832, and then one member from 1832 until 1885, when the borough was abolished.

== History ==
The borough was represented in Parliament from 1275. The constituency originally returned two members, but representation was reduced to one in the Great Reform Act 1832 until the constituency was finally abolished in 1885.

In the 17th century the constituency was dominated by the Earls of Suffolk, based in the family seat at nearby Charlton Park.

== Members of Parliament ==
=== MPs 1275–1508 ===
From History of Parliament

Parliament	First member	Second member
1386	Nicholas Weston	Alexander Oxenford
1388 (Feb)	John Parker	Alexander Oxenford
1388 (Sep)		
1390 (Jan)	John Parker	William Blankpayn
1390 (Nov)		
1391		
1393	William Blankpayn	William Chaloner
1394	Richard Parker	William Blankpayn
1395	Nicholas Sambourn	Thomas Froud
1397 (Jan)	Robert Newman	William Blankpayn
1397 (Sep)	John Stowell	William Blankpayn
1399	Robert Newman	Robert Salman
1401		
1402	John Tanner	Thomas Bonde
1404 (Jan)		
1404 (Oct)		
1406	Thomas Hyweye	John Charlton
1407		
1410		
1411		
1413 (Feb)		
1413 (May)		
1414 (Apr)	John Charlton	John Randolf
1414 (Nov)	Thomas Hyweye	John Gore
1415	Thomas Hyweye	Richard Stenysham
1416 (Mar)	John Gore	Thomas Corbyn
1416 (Oct)		
1417	William Palmer	Thomas Corbyn
1419	William Palmer	
1420	William Palmer	John Charlton
1421 (May)	William Palmer	
1421 (Dec)	William Palmer	John Gore

=== MPs 1509–1558 ===
(Source: Bindoff (1982))

Parliament	First member	Second member
Parliament of 1510–23	No names known	No names known
Parliament of 1529	Thomas Edgar	William Stumpe
Parliament of 1536	Not known	Not known
Parliament of 1539	Not known	Not known
Parliament of 1542	Not known	Not known
Parliament of 1545	Not known	Not known
Parliament of 1547	Sir Maurice Denys	William Stumpe
Parliament of 1553(Mar)	Not known	Not known
Parliament of 1553(Oct)	John Hedges	Matthew King
Parliament of 1554(Apr)	John Hedges	Matthew King
Parliament of 1554(Nov)	Edward Unton	John Hedges
Parliament of 1555	Sir James Stumpe	Matthew King
Parliament of 1558	Matthew King	Griffin Curteys

=== MPs 1559–1603 ===
Source:History of Parliament

Parliament	First member	Second member
1559	Lawrence Hyde (died 1590)	David Cerney
1562–3	Sir Thomas Ragland	Edward Poole
1571	Nicholas Snell	Ambrose Button
1572	John Danvers	Nicholas Snell, died and repl. Jan 1562 by Henry Baynton
1584	Sir Henry Knyvet	John Stumpe
1586	Sir Henry Knyvet	Henry Bayly
1589	Thomas Vavasour	Henry Bayly
1593	Sir Henry Knyvet	Thomas Lake
1597	Sir Henry Knyvet	Thomas Estcourt
1601	Sir William Monson	Sidney Montagu

=== MPs 1604–1640 ===
Parliament	First member	Second member
Parliament of 1604–1611	Sir Roger Dallison	Sir Thomas Dallison
Parliament of 1614–1621	Sir Roger Dallison	Sir Neville Poole
Parliament of 1621–1622	Sir Henry Poole	Sir Edward Wardour
Parliament of 1624–1625	Sir Edward Wardour	Thomas Hatton
Parliament of 1625–1626	Sir Henry Moody, Bt	Sir Edward Wardour
Parliament of 1626–1628	Sir Henry Moody, Bt	Sir William Croft
Parliament of 1628–1629	Sir Henry Moody, Bt	Sir William Croft
1629–1640	No Parliaments convened	

=== MPs 1640–1832 ===
Year	First member	First party	Second member	Second party
April 1640	Anthony Hungerford	Royalist	Sir Neville Poole	
November 1640	Anthony Hungerford	Royalist	Sir Neville Poole	Parliamentarian
June 1644	Hungerford disabled from sitting – seat vacant		Sir Neville Poole	Parliamentarian
1645	Sir John Danvers		Sir Neville Poole	Parliamentarian
December 1648	Sir John Danvers		Poole excluded in Pride's Purge – seat vacant	
1653	Malmesbury was unrepresented in the Barebones Parliament and the First and Second Parliaments of the Protectorate			
January 1659	Sir Henry Lee		Thomas Higgons	
May 1659	Malmesbury was not represented in the restored Rump			
April 1660	Robert Danvers		Sir Francis Lee, Bt	
1661	Lawrence Washington		Sir Francis Lee, Bt	
1662	Philip Howard		Sir Francis Lee, Bt	
1668	Philip Howard		Sir Edward Poole	
1673	Philip Howard		Thomas Estcourt	
February 1679	Sir William Estcourt, Bt		Sir James Long, Bt	
1685	Sir Thomas Estcourt		John Fitzherbert	
1689	Thomas Tollemache		Charles Godfrey	
1690	Goodwin Wharton		Sir James Long, Bt	
1692	Goodwin Wharton		George Booth	
1695	Goodwin Wharton		Craven Howard	
1696	Sir Thomas Skipwith, Bt		Craven Howard	
1698	Michael Wicks		Edward Pauncefort	
January 1701	Samuel Shepheard		Edward Pauncefort	
November 1701	Sir Charles Hedges		Edward Pauncefort	
1702	Thomas Boucher		Edward Pauncefort	
1705	Thomas Farrington		Henry Mordaunt	
1710	Thomas Farrington		Joseph Addison	Whig
1713	Sir John Rushout, Bt		Joseph Addison	Whig
1719 by-election	Sir John Rushout, Bt		Fleetwood Dormer	
March 1722	Sir John Rushout, Bt		The Viscount Hillsborough	
December 1722	Giles Earle		John Fermor	
1723 by-election	Giles Earle		Charles Stewart	
1727	Giles Earle		William Rawlinson Earle	
1747	John Lee		James Douglas	
1751 by-election	John Lee		Lord Edward Digby	
1754	Lord George Bentinck		Brice Fisher	
1759 by-election	Thomas Conolly		Brice Fisher	
1761	Thomas Conolly		The Earl Tylney	
1768	The Earl of Donegall		Hon. Thomas Howard	
1774	Hon. Charles James Fox	Whig	William Strahan	Tory
September 1780	Viscount Lewisham		Viscount Fairford	
November 1780 by-election	John Calvert		Viscount Fairford	
1784	The Viscount Melbourne		Viscount Maitland	
February 1790 by-election	The Viscount Melbourne		Paul Benfield	
June 1790	Benjamin Bond-Hopkins		Paul Benfield	
1792 by-election	Benjamin Bond-Hopkins		Sir James Sanderson	
1794 by-election	Francis Glanville		Sir James Sanderson	
May 1796	Samuel Smith		Peter Thellusson	
November 1796 by-election	Philip Metcalfe		Peter Thellusson	
1802	Claude Scott		Sir Samuel Scott, Bt	
1806	Robert Ladbroke		Nicholas Ridley-Colborne	
1807	Sir George Bowyer, Bt	Tory	Philip Gell	Tory
1810 by-election	Abel Smith	Tory	Philip Gell	Tory
1812	William Hicks-Beach	Tory	Sir Charles Saxton, Bt	Tory
1813 by-election	William Hicks-Beach	Tory	Peter Patten	Tory
1817 by-election	Sir William Abdy, Bt		Peter Patten	Tory
1818	(Sir) Charles Forbes	Tory	Kirkman Finlay	Tory
1820 by-election	(Sir) Charles Forbes	Tory	William Leake	
1826	(Sir) Charles Forbes	Tory	John Forbes	Tory
1832	Representation reduced to one member			

=== MPs 1832–1885 ===
Election	Member	Party
1832	Charles Howard	Whig
1841	Hon. James Howard	Whig
1852	Thomas Luce	Whig
1859	Henry Howard	Liberal
1868	Walter Powell	Conservative
1882 by-election	Charles William Miles	Conservative
1885	Constituency abolished	

== Election results ==
=== Elections in the 1830s ===
General election 1830: Malmesbury
Party	Candidate	Votes	%
Tory	Charles Forbes	Unopposed	
Tory	John Forbes (1801-1840)	Unopposed	
Registered electors		13	
Tory hold			
Tory hold			

General election 1831: Malmesbury
Party	Candidate	Votes	%
Tory	Charles Forbes	13	50.0
Tory	John Forbes (1801-1840)	13	50.0
Whig	George Julius Poulett Scrope	0	0.0
Majority		13	50.0
Turnout		13	100.0
Registered electors		13	
Tory hold			
Tory hold			

General election 1832: Malmesbury
Party	Candidate	Votes	%
Whig	James Howard	Unopposed	
Registered electors		291	
Whig gain from Tory			

General election 1835: Malmesbury
Party	Candidate	Votes	%
Whig	James Howard	Unopposed	
Registered electors		292	
Whig hold			

General election 1837: Malmesbury
Party	Candidate	Votes	%
Whig	James Howard	112	54.1
Conservative	Isaac Salter	95	45.9
Majority		17	8.2
Turnout		207	79.6
Registered electors		260	
Whig hold			

=== Elections in the 1840s ===
General election 1841: Malmesbury
Party	Candidate	Votes	%	±%
Whig	James Howard	125	54.3	+0.2
Conservative	Lancelot Archer Burton	105	45.7	−0.2
Majority		20	8.6	+0.4
Turnout		230	73.0	−6.6
Registered electors		315		
Whig hold		Swing	+0.2	

General election 1847: Malmesbury
Party	Candidate	Votes	%	±%
Whig	James Howard	Unopposed		
Registered electors		320		
Whig hold				

=== Elections in the 1850s ===
General election 1852: Malmesbury
Party	Candidate	Votes	%	±%
Whig	Thomas Luce	137	51.7	N/A
Conservative	Peter Audley Lovell	128	48.3	New
Majority		9	3.4	N/A
Turnout		265	85.8	N/A
Registered electors		309		
Whig hold				

General election 1857: Malmesbury
Party	Candidate	Votes	%	±%
Whig	Thomas Luce	Unopposed		
Registered electors		315		
Whig hold				

General election 1859: Malmesbury
Party	Candidate	Votes	%	±%
Liberal	Henry Howard	Unopposed		
Registered electors		343		
Liberal hold				

=== Elections in the 1860s ===
General election 1865: Malmesbury
Party	Candidate	Votes	%	±%
Liberal	Henry Howard	157	53.6	N/A
Conservative	John Gilbert Talbot	136	46.4	New
Majority		21	7.2	N/A
Turnout		293	89.1	N/A
Registered electors		329		
Liberal hold				

General election 1868: Malmesbury
Party	Candidate	Votes	%	±%
Conservative	Walter Powell	337	51.8	+5.4
Liberal	Henry Howard	314	48.2	−5.4
Majority		23	3.6	N/A
Turnout		651	82.9	−6.2
Registered electors		785		
Conservative gain from Liberal		Swing	+5.4	

=== Elections in the 1870s ===
General election 1874: Malmesbury
Party	Candidate	Votes	%	±%
Conservative	Walter Powell	Unopposed		
Registered electors		1,053		
Conservative hold				

=== Elections in the 1880s ===
General election 1880: Malmesbury
Party	Candidate	Votes	%	±%
Conservative	Walter Powell	602	66.0	N/A
Liberal	Arthur Kitching	310	34.0	New
Majority		292	32.0	N/A
Turnout		912	84.5	N/A
Registered electors		1,079		
Conservative hold		Swing		

Powell was declared dead after he disappeared when a hydrogen balloon he was travelling in was blown out into the English Channel and never seen again.

By-election, 7 Mar 1882: Malmesbury
Party	Candidate	Votes	%	±%
Conservative	Charles William Miles	491	53.0	−13.0
Liberal	Charles Richard Luce	435	47.0	+13.0
Majority		56	6.0	−26.0
Turnout		926	86.9	+2.4
Registered electors		1,066		
Conservative hold		Swing	−13.0	
