= Charlton Park, Wiltshire =

Country house in Charlton, Wiltshire, England

Charlton Park House
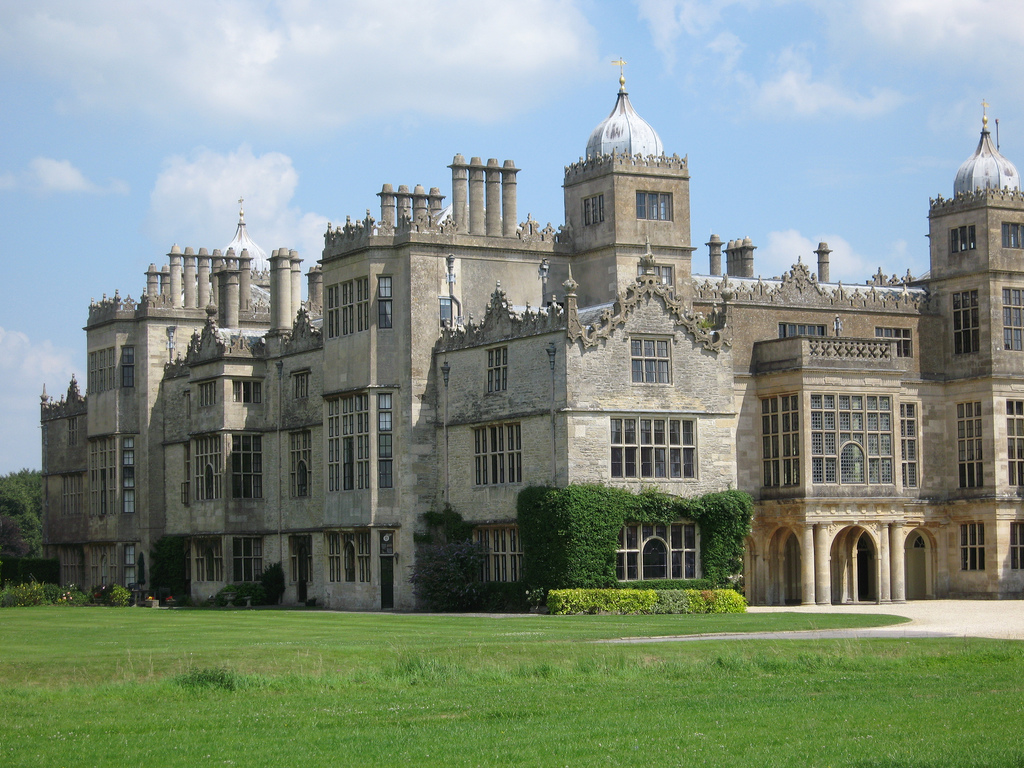
- Charlton Park House

- Location within Wiltshire
- 51°36′05″N 2°04′12″W
- Type: Prodigy house
- Location: Charlton, Wiltshire, England

Site notes
- Architectural styles: Elizabethan and Jacobean
- Website: charltonparkestate.com

Listed Building – Grade I
- Official name: Charlton Park House
- Designated: 12 December 1951
- Reference no.: 1022216

Listed Building – Grade II
- Official name: Andover House and Estate Office
- Designated: 16 July 1987
- Reference no.: 1262080

Listed Building – Grade II
- Official name: Stables at Andover House
- Designated: 16 July 1987
- Reference no.: 1363923

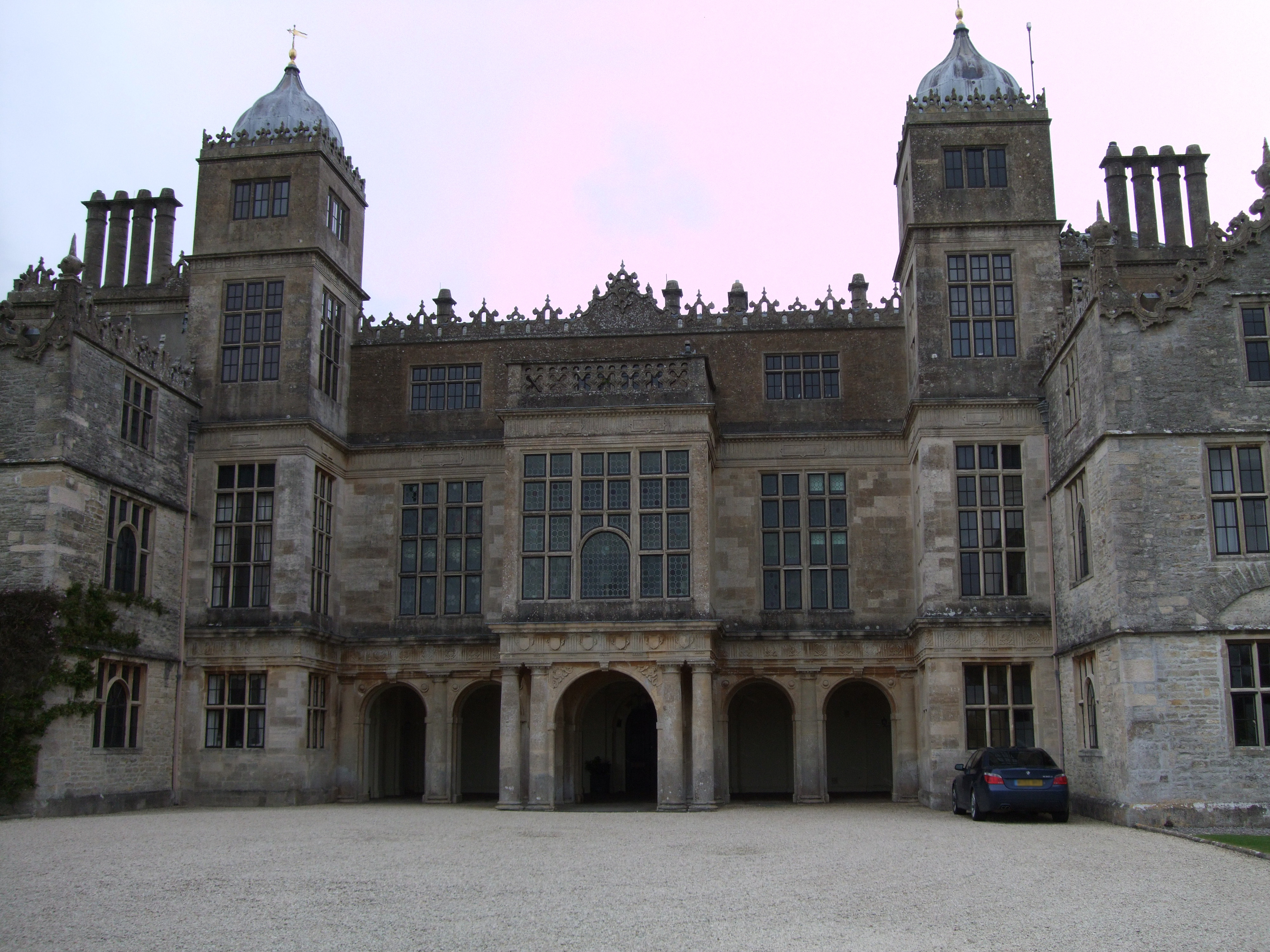
Charlton Park House, entrance

Charlton Park is a country house and estate in Wiltshire, England, 2 miles (3.2 km) northeast of the town of Malmesbury. Charlton Park House is a Grade I listed building and a leading example of the prodigy house.

Malmesbury Abbey held Charlton manor from before 1086 until the Dissolution. The house was begun in the 1560s by Henry Knyvet, whose wife Elizabeth Stumpe had inherited the manor. In 1598 the manor passed to their daughter Catherine, wife of Thomas Howard, who was created Earl of Suffolk in 1603, and the estate continues to be the seat of the earls.

Enlargement and alteration of the house, including the addition of the second floor and stair turrets, was completed in 1607. John Dryden wrote Annus Mirabilis while staying at the house in 1667.

Major alterations were made in the 1770s by Matthew Brettingham the Younger for Henry Howard, 12th Earl of Suffolk, with the rebuilding of the south front, additional stair turrets, and the roofing-over of the central courtyard to make a large domed hall; the interior was unfinished on Henry's death in 1779 and was not completed until the early 20th century. Brettingham probably also built Andover House, some 150 metres north of the main house, with its estate offices and stables.

The house was converted into apartments in 1975. The park hosts corporate events and, since 2007, the annual WOMAD Charlton Park music festival.

There is a small airfield at the estate with two grass runways 02/20 and 07/25. Parts of "Piece of Cake", a 1988 British six-part television serial depicting the fictional life of a Royal Air Force fighter squadron during the first year of World War II, were filmed here. The squadron's officers' mess was set in the house, and Spitfire fighter aircraft were operated from the airfield.

The small village of Charlton is immediately to the east of the estate. The civil parish of Charlton encompasses the village and the estate.

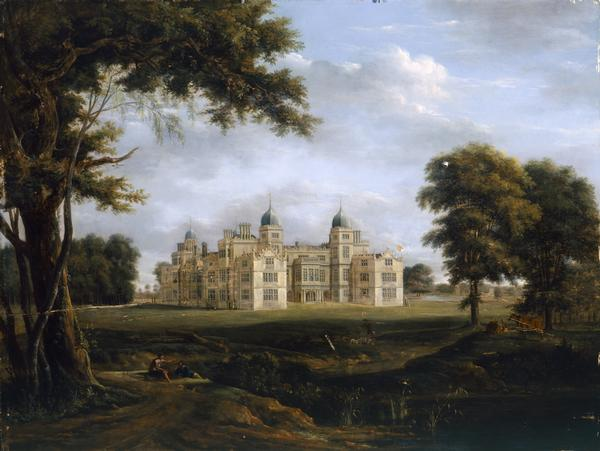
Charlton park from the west, c.1800, Hendrik Frans de Cort
