= Henry Grey, Duke of Suffolk =

English nobleman and courtier (1517–1554)

Henry Grey
- Duke of Suffolk; Marquess of Dorset
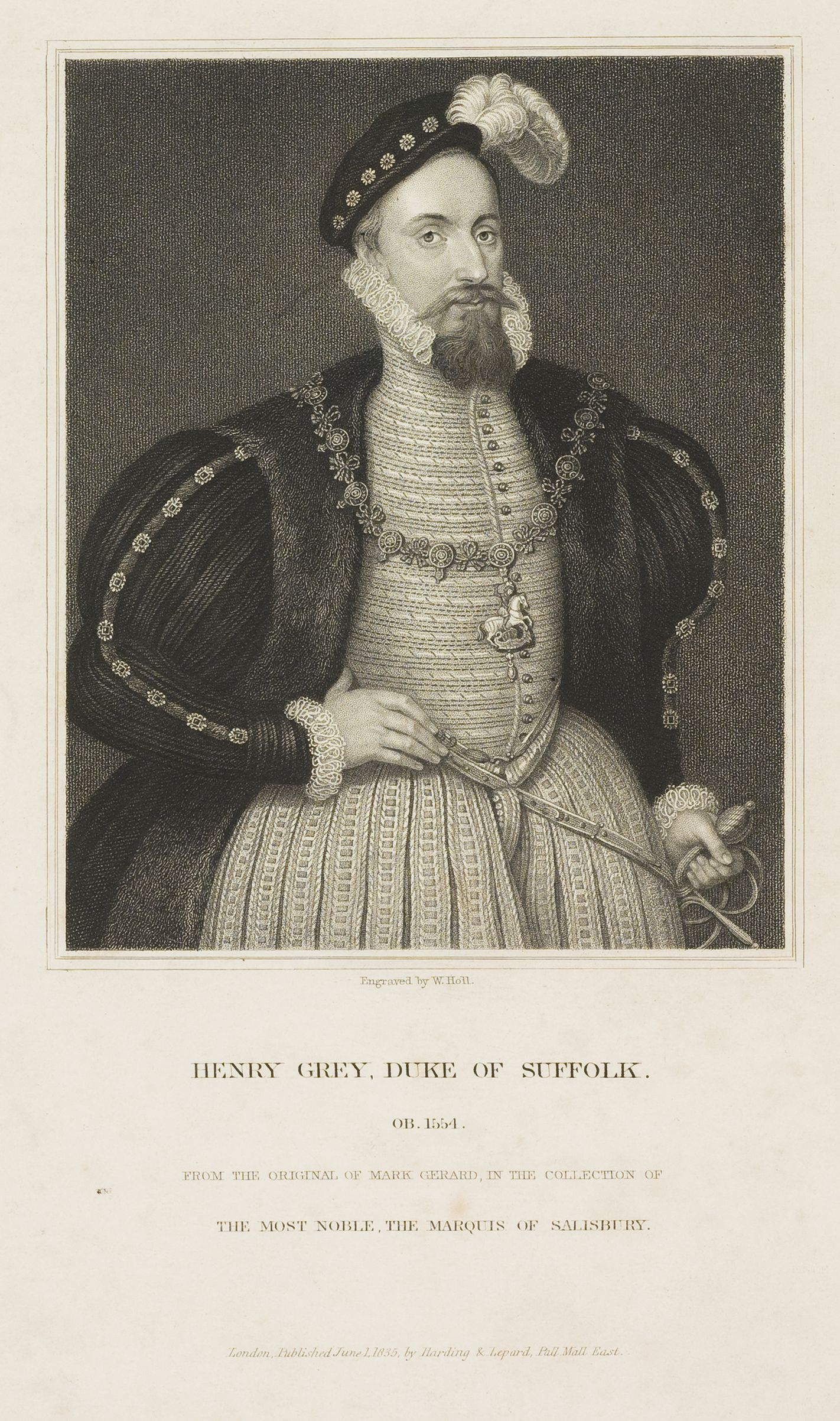
- Possible portrayal of Henry Grey-(although now thought to be Robert Dudley, 1st Earl of Leicester)
- Born: 17 January 1517; Westminster, London, England
- Died: 23 February 1554 (aged 37); Tower Hill, London, England
- Cause of death: Execution
- Noble family: House of Grey
- Spouse: Frances Brandon (m. 1533)
- Issue: Lady Jane Grey; Lady Katherine Grey; Lady Mary Grey
- Father: Thomas Grey, 2nd Marquess of Dorset
- Mother: Margaret Wotton

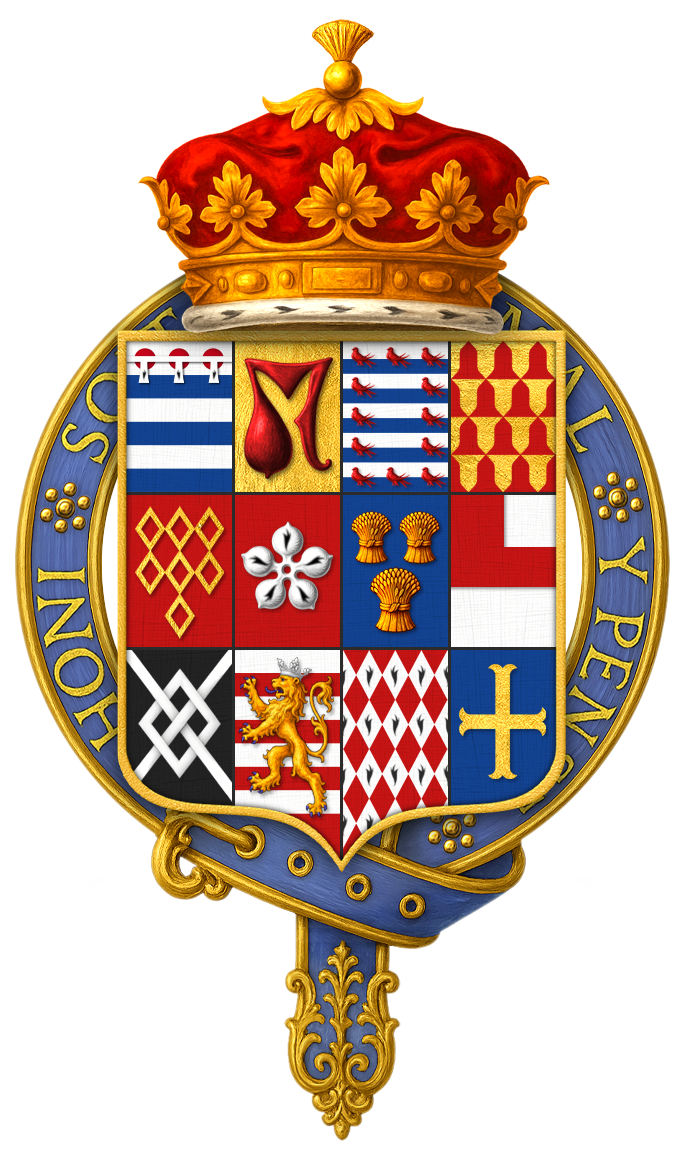
Quartered arms of Sir Henry Grey, 1st Duke of Suffolk, KG

Henry Grey, Duke of Suffolk, 3rd Marquess of Dorset KG KB (17 January 1517 – 23 February 1554), was an English courtier and nobleman of the Tudor period. He was the father of Lady Jane Grey, known as "the Nine Days Queen".

== Origins ==
He was born on 17 January 1517 at Westminster, London, and was the son and heir of Thomas Grey, 2nd Marquess of Dorset (1477–1530) by his wife Margaret Wotton (1485–1541), daughter of Sir Robert Wotton (c. 1463–1524) of Boughton Malherbe in Kent. Through his father, he was a great-grandson of Elizabeth Woodville, the wife of King Edward IV, by her first marriage to Sir John Grey of Groby.

== Marriage and progeny ==
Before 1530, Grey was betrothed to Catherine FitzAlan, the daughter of William FitzAlan, 18th Earl of Arundel, whom he later refused to marry.

In 1533, with the permission of King Henry VIII, he married his half-second cousin Lady Frances Brandon (1517–1559), the daughter of King Henry's sister Mary and Charles Brandon, 1st Duke of Suffolk. They had three daughters all second cousins-once-removed to him as well as daughters:

- Lady Jane Grey (1537–1554)
- Lady Katherine Grey (1540–1568)
- Lady Mary Grey (1545–1578)

== Career ==
=== Henry VIII's reign ===
Henry Grey became the 3rd Marquess of Dorset in 1530 following the death of his father. Before Henry VIII's death in 1547, Grey became a fixture in court circles. A knight of the Bath, he was the king's sword-bearer at Anne Boleyn's coronation in 1533, at Anne of Cleves' arrival in 1540, and at the capture of Boulogne in 1545. Twice he bore the Cap of Maintenance in parliament. He helped lead the army in France in 1545. In 1547, he became a Knight of the Order of the Garter.

=== Edward VI's reign ===
After Henry VIII's death in 1547, Grey fell out of favour with the leader of King Edward VI's government, Edward Seymour, 1st Duke of Somerset and Lord Protector of England. Returning to his home in Bradgate, Leicestershire, Grey concentrated on raising his family to greater heights. Thus, with the Protector's brother Thomas, Lord Seymour, Grey conspired to have his daughter Jane married to the King. This plot failed, ending in Seymour's execution, but Grey emerged unscathed.

In 1549, John Dudley, Earl of Warwick, overthrew the Protectorship and secured power by appointing loyal friends to the Privy Council. Grey joined the Council as a part of this group. In July 1551, his wife's youngest half-brother, Charles Brandon, 3rd Duke of Suffolk, died without a male heir and the dukedom of Suffolk became extinct. Henry Grey was created Duke of Suffolk on 4 or 11 October 1551 at Hampton Court, in the same ceremony that elevated John Dudley to the Dukedom of Northumberland.

== Protestantism ==
Henry Grey was best known for his zeal for the Protestant faith. The Swiss reformer Heinrich Bullinger dedicated a book to him in 1551 and frequently corresponded with the family. In Parliament and on the Privy Council, Grey pushed for further Protestant reforms. He is credited with making Leicestershire one of the most reliably Protestant counties in early modern England.

== Queen Jane ==
Seriously ill, and fearing his own death, King Edward VI granted Northumberland's request for the marriage of Suffolk's daughter Lady Jane Grey to Northumberland's son, Lord Guildford Dudley, on 25 May 1553. Edward later altered his will to make Jane his designated successor. Edward died on 6 July 1553, and three days later Suffolk, Northumberland, and other members of the Privy Council proclaimed Jane queen.

This proclamation failed; not by a large-scale rallying of forces in the country to Henry VIII's eldest daughter, the future Queen Mary I, as is often thought, but by a wavering Privy Council switching its allegiance to Mary during Northumberland's absence on the campaign against her. The decision was led by Henry Fitzalan, 12th Earl of Arundel, Suffolk's brother-in-law, and William Herbert, 1st Earl of Pembroke. Arundel had been imprisoned earlier by Northumberland for having sided with the previous Protector, Somerset; but it is not clear why Pembroke revolted, especially since his son and heir, Henry Herbert, married Henry Grey's other daughter, Katherine, the same day as Jane's wedding. The country was divided in its loyalties to the two contenders for Queen at the time.

By his wife's friendship with the new Queen Mary, Grey and his daughter and son-in-law temporarily avoided execution. However, Mary had Henry Grey beheaded on 23 February 1554 at around nine to ten o'clock in the morning on Tower Hill, after his conviction for high treason for his part in Sir Thomas Wyatt's attempt (January – February 1554) to overthrow her after she announced her intention to marry King Philip II of Spain. Eleven days earlier, on 12 February, his daughter Jane and his son-in-law, Guildford, had been executed.

== Mummified head ==
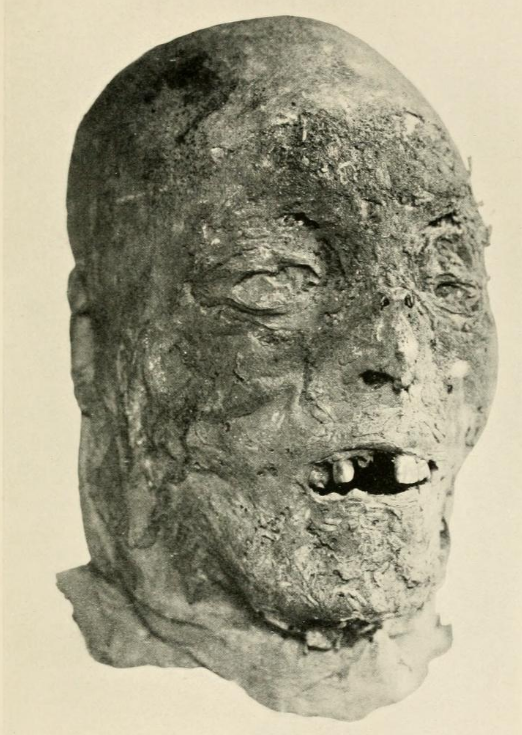
The head found at Holy Trinity, Minories

According to Walter George Bell (writing in 1920), in 1851 the severed head of the Duke of Suffolk was discovered in a vault in the Church of Holy Trinity, Minories, in the City of London, suggested to have been preserved by the tannin-rich oak sawdust used to pad the basket on the scaffold on which he had been beheaded 297 years earlier. Bell believed the head might have been hidden by the Duke's widow to prevent it from being exposed on a spike on London Bridge. Both of them had worshipped in the chapel at Holy Trinity. The church was closed in 1899 and deconsecrated, when the head found a new resting place at St Botolph's Church, Aldgate, to which Holy Trinity Parish had been annexed.

The head was examined in the late 19th century by Sir George Scharf, former Keeper of the National Portrait Gallery, who noted a strong resemblance between its features and those in the portrait of the duke then in the possession of the Marquess of Salisbury at Hatfield House. However, Bell also notes a scandal at Holy Trinity in 1786 in which a sexton had been found sawing and chopping up coffins in the vaults and using the wood to stoke the fire in his quarters. Many of the bodies had been partly dismembered in the process, and Bell warned his readers that the surviving head might well have resulted from this debacle.

In later years, the head was sealed in a vault in the crypt at St Botolph's, until a planned conversion of the space into an office resulted in an archaeological investigation of the site between April and July 1990. The archaeologists recovered the head from the vault and the Rector of the church buried it in the churchyard.

== Family tree ==
Berkshire, Bindon, Pembroke and Suffolk family tree

Earl of Norfolk and Suffolk (1st creation), before 1069
Ralph the Staller c. 1011–1068; 1st Earl of Norfolk and Suffolk, or of the East Angles
Ralph de Gael c. 1040 – c. 1096; 2nd Earl of Norfolk and Suffolk, or of the East Angles
Earl of suffolk (2nd creation), 1337	Earldom of Norfolk and Suffolk, or of the East Angles (1st creation) extinct, 1382
Robert Ufford; 1298–1369; 1st Earl of Suffolk
Earl of Suffolk (3rd creation), 1385
John Howard	Robert Scales d. 1369; 3rd Baron Scales	Katherine Ufford b. c. 1317	William Ufford; 1330–1382; 2nd Earl of Suffolk	Michael de la Pole; 1330–1389; 1st Earl of Suffolk
Earldom of Suffolk (2nd creation) extinct, 1382
Robert Howard d. 1388	Margaret Scales
John Howard c. 1366–1437	Thomas de Mowbray; 1365–1399; Duke of Norfolk	Michael de la Pole; 1367–1415; 2nd Earl of Suffolk
Marquess of Suffolk, 1444; Earl of Pembroke (6th creation), 1447; Duke of Suffolk (1st creation), 1448
Robert Howard; 1385–1436	Margaret de Mowbray c. 1388–1459	Elizabeth Mowbray b. 1398	Michael de la Pole; 1394–1415; 3rd Earl of Suffolk	William de la Pole; 1396–1450; 1st Duke of Suffolk, etc., 4th Earl of Suffolk
Earldom (3rd creation), Marquessate, and Dukedom (1st creation) of Suffolk and Earldom of Pembroke (6th creation) forfeit, 1450
John Howard; 1425–1485; Duke of Norfolk	Cecily Neville; 1415–1495	Richard Plantagenet; 1411–1460; Duke of York
Earldom (3rd creation), Marquessate, and Dukedom (1st creation) of Suffolk restored, 1463
Thomas Howard; 1443–1524; Duke of Norfolk	Richard III; 1452–1485; Duke of Gloucester, King of England	Edward IV; 1442–1483; King of England	Elizabeth Plantagenet; 1456–c. 1503	John de la Pole; 1442–1492; 2nd Duke of Suffolk, etc., 5th Earl of Suffolk
Earl of Pembroke (9th creation), 1479
Elizabeth Boleyn c. 1480–1538	Thomas Howard; 1473–1554; Duke of Norfolk	Edmund Howard; 1478–1539	Elizabeth of York; 1466–1503	Henry VII; 1457–1509; King of England	Edward Plantagenet; 1470–1483; Earl of Pembroke later King of England	Edmund de la Pole; 1472–1513; 3rd Duke of Suffolk, etc., 6th Earl of Suffolk
Earldom of Penbroke (9th creation) merged in the crown, 1483	Marquessate and Dukedom (1st creation) of Suffolk surrendered, 1493; Earldom of Suffolk (3rd creation) forfeit, 1504
Marquess of Pembroke, 1532	Duke of Suffolk (2nd creation), 1514
Anne Boleyn c. 1501 or 1507–1536; Marquess of Pembroke	Catherine Howard c. 1524–1542	Henry VIII; 1491–1547; King of England	Mary Tudor; 1496–1533; Queen of France	Charles Brandon; 1484–1545; 1st Duke of Suffolk
Marquessate of Pembroke forfeit, 1536
Duke of Suffolk (3rd creation), 1551
Henry Howard; 1516/1517–1547; Earl of Surrey	Henry Grey; 1517–1554; Duke of Suffolk, Marquess of Dorset	Frances Grey; 1517–1559
Dukedom of Suffolk (3rd creation) forfeit, 1554
Thomas Howard; 1536 or 1538 – 1572; Duke of Norfolk	Jane Grey; 1536/1537 – 1554; Disputed Queen of England	Henry Brandon; 1535–1551; 2nd Duke of Suffolk	Charles Brandon; 1537–1551; 3rd Duke of Suffolk
Dukedom of Suffolk (2nd creation) extinct, 1551
see Dukes of Norfolk family tree	Earl of Suffolk (4th creation), 1603
Thomas Howard; 1561–1626; 1st Earl of Suffolk
Baron Howard of Charlton, 1621; Viscount Andover, 1622; Earl of Berkshire (2nd creation), 1626
Theophilus Howard; 1584–1640; 2nd Earl of Suffolk	Thomas Howard; 1st Earl of Berkshire, etc.
James Howard c. 1620–1689; 3rd Earl of Suffolk	George Howard; 1625–1691; 4th Earl of Suffolk	Henry Howard; 1627–1709; 5th Earl of Suffolk	Charles Howard; 1615–1679; 2nd Earl of Berkshire, etc.	Thomas Howard; 1619–1706; 3rd Earl of Berkshire, etc.	William Howard b. 1622	Philip Howard; 1629–1717
Earl of Bindon, 1706
Henry Howard; 1670–1718; 6th Earl of Suffolk, 1st Earl of Bindon	Edward Howard; 1672–1731; 8th Earl of Suffolk	Charles Howard; 1685–1733; 9th Earl of Suffolk	Craven Howard d. 1700	Dorothy Howard	Capt. Charles Howard b. 1681
Charles Howard; 1693–1722; 7th Earl of Suffolk, 2nd Earl of Bindon	Henry Howard; 1706–1745; 10th Earl of Suffolk	Henry Bowes Howard; 1686–1757; 11th Earl of Suffolk, 4th Earl of Berkshire, etc.	Catherine Graham d. 1762	Capt. Philip Howard; 1629–1717
Earldom of Bindon extinct, 1722
William Howard; 1714–1756 styled Viscount Andover	Thomas Howard; 1721–1783; 14th Earl of Suffolk, 7th Earl of Berkshire, etc.	John Howard; 1739–1820; 15th Earl of Suffolk, 8th Earl of Berkshire, etc.
Henry Howard; 1739–1779; 12th Earl of Suffolk, 5th Earl of Berkshire, etc.	Thomas Howard; 1776–1851; 16th Earl of Suffolk, 9th Earl of Berkshire, etc.
Henry Howard; 1779; 13th Earl of Suffolk, 6th Earl of Berkshire, etc.	Charles Howard; 1804–1876; 17th Earl of Suffolk, 10th Earl of Berkshire, etc.
Henry Howard; 1833–1898; 18th Earl of Suffolk, 11th Earl of Berkshire, etc.
Henry Howard; 1877–1917; 19th Earl of Suffolk, 12th Earl of Berkshire, etc.
Charles Howard; 1906–1941; 20th Earl of Suffolk, 13th Earl of Berkshire, etc.
Michael Howard; 1935–2022; 21st Earl of Suffolk, 14th Earl of Berkshire, etc.
Alexander Howard b. 1974; 22nd Earl of Suffolk, 15th Earl of Berkshire, etc., from 2022
Arthur Howard b. 2014

== Notes ==
Political offices
New title	Lord Lieutenant of Leicestershire; 1549–1551	Succeeded by The Earl of Huntingdon
Preceded by The Earl of Huntingdon	Lord Lieutenant of Leicestershire; 1552–1554	Succeeded by The Earl of Huntingdon
Legal offices
Preceded by The Earl of Wiltshire	Justice in Eyre south of the Trent; 1550–1553	Succeeded by The Earl of Sussex
Peerage of England
Preceded by Thomas Grey	Marquess of Dorset; 3rd creation 1530–1554	Forfeit
