= Michael Howard, 21st Earl of Suffolk =

English peer (1935–2022)

The Right Honourable The Earl of Suffolk and Berkshire

Personal details
- Born: 27 March 1935
- Died: 5 August 2022 (aged 87)
- Spouses: Simone Litman (m. 1960) Anita Fuglesang (m. 1973) Linda Jacqueline Paravicini (m. 1983)
- Children: 5, including Alexander Howard, 22nd Earl of Suffolk
- Parents: Charles Howard, 20th Earl of Suffolk; Mimi Forde Pigott

Michael John James George Robert Howard, 21st Earl of Suffolk & 14th Earl of Berkshire (27 March 1935 – 5 August 2022), styled Viscount Andover until 1941, was an English peer, a member of the House of Lords from 1956 to 1999.

== Life ==
Michael Howard was born on 27 March 1935, the son of Charles Howard, 20th Earl of Suffolk, and actress and ballet dancer Mimi Forde Pigott.

He succeeded his father in 1941, when his father was killed by a bomb he was attempting to defuse.

He was briefly educated at Winchester College, but left after a year before attending the prestigious Le Rosey school in Switzerland.

After his death, the writer Jilly Cooper revealed that Suffolk had been one of the inspirations for her best-known literary creation, Rupert Campbell-Black.

== Personal life ==
Suffolk was married three times: He married, firstly, on 1 October 1960, Simone Litman, by whom he had one daughter:

- Lady Lucinda Howard (26 March 1961 – 21 December 1962)

On 22 September 1973, Suffolk married Anita Fuglesang (who later married Charles Stanhope, 12th Earl of Harrington), with whom he had two children:

- Alexander Charles Michael Winston Robsahm Howard, 22nd Earl of Suffolk (b. 17 September 1974); married Victoria Hamilton (divorced 2018)
- Lady Katharine Emma Frances Robsahm Howard (b. 1976) married William Rogers

On 15 December 1983, Suffolk married the former Linda Jacqueline Paravicini (married, firstly, Alexander Hood, 4th Viscount Bridport), with whom he had two children:

- Lady Philippa Mimi Jacqueline Henrietta Howard (b. 1985) married Archie Lord in 2017.
- Lady Natasha Rose Catherine Linda Howard (b. 1987). married Charles Quick in March 2022.

The Earl of Suffolk lived at Charlton Park, Wiltshire. He was also 14th Earl of Berkshire, but signed in the name of 'Suffolk', his most senior title. He died on 5 August 2022, at the age of 87.

== Family tree ==
Berkshire, Bindon, Pembroke and Suffolk family tree

Earl of Norfolk and Suffolk (1st creation), before 1069
Ralph the Staller c. 1011–1068; 1st Earl of Norfolk and Suffolk, or of the East Angles
Ralph de Gael c. 1040 – c. 1096; 2nd Earl of Norfolk and Suffolk, or of the East Angles
Earl of suffolk (2nd creation), 1337 | Earldom of Norfolk and Suffolk, or of the East Angles (1st creation) extinct, 1382
Robert Ufford; 1298–1369; 1st Earl of Suffolk
Earl of Suffolk (3rd creation), 1385
John Howard | Robert Scales d. 1369; 3rd Baron Scales | Katherine Ufford b. c. 1317 | William Ufford; 1330–1382; 2nd Earl of Suffolk | Michael de la Pole; 1330–1389; 1st Earl of Suffolk
Earldom of Suffolk (2nd creation) extinct, 1382
Robert Howard d. 1388 | Margaret Scales
John Howard c. 1366–1437 | Thomas de Mowbray; 1365–1399; Duke of Norfolk | Michael de la Pole; 1367–1415; 2nd Earl of Suffolk
Marquess of Suffolk, 1444; Earl of Pembroke (6th creation), 1447; Duke of Suffolk (1st creation), 1448
Robert Howard; 1385–1436 | Margaret de Mowbray c. 1388–1459 | Elizabeth Mowbray b. 1398 | Michael de la Pole; 1394–1415; 3rd Earl of Suffolk | William de la Pole; 1396–1450; 1st Duke of Suffolk, etc., 4th Earl of Suffolk
Earldom (3rd creation), Marquessate, and Dukedom (1st creation) of Suffolk and Earldom of Pembroke (6th creation) forfeit, 1450
John Howard; 1425–1485; Duke of Norfolk | Cecily Neville; 1415–1495 | Richard Plantagenet; 1411–1460; Duke of York
Earldom (3rd creation), Marquessate, and Dukedom (1st creation) of Suffolk restored, 1463
Thomas Howard; 1443–1524; Duke of Norfolk | Richard III; 1452–1485; Duke of Gloucester, King of England | Edward IV; King of England; 1442–1483 | Elizabeth Plantagenet; 1456–c. 1503 | John de la Pole; 1442–1492; 2nd Duke of Suffolk, etc., 5th Earl of Suffolk
Elizabeth Boleyn c. 1480–1538 | Thomas Howard; 1473–1554; Duke of Norfolk | Edmund Howard; 1478–1539 | Elizabeth of York; 1444–1503 | Henry VII; 1457–1509; King of England | Edmund de la Pole; 1472–1513; 3rd Duke of Suffolk, etc., 6th Earl of Suffolk
Marquessate and Dukedom (1st creation) of Suffolk surrendered, 1493; Earldom of Suffolk (3rd creation) forfeit, 1504
Marquess of Pembroke, 1532 | Duke of Suffolk (2nd creation), 1514
Anne Boleyn c. 1501 or 1507–1536; Marquess of Pembroke | Catherine Howard c. 1524–1542 | Henry VIII; 1491–1547; King of England | Mary Tudor; 1496–1533; Queen of France | Charles Brandon; 1484–1545; 1st Duke of Suffolk
Marquessate of Pembroke forfeit, 1536
Duke of Suffolk (3rd creation), 1551
Henry Howard; 1516/1517–1547; Earl of Surrey | Henry Grey; 1517–1554; Duke of Suffolk, Marquess of Dorset | Frances Grey; 1517–1559
Dukedom of Suffolk (3rd creation) forfeit, 1554
Thomas Howard; 1536 or 1538 – 1572; Duke of Norfolk | Jane Grey; 1536/1537 – 1554; Disputed Queen of England | Henry Brandon; 1535–1551; 2nd Duke of Suffolk | Charles Brandon; 1537–1551; 3rd Duke of Suffolk
Dukedom of Suffolk (2nd creation) extinct, 1551
see Dukes of Norfolk family tree | Earl of Suffolk (4th creation), 1603
Thomas Howard; 1561–1626; 1st Earl of Suffolk
Baron Howard of Charlton, 1621; Viscount Andover, 1622; Earl of Berkshire (2nd creation), 1626
Theophilus Howard; 1584–1640; 2nd Earl of Suffolk | Thomas Howard; 1st Earl of Berkshire, etc.
James Howard c. 1620–1689; 3rd Earl of Suffolk | George Howard; 1625–1691; 4th Earl of Suffolk | Henry Howard; 1627–1709; 5th Earl of Suffolk | Charles Howard; 1615–1679; 2nd Earl of Berkshire, etc. | Thomas Howard; 1619–1706; 3rd Earl of Berkshire, etc. | William Howard b. 1622 | Philip Howard; 1629–1717
Earl of Bindon, 1706
Henry Howard; 1670–1718; 6th Earl of Suffolk, 1st Earl of Bindon | Edward Howard; 1672–1731; 8th Earl of Suffolk | Charles Howard; 1685–1733; 9th Earl of Suffolk | Craven Howard d. 1700 | Dorothy Howard | Capt. Charles Howard b. 1681
Charles Howard; 1693–1722; 7th Earl of Suffolk, 2nd Earl of Bindon | Henry Howard; 1706–1745; 10th Earl of Suffolk | Henry Bowes Howard; 1686–1757; 11th Earl of Suffolk, 4th Earl of Berkshire, etc. | Catherine Graham d. 1762 | Capt. Philip Howard; 1629–1717
Earldom of Bindon extinct, 1722
William Howard; 1714–1756 styled Viscount Andover | Thomas Howard; 1721–1783; 14th Earl of Suffolk, 7th Earl of Berkshire, etc. | John Howard; 1739–1820; 15th Earl of Suffolk, 8th Earl of Berkshire, etc.
Henry Howard; 1739–1779; 12th Earl of Suffolk, 5th Earl of Berkshire, etc. | Thomas Howard; 1776–1851; 16th Earl of Suffolk, 9th Earl of Berkshire, etc.
Henry Howard; 1779; 13th Earl of Suffolk, 6th Earl of Berkshire, etc. | Charles Howard; 1804–1876; 17th Earl of Suffolk, 10th Earl of Berkshire, etc.
Henry Howard; 1833–1898; 18th Earl of Suffolk, 11th Earl of Berkshire, etc.
Henry Howard; 1877–1917; 19th Earl of Suffolk, 12th Earl of Berkshire, etc.
Charles Howard; 1906–1941; 20th Earl of Suffolk, 13th Earl of Berkshire, etc.
Michael Howard; 1935–2022; 21st Earl of Suffolk, 14th Earl of Berkshire, etc.
Alexander Howard b. 1974; 22nd Earl of Suffolk, 15th Earl of Berkshire, etc., from 2022
Arthur Howard b. 2014

Peerage of England
| Preceded by Charles Howard | Earl of Suffolk; 1941–2022 | Succeeded by Alexander Howard |
| Preceded by Charles Howard | Earl of Berkshire; 1941–2022 | Succeeded by Alexander Howard |
