= Earl of Berkshire =

Title in the Peerage of England

Earldom of Berkshire held with Earldom of Suffolk
- Arms of Howard; Arms: Quarterly 1st Gules, on a Bend between six Crosses-Crosslet fitchée Argent, an Escutcheon Or, charged with a Demi-Lion rampant pierced through the mouth by an arrow within a Double Tressure flory counterflory of the first (for Howard); 2nd Gules, three Lions passant guardant in pale Or, armed and langued Azure, in chief a Label of three-points Argent (for Thomas of Brotherton); 3rd Chequy Or and Azure (for Warenne); 4th Gules, a Lion rampant Or, armed and langued Azure (for Fitzalan) the whole differenced at the fess-point with a Crescent Sable. Crest: On a Chapeau Gules, turned up Ermine, a Lion statant guardant tail extended Or, gorged with a Collar Argent, charged on the shoulder with a Crescent for difference. Supporters: On either side a Lion Argent, charged on the shoulder with a Crescent for difference.
- Creation date: 29 January 1621 (first creation); 7 February 1626 (second creation)
- Created by: James VI and I (first creation); Charles I (second creation)
- Peerage: Peerage of England
- First holder: Francis Norris, 1st Earl of Berkshire
- Present holder: Alexander Howard, 22nd Earl of Suffolk, 15th Earl of Berkshire
- Heir apparent: Arthur Howard, Viscount Andover
- Remainder to: Heirs male of the body, lawfully begotten
- Subsidiary titles: Viscount Andover; Baron Howard of Charlton
- Extinction date: 29 January 1622 (first creation)
- Seat: Charlton Park
- Motto: NOUS MAINTIENDRONS (We will maintain)

Earl of Berkshire is a title that has been created twice in the Peerage of England.

It was created, with Viscount Thame, for the first time in 1621 for Francis Norris, 2nd Baron Norreys of Rycote. For more information on this creation (which became extinct on his death in 1622), see the Earl of Abingdon and also the Earl of Lindsey.

The second creation came in 1626 in favour of Thomas Howard, 1st Viscount Andover. He was the second son of Thomas Howard, 1st Earl of Suffolk, second son of the second marriage of Thomas Howard, 4th Duke of Norfolk. His mother was Katherine, daughter of Sir Henry Knyvett of Charlton in Wiltshire. Howard had already been created Baron Howard of Charlton, in the County of Wiltshire, and Viscount Andover, in the County of Southampton, in 1622. These titles are also in the Peerage of England. Lord Berkshire succeeded to the Charlton estate through his mother in 1638. He was succeeded by his eldest son, the second Earl. He had already in 1640 been summoned to the House of Lords through a writ of acceleration in his father's junior title of Baron Howard of Charlton. He had no sons and on his death in 1679 the titles passed to his younger brother, the third Earl. He represented Wallingford in the House of Commons. He also died without male issue and was succeeded by his great-nephew, the fourth Earl. He was the grandson of the Hon. William Howard, fourth son of the first Earl. In 1745 he succeeded his third cousin as eleventh Earl of Suffolk. For further history of the titles, see the Earl of Suffolk.

== Earls of Berkshire and Viscounts Thame, First Creation (1621) ==
- see the Earl of Abingdon and the Earl of Lindsey

Peerage family tree of: Abingdon, Ancaster, Ancaster and Kesteven, Bertie of Thame, Gwydyr, Lindsey, Norreys, Thame, and Willoughby

Baron Willoughby, 1313
Robert de Willoughby; 1260–1317; 1st Baron Willoughby
John de Willoughby; 1304–1349; 2nd Baron Willoughby
suffix de Eresby added, c. 1350–1360
John de Willoughby; 1329–1372; 3rd Baron Willoughby de Eresby	John (de) Welles; 1334–1361; 4th Baron Welles
Robert Willoughby; 1349–1396; 4th Baron Willoughby de Eresby	John Welles; 1352–1421; 5th Baron Welles
William Willoughby c. 1370–1409; 5th Baron Willoughby de Eresby	Eudes (or Eudo) Welles; 1387–1417
Robert Willoughby c. 1385–1452; 6th Baron Willoughby de Eresby	Thomas Willoughby	Lionel (de) Welles c. 1406–1461; 6th Baron Welles	Margaret Beauchamp c. 1410 – c. 1482
Joan Willoughby c. 1425–bef. 1462; 7th Baroness Willoughby de Eresby	Richard Welles c. 1428–1470; 7th Baron Welles	Robert Willoughby d. 1465	Cecily Welles	King Edward IV; 1442–1483	Margaret Beaufort; 1443–1509
Barony of Welles (1st creation) attainted, 1470
Baron Welles (2nd creation), 1483	Viscount Welles, 1486
Robert Welles d. 1470; 8th Baron Willoughby de Eresby	Joan Welles d. bef. 1475; 9th Baron Willoughby de Eresby	Richard Hastings d. 1503; Baron Welles	Christopher Willoughby; 1453–1498/1499; 10th Baron Willoughby de Eresby	John Welles c. 1450–1498; 1st Viscount Welles	Cecily of York; 1469–1507	Elizabeth of York; 1466–1503	King Henry VII; 1457–1509
Barony of Welles (2nd creation) possibly extinct, 1503	Viscountcy of Welles extinct, 1498
William Willoughby; 1482–1526; 11th Baron Willoughby de Eresby	Charles Brandon c. 1484–1545; 1st Duke of Suffolk	Mary Tudor; 1496–1533	Louis XII of France; 1462–1515	King Henry VIII; 1491–1547
Baron Norreys of Rycote, 1572
Henry Norris (c. 1530–1601); 1st Baron Norreys	Richard Bertie; 1516–1582	Katherine Brandon; 1519–1580; 12th Baroness Willoughby de Eresby	Frances Grey; 1517–1559
William Norreys (1552–1579)	Peregrine Bertie; 1555–1601; 13th Baron Willoughby de Eresby	Lady Jane Grey; 1536/1537–1554
Earl of Berkshire and Viscount Thame, 1621	Earl of Lindsey, 1626
Francis Norris; 1582–1624; Earl of Berkshire, etc., 2nd Baron Norreys	Robert Bertie; 1582–1642; 1st Earl of Lindsey, 14th Baron Willoughby de Eresby
Earldom of Berkshire and Viscountcy of Thame extinct, 1624
Elizabeth Wray d. 1645; 3rd Baroness Norreys
Bridget Bertie; 1627–1657; 4th Baroness Norreys	Montagu Bertie; 1608–1666; 2nd Earl of Lindsey, 15th Baron Willoughby de Eresby	Martha Cockayne
Earl of Abingdon, 1682
James Bertie; 1653–1669; 1st Earl of Abingdon, 5th Baron Norreys	Robert Bertie; 1630–1701; 3rd Earl of Lindsey, 16th Baron Willoughby de Eresby	Charles Bertie c. 1640 – c. 1710
Duke of Ancaster and Kesteven and Marquess of Lindsey, 1706
Montagu Venables-Bertie; 1673–1743; 2nd Earl of Abingdon, 6th Baron Norreys	James Bertie; 1674–1735	Robert Bertie; 1660–1723; 1st Duke of Ancaster and Kesteven, etc., 4th Earl of Lindsey, 17th Baron Willoughby de Eresby	Charles Bertie c. 1678–1730
Willoughby Bertie; 1692–1760; 3rd Earl of Abingdon, 7th Baron Norreys	Peregrine Bertie; 1686–1742; 2nd Duke of Ancaster and Kesteven, etc., 5th Earl of Lindsey, 18th Baron Willoughby de Eresby
Peregrine Bertie; 1714–1778; 3rd Duke of Ancaster and Kesteven, etc., 6th Earl of Lindsey, 19th Baron Willoughby de Eresby	Brownlow Bertie; 1729–1809; 5rd Duke of Ancaster and Kesteven, etc., 8th Earl of Lindsey	Peregrine Bertie c. 1709 – c. 1779
Baron Gwydyr, 1796	Dukedom of Ancaster and Kesteven and Marquessate of Lindsey extinct, 1809
Willoughby Bertie; 1740–1799; 4th Earl of Abingdon, 8th Baron Norreys	Robert Bertie; 1756–1779; 4th Duke of Ancaster and Kesteven, etc., 7th Earl of Lindsey, 20th Baron Willoughby de Eresby	Priscilla Bertie; 1761–1828; 21st Baroness Willoughby de Eresby	Peter Burrell; 1754–1820; 1st Baron Gwydyr	Albemarle Bertie; 1744–1818; 9th Earl of Lindsey
Montagu Bertie; 1784–1854; 5th Earl of Abingdon, 9th Baron Norreys	Peter Drummond-Burrell; 1782–1865; 22nd Baron Willoughby de Eresby, 2nd Baron Gwydyr	Lindsey Merrik Peter Burrell
Baron Aveland, 1856
Montagu Bertie; 1808–1884; 6th Earl of Abingdon, 10th Baron Norreys	Gilbert Heathcote; 1794–1867; 1st Baron Aveland	Clementina Drummond-Willoughby; 1809–1888; 24th Baron Willoughby de Eresby	Albyric Drummond-Willoughby; 1821–1870; 23rd Baron Willoughby de Eresby, 3rd Baron Gwydyr	Peter Robert Burrell; 1810–1909; 4th Baron Gwydyr	George Augustus Frederick Albemarle Bertie; 1814–1877; 10th Earl of Lindsey	Montague Peregrine Bertie; 1815–1899; 11th Earl of Lindsey
Baron Bertie of Thame, 1915; Viscount Bertie of Thame, 1918	Earl of Ancaster, 1892
Montagu Arthur Bertie; 1836–1928; 7th Earl of Abingdon	Viscount Bertie of Thame; 1844–1919; 1st Viscount Bertie of Thame, etc.	Gilbert Heathcote-Drummond-Willoughby; 1830–1910; 1st Earl of Ancaster, 25th Baron Willoughby de Eresby, 2nd Baron Aveland	Willoughby Merrik Campbell Burrell; 1841–1915; 5th Baron Gwydyr
Barony of Gwydyr extinct, 1915
Montagu Charles Francis Bertie; 1860–1919	Vere Frederick Bertie; 1878–1954; 2nd Viscount Bertie of Thame, etc.	Gilbert Heathcote-Drummond-Willoughby; 1867–1951; 2nd Earl of Ancaster, 26th Baron Willoughby de Eresby, 3rd Baron Aveland	Montague Peregrine Albemarle Bertie; 1861–1938; 12th Earl of Lindsey
Viscountcy and Barony of Bertie of Thame extinct, 1954
Montagu Henry Edmund Cecil Towneley-Bertie; 1887–1963; 13th Earl of Lindsey, 8th Earl of Abingdon	Arthur Michael Cosmo Bertie; 1886–c. 1954–1957	Gilbert James Heathcote-Drummond-Willoughby; 1907–1983; 3rd Earl of Ancaster, 27th Baron Willoughby de Eresby, 4th Baron Aveland
Earldom of Ancaster and Barony of Aveland extinct, 1983
Richard Henry Rupert Bertie b. 1931; 14th Earl of Lindsey, 9th Earl of Abingdon	Nancy Jane Marie Heathcote-Drummond-Willoughby b. 1934; 28th Baroness Willoughby de Eresby

== Earls of Berkshire, Second Creation (1626) ==
Coat of arms of the 2nd to 4th Earls of Berkshire, before succeeding as Earl of Suffolk

- Thomas Howard, 1st Earl of Berkshire (1590–1669)
- Charles Howard, 2nd Earl of Berkshire (1615–1679)
- Thomas Howard, 3rd Earl of Berkshire (1619–1706)
- Henry Bowes Howard, 4th Earl of Berkshire (1687–1757) (succeeded as Earl of Suffolk in 1745)

see Earl of Suffolk for further succession

Berkshire, Bindon, Pembroke and Suffolk family tree

Earl of Norfolk and Suffolk (1st creation), before 1069
Ralph the Staller c. 1011–1068; 1st Earl of Norfolk and Suffolk, or of the East Angles
Ralph de Gael c. 1040 – c. 1096; 2nd Earl of Norfolk and Suffolk, or of the East Angles
Earl of suffolk (2nd creation), 1337	Earldom of Norfolk and Suffolk, or of the East Angles (1st creation) extinct, 1382
Robert Ufford; 1298–1369; 1st Earl of Suffolk
Earl of Suffolk (3rd creation), 1385
John Howard	Robert Scales d. 1369; 3rd Baron Scales	Katherine Ufford b. c. 1317	William Ufford; 1330–1382; 2nd Earl of Suffolk	Michael de la Pole; 1330–1389; 1st Earl of Suffolk
Earldom of Suffolk (2nd creation) extinct, 1382
Robert Howard d. 1388	Margaret Scales
John Howard c. 1366–1437	Thomas de Mowbray; 1365–1399; Duke of Norfolk	Michael de la Pole; 1367–1415; 2nd Earl of Suffolk
Marquess of Suffolk, 1444; Earl of Pembroke (6th creation), 1447; Duke of Suffolk (1st creation), 1448
Robert Howard; 1385–1436	Margaret de Mowbray c. 1388–1459	Elizabeth Mowbray b. 1398	Michael de la Pole; 1394–1415; 3rd Earl of Suffolk	William de la Pole; 1396–1450; 1st Duke of Suffolk, etc., 4th Earl of Suffolk
Earldom (3rd creation), Marquessate, and Dukedom (1st creation) of Suffolk and Earldom of Pembroke (6th creation) forfeit, 1450
John Howard; 1425–1485; Duke of Norfolk	Cecily Neville; 1415–1495	Richard Plantagenet; 1411–1460; Duke of York
Earldom (3rd creation), Marquessate, and Dukedom (1st creation) of Suffolk restored, 1463
Thomas Howard; 1443–1524; Duke of Norfolk	Richard III; 1452–1485; Duke of Gloucester, King of England	Edward IV; 1442–1483; King of England	Elizabeth Plantagenet; 1456–c. 1503	John de la Pole; 1442–1492; 2nd Duke of Suffolk, etc., 5th Earl of Suffolk
Earl of Pembroke (9th creation), 1479
Elizabeth Boleyn c. 1480–1538	Thomas Howard; 1473–1554; Duke of Norfolk	Edmund Howard; 1478–1539	Elizabeth of York; 1466–1503	Henry VII; 1457–1509; King of England	Edward Plantagenet; 1470–1483; Earl of Pembroke later King of England	Edmund de la Pole; 1472–1513; 3rd Duke of Suffolk, etc., 6th Earl of Suffolk
Earldom of Penbroke (9th creation) merged in the crown, 1483	Marquessate and Dukedom (1st creation) of Suffolk surrendered, 1493; Earldom of Suffolk (3rd creation) forfeit, 1504
Marquess of Pembroke, 1532	Duke of Suffolk (2nd creation), 1514
Anne Boleyn c. 1501 or 1507–1536; Marquess of Pembroke	Catherine Howard c. 1524–1542	Henry VIII; 1491–1547; King of England	Mary Tudor; 1496–1533; Queen of France	Charles Brandon; 1484–1545; 1st Duke of Suffolk
Marquessate of Pembroke forfeit, 1536
Duke of Suffolk (3rd creation), 1551
Henry Howard; 1516/1517–1547; Earl of Surrey	Henry Grey; 1517–1554; Duke of Suffolk, Marquess of Dorset	Frances Grey; 1517–1559
Dukedom of Suffolk (3rd creation) forfeit, 1554
Thomas Howard; 1536 or 1538 – 1572; Duke of Norfolk	Jane Grey; 1536/1537 – 1554; Disputed Queen of England	Henry Brandon; 1535–1551; 2nd Duke of Suffolk	Charles Brandon; 1537–1551; 3rd Duke of Suffolk
Dukedom of Suffolk (2nd creation) extinct, 1551
see Dukes of Norfolk family tree	Earl of Suffolk (4th creation), 1603
Thomas Howard; 1561–1626; 1st Earl of Suffolk
Baron Howard of Charlton, 1621; Viscount Andover, 1622; Earl of Berkshire (2nd creation), 1626
Theophilus Howard; 1584–1640; 2nd Earl of Suffolk	Thomas Howard; 1st Earl of Berkshire, etc.
James Howard c. 1620–1689; 3rd Earl of Suffolk	George Howard; 1625–1691; 4th Earl of Suffolk	Henry Howard; 1627–1709; 5th Earl of Suffolk	Charles Howard; 1615–1679; 2nd Earl of Berkshire, etc.	Thomas Howard; 1619–1706; 3rd Earl of Berkshire, etc.	William Howard b. 1622	Philip Howard; 1629–1717
Earl of Bindon, 1706
Henry Howard; 1670–1718; 6th Earl of Suffolk, 1st Earl of Bindon	Edward Howard; 1672–1731; 8th Earl of Suffolk	Charles Howard; 1685–1733; 9th Earl of Suffolk	Craven Howard d. 1700	Dorothy Howard	Capt. Charles Howard b. 1681
Charles Howard; 1693–1722; 7th Earl of Suffolk, 2nd Earl of Bindon	Henry Howard; 1706–1745; 10th Earl of Suffolk	Henry Bowes Howard; 1686–1757; 11th Earl of Suffolk, 4th Earl of Berkshire, etc.	Catherine Graham d. 1762	Capt. Philip Howard; 1629–1717
Earldom of Bindon extinct, 1722
William Howard; 1714–1756 styled Viscount Andover	Thomas Howard; 1721–1783; 14th Earl of Suffolk, 7th Earl of Berkshire, etc.	John Howard; 1739–1820; 15th Earl of Suffolk, 8th Earl of Berkshire, etc.
Henry Howard; 1739–1779; 12th Earl of Suffolk, 5th Earl of Berkshire, etc.	Thomas Howard; 1776–1851; 16th Earl of Suffolk, 9th Earl of Berkshire, etc.
Henry Howard; 1779; 13th Earl of Suffolk, 6th Earl of Berkshire, etc.	Charles Howard; 1804–1876; 17th Earl of Suffolk, 10th Earl of Berkshire, etc.
Henry Howard; 1833–1898; 18th Earl of Suffolk, 11th Earl of Berkshire, etc.
Henry Howard; 1877–1917; 19th Earl of Suffolk, 12th Earl of Berkshire, etc.
Charles Howard; 1906–1941; 20th Earl of Suffolk, 13th Earl of Berkshire, etc.
Michael Howard; 1935–2022; 21st Earl of Suffolk, 14th Earl of Berkshire, etc.
Alexander Howard b. 1974; 22nd Earl of Suffolk, 15th Earl of Berkshire, etc., from 2022
Arthur Howard b. 2014
