= Countess of Suffolk =

Countess of Suffolk is the title given to the wife of the Earl of Suffolk. Women who have held the title include:

- Katherine de Stafford (c.1376–1419)
- Catherine Howard, Countess of Suffolk (1564–1638)
- Barbara Howard, Countess of Suffolk (1622–1680)
- Henrietta Howard, Countess of Suffolk (died 1715)
- Henrietta Howard, Countess of Suffolk (1689–1767)
- Sarah Howard, Countess of Suffolk (died 1776)
- Julia Howard, Countess of Suffolk and Berkshire (1737–1819)
- Margaret Howard, Countess of Suffolk (1879–1968)
