= Julia Howard, Countess of Suffolk and Berkshire =

The Right Honourable; The Countess of Suffolk
- Countess of Suffolk
- Other titles: Countess of Berkshire
- Born: Julia Gaskarth; 1737; Penrith, Cumberland, England
- Died: 19 October 1819 (aged 81–82)
- Spouse: John Howard, 15th Earl of Suffolk (m. 1774)
- Issue: 5 including Thomas Howard, 16th Earl of Suffolk
- Parents: John Gaskarth

Julia Howard, Countess of Suffolk and Berkshire (1737 – 19 October 1819), formerly Julia Gaskarth, was the wife of General John Howard, 15th Earl of Suffolk and 8th Earl of Berkshire.

Julia was the daughter of John Gaskarth of Hutton Hall, Penrith, Cumberland.

She married the future earl on 2 July 1774. He inherited the earldom of Suffolk, along with the earldom of Berkshire, in 1783, on the death of a distant cousin, Thomas Howard, 14th Earl of Suffolk, who had no sons.

The couple had five children:

- Charles Nevinson Howard, Viscount Andover (1775-1800), who married Elizabeth Coke, daughter of Thomas Coke, but had no children. Charles was killed in a shooting accident, leaving his younger brother Thomas as heir.
- Thomas Howard, 16th Earl of Suffolk (1776–1851)
- Hon. John Howard (1777-1787)
- William Philip Howard (1779-1780)
- Lady Catherine Howard (1779-1850), who married Rev. George Bisset, vicar of Malmesbury Abbey, and had no children
