= Julia Howard =

Julia Howard may refer to:

- Julia C. Howard (born 1944), member of the North Carolina General Assembly
- Julia Howard, Countess of Suffolk and Berkshire (1737–1819), wife of general John Howard, 15th Earl of Suffolk and 8th Earl of Berkshire

== See also ==
- Julie Howard (born 1976), Canadian swimmer
