= Thomas Hanmer (disambiguation) =

Sir Thomas Hanmer, 4th Baronet (1677–1746) was Speaker of the House of Commons, MP for Flint 1701–1702, Flintshire 1702–1705, Thetford 1705–1708 and Suffolk 1708–1727.

Thomas Hanmer may also refer to:

- Thomas Hanmer (died 1583), MP for Flintshire (UK Parliament constituency)
- Thomas Hanmer (died c.1619), MP for Flintshire (UK Parliament constituency)
- Sir Thomas Hanmer, 2nd Baronet (1612–1678), Member of Parliament (MP) for Flint 1640 and Flintshire 1669–1678
- Thomas Hanmer (died 1701) (c. 1648–1701), MP for Ludlow 1690–1691
- Sir Thomas Hanmer, 2nd Baronet (2nd creation) (1747–1828), Welsh baronet and MP for Flintshire and Flint Boroughs
- Thomas Hanmer (died 1737) (c. 1702–1737), MP for Castle Rising 1734–1737
