= Thomas Inwen =

British brewer and politician

Member of Parliament for Southwark
- In office 1730-1743

Personal details
- Died: 19 April 1743
- Spouse: Sarah Hucks
- Children: 1+, including Sarah
- Occupation: Brewer

Thomas Inwen (died 19 April 1743), of St. Saviour's, Southwark was a British brewer and politician who sat in the House of Commons from 1730 to 1743.

== Biography ==
Inwen was a Southwark brewer. He married Sarah Hucks, daughter of William Hucks brewer of St. Giles's-in-the-Fields.

Inwen was returned as Member of Parliament for Southwark at a by-election on 23 January 1730 and was returned again at the 1734 British general election. He voted against the Administration in all recorded divisions. On 10 March 1732 he supported a bill to stop hops being imported from America into Ireland. He was re-elected at the 1741 British general election. He did not vote in the election of the chairman of the elections committee in December 1741 and the division on the Hanoverians in December 1742.

Inwen died on 19 April 1743, leaving his property in trust to his only daughter, Sarah, who married Henry Howard, 10th Earl of Suffolk.

Parliament of Great Britain
Preceded by Sir Joseph Eyles; Edmund Halsey	Member of Parliament for Southwark; 1730–1743; With: Sir Joseph Eyles 1730-1734; George Heathcote 1734-1741; Ralph Thrale 1741-1743	Succeeded by Ralph Thrale; Alexander Hume
