= Sarah Howard, Countess of Suffolk =

English countess

- Died: 27 May 1776
- Spouse(s): Henry Howard, 10th Earl of Suffolk (m. 1735; died 1745) Lucius Cary, 7th Viscount Falkland (m. 1752)
- Father: Thomas Inwen

Sarah Howard, Countess of Suffolk (died 27 May 1776), formerly Sarah Inwen, was the wife of Henry Howard, 10th Earl of Suffolk, and subsequently the wife of Lucius Cary, 7th Viscount Falkland.

== Biography ==
Sarah Inwen was the daughter of Thomas Inwen, a brewer of Southwark, and his wife, Sarah Hucks, and was distantly related to Jane Austen. She married the Earl of Suffolk on 13 May 1735. Her father's money appears to have been one of the attractions for him. The earl died in 1745, aged 39, leaving no surviving children. The earldom passed to Henry Howard, 4th Earl of Berkshire, a great grandson of the 1st Earl.

Sarah remarried, her second husband being Lucius Cary, 7th Viscount Falkland, whom she married on 10 October 1752 as his second wife; he had previously been married to Jane Butler. Thereafter, Sarah's surname became Cary, and she was known as Viscountess Falkland. Viscount Falkland had four surviving children from his first marriage and none from his second marriage.

Her will, proved in June 1776, contained bequests to a number of charitable causes, including St George's Hospital and Christ Church Hospital, as well as bequests to many individuals who were friends or servants. Her house, Widford Hall, was left to a relative on her mother's side, William Hucks. She stipulated that she should be buried at St Mary's Church, Widford, Essex, and that her grave should take the form of a pyramid. The resulting monument was designed by George Gibson and erected in 1778. Her husband, the viscount, lived until 1785.
