= Charles Churchill (British Army officer, born 1679) =

British Army General and a Member of Parliament

Lieutenant-General Charles Churchill
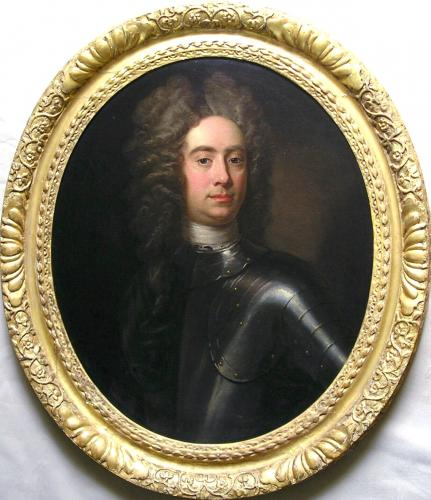
- Portrait by Jonathan Richardson
- Born: c. 1679
- Died: 14 May 1745 (aged 65 or 66)
- Military career
- Allegiance: Kingdom of Great Britain
- Branch: British Army
- Rank: Lieutenant-General
- Conflicts: War of the Spanish Succession

Lieutenant-General Charles Churchill (1679 – 14 May 1745) was a British Army officer and a Member of Parliament.

== Career ==
Born the natural (illegitimate) son of Elizabeth Dodd and General Charles Churchill (1656–1714) and so the nephew of the 1st Duke of Marlborough, Churchill spent his early career in the British Army during the War of the Spanish Succession and was then Member of Parliament for Castle Rising from 1715 to 1745.

He was despatched to Vienna in 1721 on a mission to secure the release of a "Mr Knight" who was being held in the Citadel of Antwerp.

In 1727, he was promoted to Brigadier and appointed a Groom of the Bedchamber and in 1728 King George II and Queen Caroline inspected his Regiment of Dragoons.

He was also Governor of the Royal Hospital Chelsea from 1720 until 1722. and Governor of Plymouth.

== Family ==
He was married to Catherine, younger daughter of Sir Henry Hobart, 4th Baronet; she died on 2 June 1725. Churchill had a relationship with Anne Oldfield, an English actress, by whom he had an illegitimate son, Charles Churchill (of Chalfont). He also had an illegitimate daughter, Harriet, whose mother is uncertain. Harriet married Sir Everard Fawkener and, later, Thomas Pownall.

Parliament of Great Britain
Preceded by Horatio Walpole, junior William Feilding	Member of Parliament for Castle Rising; 1715–1745; With: William Feilding 1715–1724; The Earl of Mountrath 1724–1734; Thomas Hanmer 1734–1737; Viscount Andover 1737–1745	Succeeded by William Howard; Richard Rigby
Military offices
Preceded by Joseph Johnson	Colonel of Churchill's Regiment of Marines; 1709–1713	Regiment disbanded
New regiment	Colonel of The Prince of Wales' Own Regiment of Dragoons; 1715–1717	Succeeded by Sir Charles Hotham
Preceded by Thomas Stanwix	Governor, Royal Hospital Chelsea; 1720–1722	Succeeded by William Evans
Preceded by Charles Trelawny	Governor of Plymouth; 1722–1745	Succeeded by The Earl of Dunmore
Preceded by Humphrey Gore	Colonel of Churchill's Regiment of Dragoons; 1723–1745	Succeeded by The Viscount Cobham
