= John Howard, 15th Earl of Suffolk =

British Army officer and peer (1739–1820)

General The Right Honourable The Earl of Suffolk FSA
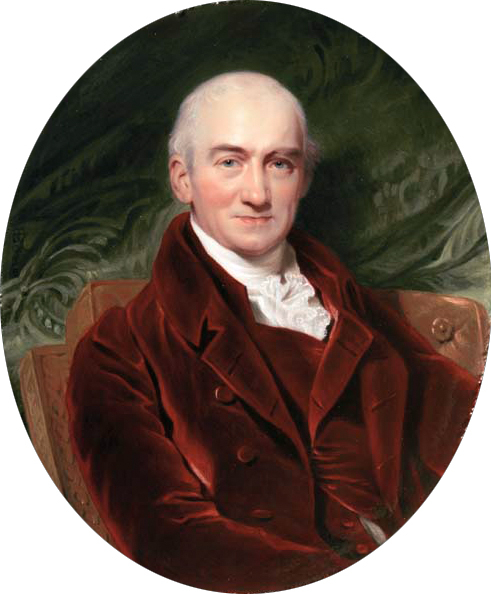
- Portrait by Henry Bone
- Born: 7 March 1739; County Kerry
- Died: 23 January 1820 (aged 80); Charlton House
- Military career
- Allegiance: United Kingdom
- Branch: British Army
- Service years: 1756–1820
- Rank: General
- Unit: 1st Foot Guards
- Commands: Brigade of Guards
- Conflicts: American Revolutionary War; Battle of Guilford Court House (WIA)

General John Howard, 15th Earl of Suffolk, 8th Earl of Berkshire, FSA (7 March 1739 – 23 January 1820) was a British Army officer and peer from the Howard family. In 1783, he succeeded a distant cousin as Earl of Suffolk and Earl of Berkshire.

== Early life ==
Howard was the third (but second surviving) son of Capt. Philip Howard of the Royal Marines and Margaret, daughter of Francis Screen of Edinburgh. grandson of Philip Howard (seventh son of 1st Earl of Berkshire). His father died in 1741. John was a Page of Honour to the Duke of Cumberland from 1745–8.

== Military career ==
In 1756, Howard was commissioned an ensign in the 1st Regiment of Foot Guards. He was promoted Lieutenant and Captain in 1760; his eldest brother, Thomas, held the same rank in the same regiment at the time.

He was promoted Captain-Lieutenant in March 1773, and Captain and Lieutenant-Colonel in May 1773.

Both John and Thomas held the ranks of Captain and Lieutenant-Colonel in the Guards at the onset of the American Revolution in 1776. Thomas was among the first to be dispatched for service in America, but he was killed in 1778 during a confrontation with an American privateer while on his way back to Britain.

John, however, was deployed to America in April 1779, where he participated in several skirmishing campaigns conducted by the Guards throughout that year. He was promoted Colonel in 1780, and succeeded Edward Mathew as Brigadier-General, temporarily commanding the Brigade of Guards in February 1780. Under his command, the two battalions of Guards embarked from New York and joined Lord Cornwallis in Charleston, South Carolina in December 1780, where Charles O'Hara returned from England and took over command of the Brigade.

Howard served in Cornwallis' southern campaign, and was wounded at Guilford Court House. Sent home with despatches on 14 June 1781, he arrived in England a month later, thus escaping the surrender at Yorktown. Later that year, he was appointed colonel of the 70th (Surrey) Regiment of Foot, which he held until 1814.

He was promoted major-general in 1787, lieutenant-general in 1789, and general in 1802. In 1814, he became Colonel of the 44th (East Essex) Regiment of Foot.

== House of Lords ==
In 1783, Howard inherited the earldoms of Suffolk and Berkshire upon the death of his cousin Thomas Howard, 14th Earl of Suffolk. He was made a Fellow of the Society of Antiquaries in 1785.

In 1800, During a debate in the House of Lords on 5 February 1807 over the proposed Slave Trade Act 1807, which would abolish British involvement in the Atlantic slave trade, he publicly supported the bill and "said a few words in support".

== Marriage and issue ==
Portrait of Lord Suffolk's wife, Julia

He married Julia, daughter of Rev. John Gaskarth, of Hutton Hall, Penrith, Cumberland on 2 July 1774. They had five children:

- Charles Nevinson Howard, Viscount Andover (13 May 1775 – 11 January 1800), married Elizabeth Coke, daughter of Thomas Coke by his first wife, without issue
- Thomas Howard, 16th Earl of Suffolk (1776–1851)
- John Howard (30 November 1777 – 1787)
- William Philip Howard (27 November 1779 – 20 April 1780), twin; died in infancy
- Lady Catherine Howard (27 November 1779 – 30 March 1850), twin; married Rev. George Bisset, without issue

His eldest son, Charles, Viscount Andover, died following a hunting accident in January 1800 near Norwich. Charles had finished shooting and handed his shotgun to his servant, but it was cocked and went off as he turned around. The birdshot lodged in his spine and lungs. He died three days later at his wife's family's estate, Holkham Hall.

He died in 1820. He was succeeded in the earldom by his second son, Thomas.

Military offices
Preceded by Samuel Stanton	Colonel of the 97th Regiment of Foot; 1782–1783	Regiment disbanded
Preceded by William Tryon	Colonel of the 70th (Surrey) Regiment of Foot; 1783–1814	Succeeded by Sir Lowry Cole
Preceded by The Lord Hutchinson	Governor of Londonderry; 1806–1820	Succeeded by George Vaughan Hart
Preceded by Sir Thomas Trigge	Colonel of the 44th (East Essex) Regiment of Foot; 1814–1820	Succeeded by Gore Brown
Peerage of England
Preceded by Thomas Howard	Earl of Suffolk; 1783–1820	Succeeded by Thomas Howard
Preceded by Thomas Howard	Earl of Berkshire; 1783–1820	Succeeded by Thomas Howard
