= Earl of Suffolk =

Title in the Peerage of England

Earldom of Suffolk held with Earldom of Berkshire
- Quarterly, 1st: Gules, on a bend between six crosses-crosslet fitchée argent, an escutcheon or, charged with a demi-lion rampant pierced through the mouth by an arrow within a double tressure flory counterflory of the first (Howard); 2nd: Gules, three lions passant guardant in pale or, armed and langued azure, in chief a label of three points argent (Thomas of Brotherton); 3rd: Chequy or and azure (Warren); 4th: Gules, a lion rampant argent (Mowbray) in the center of the shield a crescent for the difference of a second son
- Creation date: before 1069 (first creation); 1337 (second creation); 1385 (forfeit 1388–89, 1399)(third creation); 21 July 1603 (fourth creation)
- Created by: William the Conqueror (first creation); Edward III (second creation); Richard II (third creation); Richard II (third creation, restoration); Henry IV (third creation, restoration); James VI and I (fourth creation)
- Peerage: Peerage of England
- First holder: Ralph the Staller, Earl of East Anglia
- Present holder: Alexander Howard, 22nd Earl of Suffolk, 15th Earl of Berkshire
- Heir apparent: Arthur Howard, Viscount Andover
- Remainder to: Heirs male of the body, lawfully begotten
- Subsidiary titles: Viscount Andover; Baron Howard of Charlton
- Extinction date: 1074 (first creation); 1382 (second creation); 1504 (third creation)
- Seat: Charlton Park, Wiltshire
- Motto: Nous Maintiendrons ("We will maintain")

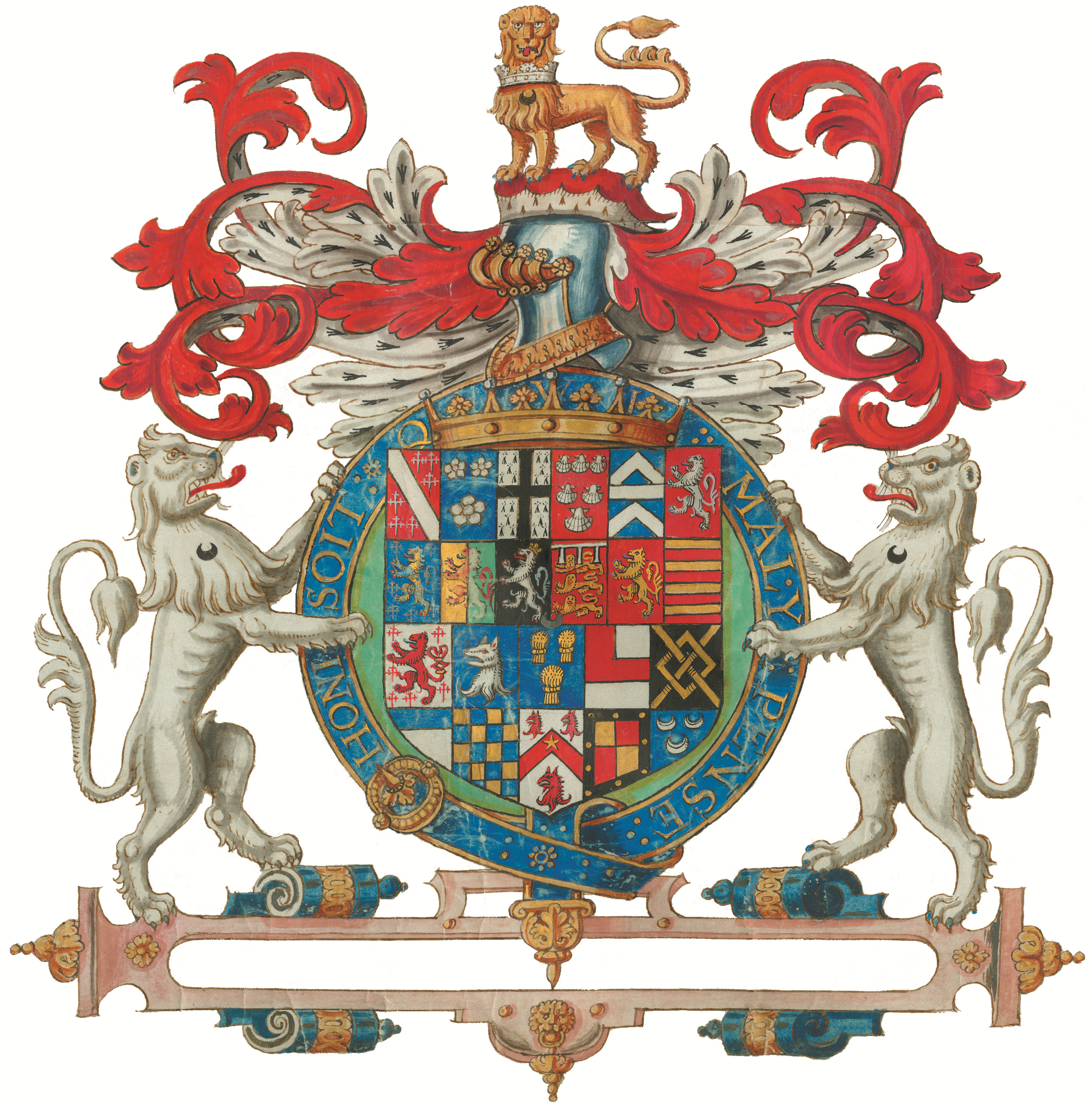
Heraldic achievement of 22 quarters of a Howard Earl of Suffolk, and Knight of the Garter (thus possibly 1st, 2nd or 12th Earl)

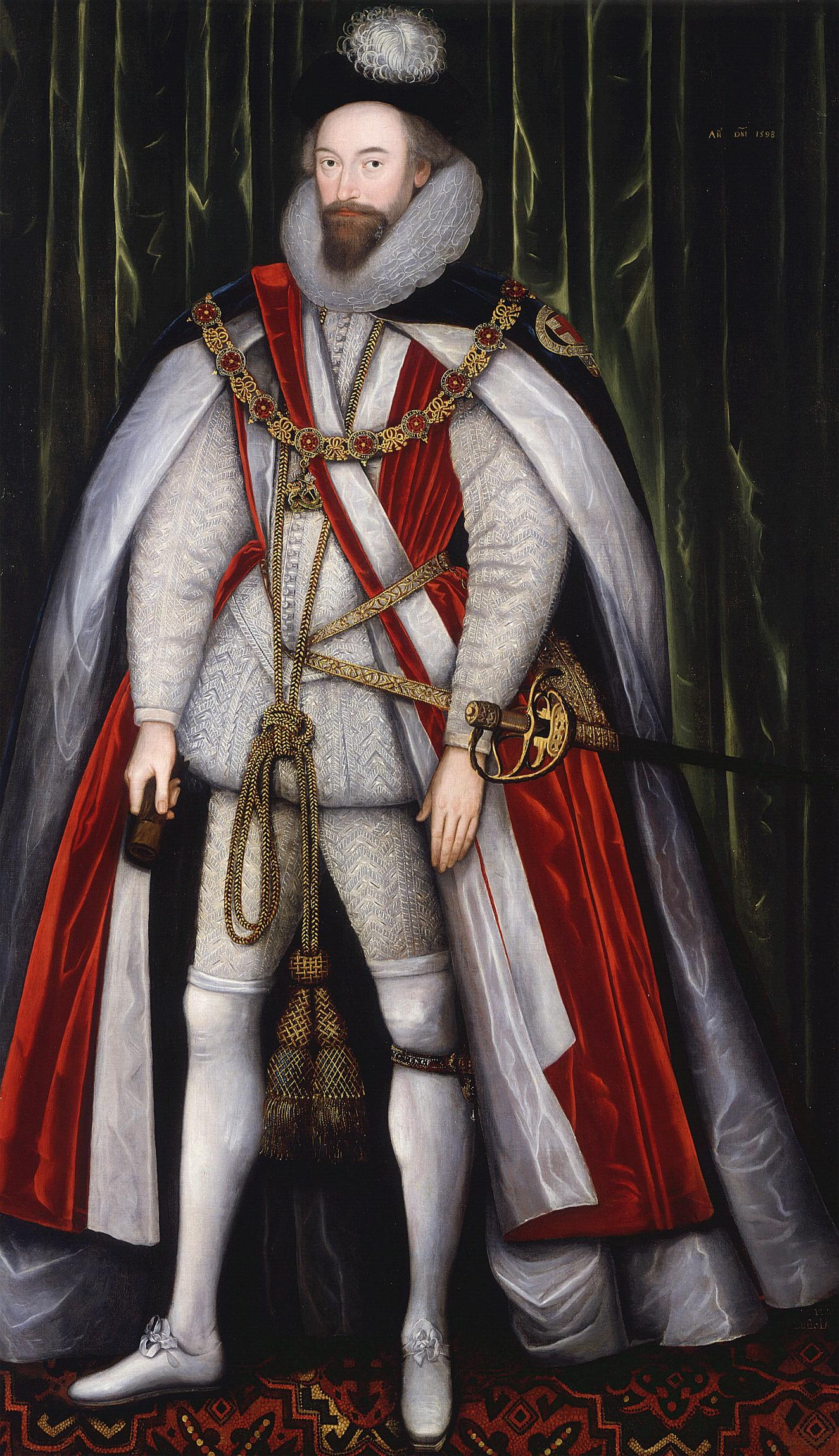
Thomas Howard, 1st Earl of Suffolk

Earl of Suffolk is a title which has been created four times in the Peerage of England. The first creation, in tandem with the creation of the title of Earl of Norfolk, came before 1069 in favour of Ralph the Staller; but the title was forfeited by his heir, Ralph de Guader, in 1074. The second creation came in 1337 in favour of Robert de Ufford; the title became extinct on the death of his son, the second Earl, in 1382. The third creation came in 1385 in favour of Michael de la Pole. (For more information on this creation, see the Duke of Suffolk (1448 creation).) The fourth creation was in 1603 for Lord Thomas Howard, the second son of Thomas Howard, 4th Duke of Norfolk, by his second wife Margaret Audley, the daughter and eventual sole heiress of Thomas Audley, 1st Baron Audley of Walden, of Audley End in the parish of Saffron Walden in Essex. Howard was a prominent naval commander and politician and served as Earl Marshal, as Lord Chamberlain of the Household and as Lord High Treasurer. In 1597 he was summoned to Parliament as Baron Howard de Walden, and in 1603 he was further honoured, at the start of the reign of King James I, when he was created Earl of Suffolk. His second son the Hon. Thomas Howard was created Earl of Berkshire in 1626.

Lord Suffolk was succeeded by his eldest son, the second Earl. He had already in 1610 been summoned to the House of Lords through a writ of acceleration in his father's junior title of Baron Howard de Walden. He later served as Captain of the Honourable Band of Gentlemen Pensioners and as Lord Warden of the Cinque Ports. On his death, the titles passed to his eldest son, the third Earl. He was Lord-Lieutenant of Suffolk and Cambridgeshire. Lord Suffolk had no sons and on his death in 1689 the barony of Howard de Walden fell into abeyance between his daughters (see the Baron Howard de Walden for later history of this title). He was succeeded in the earldom by his younger brother, the fourth Earl. He was childless and on his death, the title passed to his younger brother, the fifth Earl. He was succeeded by his son, the sixth Earl. He was a politician and served as First Lord of Trade. In 1706, three years before he succeeded his father, he was raised to the Peerage of England in his own right as Baron Chesterford, in the County of Essex, and Earl of Bindon, in the County of Dorset. His son, the seventh Earl, was Lord-Lieutenant of Essex and is also remembered as the owner of the slave Scipio Africanus. The Earl was childless and on his early death in 1722, the barony of Chesterford and earldom of Bindon became extinct.

He was succeeded in the earldom of Suffolk by his uncle, the eighth Earl. He died unmarried and was succeeded by his younger brother, the ninth Earl. His wife Henrietta Howard, Countess of Suffolk, was a mistress of King George II. On Lord Suffolk's death, the titles passed to his son, the tenth Earl. He represented Bere Alston in the House of Commons. He was childless and on his death, the line of the eldest son of the first Earl failed. The earldom was inherited by the late Earl's third cousin, the fourth Earl of Berkshire, who became the 11th Earl of Suffolk as well (see the Earl of Berkshire for earlier history of this branch of the family). He was succeeded by his grandson, the twelfth Earl (the son of William Howard, Viscount Andover). He was a politician and served as Lord Privy Seal and as Secretary of State for the Northern Department. On his death, the titles passed to his posthumous son, the 13th Earl. He died as an infant and was succeeded by his great-uncle, the 14th Earl. He was the third son of the 11th Earl. He sat as Member of Parliament for Castle Rising, Malmesbury and St Michael's. On his death in 1783, the line of the fourth son of the first Earl of Berkshire failed.

The late Earl was succeeded by his third cousin, the 15th Earl. He was the great-grandson of Colonel the Hon. Philip Howard, seventh son of the first Earl of Berkshire. Lord Suffolk and Berkshire was a General in the Army. On his death, the titles passed to his son, the 16th Earl. He represented Arundel in the House of Commons. His son, the 17th Earl, sat as Whig Member of Parliament for Malmesbury. When he died the titles passed to his son, the 18th Earl. He represented Malmesbury in Parliament as a Liberal. He was succeeded by his son, the 19th Earl. He was killed in action in the First World War. His eldest son, the 20th Earl, was a bomb disposal expert. He was killed in 1941 while trying to defuse an unexploded bomb and was posthumously awarded the George Cross. From 1941 to 2022 the titles were held by his eldest son, the 21st Earl, who as a young boy succeeded on his father's death. The 21st Earl was famously the base for Jilly Coopers character Rupert Campbell Black as featured in the multiple Television series “Rivals” based on her rutshire chronicles book series.

Alexander Howard, 22nd Earl of Suffolk, is the son of the 21st Earl and succeeded his father to the peerages in 2022.

The family seat is Charlton Park, near Malmesbury, Wiltshire.

== Earls of (Norfolk and) Suffolk, first creation ==
- Ralph the Staller, 1st Earl of Norfolk and Suffolk (c. 1011 – 1068)
- Ralph de Guader, 2nd Earl of Norfolk and Suffolk (c. 1040 – c. 1096) (forfeit 1074)

== Earls of Suffolk, second creation (1337) ==
- Robert de Ufford, 1st Earl of Suffolk (1298–1369)
- William de Ufford, 2nd Earl of Suffolk (1330–1382)

== Earls of Suffolk, third creation (1385) ==
- see the Duke of Suffolk (1448 creation)
- forfeit 1504

== Other Suffolk titles (16th century) ==
During the 16th century, the title Duke of Suffolk was created twice: 1514 (3 dukes; extinct 1551) and 1551 (1 duke; forfeit 1554).

== Earls of Suffolk, fourth creation (1603) ==
- Thomas Howard, 1st Earl of Suffolk (1561–1626)
- Theophilus Howard, 2nd Earl of Suffolk (1584–1640)
- James Howard, 3rd Earl of Suffolk (1620–1689)
- George Howard, 4th Earl of Suffolk (1624–1691)
- Henry Howard, 5th Earl of Suffolk (1627–1709)
- Henry Howard, 6th Earl of Suffolk, 1st Earl of Bindon (1670–1718)
- Charles William Howard, 7th Earl of Suffolk, 2nd Earl of Bindon (1693–1722)
- Edward Howard, 8th Earl of Suffolk (1672–1731)
- Charles Howard, 9th Earl of Suffolk (1675–1733)
- Henry Howard, 10th Earl of Suffolk (1706–1745)
- Henry Bowes Howard, 11th Earl of Suffolk, 4th Earl of Berkshire (1687–1757)
  - William Howard, Viscount Andover (1714–1756)
- Henry Howard, 12th Earl of Suffolk, 5th Earl of Berkshire (1739–1779)
- Henry Howard, 13th Earl of Suffolk, 6th Earl of Berkshire (1779–1779)
- Thomas Howard, 14th Earl of Suffolk, 7th Earl of Berkshire (1721–1783)
- John Howard, 15th Earl of Suffolk, 8th Earl of Berkshire (1739–1820)
  - Charles Nevinson Howard, Viscount Andover (1775–1800)
- Thomas Howard, 16th Earl of Suffolk, 9th Earl of Berkshire (1776–1851)
- Charles John Howard, 17th Earl of Suffolk, 10th Earl of Berkshire (1804–1876)
- Henry Charles Howard, 18th Earl of Suffolk, 11th Earl of Berkshire (1833–1898)
- Henry Molyneux Paget Howard, 19th Earl of Suffolk, 12th Earl of Berkshire (1877–1917)
- Charles Henry George Howard, 20th Earl of Suffolk, 13th Earl of Berkshire (1906–1941)
- Michael John James George Robert Howard, 21st Earl of Suffolk, 14th Earl of Berkshire (1935–2022)
- Alexander Charles Michael Winston Robsahm Howard, 22nd Earl of Suffolk, 15th Earl of Berkshire (b. 1974)

== Present peer ==
Alexander Charles Michael Winston Robsahm Howard, 22nd Earl of Suffolk & 15th Earl of Berkshire (born 17 September 1974) is the son of the 21st Earl. From birth until 2022 he was known formally by the courtesy title of Viscount Andover, one of his father's lesser titles. He was educated at Eton College and the University of Bristol. He succeeded his father to the peerages in 2022.

In 2011, as Viscount Andover, he married Victoria Hamilton, a daughter of James Hamilton, with whom he has two children, a daughter and a son. They were divorced in 2018.

The heir apparent is the only son of the present Earl, Arthur Charles Alexander Howard, Viscount Andover (born 2014).

Peerage of England
Preceded by Michael Howard	Earl of Suffolk; 2022–present	Incumbent; Heir apparent: Arthur Howard, Viscount Andover
Preceded by Michael Howard	Earl of Berkshire; 2022–present	Incumbent; Heir apparent: Arthur Howard, Viscount Andover
Orders of precedence in the United Kingdom
Preceded by The Earl of Lincoln	Gentlemen; The Earl of Suffolk and Berkshire	Succeeded by The Earl of Denbigh and Desmond

== Other family members ==
Several other members of this branch of the Howard family have also gained distinction. The Hon. Edward Howard, younger son of the first Earl of Suffolk, was created Baron Howard of Escrick in 1628. The Hon. Henry Thomas Howard, second son of the 16th Earl, sat as Member of Parliament for Cricklade. The Hon. James Howard, fourth son of the 16th Earl, sat as Member of Parliament for Malmesbury. His grandson was the explorer and politician Charles Howard-Bury. The Hon. Greville Howard, younger son of the 19th Earl, sat as Member of Parliament for St Ives. The life peer, Greville Howard, Baron Howard of Rising, is the great-grandson of the Hon. Greville Howard, second son of the 17th Earl.

Line of succession
- Charles Howard, 17th Earl of Suffolk, 10th Earl of Berkshire (1804–1876)
  - Henry Howard, 18th Earl of Suffolk, 11th Earl of Berkshire (1833–1898)
    - Henry Howard, 19th Earl of Suffolk, 12th Earl of Berkshire (1877–1917)
      - Charles Howard, 20th Earl of Suffolk, 13th Earl of Berkshire (1906–1941)
        - Michael Howard, 21st Earl of Suffolk, 14th Earl of Berkshire (1935–2022)
          - Alexander Howard, 22nd Earl of Suffolk, 15th Earl of Berkshire (born 1974)
            - (1). Arthur Charles Alexander Howard, Viscount Andover (b. 2014)
        - (2). Hon. Patrick Greville Howard (b. 1940)
          - (3). Jason Patrick Howard (b. 1968)
            - (4). Luke Thomas Jack Howard (b. 2000)
          - (5). Rory Alexander Howard (b. 1970)
          - (6). Timothy Charles Howard (b. 1973)
          - (7). Charles Edward Howard (b. 1974)
            - (8). Henry William Charles Howard (b. 2018)
  - Hon. Greville Theophilus Howard (1836–1880)
    - Charles Howard (1878–1958)
      - Henry Redvers Greville Howard (1911–1978)
        - (9). Greville Howard, Baron Howard of Rising (b. 1941)
          - (10). Hon. Thomas Henry Greville Howard (b. 1983)
          - (11). Hon. Charles Edward John Howard (b. 1986)

== See also ==
- Baron Howard de Walden
- Baron Howard of Escrick
- Baron Howard of Penrith
- Howard family
