= Henrietta Howard, Countess of Suffolk =

English courtier

Henrietta Howard
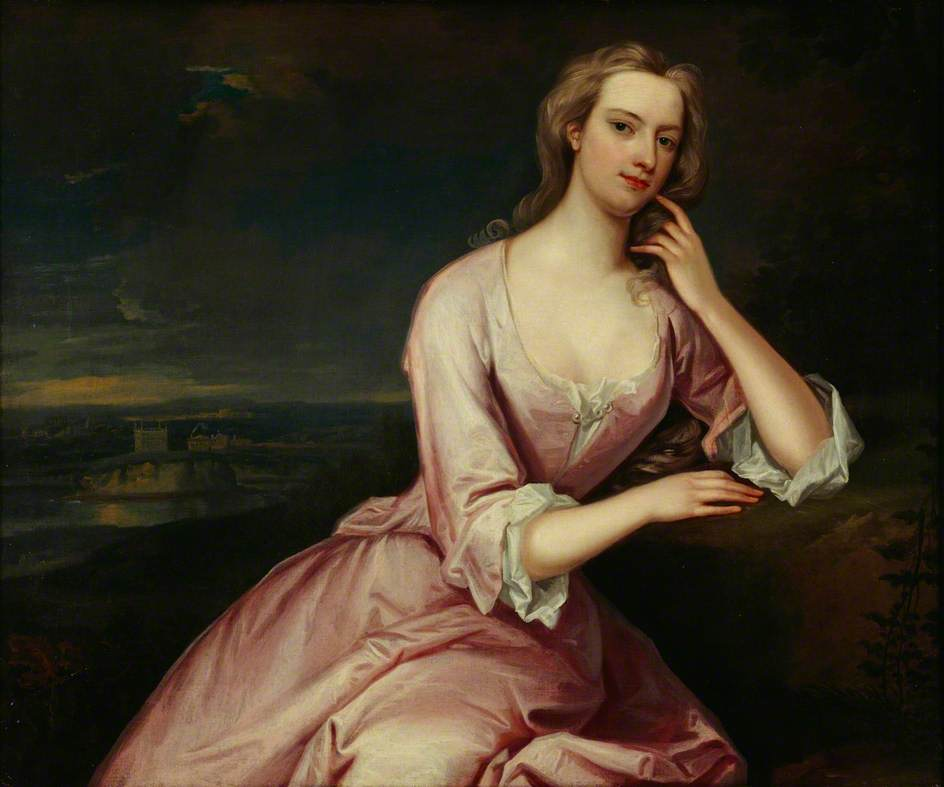
- Portrait by Charles Jervas, c. 1724
- Known for: Mistress of George II of Great Britain
- Born: Henrietta Hobart; 1689; Blickling, Norfolk
- Died: 26 July 1767 (aged 77–78); Twickenham, Middlesex
- Noble family: Hobart
- Spouses: Charles Howard, 9th Earl of Suffolk; George Berkeley
- Issue: Henry Howard, 10th Earl of Suffolk
- Father: Sir Henry Hobart, 4th Baronet
- Mother: Elizabeth Maynard
- Occupation: Mistress of the Robes to Queen Caroline

Henrietta Howard, Countess of Suffolk (born Henrietta Hobart; 1689 – 26 July 1767) was an English courtier. She is known as the mistress of King George II of Great Britain. She was the sister of John Hobart, 1st Earl of Buckinghamshire.

== Biography ==
Henrietta Hobart was born at Blickling Hall in Norfolk in 1689 one of three daughters of Sir Henry Hobart, 4th Baronet, a Norfolk landowner, and his wife Elizabeth (née Maynard). Her father died in a duel when Henrietta was aged eight, and her mother died four years later in 1701, leaving her an orphan at twelve. She then became the ward of Henry Howard, 5th Earl of Suffolk, marrying his youngest son, Charles Howard, later 9th Earl of Suffolk. The wedding was held at the church of St Benet, Paul's Wharf in London on 2 March 1706. They had one son, the future Henry Howard, 10th Earl of Suffolk. The marriage was unhappy; Charles was a physically violent compulsive gambler. She went deaf at an early age.

In 1714, the couple travelled to Hanover, hoping to ingratiate themselves with the future George I of Great Britain. Henrietta met and became mistress to his son, the future George II, and was appointed a Lady of the Bedchamber to his wife, Caroline of Ansbach. In 1723, the now Prince of Wales made a financial settlement with her husband, who was also a member of his household, in exchange for her services as a royal mistress. Queen Caroline liked Henrietta, and was happy that the King kept a mistress she found congenial, although she would occasionally administer snubs to Henrietta in public. Henrietta was noted for her wit and intelligence.

In 1723 the Prince of Wales gave Henrietta £11,500 through Trustees, with which she purchased land at Twickenham on the banks of the River Thames, and built Marble Hill House. One of the earliest British houses in the Palladian style, it was built for her by the architect Roger Morris, who collaborated in its design with Henry Herbert, 9th Earl of Pembroke, one of the "architect earls."

Henrietta and her husband officially separated around 1727, although there was no divorce; that would have required an act of parliament to be passed, with inevitable public scrutiny. Charles succeeded to the Earldom in 1731, allowing Henrietta to describe herself as Countess of Suffolk. Later, after Charles Howard's death in 1733, Henrietta remarried, in 1735, the Hon. George Berkeley, son of the Earl of Berkeley.

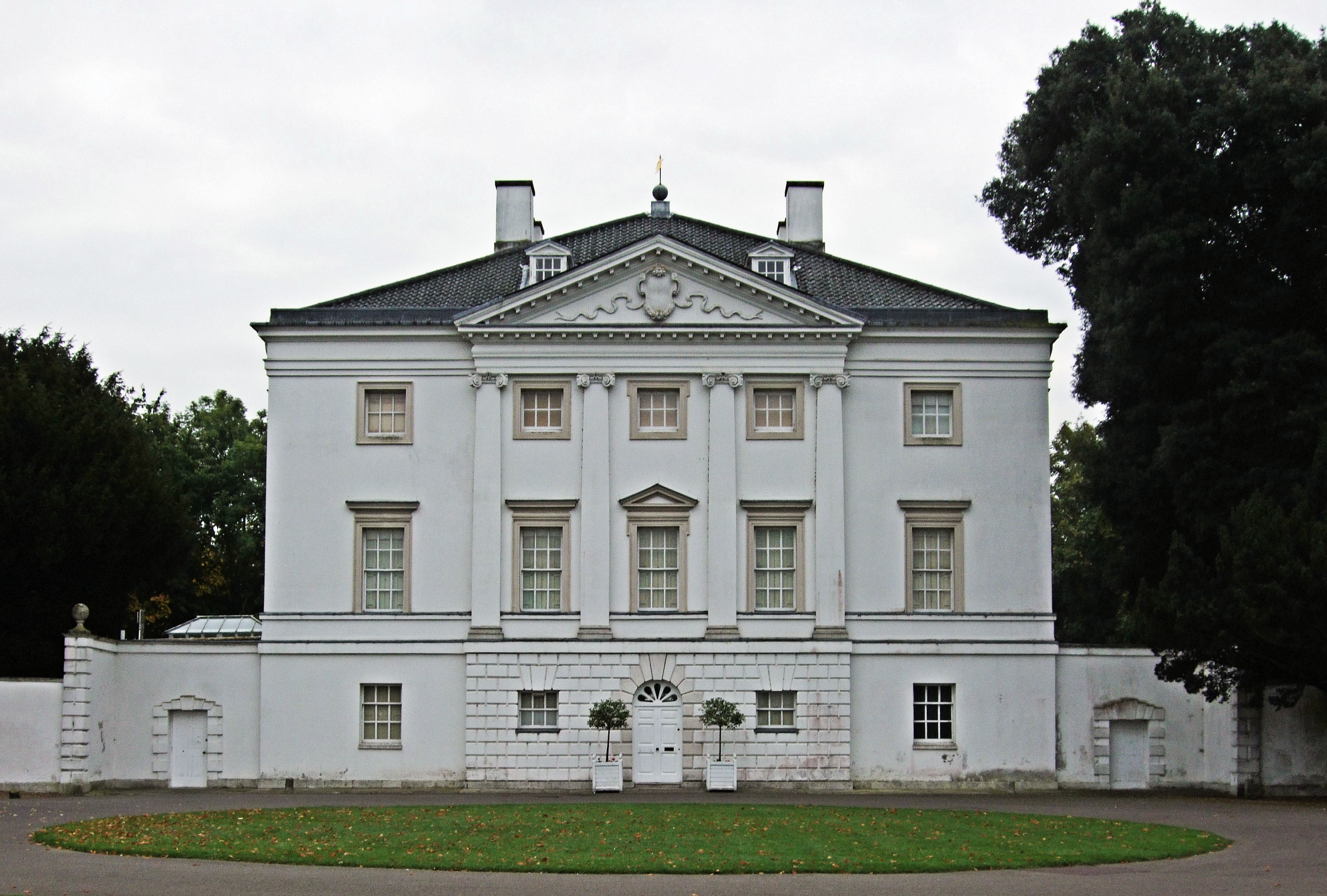
Marble Hill House, North (town) front, with pilasters

After George II moved on to a new mistress, Amalie von Wallmoden in 1734, Henrietta retired from Court. After her second husband died, in 1746, she retired permanently to Marble Hill. She formed an intellectual circle, and her many friends included Charles Mordaunt, 3rd Earl of Peterborough, John Gay, and Alexander Pope. Her correspondents also included Horace Walpole (a near neighbour in later life) and Jonathan Swift. Pope wrote of her, in his poem "On a certain lady at court":

I knew a thing that’s most uncommon
(Envy be silent and attend!)
I knew a reasonable woman,
Handsome and witty, yet a friend.

She is generally supposed to be the model for Chloe, a character in Pope's Horatian Epistle To a Lady, and is a character in The Heart of Midlothian by Sir Walter Scott, who describes accurately her ambiguous friendship with Queen Caroline.

== See also ==
- English royal mistress

== Sources ==
- Henrietta Howard: King's Mistress, Queen's Servant, Tracy Borman (2007)
- Bryant, Julius. London's country house collections (London: Scala Books in association with English Heritage, 1993)
- Bryant, Julius. Mrs Howard: a woman of reason (1688-1767) (London: English Heritage, 1988)
- "Howard, Henrietta" . Dictionary of National Biography. London: Smith, Elder & Co. 1885–1900.
- John Wilson Croker, ed., Letters to and from Henrietta, countess of Suffolk, and her second husband, the Hon. George Berkeley: from 1712 to 1767, (London: J. Murray), 1824. Online: Vol. 1, Vol. 2.

Court offices
Preceded by Elizabeth Sackville, Duchess of Dorset	Mistress of the Robes to Queen Caroline; 1731–1735	Succeeded by Mary Bertie, Duchess of Ancaster and Kesteven
