= Thomas Hanmer (died 1737) =

English politician

Thomas Hanmer (c. 1702–1737), of Fenns, Shropshire, was an English Tory politician who sat in the House of Commons from 1734 to 1737.

Hanmer was the eldest son of William Hanmer of Fenns, Shropshire and his wife Esther Jennens, daughter of Humphrey Jennens of Gopsall, Leicestershire. He was admitted at St Catharine's College, Cambridge on 25 April 1720 and was awarded BA in 1724. In 1724 he succeeded to the estates of his father. He was awarded MA at Cambridge in 1729 and was incorporated at Oxford University in 1731. He married (with £6,000), Lady Catherine Perceval, daughter of John Perceval, 1st Earl of Egmont on 9 April 1733.

At the 1734 British general election, Hanmer was returned as Member of parliament for Castle Rising on the Howard interest. He was presumably a Tory

Hanmer was the prospective heir of Sir Thomas Hanmer, 4th Baronet, but died without issue of tuberculosis on 1 April 1737.

Parliament of Great Britain
Preceded by The Earl of Mountrath; Lieutenant-General Charles Churchill	Member of Parliament for Castle Rising; 1734– 1737; With: Lieutenant-General Charles Churchill	Succeeded by Viscount Andover; Lieutenant-General Charles Churchill
