= William Howard, Viscount Andover =

British Tory politician

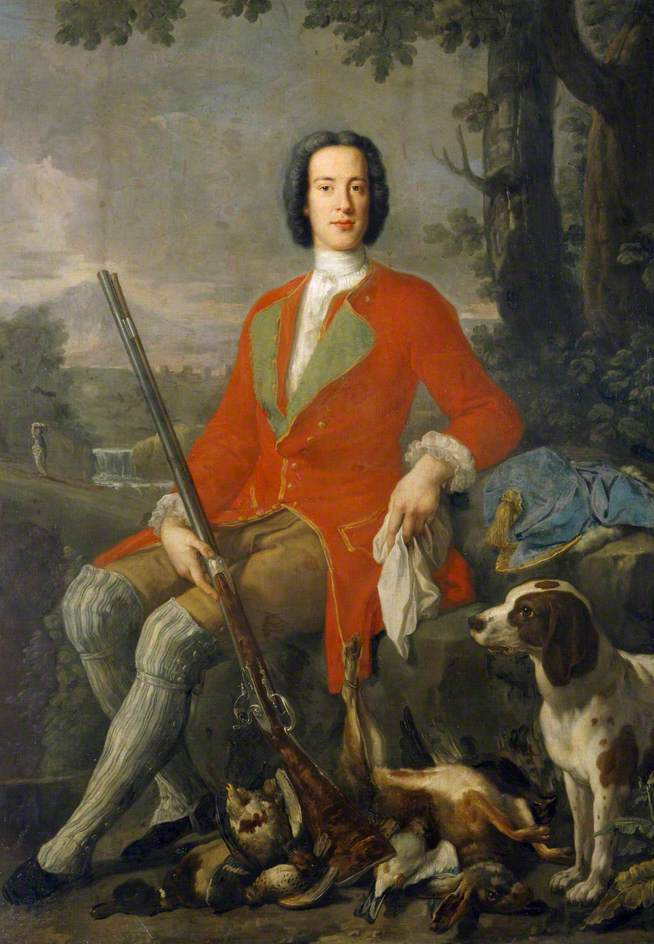
- Viscount Andover, c. 1735 by Antonio David

Member of Parliament for Castle Rising
- In office 1737–1747

Personal details
- Born: 23 December 1714
- Died: 15 July 1756 (aged 41) Fisherwick, Staffordshire
- Spouse: Lady Mary Finch (m. 1736)
- Parents: Henry Howard (father); Catherine Graham (mother)
- Relatives: Henry Howard (son)
- Education: Eton College

William Howard, Viscount Andover (23 December 1714 – 15 July 1756), of Elford Hall, Staffordshire, was a British Tory politician from the Howard family who sat in the House of Commons from 1737 to 1747.

He was the eldest son and heir of the Henry Bowes Howard, 11th Earl of Suffolk but was killed in an accident the year before his father's death; his own son succeeded as the 12th Earl.

== Early life ==
Howard was the eldest surviving son of Henry Howard, 11th Earl of Suffolk and 4th Earl of Berkshire and his wife, Catherine Graham, daughter of Col. James Grahme and Dorothy Howard, granddaughter of Thomas Howard, 1st Earl of Berkshire.

From 1725 to 1728, he was educated at Eton College.

== Career ==
Andover was returned unopposed as a Tory Member of Parliament for Castle Rising at a by-election on 16 April 1737. He voted against the Government on the Spanish convention in 1739 and on the Place Bill of 1740. In February 1741, he was one of the Tories who withdrew on the motion for Prime Minister Robert Walpole's dismissal. He was returned unopposed at the 1741 British general election but did not stand in 1747.

== Marriage and issue ==
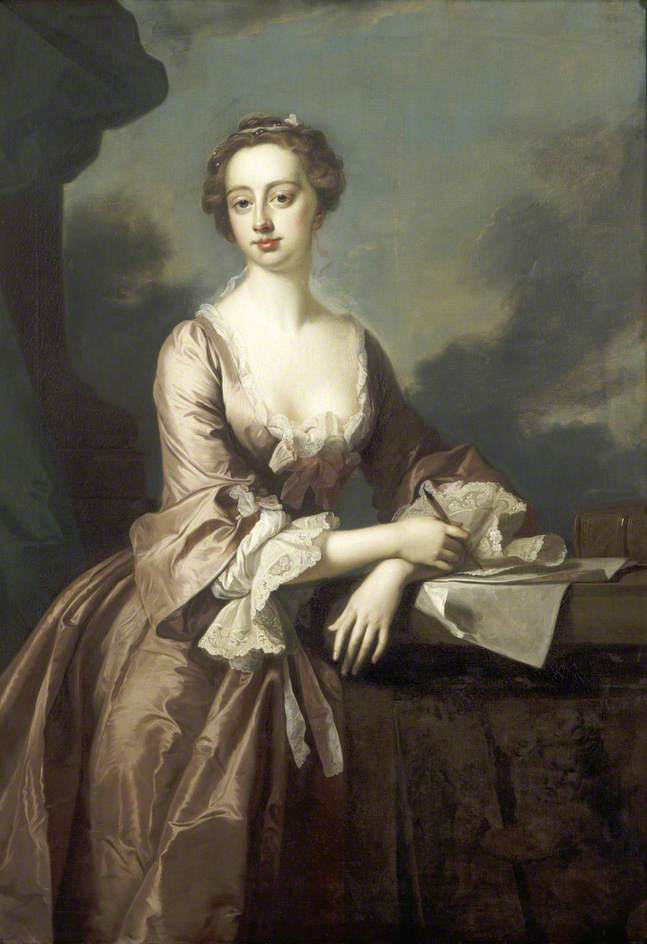
Mary Howard, née Finch (1717-1803), painting by Thomas Hudson, 1746.

Lord Andover married Lady Mary Finch, daughter of Heneage Finch, 2nd Earl of Aylesford on 6 November 1736. They resided at Elford Hall, Staffordshire, and had four children:

- Henry (16 May 1739 – 7 March 1779), who in 1757 succeeded his grandfather in the earldoms
- Hon. Catherine (born 6 July 1741 – 1826), died unmarried
- Hon. Elizabeth Mary (buried 12 June 1742), died in infancy
- Hon. Elizabeth (14 May 1744 – ), died in infancy
- Hon. Frances (27 February 1747 – 16 September 1818), married 1783 Richard Bagot (later Howard), son of Sir Walter Bagot, 5th Baronet.

== Death and legacy ==
Andover was killed in an accident on 15 July 1756. He was returning to Lichfield through Fisherwick Park when his young horses were frightened; he was thrown from the chaise carriage and landed on his head, dying instantly. He was buried at Elford.

His father died the following March and was succeeded by Andover's only son, Henry, as the 12th Earl of Suffolk and 5th Earl of Berkshire. Henry died in March 1779; his posthumous son, the 13th Earl, lived only two days.

His estates at Elford, Castle Rising, and Ashtead were eventually inherited by his only surviving child, Hon. Frances Howard. In 1783, she married Richard Bagot, fifth son of Sir Walter Bagot, 5th Baronet and brother of Lord Bagot. Richard took the name Howard upon his marriage. They had two sons who died in infancy and one daughter, Mary (9 May 1785 – 10 October 1877), who in 1807 married Col. Hon. Fulke Greville Upton, who also took the name Howard.

Mary and Fulke Greville Howard had no children and after her death in 1877 aged 92, the estates were therefore dispersed among Howard and Bagot relatives. Elford Park was left to her great-nephew Howard Francis Paget (son of Francis Edward Paget and grandson of Sir Edward Paget and Louisa Frances Bagot) and Castle Rising to Hon. Greville Theophilus Howard, younger son of the 17th Earl of Suffolk. Ashtead Park was sold by the Bagot family in 1880, along with its entire contents, including paintings by Rembrandt, Sir Joshua Reynolds, Anthony van Dyck, Sir Peter Lely, Sir Godfrey Kneller, and Salvator Rosa.

Parliament of Great Britain
Preceded by Thomas Hanmer; Lieutenant-General Charles Churchill	Member of Parliament for Castle Rising; 1737– 1747; With: Lieutenant-General Charles Churchill 1737-1745; Richard Rigby 1745-1747	Succeeded by Robert Knight, 1st Baron Luxborough; Hon. Thomas Howard
