= Henry Howard, 12th Earl of Suffolk =

British politician (1739–1779)

The Right Honourable The Earl of Suffolk KG PC
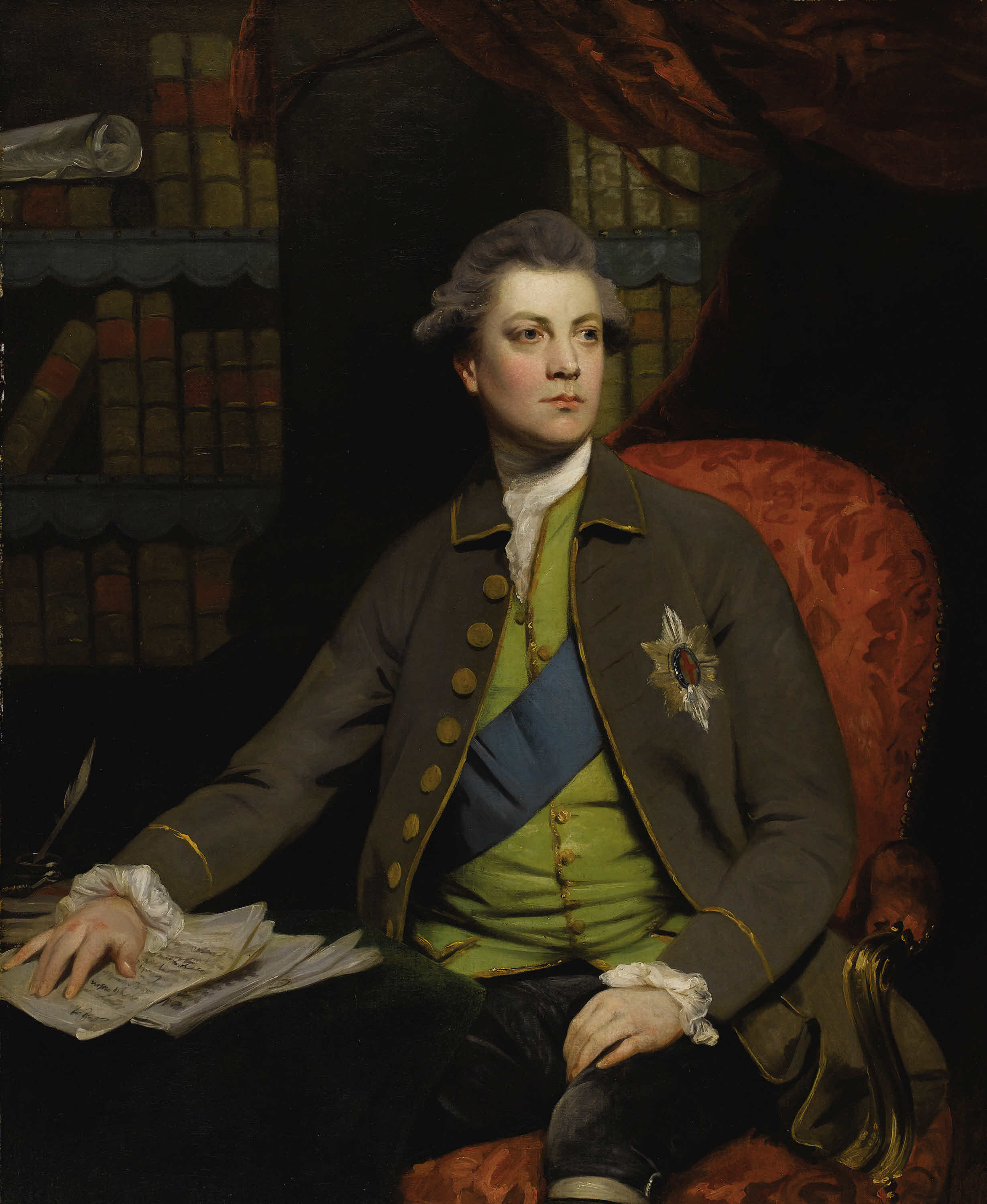
- Portrait by Sir Joshua Reynolds, 1770–1779

Secretary of State for the Northern Department
- In office 12 June 1771 – 7 March 1779
- Monarch: George III
- Prime Minister: Lord North
- Preceded by: The Earl of Halifax
- Succeeded by: The Viscount Weymouth

Lord Privy Seal
- In office 22 January 1771 – 12 June 1771
- Monarch: George III
- Prime Minister: Lord North
- Preceded by: The Earl of Halifax
- Succeeded by: The Duke of Grafton

Personal details
- Born: 16 May 1739
- Died: 7 March 1779 (aged 39)
- Spouse: Lady Charlotte Finch
- Parents: William Howard, Viscount Andover; Lady Mary Finch

Henry Howard, 12th Earl of Suffolk, KG, PC (16 May 1739 – 7 March 1779), styled Viscount Andover from 1756 to 1757, was a British politician.

== Life ==
He was the son of William Howard, Viscount Andover (son of Henry Howard, 11th Earl of Suffolk) and Lady Mary Finch, daughter of Heneage Finch, 2nd Earl of Aylesford.

Educated at Eton and Magdalen College, Oxford, he succeeded his grandfather as Earl of Suffolk in 1757. He was awarded a MA degree from Oxford in 1759 and a DCL degree in 1761. He was High Steward of Malmesbury from 1763 to 1767, and Deputy Earl Marshal from 1763 to 1765.

In 1771, Suffolk was appointed a Privy Counsellor and briefly served as Lord Privy Seal before becoming Secretary of State for the Northern Department under Lord North from 1771 to 1779. In this capacity, he secured the use of Hessian and Hanoverian mercenaries to help suppress the American Revolution. In the same capacity he helped to secure the survival of Sweden as an independent nation by counteracting Russia's plan to undo the Revolution of Gustavus III in 1772. During the 1770s he was associated with the Bedfordite faction as a member of the Bloomsbury Gang. He was made a Knight of the Garter (KG) in 1778.

Lord Suffolk died on 7 March 1779; his posthumous son Henry succeeded him for two days in August. He is buried in Charlton Church, Wiltshire, together with his first wife.

== Family ==
On 25 May 1764, Howard married, firstly, Hon. Maria Constantia Hampden-Trevor, daughter of Robert Hampden-Trevor, 1st Viscount Hampden, who died on 7 February 1767 giving birth to their only child:

- Maria Constantia Howard (7 February 1767 – 21 July 1775)

On 14 August 1777, Suffolk married, secondly, his first cousin Lady Charlotte Finch, daughter of Heneage Finch, 3rd Earl of Aylesford and Lady Charlotte Seymour, by whom he had two children:

- George Howard, Viscount Andover (September 1778 – 27 December 1778)
- Henry Howard, 13th Earl of Suffolk (8 August 1779 – 10 August 1779)

He was a lover of the famous courtesan Kitty Kennedy.

Political offices
Preceded by The Earl of Effingham	Deputy Earl Marshal; 1763–1765	Succeeded by The Earl of Scarbrough
Preceded by The Earl of Halifax	Lord Privy Seal; 1771	Succeeded by The Duke of Grafton
Preceded by The Earl of Halifax	Northern Secretary; 1771–1779	Succeeded by The Viscount Weymouth
Preceded by The Earl of Rochford	Leader of the House of Lords; 1775–1779	Succeeded by The Viscount Weymouth
Peerage of England
Preceded by Henry Howard	Earl of Suffolk, Earl of Berkshire; 1757–1779	Succeeded by Henry Howard
