= Charles Howard, 2nd Earl of Berkshire =

English peer

2nd Earl of Berkshire
- In office 1669–1679
- Preceded by: Thomas Howard, 1st Earl of Berkshire
- Succeeded by: Thomas Howard, 3rd Earl of Berkshire

Member of the English Parliament for Oxford
- In office 1640

Viscount Andover
- In office 1626–1669

Personal details
- Born: 1615
- Died: April 1679 (aged 63–64)

Charles Howard, 2nd Earl of Berkshire KB (1615 – April 1679) was an English peer, styled Viscount Andover from 1626 to 1669, was the eldest son of Thomas Howard, 1st Earl of Berkshire and his wife Lady Elizabeth Cecil.

== Early career ==
Howard matriculated at Christ Church, Oxford in 1626 and received his BA the following year. He was subsequently admitted to both Gray's Inn and Lincoln's Inn. He was created a Knight of the Bath in 1626 at the coronation of Charles I. He was elected the MP for Oxford in 1640, but was never seated as he was given a writ of acceleration to the House of Lords before the beginning of the session. He was a Royalist sergeant-major of horse in 1643, and a Gentleman of the Bedchamber to Charles II in exile, from 1658 to 1660. He succeeded his father as Earl of Berkshire in 1669.

== Popish Plot ==
As an influential member of the Catholic nobility, and a staunch supporter of the Duke of York, the Catholic heir to the throne, he was, like his cousin William Howard, 1st Viscount Stafford (who was executed for treason in 1680), an obvious target of Titus Oates and other informers during the Popish Plot. More wary of the danger than was Stafford, he fled abroad in November 1678 before any accusation of treason was made against him, and died in Paris the following April.

No credible evidence of treason was ever produced against him, although it has been argued that his sudden flight was suspicious in itself. A number of supposedly incriminating letters which he wrote in 1674 merely confirmed his political support for the future James II, who he promised to stand by "in the dark hour of his fortune", and his alleged deathbed confession to a treasonable conspiracy is now regarded as a forgery.

== Family ==
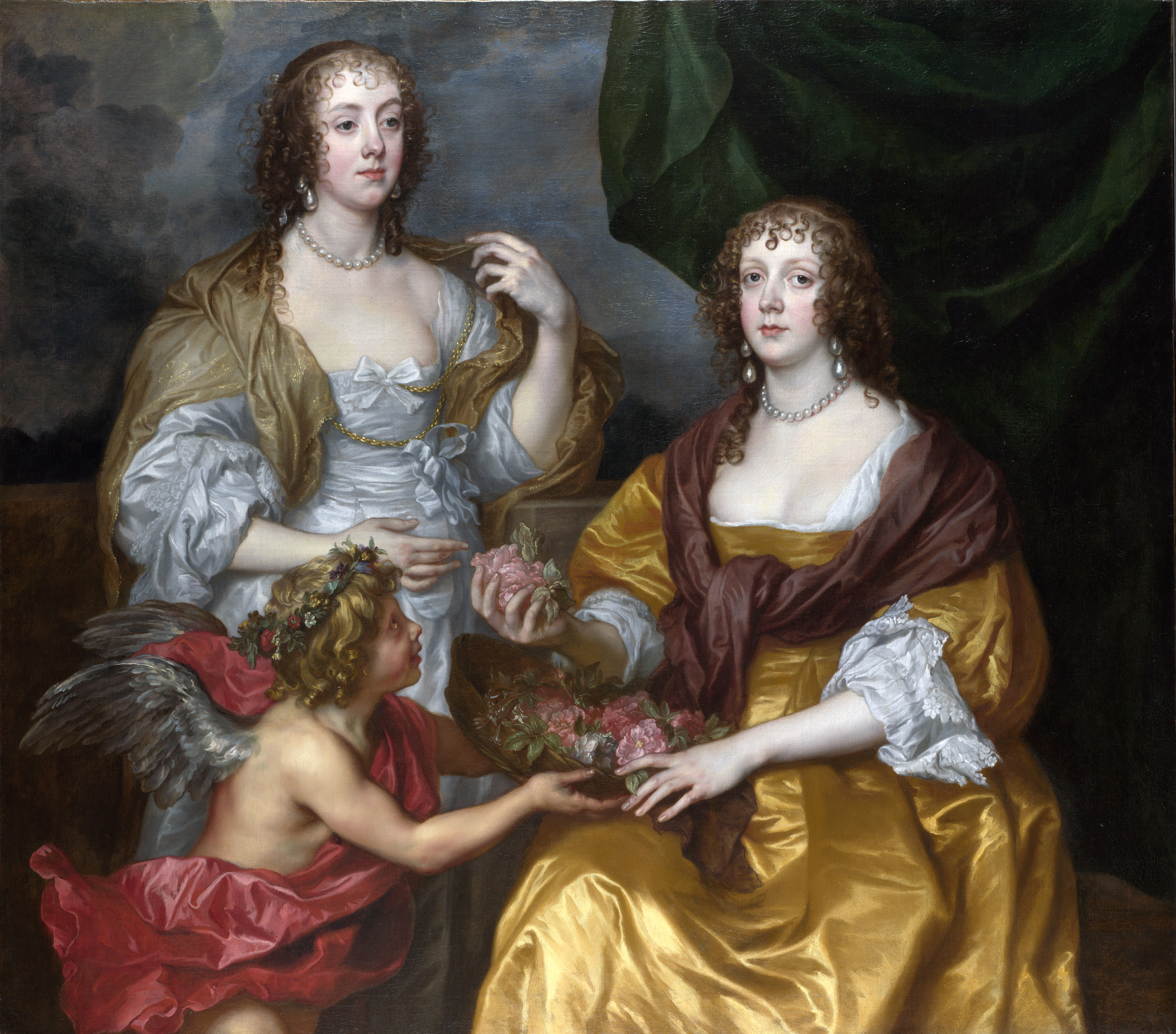
Berkshire's wife Dorothy (left), painted ca. 1637 by Anthony van Dyck.

On 10 April 1637, Howard married Dorothy Savage (c.1611-1691), daughter of Thomas Savage, 1st Viscount Savage and Elizabeth Savage, Countess Rivers. She was known as "Doll". According to Dorothy Sidney, Countess of Leicester, they married without consent or knowledge of their parents. Their children included:

- Thomas
- Henry (d. 1647)
- John (d. 1663)
- Lady Anne (c. 1650 – 19 September 1682) who married was in 1666 to Sir Henry Bedingfield, 2nd Baronet.
- Elizabeth

Having no surviving male issue, he was succeeded by his brother Thomas in 1679.

Peerage of England
Preceded by Thomas Howard	Earl of Berkshire; 1669–1679	Succeeded by Thomas Howard
Preceded by Thomas Howard	Baron Howard of Charlton (writ in acceleration); 1640–1679	Succeeded by Thomas Howard
