= Thomas Howard, 3rd Earl of Berkshire =

English peer

Thomas Howard
- Born: November 14, 1619
- Died: April 12, 1706 (aged 86)
- Occupations: represented Wallingford in Parliament, colonel of a regiment of Royalist horse, then a brigadier
- Known for: 3rd Earl of Berkshire

Thomas Howard, 3rd Earl of Berkshire (14 November 1619 – 12 April 1706) was an English peer, styled Hon. Thomas Howard until 1679. He was the second son of Thomas Howard, 1st Earl of Berkshire.

Howard represented Wallingford in Parliament from 1640 to 1646. He was colonel of a regiment of Royalist horse in 1643, and subsequently a brigadier. In 1661, after the English Restoration, he was rewarded with the sinecure office of Clerk of the Markets of the Household. Thomas inherited the earldom after the death of his childless brother, Charles in 1679. He was succeeded by his great-nephew Henry Howard, who then united the earldoms of Suffolk and Berkshire.

He was reputed to have fathered at least one illegitimate child, Moll Davies, who became an actress and mistress to Charles II, bearing him a daughter, Lady Mary Tudor who married the Earl of Derwentwater. Moll Davis was born around 1648 in Westminster and was said by Samuel Pepys, the famous diarist, to be "a bastard of Colonel Howard, my Lord Barkeshire" - probably meaning Thomas Howard, third Earl of Berkshire.

Peerage of England
Preceded by Charles Howard	Earl of Berkshire; 1679–1706	Succeeded by Henry Howard
