= Edward Howard, 8th Earl of Suffolk =

English peer

- Born: 1672
- Died: 22 June 1731 (aged 58–59)
- Father: Henry Howard
- Relatives: Charles Howard (brother); Charles Howard (nephew)

Edward Howard, 8th Earl of Suffolk (1672 - 22 Jun 1731) was an English peer.

Edward Howard was the second son of Henry Howard, 5th Earl of Suffolk, and his wife Mary Stewart. He was educated at Magdalene College, Cambridge. He succeeded his nephew Charles Howard, 7th Earl of Suffolk in 1722.

He was succeeded by his younger brother Charles Howard, 9th Earl of Suffolk.

Peerage of England
Preceded by Charles Howard	Earl of Suffolk; 1722–1731	Succeeded by Charles Howard
