= Henry Howard, 10th Earl of Suffolk =

British politician

Member of Parliament for Bere Alston
- In office 1728–1733

Personal details
- Born: 1 January 1706
- Died: 22 April 1745 (aged 39)
- Spouse: Sarah Inwen (m. 1735)
- Parents: Charles Howard (father); Henrietta Hobart (mother)
- Relatives: John Hobart (uncle)

Henry Howard, 10th Earl of Suffolk (1 January 1706 – 22 April 1745), of Audley End, Essex, styled Lord Walden from 1731 to 1733 was an English politician from the Howard family who sat in the House of Commons from 1727 until 1733 when he succeeded to the peerage as the Earl of Suffolk.

== Biography ==
Howard was the only child of Charles Howard, 9th Earl of Suffolk and his wife Henrietta Hobart, daughter of Sir Henry Hobart, 4th Baronet. He was brought up by his father and had little contact with his mother after she became mistress to George, Prince of Wales, later George II. He was admitted at Magdalene College, Cambridge.

Howard was returned as Member of Parliament for Bere Alston by his uncle, Sir John Hobart, 5th Baronet. He voted consistently against the Government. On the death of his father on 28 September 1733, he succeeded to the peerage as Earl of Suffolk and vacated his seat in the House of Commons.

Suffolk married Sarah Inwen, daughter of Thomas Inwen brewer of Southwark, on 13 May 1735, with £25,000 which allowed him to discharge the mortgages on Audley End. He died on 22 April 1745 at age 39 with no surviving issue and no brothers to whom the title could be passed. The line of Earls of Suffolk back to Henry's great-great-grandfather Thomas Howard, 1st Earl of Suffolk thus died out, and the title passed to a great-grandson of the 1st Earl (via the 1st Earl's second son Thomas), Henry Howard, 4th Earl of Berkshire.

Henry's widow Sarah remarried to Lucius Cary, 7th Viscount Falkland, on 10 October 1752. She died on 27 May 1776.

Parliament of Great Britain
Preceded by Sir John Hobart; Sir Francis Drake	Member of Parliament for Bere Alston; 1728–1733; With: Sir Archer Croft	Succeeded by Sir Archer Croft; William Morden
Peerage of England
Preceded by Charles Howard	Earl of Suffolk; 1733–1745	Succeeded by Henry Howard
