= Henry Howard, 11th Earl of Suffolk =

English peer from the Howard family

The Right Honourable Henry Howard
- The Earl of Suffolk; The Earl of Berkshire
- Tenure: 1706–1757 (as Earl of Berkshire); 1745–1757 (as Earl of Suffolk)
- Predecessor: Thomas Howard (as Earl of Berkshire); Henry Howard (as Earl of Suffolk)
- Successor: Henry Howard, 12th Earl of Suffolk and 5th Earl of Berkshire
- Born: 4 November 1687
- Baptised: 7 November 1687; St Anne's Church, Soho
- Died: 21 March 1757 (aged 69)
- Spouse: Catherine Graham (m. 1709)
- Issue: Lady Diana Howard; Henry Howard, Viscount Andover; Hon. James Howard; William Howard, Viscount Andover; Lady Catherine Howard; Hon. Charles Howard; Thomas Howard, 14th Earl of Suffolk; Hon. Graham Howard; Lady Frances Howard
- Father: Craven Howard
- Mother: Mary Bowes

Henry Bowes Howard, 11th Earl of Suffolk, 4th Earl of Berkshire (4 November 1687 – 21 March 1757) was an English peer from the Howard family.

He was the son of Craven Howard and his second wife, Mary Bowes, and baptised three days after birth at St Anne's Church, Soho.

His paternal grandfather, Hon. William Howard, was the fourth son of Thomas Howard, 1st Earl of Berkshire

On 12 April 1706, he succeeded his great-uncle, Thomas, as Earl of Berkshire. After the death of Henry Howard, 6th Earl of Suffolk in 1718, he was appointed Deputy Earl Marshal, an office he held until 1725. In 1745, he succeeded a distant cousin in the older title of Earl of Suffolk, and became Recorder of Lichfield in 1755.

== Marriage and issue ==
Suffolk married his first cousin Catherine Graham, daughter of his aunt Dorothy Howard and Col. James Grahme, on 5 March 1709. They had three daughters and six sons, but only three survived to adulthood:

- Lady Diana Howard (13 January 1710 – buried 27 January 1712), buried at Charlton Park, Wiltshire
- Henry Howard, Viscount Andover (31 December 1710 – buried 5 May 1717), died young
- Hon. James Howard (5 January 1712 – buried 24 December 1715), died young
- William Howard, Viscount Andover (1714–1756), father of 12th Earl, whose son was 13th Earl.
- Lady Catherine Howard (29 January 1716 – 18 October 1723), died young
- Hon. Charles Howard (1719 – 28 September 1773)
- Thomas Howard, 14th Earl of Suffolk (1721–1783)
- Hon. Graham Howard (27 October 1722 – 1737)
- Lady Frances Howard (17 June 1725 – buried 27 August 1730)

Because his son William was killed in a chaise accident in the previous year, he was succeeded on his death in 1757 by his grandson Henry.

Political offices
Preceded by The Earl of Suffolk	Deputy Earl Marshal; 1718–1725	Succeeded by The Earl of Sussex
Peerage of England
Preceded by Henry Howard	Earl of Suffolk; 1745–1757	Succeeded by Henry Howard
Preceded by Thomas Howard	Earl of Berkshire; 1706–1757	Succeeded by Henry Howard
