= Charles Howard, 9th Earl of Suffolk =

English nobleman and politician

Member of Parliament for Carlow
- In office 1703

Personal details
- Born: 1675
- Died: 28 September 1733 (aged 47–48)
- Spouse: Henrietta Hobart (m. 1706)
- Children: Henry Howard
- Parent: Henry Howard (father)
- Relatives: Edward Howard (brother); Theophilus Howard (grandfather)
- Military career
- Allegiance: England
- Branch: British Army
- Rank: Lieutenant-Colonel
- Units: Echlin's Regiment of Dragoons; Coldstream Guards

Charles Howard, 9th Earl of Suffolk (1675 – 28 September 1733) was an English nobleman and politician, styled Hon. Charles Howard from 1691 to 1731.

== Biography ==
The third son of Henry Howard, 5th Earl of Suffolk, he was commissioned a captain in Echlin's Regiment of Dragoons on 27 February 1703. During that year, he sat for a few months as a Member of Parliament (MP) for Carlow in the Irish House of Commons.

On 2 March 1706, he married Henrietta, who was the daughter of Sir Henry Hobart, 4th Baronet and had been placed with the Suffolk family on her father's death. Their one son, Henry, was born in 1710.

The marriage was not a happy one; Charles was a drunken and abusive husband, and neither was possessed of any great means. Charles and Henrietta travelled to Hanover to seek favour with the Prince-Elector George, who seemed likely to succeed to the English throne. They were, indeed successful in securing posts at his accession as George I in 1714; Charles as Groom of the Bedchamber to the King, and Henrietta as a Woman of the Bedchamber to Caroline, Princess of Wales. However, this brought Henrietta into the company of the Prince of Wales, whose mistress she became. Charles was by no means complacent about these arrangements, and, according to Horace Walpole, his acquiescence had eventually to be bought with a pension of £1,200 p.a. He also received an appointment as Deputy Lieutenant of Essex in 1718 and a commission as captain and lieutenant-colonel in the Coldstream Guards in 1719. He was not reappointed as a Groom of the Bedchamber after the death of George I in 1727; he had formally separated from his wife shortly before the end of the reign.

In 1731, he succeeded his brother Edward as Earl of Suffolk, and as Henrietta was now formally a Countess, she was appointed Mistress of the Robes. Suffolk died in 1733 and was succeeded by his son Henry.

Parliament of Ireland
Preceded by Edmond Jones; Robert Curtis	Member of Parliament for Carlow; 1703; With: Richard Wolseley	Succeeded by Richard Wolseley; Walter Weldon
Peerage of England
Preceded by Edward Howard	Earl of Suffolk; 1731–1733	Succeeded by Henry Howard
