= George Howard, 4th Earl of Suffolk =

English peer

- Born: c. 17 July 1625
- Died: 21 April 1691 (aged 65)
- Spouse(s): Catherine Alleyne; Anne Wroth
- Children: 2
- Father: Theophilus Howard
- Relatives: James Howard (brother); Henry Howard (brother); Frances Villiers (sister)

George Howard, 4th Earl of Suffolk (c. 17 July 1625 – 21 April 1691) was an English peer.

He was a son of Theophilus Howard, 2nd Earl of Suffolk, and was styled Hon. George Howard from 1640 to 1688/9. He was commissioned a captain in the Dutch States Army in 1646. In 1647, he became Master of the Horse to the Duke of York, and a Gentleman of the Bedchamber to the Duke in 1648. In January 1688/9 he succeeded his brother, James Howard, 3rd Earl of Suffolk as Earl of Suffolk. He married twice:

- Catherine, daughter of John Alleyne of Moggerhanger, Bedfordshire
- Anne (d. 1710), daughter of John Wroth esq. of Chigwell, Essex and widow of James Cowper esq.

He died in 1691 without male issue and was succeeded by his brother Henry. His daughter Elizabeth married Percy Kirke and his daughter Anne married William Jephson.

Peerage of England
Preceded by James Howard	Earl of Suffolk; 1689–1691	Succeeded by Henry Howard
