= Thomas Howard, 14th Earl of Suffolk =

British peer

The Right Honourable Thomas Howard
- The Earl of Suffolk; The Earl of Berkshire
- Tenure: 1779–1783
- Predecessor: Henry Howard, 13th Earl of Suffolk
- Successor: John Howard, 15th Earl of Suffolk
- Born: 11 January 1721
- Died: 3 February 1783 (aged 62)
- Spouse: Elizabeth Kingscote (m. 1747; died 1769)
- Issue: Lady Diana Howard; Margaret Southwell
- Father: Henry Howard, 11th Earl of Suffolk
- Mother: Catherine Graham

Thomas Howard, 14th Earl of Suffolk, 7th Earl of Berkshire (11 January 1721 – 3 February 1783) was a British peer, styled Hon. Thomas Howard until 1779.

== Life ==
A younger son of Henry Howard, 11th Earl of Suffolk, he was educated at St John's College, Oxford, and received his MA in 1741. Called to the bar at the Inner Temple in 1744, he succeeded his elder brother William Howard, Viscount Andover as a Member of Parliament (MP) for Castle Rising in 1747. He represented Castle Rising until 1768, when he was returned for Malmesbury; he continued there until 1774, when he sat for Mitchell. He left the House of Commons in 1779, when he succeeded his great-nephew Henry as Earl of Suffolk. He became a bencher of the Inner Temple in 1779.

Upon his death in 1783, he was succeeded by a distant cousin, John.

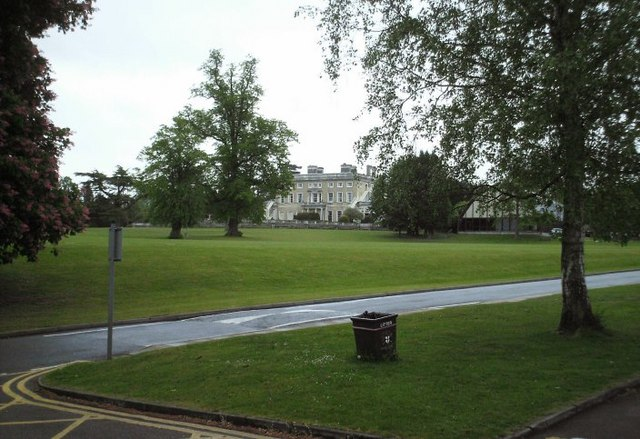
Ashtead Park, Surrey - Howard family seat to 1789

== Family ==
On 13 April 1747, Howard married Elizabeth Kingscote (b. 7 Mar 1721/22, d. 22 Jun 1769) on 13 August 1747 at Temple Church, London, by whom he had one daughter:

- Lady Diana Howard (23 July 1748 – 20 June 1816), married Sir Michael le Fleming, 4th Baronet

The earl also had a natural daughter, Margaret Southwell, who on 27 March 1794 married, in Calcutta, Sir George Abercrombie Robinson, 1st Baronet with whom she had seven sons and a daughter.

Parliament of Great Britain
Preceded by Viscount Andover; Richard Rigby	Member of Parliament for Castle Rising; 1747–1768; With: The Lord Luxborough 1747–1754; Hon. Horace Walpole 1754–1757; Charles Boone 1757–1768	Succeeded by Thomas Whately; Jenison Shafto
Preceded by Thomas Conolly; The Earl Tylney	Member of Parliament for Malmesbury; 1768–1774; With: The Earl of Donegall	Succeeded by Hon. Charles James Fox; William Strahan
Preceded by John Stephenson; James Scawen	Member of Parliament for Mitchell; 1774–1779; With: John Stephenson	Succeeded by John Stephenson; Francis Hale
Peerage of England
Preceded by Henry Howard	Earl of Suffolk, Earl of Berkshire; 1779–1783	Succeeded by John Howard
