= Henry Howard, 13th Earl of Suffolk =

British peer

Henry Howard, 13th Earl of Suffolk, 6th Earl of Berkshire (8 August 1779 – 10 August 1779) was a British peer, the son of Henry Howard, 12th Earl of Suffolk.

His father died on 7 March 1779, leaving behind his pregnant widow. The Earldom of Suffolk became dormant until she gave birth (as a daughter would not inherit the earldom, but a son would). Henry, therefore, became Earl of Suffolk upon his birth, but only survived for two days. He was buried on 23 August 1779 at Charlton and was succeeded by his great-uncle Thomas Howard, 14th Earl of Suffolk.

Peerage of England
Preceded by Henry Howard	Earl of Suffolk, Earl of Berkshire; 1779	Succeeded by Thomas Howard
