= Henry Howard, 5th Earl of Suffolk =

British nobleman

- Born: 18 July 1627
- Died: 10 December 1709 (aged 82)
- Spouse(s): Mary Stewart; Mary Ronkswood; Mary Upton
- Children: 4, including Henry, Edward and Charles
- Father: Theophilus Howard
- Relatives: James Howard (brother); George Howard (brother); Frances Villiers (sister)

Henry Howard, 5th Earl of Suffolk (18 July 1627 – 10 December 1709) was an English peer.

He was the youngest son of Theophilus Howard, 2nd Earl of Suffolk, but inherited the title in 1691 because none of his brothers left surviving sons. He inherited the title late in life after a long-lived private life as a younger son, and spent his time in the House of Lords prior to his death in 1709 without major party alignment records.

He married three times:

- By his first wife Mary daughter and heiress of Andrew Stewart, 3rd Baron Castle Stewart, he had three sons and a daughter:
  - Henry Howard, 6th Earl of Suffolk,
  - Edward Howard, 8th Earl of Suffolk, and
  - Charles Howard, 9th Earl of Suffolk
  - Diana (d. 1710), married to John Pitt of Crow's Hall, Debenham, Suffolk
- His second wife was Mary Ronkswood, a widow.
- Mary (died 1721), daughter of Rev. Ambrose Upton, canon of Christ Church, Oxford.

Mary Ronkswood advanced £500 (shortly before her marriage) towards the capital of the lead smelting enterprise of Sir Clement Clerke and his son Talbot, using reverberatory furnaces. However, her husband and her partner in the enterprise, Lord Grandison, were suspicious of the Clerkes. The result was that the enterprise was the subject of litigation, which continued until after Henry Howard inherited the earldom with its associated estates. He seems then to have stopped contesting the litigation, which was decided in favour of the Clerkes.

Peerage of England
Preceded by George Howard	Earl of Suffolk; 1691–1709	Succeeded by Henry Howard
