= Thomas Howard, 1st Earl of Berkshire =

English politician

The Right Honourable The Earl of Berkshire
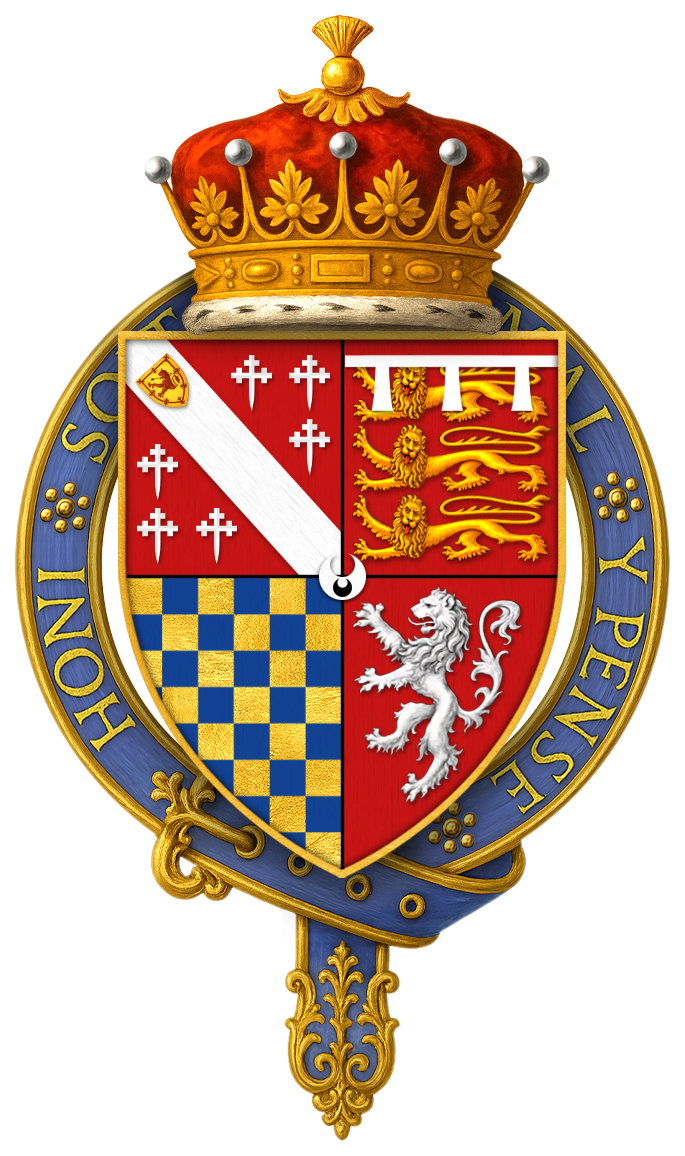
- Garter-encircled arms of Thomas Howard, 1st Earl of Berkshire
- Born: 8 October 1587; Saffron Walden, Essex
- Died: 16 July 1669 (aged 81)
- Spouse: Lady Elizabeth Cecil
- Children: Charles Howard, 2nd Earl of Berkshire; Lady Mary Howard; Thomas Howard, 3rd Earl of Berkshire; Henry Howard; William Howard; Sir Robert Howard; Lady Elizabeth Howard; Philip Howard; Lady Frances Howard; James Howard; Algernon Howard; Edward Howard; Lady Diana Howard
- Parent(s): Thomas Howard, 1st Earl of Suffolk; Catherine Knyvet.

Thomas Howard, 1st Earl of Berkshire (8 October 1587 – 16 July 1669) was an English politician who sat in the House of Commons between 1605 and 1622. He was created Earl of Berkshire in 1626.

== Life ==
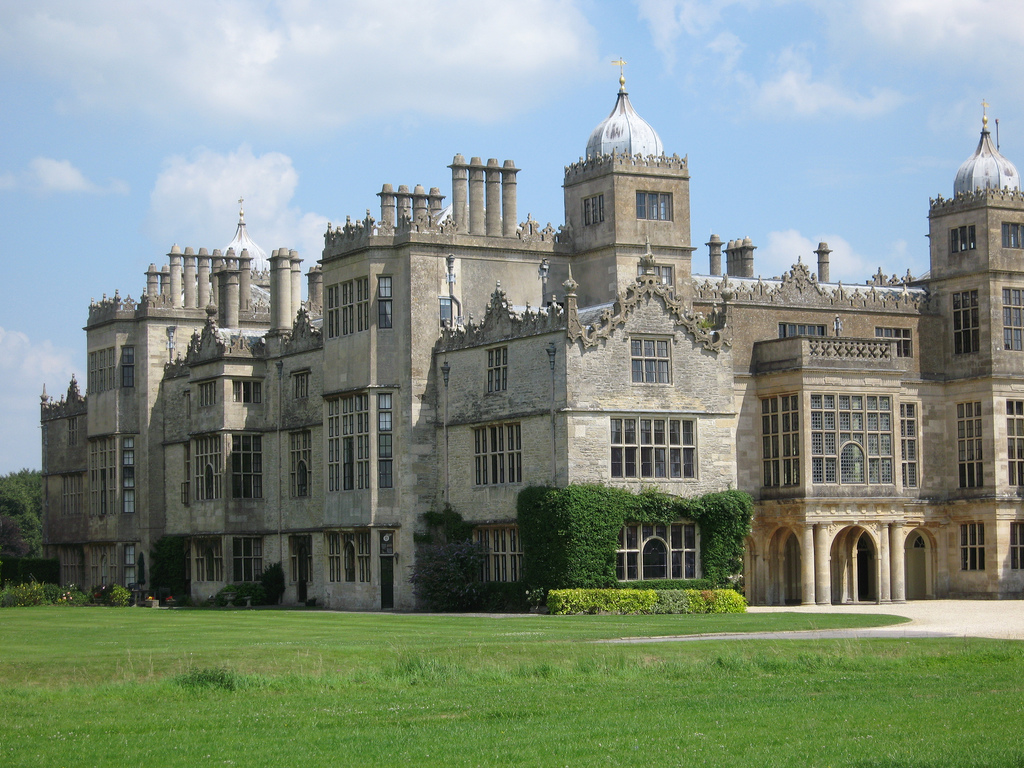
Charlton Park, Malmesbury, Wiltshire

Howard was born in Saffron Walden, Essex, the second son of Thomas Howard, 1st Earl of Suffolk and his wife Catherine Knyvet. He was educated at Magdalene College, Cambridge. He was made a knight of the Bath in January 1605, when Prince Charles was created Duke of York. He then joined the embassy of his kinsman Charles Howard, 1st Earl of Nottingham to Spain.

In November 1605, although underage, he was elected Member of Parliament for Lancaster in a by-election. He danced in The Somerset Masque on 26 December 1613.

Howard was elected MP for Wiltshire in 1614. In 1621 he was elected MP for Cricklade. In 1621 he was created Baron Howard of Charlton, Wiltshire and on 7 February 1626, he was created Earl of Berkshire. He inherited the Charlton Park estate in Wiltshire from his mother.

Howard held a large number of local offices and was Lord Lieutenant of Oxfordshire from 1628. He joined the Privy Council in 1639. At the start of the English Civil War he was imprisoned by parliament, charged with attempting to execute the king's commission of array in Oxfordshire. He was subsequently released, according to Edward Hyde, 1st Earl of Clarendon because he was an ineffectual man 'that could do no harm any where'. He joined the king at Oxford, where he became tutor to the Prince of Wales. In 1646 Howard was with the Prince of Wales in Jersey, but did not accompany him to France. Instead he went to Holland and then returned to England, where he compounded with Parliament for his estate in 1649.

After the Restoration of Charles II Howard rejoined the Privy Council. He died in July 1669, reportedly of a fall, and was buried in Westminster Abbey.

== Family ==
Howard married Lady Elizabeth Cecil, daughter and co-heir of William Cecil, 2nd Earl of Exeter in 1614. They had thirteen children:

- Charles Howard, 2nd Earl of Berkshire (1615–1679).
- Lady Mary Howard (1616–1679)
- Thomas Howard, 3rd Earl of Berkshire (1619–1706).
- Henry Howard (playwright)
- William Howard, grandfather of 11th Earl of Suffolk and 4th of Berkshire
- Sir Robert Howard (1626–1698)
- Lady Elizabeth Howard, married John Dryden
- Colonel Philip Howard (1629–1717)
- Lady Frances Howard, who married Conyers Darcy, 2nd Earl of Holderness
- James Howard
- Algernon Howard
- Edward Howard
- Lady Diana Howard (1636–1713)

Parliament of England
Preceded by Sir Thomas Hesketh; Thomas Fanshawe	Member of Parliament for Lancaster; 1605–1611; With: Thomas Fanshawe	Succeeded by Thomas Fanshawe; William Fanshawe
Preceded by Sir Francis Popham; John Thynne	Member of Parliament for Wiltshire; 1614; With: Sir Henry Poole	Succeeded by Sir Francis Seymour; Sir Edward Bayntun
Preceded by Sir Thomas Monson; Sir John Eyre	Member of Parliament for Cricklade; 1621–1622; With: Sir Carew Reynell	Succeeded by Sir William Howard; Sir Neville Poole
Political offices
Preceded by The Earl of Banbury	Lord Lieutenant of Oxfordshire; 1628–1646; With: The Earl of Banbury 1628–1632	English Interregnum
Preceded by The Earl of Banbury	Custos Rotulorum of Oxfordshire; 1628 – 1646, 1660	Succeeded by The Viscount Falkland
Honorary titles
English Interregnum	Lord Lieutenant of Middlesex; 1660–1662; With: The Earl of Dorset	Succeeded by The Duke of Albemarle
Peerage of England
New creation	Earl of Berkshire; 1626–1669	Succeeded by Charles Howard
New creation	Viscount Andover; 1622–1669	Succeeded by Charles Howard
New creation	Baron Howard of Charlton (descended by acceleration); 1621–1640	Succeeded by Charles Howard
