= Howarth (disambiguation) =

Howarth is a surname (the article includes a list of people with the name).

Howarth may also refer to:

- Howarth Glacier, in Antarctica
- Howarth of London, musical instrument manufacturers
- Howarth Bouis (born 1950), an American economist

== See also ==
- Haworth (surname)
- Hayworth
- Howard
- Howorth
- Howarthia, a genus of butterfly
- Howarth–Dorodnitsyn transformation in fluid dynamics
