= William Howard (judge) =

English Lawyer and Judge

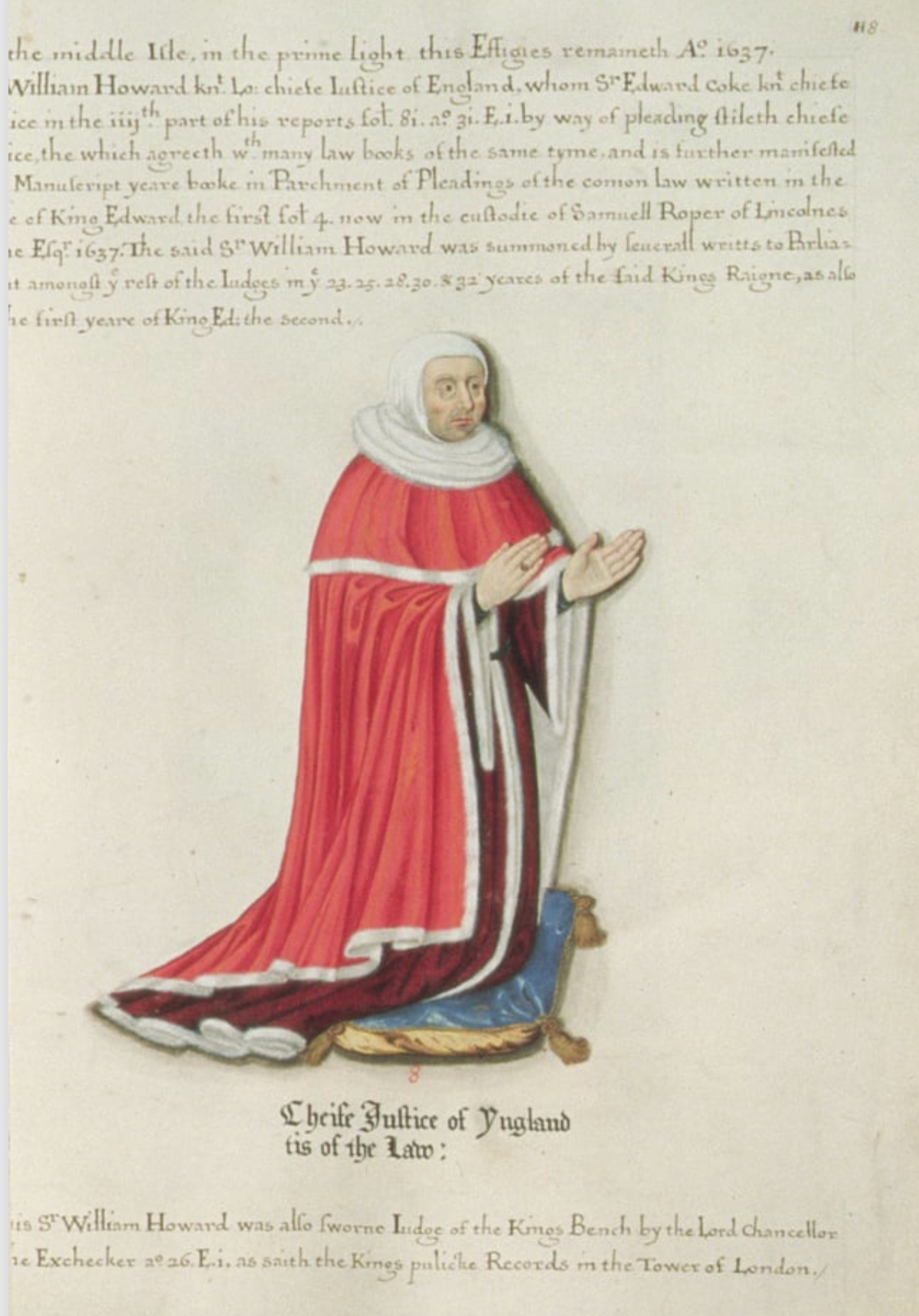
Sir William Howard in judge's robes. 1637 drawing by Henry Lilly, Rouge Dragon Pursuivant, of stained glass portrait formerly in East Winch Church

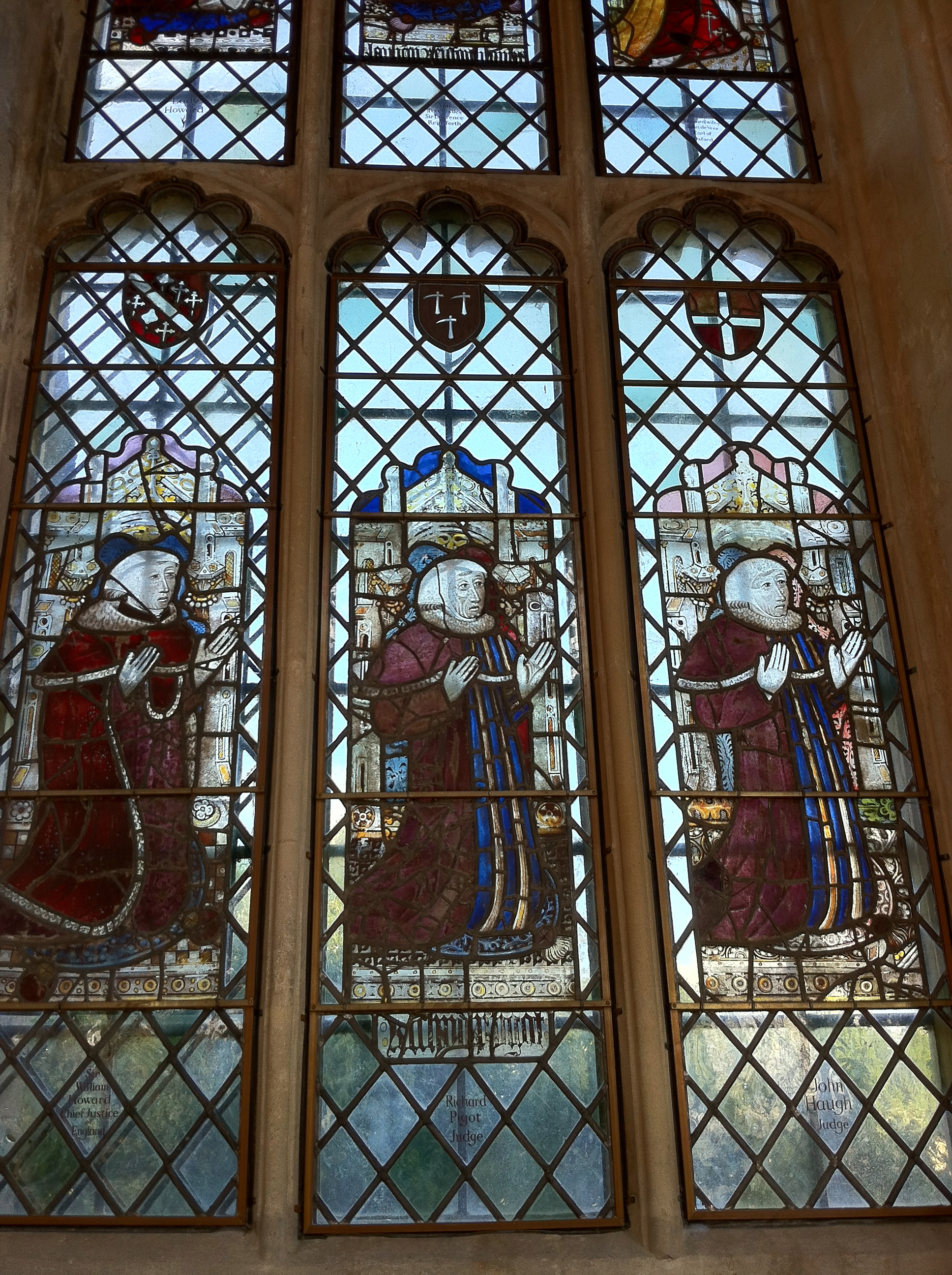
Stained glass (c.1485/1509) in Long Melford Church in Suffolk, showing William Howard (d.1308) at far left, dressed in the robes of a judge, with his arms above, with two other later judges (Richard Pigot (d.1483) Judge & Sergeant-at-Law to King Edward IV; John Haugh (d.1489))

Arms of Sir William Howard (Howard unaugmented): Gules, a bend between six cross-crosslets fitchy argent

Sir William Howard (by 1225 – 1308) of East Winch and Wiggenhall in Norfolk, England, was a lawyer who became a Justice of the Court of Common Pleas. He is the founder and earliest confirmed male-line ancestor of the House of Howard (Dukes of Norfolk), as is firmly established by historical research.

== Origins ==
A pedigree compiled and signed by Sir William Dugdale, Norroy King of Arms of the College of Arms, and dated 8 April 1665, stated that a William Howard de Howard (born 1237) was the second son of Robert Howarth of Howarth, son of William, who was himself the son of Peter de Howard of Great Howarth, Lancashire. Dugdale states that William Howard de Howard was the progenitor of the subsequently noble Howard family. William Howard was knighted in c. 1278 and that he was appointed (Chief) Justice of the Common Pleas in 1297. He married firstly Alice de Ufford, the daughter of the Justiciar and Suffolk landowner Sir Robert de Ufford. If Dugdale was correct a young William Howard left Lancashire to settle in Norfolk and practise as a lawyer perhaps at the behest of his father-in-law.

Alternatively his father may have been from the town of Lynn in Norfolk, where he may have been a merchant.

== Career ==
He is first recorded in surviving records in 1277, when he purchased land within the parish of East Winch in Norfolk, which became his main seat. As he was acting as an attorney for Norfolk clients by the later 1270s, the purchase was presumably made from his earnings as a lawyer. Howard was a serjeant-at-law in the mid-1280s and acted in the eyre courts. From 1285 he served as counsel to the Mayor and Corporation of the flourishing port town of Lynn in Norfolk. He was a Justice of Assize from 1293, and a Justice of the Court of Common Pleas from 1297 until 1307. He is depicted in a surviving stained glass window, circa 1500, in Long Melford Church in Suffolk, dressed in the robes of a judge. Despite 15th century claims by the Howard family that he became Chief Justice of the Court of Common Pleas, there is no surviving evidence to support that assertion.

In 1298 he purchased the manor house at East Winch from the Grancourt family, and steadily increased his landholding in the parish. Howard attended Parliament in 1302 as a Justice, and was on a trailbaston circuit in 1307. He died at some time before by 24 August 1308, when his replacement as a Justice of Assize is recorded, and was buried in the Church of East Winch.

== Marriages and issue ==
Howard married twice:

- Firstly to Alice de Ufford, a daughter of Sir Robert de Ufford, by whom he had issue:

- Sir John Howard I (d.1311/33), of East Winch, eldest son and heir, Sheriff of Norfolk, Sheriff of Suffolk and Governor of the City of Norwich in Norfolk, and a Gentleman of the Bedchamber to King Edward I. He married Joan de Cornwall, sister and heiress of Richard de Cornwall and an illegitimate descendant of Richard, Earl of Cornwall, the second son of King John. The son and heir of Sir John Howard I was:

- Sir John Howard II (d. post 1388), who was brought up in the king's household and served as Admiral of the Northern Fleet. He married Alice de Boys, the daughter and eventual heiress of Sir Robert de Boys, of Fersfield in Norfolk. They were the great-great-grandparents of John Howard, 1st Duke of Norfolk. His son and heir was:

- Sir Robert Howard (d.1388) (predeceased his father) of Wiggenhall and East Winch, who married Margaret Scales (died 1416), daughter of Robert de Scales, 3rd Baron Scales, by his wife Katherine d'Ufford, a daughter of Robert d'Ufford, 1st Earl of Suffolk and a sister and co-heiress of William de Ufford, 2nd Earl of Suffolk. His son was:

- Sir John Howard III (c. 1366-1437), of Wiggenhall and East Winch, the grandfather of John Howard, 1st Duke of Norfolk.

- Secondly to Alice Fitton, the daughter and heiress of Sir Edmund Fitton of Fitton Hall in the parish of Wiggenhall, Norfolk, which manor he inherited by the marriage. Only the moat of Fitton Hall survives today. Without issue
