= John de Batesford =

John de Batesford (died 1319) was an English judge.

== Life ==
Batesford was sent with William Haward as justice of assize into the counties of York, Northumberland, Westmoreland, Lancaster, Nottingham, and Derby in 1293. The commission of justice of assize was a temporary expedient intended to relieve the pressure of business, which began to weigh heavily upon the regular justices itinerant at the close of the reign of Henry III. The first commission was issued by Edward I in 1274, and was succeeded by others at irregular intervals until 1311, when the last of these special commissions was issued. The commission was in force for a year.

In 1301 Batesford was sent by the king into the counties of Southampton, Surrey, and Sussex with a special mandate empowering him to treat with the knights, 'probihomines,' and 'communitates' of these counties for a supply of grain required by the king. In 1307 he was put on the commission of trailbaston, a special commission issued for the trial of a peculiar class of criminals who went about in gangs armed with clubs (baston, baton), 'beating, wounding, maltreating, and killing many in the kingdom' for hire. In 1308 he was summoned with the rest of the justices to attend the king's coronation. In 1310 he was placed on the commission of oyer and terminer for the counties of Warwick and Leicester, for the trial of offenders indicted before the conservators of the peace. In 1311 he was sent as a justice of assize into Hampshire, Wiltshire, Somersetshire, Cornwall, and Devon, and in the same year, having quit parliament without obtaining permission from the king, he was peremptorily recalled, and ordered not to absent himself in future without the king's licence.

Between 1295 and 1318 he was regularly summoned to parliament, and from the fact that his name does not occur in the writ issued to summon the parliament of 1319, it may be inferred that he was then dead. In 1320 his executors were ordered to cause the records of the proceedings before him as justice of assize or otherwise to be transmitted to the exchequer.

== See also ==
- Hugh of Chalcombe
