= Heyworth =

Heyworth may refer to:

== People ==
- Baron Heyworth, an extinct barony in the Peerage of the United Kingdom
  - Geoffrey Heyworth, 1st Baron Heyworth (1894–1974), British businessman, public servant, and sole holder of the barony
- James Heyworth-Dunne (1904–1974), British orientalist
- Frederick James Heyworth (1863–1916), British Army officer
- David Jude Heyworth Law, better known as Jude Law (born 1972), English actor
- Lawrence Heyworth (1786–1872), English merchant
- Lawrence Heyworth Jr. (1921–2003), United States Navy admiral
- Peter Heyworth (1921–1991), American-born British music critic and biographer
- Simon Heyworth, English record engineer and producer
- William Heyworth (died 1447), 15th-century Bishop of Coventry and Lichfield

== Places ==
- Heyworth, Illinois, village in Illinois, United States

== Other uses ==
- Heyworth Building, office skyscraper in Chicago, Illinois

== See also ==
- Lawrence Heyworth Mills (1837–1918), professor of philology at Oxford University
- Hayworth
