= James Haworth =

James Haworth may refer to:

- James Haworth (politician) (1896–1976), British politician
- James M. Haworth (1831–1885), United States Army major, Indian agent and Superintendent of Indian Schools in the United States

== See also ==
- Haworth (surname)
