= Howorth =

- Pronunciation: /ˈhoʊwərθ/
- Language: English

Origin
- Language: English
- Origin: Great Howarth, Haworth
- Meaning: "settlement on a small hill"

Other names
- Variant forms: Hawrth, Hourth, Hearwarthe, Huarth, Howarth

Howorth is a surname of English Anglo-Saxon origin, most commonly found among families originating in the English counties of Yorkshire and Lancashire, especially around the village of Great Howarth near Rochdale, Lancashire, and Haworth in Yorkshire. It is found in a variety of different interrelated spellings, including Haworth, Howarth, Hearwarthe, and Huarth and derives from one of two meanings, hoh-worth, meaning settlement on a small hill, and haga-worth, settlement surrounded by a hawthorn hedge. The first recorded use of the surname in its current spelling is from 1616; earlier varieties are found as far back as Robert de Hawrth in 1200.

== People ==
- Charles Howorth (1856–1945), New Zealand artist
- Dick Howorth (1909–1980), English cricket player
- Henry Howorth (disambiguation), several people
- Jolyon Howorth (born 1945), British scholar of European politics
- Kenneth Howorth (1932–1981), British police officer killed by an IRA bomb
- Lucy Somerville Howorth (1895–1997), American lawyer, feminist and politician
- Tony Howorth (born 1938), English retired cricketer

== See also ==
- Haworth
- Howarth
