= East Winch =

Village in Norfolk, England

Coordinates: 52.71792°N 0.50738°E

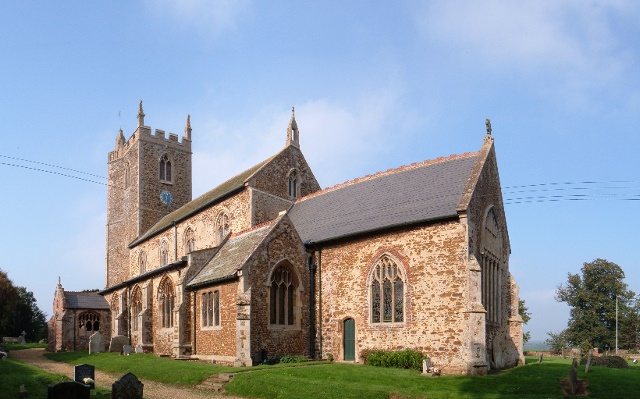
- All Saints' Church

- Location within Norfolk
- Area: 7.70 sq mi (19.9 km^{2})
- Population: 853 (2021 census)
  - Density: 111/sq mi (43/km^{2})
- OS grid reference: TF694163
  - London: 87 miles (140 km)
- Civil parish: East Winch
- District: King's Lynn and West Norfolk
- Shire county: Norfolk
- Region: East
- Country: England
- Sovereign state: United Kingdom
- Post town: KING'S LYNN
- Postcode district: PE32
- Dialling code: 01553
- Police: Norfolk
- Fire: Norfolk
- Ambulance: East of England
- UK Parliament: North West Norfolk

East Winch is a village and civil parish in the English county of Norfolk.

The village is located 4.9 miles (7.9 km) south-east of King's Lynn and 34 miles (55 km) west of Norwich.

== History ==
East Winch's name is of Anglo-Saxon origin and derives from the Old English for the eastern pasture farmstead.

In the Domesday Book, East Winch is listed as a settlement of 51 households in the hundred of Freebridge. In 1086, the village formed part of the East Anglian estates of King William I, Roger Bigod, Ralph de Tosny, Hermer de Ferrers and a freeman by the name of Rainer.

Crancourt Manor was a medieval residence of the Howard family, built as a fortified manor house. By the mid-nineteenth century, the manor was ruined apart from a single chimney stack, which remains the case today.

In May 1944, a de Havilland Mosquito of No. 23 Squadron RAF crashed within the parish after technical difficulties on a test flight from RAF Little Snoring. Both crew members (FO Charles J. Preece and FO Frederick H. Ruffle DFC) were killed.

== Geography ==
According to the 2021 census, East Winch has a population of 853 people which shows an increase from the 779 people listed in the 2011 census.

East Winch is bisected by the A47, between Birmingham and Lowestoft.

== All Saints' Church ==
East Winch's parish church was built in the Perpendicular style in the late-Fourteenth Century under the leadership of the Howard family, by the Eighteenth Century the church had largely fallen into disrepair until it was repaired under the oversight of George Gilbert Scott. All Saints' is located within the village on Church Lane and has been Grade II listed since 1960.

All Saints' features good examples of Nineteenth Century stained glass installed by Clayton and Bell depicting Christ as a shepherd and the Parable of the Good Samaritan, with a further depiction of the Resurrection by Ward and Hughes.

== Amenities ==
East Winch airfield was founded in 1986 by Colin and Peter Burman, initially for crop dusting. After this was banned in 2009 the airfield was repurposed for leisure use.

== Transport ==
East Winch railway station opened in 1846 as a stop on the Lynn and Dereham Railway between King's Lynn and Dereham. The station closed in 1968.

== Notable residents ==
- Sir William Howard (1225–1308)- English lawyer and justice
- Sir John Howard (c. 1366 – 1437)- English landowner, soldier and courtier
- Sir Osbert Lancaster (1908–1986)- English cartoonist, historian and author

== Governance ==
East Winch is part of the electoral ward of Gayton & Grimston for local elections and is part of the district of King's Lynn and West Norfolk.

The village's national constituency is North West Norfolk which has been represented by the Conservative's James Wild MP since 2010.

== War Memorial ==
East Winch's war memorial is a marble plaque in All Saints' Church which lists the following names for the First World War:

Rank	Name	Unit	Date of death	Burial/Commemoration
St1C	Robert B. Weston	HMS Queen Mary	31 May 1916	Portsmouth Naval Memorial
Pte.	Albert E. Reeve	7th Bn., Bedfordshire Regiment	25 Oct. 1916	Thiepval Memorial
Pte.	Albert Berry	1st Bn., Essex Regiment	13 Aug. 1915	Helles Memorial
Pte.	Bertie T. Edwards	1st Bn., Essex Regt.	31 May 1917	Villers-Faucon Cemetery
Pte.	James Reeve	8th Bn., Norfolk Regiment	1 Jul. 1916	Thiepval Memorial
Pte.	William J. Brown	9th Bn., Norfolk Regt.	21 Mar. 1918	Arras Memorial

And, the following for the Second World War:

Rank	Name	Unit	Date of death	Burial/Commemoration
FSgt.	Sidney A. Berry	No. 10 Squadron RAF	20 Dec. 1943	Rheinberg War Cemetery
Pte.	Frederick E. J. Craske	2nd Bn., Royal Norfolk Regiment	25 May 1940	Dunkirk Memorial
