= Howard family =

English noble family

- Coat of arms
- Country: England; United Kingdom
- Founded: 1483; 543 years ago
- Founder: John Howard, 1st Duke of Norfolk
- Current head: Edward Fitzalan-Howard, 18th Duke of Norfolk
- Titles: See list: Queen consort of England; Duke of Norfolk; Cardinal protector of England; Earl of Arundel; Earl of Surrey; Earl of Norfolk; Earl of Effingham; Earl of Nottingham; Earl of Berkshire; Earl of Norwich; Earl of Carlisle; Viscount FitzAlan of Derwent; Baron Stafford; Baron Lanerton; Baron Furnivall; Baron Howard; Baron Howard of Castle Rising; Baron Howard of Charlton; Baron Howard of Effingham; Baron Howard of Escrick; Baron Howard of Glossop; Baron Howard of Henderskelfe; Baron Howard of Marnhull; Baron Howard of Penrith; Baron Howard of Rising; Baron Howard de Walden
- Estates: Arundel Castle; Castle Howard; Carlton Towers; Framlingham Castle; Bungay Castle; Clun Castle; Naworth Castle; Charlton Park; Corby Castle; Greystoke Castle
- Cadet branches: Howards of Effingham; Howards of Carlisle; Howards of Suffolk; Howards of Penrith; Howards of Corby Castle

The Howard family is an English noble family founded by John Howard, who was created Duke of Norfolk (third creation) by King Richard III of England in 1483. However, John was also the eldest grandson (although maternal) of the 1st Duke of the first creation, Thomas Mowbray. The Howards have been part of the peerage since the 15th century and remain both the Premier Dukes and Earls of the Realm in the Peerage of England, acting as Earl Marshal of England. They reached the peak of their influence during the Tudor period, when Catherine Howard became the fifth wife and Queen consort of King Henry VIII. After the English Reformation, many Howards remained steadfast in their Catholic faith as the most high-profile recusant family; two members, Philip Howard, 13th Earl of Arundel, and William Howard, 1st Viscount Stafford, are regarded as martyrs: a saint and a blessed respectively.

The senior line of the house, as well as holding the title of Duke of Norfolk, is also Earl of Arundel, Earl of Surrey and Earl of Norfolk, as well as holding six baronies. The Arundel title was inherited in 1580, when the Howards became the genealogical successors to the paternally extinct FitzAlans, ancient kin to the House of Stuart, dating back to when the family first arrived in Great Britain from Brittany (see Alan fitz Flaad).

Thomas Howard, 4th Duke of Norfolk, married as his first wife Mary FitzAlan, who, after the death of her brother Henry in 1556, became heiress to the Arundel estates of her father Henry FitzAlan, 12th Earl of Arundel. Her son was the above-mentioned Philip Howard, 13th Earl of Arundel. It is from this marriage that the present Duke of Norfolk takes his surname of FitzAlan-Howard and why his seat is Arundel Castle. There have also been several notable cadet branches; those existing to this day include the Howards of Effingham, Howards of Carlisle, Howards of Suffolk and Howards of Penrith. The former three are earldoms, and the latter a barony.

Throughout much of English and later British history, the Howards have played an important role. Claiming descent from Hereward the Wake, the resister of the Norman Conquest who has been much celebrated in folklore, John Howard fought to the death at the Battle of Bosworth Field in defence of the cause for the House of York. The Howards regained favour with the new Tudor dynasty after leading a defence of England from Scottish invasion at the Battle of Flodden, and Catherine Howard subsequently became the fifth wife and Queen consort to King Henry VIII. Her uncle, Thomas Howard, 3rd Duke of Norfolk, played a significant role in Henrician politics. Charles Howard, 1st Earl of Nottingham, served as Lord High Admiral of the English fleet which defeated the invading Spanish Armada.

Arundel Castle has been in the family of the Duke of Norfolk for over 400 years, and it is still the principal seat of the Norfolk family. As cultural heritage, it is a Grade I listed building.

== Origins ==
See: Howarth

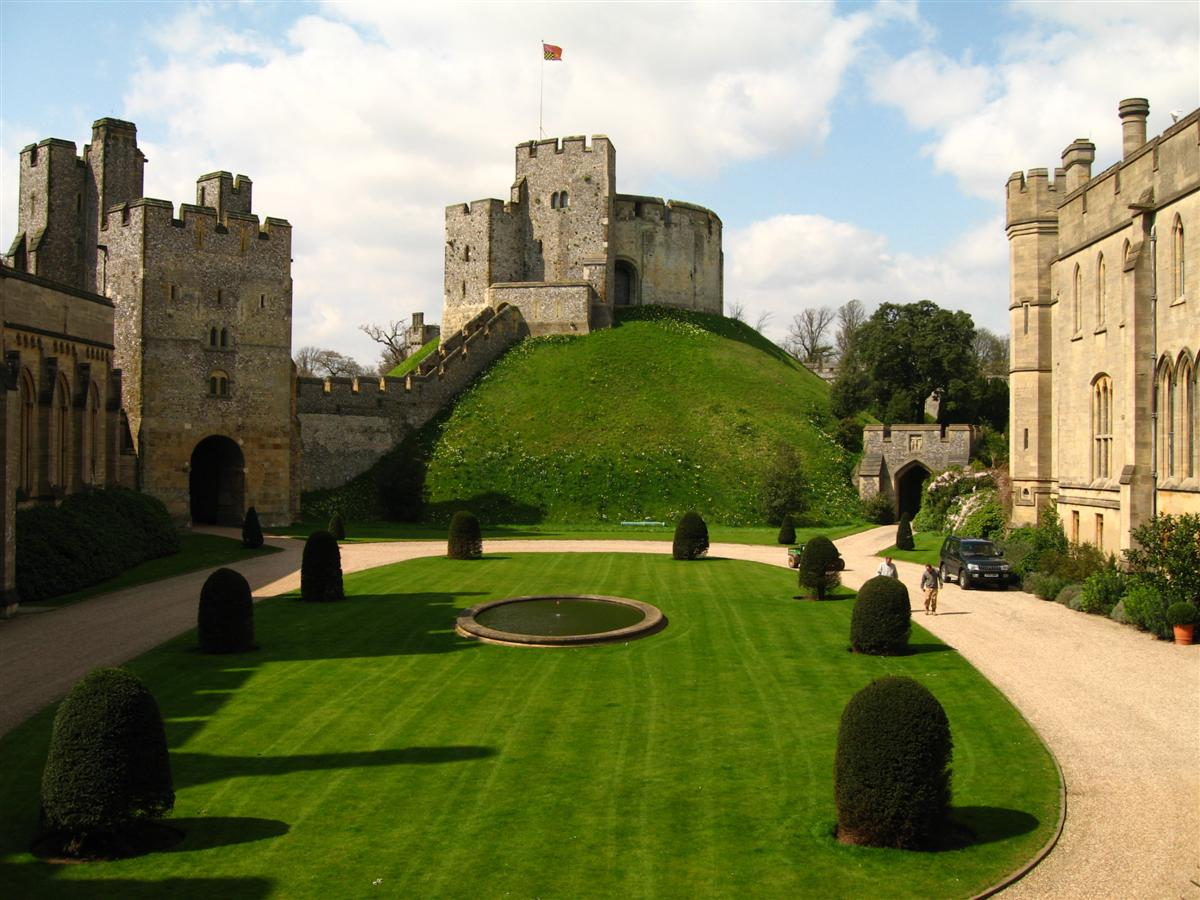
Arundel Castle, home of the Fitzalans and later the Howards

The later Howards would claim legendary descent from Hereward the Wake, but a pedigree compiled and signed by Sir William Dugdale, Norroy King of Arms of the College of Arms, and dated 8 April 1665, stated that the Howard family are descended from the Howarth [sic, Howard] family of Great Howarth Hall, Rochdale. According to Dugdale, "it is clear from above seventy deeds, without date, that the Howards, Dukes of Norfolk, do derive from the Howards Howarth of Great Howarth and that William Howard of Wigenhall… was a direct decedent of Osbert Howard de Howarth." Osbert, Dugdale wrote, had been given lands in Rochdale in return for his service as Master of King Henry I's Buckhounds.

The scroll states, in clear terms, that William Howard de Howard (born 1237) was the second son of Robert Howarth of Howarth, son of William, who was himself the son of Peter de Howard of Great Howarth, Lancashire. The early references in the 13th century Charters to Peter Howarth as “Peter the clerk of Haword” may lend credence to this theory. Dugdale states that William Howard de Howard was the progenitor of the subsequently noble Howard family. William Howard was knighted in c. 1278 and that he was appointed (Chief) Justice of the Common Pleas in 1297. William Howard married firstly Alice de Ufford, the daughter of the Justiciar and Suffolk landowner Sir Robert de Ufford. If Dugdale was correct a young William Howard left Lancashire to settle in Norfolk and practise as a lawyer perhaps at the behest of his father-in-law.

Later in 1636 the Rev. Richard James separately wrote the Iter Lancastrense, a poem on the history of Lancashire in which he mentions "Robin Howorrth, from whose familie Great Noble peers derive their progenie".

Alternatively it is sometimes stated that William Howard is son of a John (Howard) de Wiggenhale, who with other family members appears to have held land in or near Wiggenhall in Norfolk.

Sir William Howard settled in East Winch and Wiggenhall. He was a Justice of the Court of Common Pleas and was summoned as a justice to the House of Commons in the Model Parliament of 1295. Sir William's son, Sir John Howard I, became Sheriff of Norfolk and Suffolk and married Joan de Cornwall, an illegitimate granddaughter of Richard, 1st Earl of Cornwall and King of the Romans, the second son of King John. He died in 1308.

== History ==
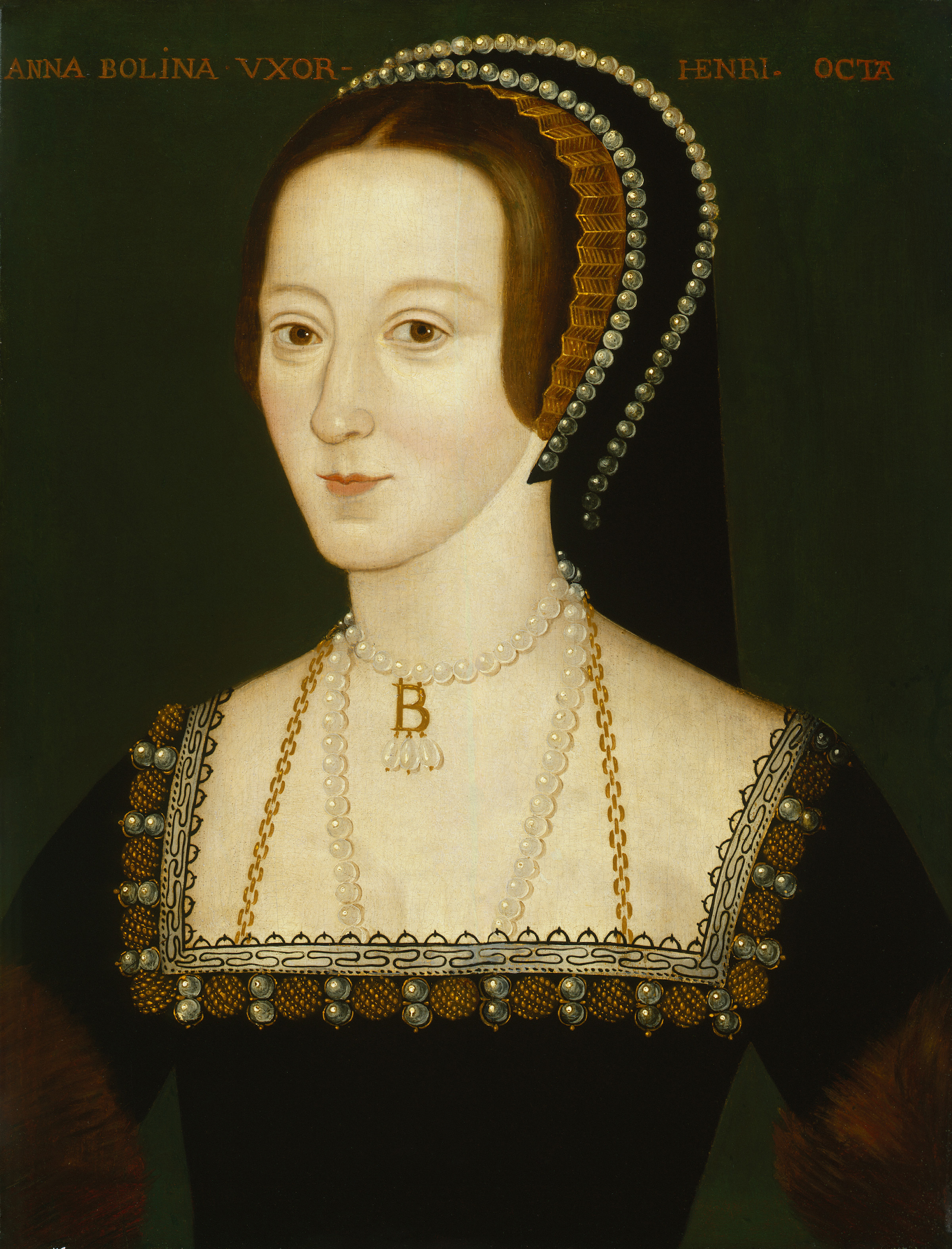
Anne Boleyn, second wife of Henry VIII

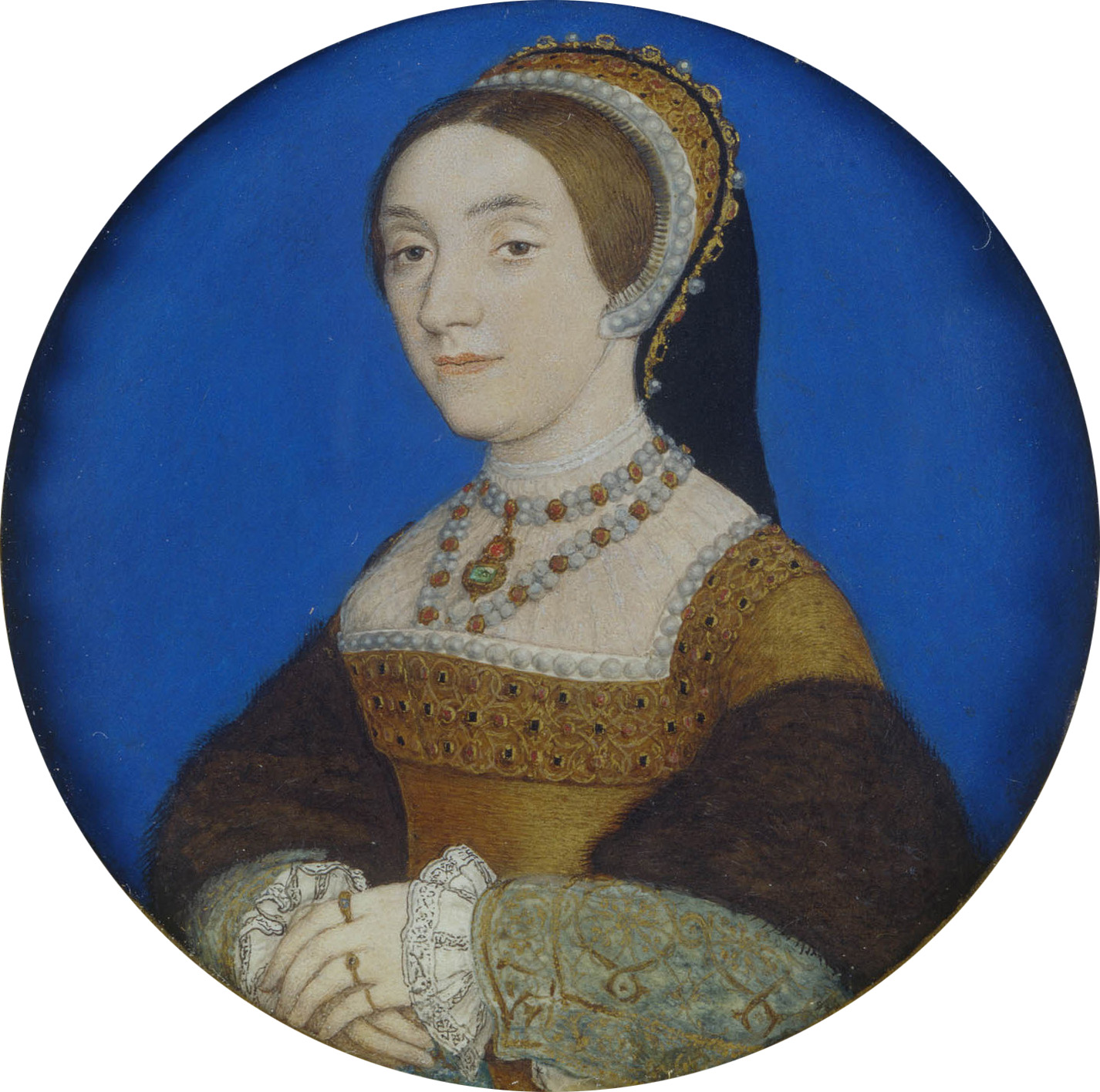
Catherine Howard, fifth wife of Henry VIII

Sir William's great-great-great-grandson, Sir Robert Howard, married Lady Margaret Mowbray, elder daughter of Thomas Mowbray, 1st Duke of Norfolk (1366–1399). The Mowbray line of Dukes died out in 1476 and the heiress of the last Duke, Anne Mowbray, died at the age of nine in 1481; after declaring her widower King Edward IV's son Richard of Shrewsbury, 1st Duke of York, illegitimate, Richard III of England created the son of Sir Robert and Lady Margaret, John Howard, 1st Duke of Norfolk, of a new creation on 28 June 1483, the 200th anniversary of the Barony of Mowbray to which he was also senior co-heir. John had previously been summoned to Parliament as Lord Howard by Edward IV. He was also created hereditary Earl Marshal. John's son and heir, Thomas Howard, 2nd Duke of Norfolk, was the grandfather of two English queens, Anne Boleyn and Catherine Howard, both wives of Henry VIII, and the great-grandfather of Queen Elizabeth I.

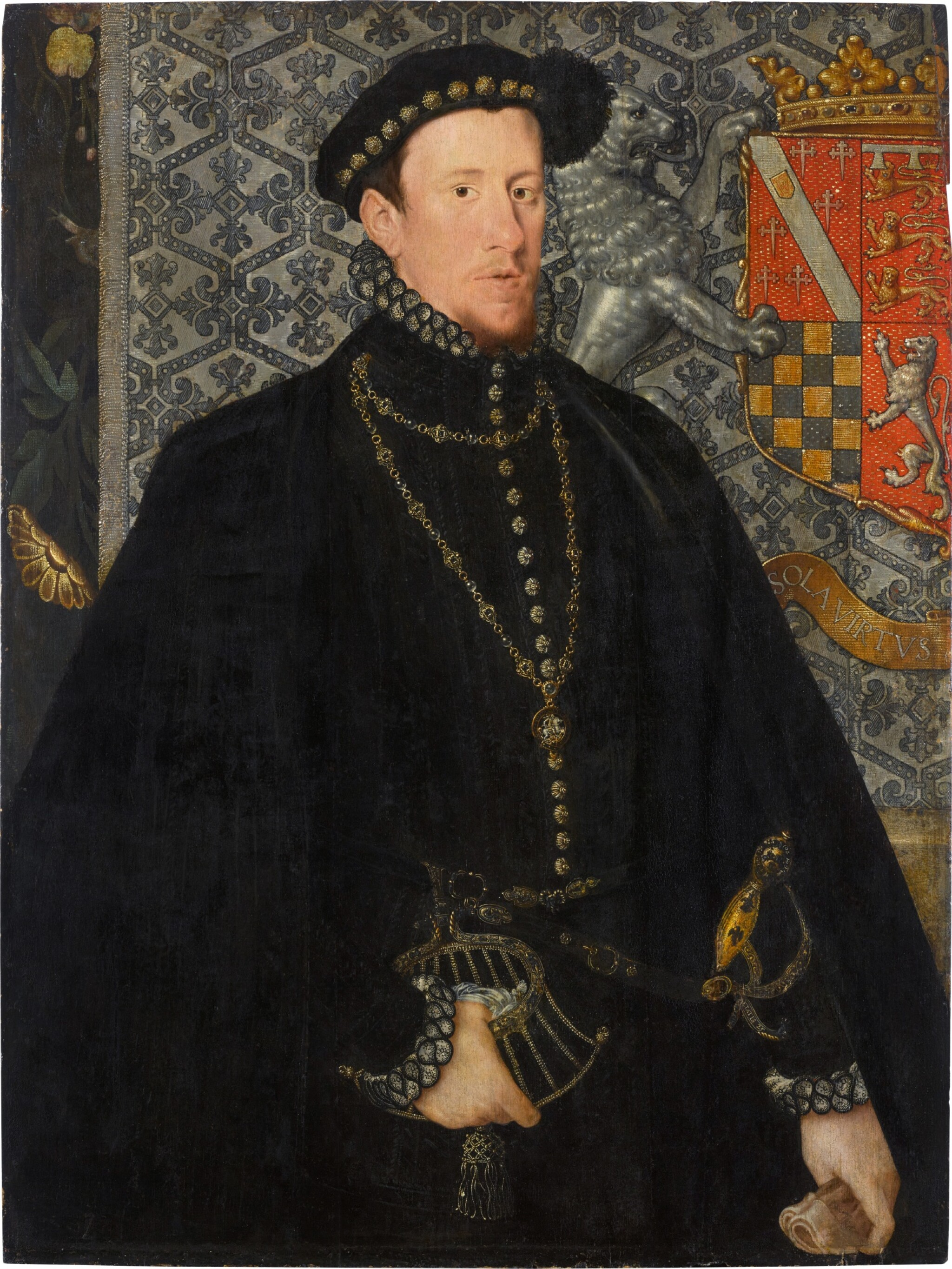
Thomas Howard, 4th Duke of Norfolk, a Roman Catholic executed for treason in June 1572 after it was discovered that he had been plotting against the Queen Elizabeth I to overthrow her, facilitate the accession to the English throne of Mary I Stewart, Queen of Scots, and after marrying her and becoming King Consort, re-establish with Mary the Catholic rule in England.

The Howard family became one of the foremost recusant families due to their continued adherence to Roman Catholicism throughout the English Reformation and its aftermath. Four members of the family in a row fell from grace or were convicted and imprisoned because of their Catholic beliefs: Thomas Howard, 3rd Duke of Norfolk and his son Henry Howard, Earl of Surrey were imprisoned in late 1546, accused of being involved in a plot to usurp the crown from Henry VIII's son, Prince Edward (future Edward VI) and thus reverse the Reformation and return the English Church to papal jurisdiction. Both the 3rd Duke and his son were tried for treason and sentenced to death; Surrey was only executed in January 1547 while his father was saved from the same fate by the death of Henry VIII, although he remained imprisoned in the Tower of London throughout the reign of Edward VI. The elderly 3rd Duke was freed early in the reign of the Catholic Queen Mary I in 1553 but died the following year and the Dukedom was inherited by her grandson and son of Surrey, Thomas, who became the 4th Duke. The 4th Duke, who despite having received a Protestant education as a child was a Catholic, was imprisoned in 1569 on suspicion of involvement in the Rebellion of the Catholic earls of northern England, being released in August 1570 after insufficient evidence was found against him. However, in 1571, the Duke would participate in the Ridolfi Plot to overthrow, and possibly also assassinate Elizabeth I, and replace her with Mary I Stewart, Queen of Scots, to marry her and then restore Catholicism in England. Norfolk was arrested in September of that same year when his participation in the plot was discovered. The Duke was tried for high treason and sentenced to death in January 1572, and executed in June of that year. Norfolk's son, Philip Howard, 13th Earl of Arundel was imprisoned in the Tower of London for his Catholicism in 1585, remaining there for over ten years until he fell ill with dysentery and he died in October 1595. It became a tradition among the Howards to suffer for being Catholics.

Both the Duchy and Earl Marshalship have been the subject of repeated attainders and restorations in the 15th to 17th centuries. Before Charles II restored the titles for good, the Howards had inherited the ancient title of Earl of Arundel through an heiress, and formed additional branches that have continued to this day.

A branch of the Howard family has been seated at Castle Howard, one of England's most magnificent country houses, for over 300 years.

In order of genealogical seniority:

- the Barons Howard of Penrith descend from a younger brother of the 12th Duke;
- the Earls of Suffolk and Berkshire descend from the 2nd son of the 4th Duke;
- the Earls of Carlisle descend from the third son of the 4th Duke;
- the Earls of Effingham descend from the fourth son of the 2nd Duke, who was Lord High Admiral and whose son was commander in chief against the Spanish Armada. (Curiously, this line was excluded from eligibility to inherit on the restoration of the Dukedom).

== Arms of the Howard family ==
See: Gallery of Howard Arms

The Howard family's original arms were the white bend on red with the crosslets. On marrying the heiress of the dukes of Norfolk, the first Howard duke of Norfolk quartered his arms with those of Thomas of Brotherton 1st Earl of Norfolk, son of King Edward I Longshanks as well as the Mowbray arms. Starting with the 2nd Duke of Norfolk, the Howards added in the 3rd quarter the checkered blue and gold of the Warren Earls of Surrey, whom they became heirs of. Philip Howard was deprived of the dukedom of Norfolk, which was under attainer, but inherited the earldom of Arundel. His descendants used the gold lion on red of the Fitzalan Earls of Arundel in the 4th quarter.

Howard Arms unaugmented (pre-1513)

Arms of Thomas of Brotherton (1300 † 1338), Earl of Norfolk, son of Edward I Longshanks, from whom all the Dukes of Norfolk are descended.Gules, three lions passant guardant in pale or armed and langued azure a label of three points argent.

Arms of John Howard, 1st Howard Duke of Norfolk, showing the unaugmented Howard Arms (I & IV), quartering the arms of Thomas of Brotherton (II) and the arms of Mowbray (III): Gules, a lion rampant argent.

Arms of Mowbray

The coat of arms used by the Howard Family. The Scots shield is an augmentation, see below. Gules, on a bend between six cross-crosslets fitchy argent an escutcheon or charged with a demi-lion rampant pierced through the mouth by an arrow within a double tressure flory counterflory of the first.

Augmentation to the arms of Thomas Howard, 2nd Duke of Norfolk for his services at the Battle of Flodden (1513).

Arms of the Warenne Family, Earls of Surrey.

Coat of arms of the Howard Dukes of Norfolk, starting with Thomas Howard, 2nd Duke of Norfolk.Quarterly of 4: 1: Howard, with augmentation of honour; 2: Plantagenet, arms of Thomas of Brotherton, 1st Earl of Norfolk; 3: Chequy or and azure (de Warenne, Earl of Surrey); 4: Mowbray

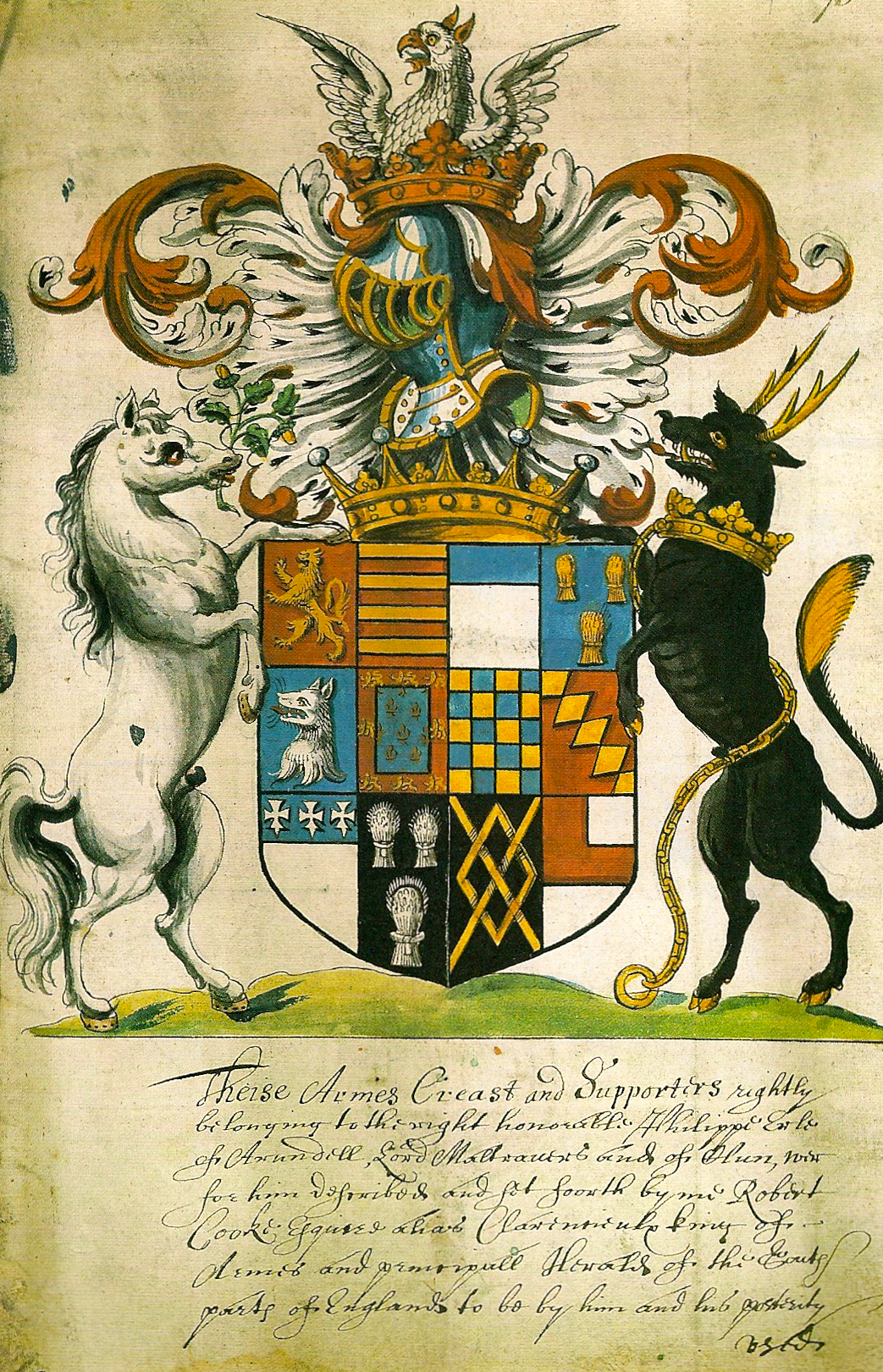
Confirmation of arms, crest and supporters, dated 28 May 1580, by Robert Cooke, Clarenceux to Philip Howard, 20th Earl of Arundel, omitting Howard arms and quarterings as the Dukedom of Norfolk was under attainder.

Usual quarterings of Howard, Dukes of Norfolk after 1842: with FitzAlan (Gules a lion rampant or) in the 4th quarter, in place of Mowbray; in 1842 the future 14th Duke adopted as a prefix the additional surname of FitzAlan (of Arundel Castle, feudal Earls of Arundel, Barons Mowbray, etc.), whose heiress in 1555 had married Thomas Howard, 4th Duke of Norfolk.

FitzAlan, Earls of Arundel.

Arms of the arms of Henry Howard, Earle of Surrey, for which he was attainted. The main offense was bearing the arms of Edward the Confessor (5th quarter), which only the monarch was allowed. Surrey was beheaded on 19 January 1547 on a charge of treasonably quartering the royal arms.

Coat of arms of Howard Earls of Suffolk, with a crescent for difference for a second son.

Coat of arms of Howard Earl of Carlisle

Arms of Thomas Howard, 1st Earl of Berkshire

Arms of Charles Howard, 2nd Earl of Berkshire

Arms of William Howard, 1st Viscount Stafford

Coat of arms Howard Earl of Nottingham Effingham (original)

=== Arms of the Duke of Norfolk ===
Coat of arms of the Duke of Norfolk
Adopted 1842 by the future 14th Duke of Norfolk, who added the prefix "FitzAlan" to his surname and replaced the 4th quarter "Mowbray" with "FitzAlan". Coronet A Coronet of a Duke Crest 1st: Issuant from a Ducal Coronet Or a pair of Wings Gules each charged with a Bend between six Cross-crosslets fitchy Argent (Howard); 2nd: On a Chapeau Gules turned up Ermine a Lion statant gardant with tail extended Or gorged with a Ducal Coronet Argent (Thomas of Brotherton); 3rd: On a Mount Vert a Horse passant Argent holding in the mouth a Slip of Oak Vert fructed proper (Fitzalan). Escutcheon Quarterly, 1st: Gules on a Bend between six Cross-crosslets fitchy Argent an Escutcheon Or charged with a Demi-lion rampant pierced through the mouth by an arrow within a Double Tressure flory counterflory of the first (Howard); 2nd: Gules three Lions passant gardant in pale Or, Armed and Langued Azure, in chief a Label of three points Argent (Plantagenet of Norfolk); 3rd: Checky Or and Azure (Warenne); 4th: Gules a Lion rampant Or, Armed and Langued Azure (Fitzalan). Supporters Dexter a Lion, sinister a Horse both Argent the latter holding in the mouth a Slip of Oak Vert fructed proper. Motto Sola Virtus Invicta (Latin for "Virtue alone is unconquered"). Other elements Placed behind the shield are two gold batons in saltire enamelled at the ends in black, which represent the Duke of Norfolk's office as Earl Marshal and Hereditary Marshal of England. Symbolism The shield on the bend in the first quarter of the arms was granted as an augmentation of honour by Henry VIII to the 2nd Duke of Norfolk, to commemorate his victory at the Battle of Flodden. It is a modification of the Royal coat of arms of Scotland. Instead of its normal rampant position, the lion is shown cut in half with an arrow through its mouth, commemorating the death of King James IV at the battle.

== Titles ==
Title	Grantee	Created	Extinct	Notes
(England) Duke of Norfolk		28 June 1483		Premier duke of England
(England) Earl of Arundel				Premier earl of England; subsidiary to the Duke of Norfolk since 1660
(England) Earl of Surrey				Subsidiary to the Duke of Norfolk since 1660
(England) Baron Howard of Effingham	Lord William Howard	1554		
(England) Earl of Nottingham (1596 creation)	Charles Howard, 2nd Baron Howard of Effingham	1596	1681	
(England) Baron Howard de Walden	Admiral Lord Thomas Howard	1597		Created by writ of summons. Has passed through many families.
(England) Earl of Suffolk (1603 creation)	Admiral Lord Thomas Howard	1603		
(England) Earl of Berkshire (1626 creation)	Lord Thomas Howard	1626		
(England) Baron Howard of Escrick	Edward Howard	12 April 1628	29 April 1715	
(England) Baron Stafford (1640 creation)	Lord William Howard	1640		
(England) Viscount Stafford	Lord William Howard	1640	1762	
(England) Earl of Stafford	Mary Howard, 1st Baroness Stafford	1688	1762	
(England) Earl of Norfolk (1644 creation)	Thomas Howard, 14th/21st Earl of Arundel	1644		
(England) Earl of Carlisle (1661 creation)	Charles Howard	20 April 1661		1st Earl also created Viscount Howard by Oliver Cromwell, which passed into oblivion upon the Restoration.
(England) Baron Howard of Castle Rising	Henry Howard, 6th Duke of Norfolk	1669	20 September 1777	
(England) Earl of Norwich (1672 creation)	Henry Howard, 6th Duke of Norfolk	1672	20 September 1777	
(Kingdom of Great Britain) Earl of Bindon	Henry Howard, 6th Earl of Suffolk	30 January 1706	8 February 1722	Held with the Earl of Suffolk from 1709 to 1722
(Kingdom of Great Britain) Earl of Effingham (1731 creation)	Francis Howard, 7th Baron Howard of Effingham	8 December 1731	11 December 1816	
(United Kingdom) Earl of Effingham (1837 creation)	General Kenneth Alexander Howard, 11th Baron Howard of Effingham	27 January 1837		
(United Kingdom) Baron Howard of Glossop	Lord Edward George Fitzalan Howard	26 November 1869		Subsidiary to Dukedom of Norfolk since 1975.
(United Kingdom) Baron Lanerton	Admiral The Honourable Edward Granville George Howard	1 January 1874	8 October 1880	
(United Kingdom) Viscount FitzAlan of Derwent	Lord Edmund Bernard Talbot née FitzAlan-Howard	28 April 1921	17 May 1962	
(United Kingdom) Baron Howard of Penrith	Esmé William Howard	10 July 1930		
(United Kingdom) Baron Howard of Henderskelfe	Major George Anthony Geoffrey Howard, JP	1 July 1983	27 November 1984	Life Peerage
(United Kingdom) Baron Howard of Rising	Greville Howard, Baron Howard of Rising	4 June 2004		Life Peerage

== Earl Marshal ==
Earl Marshal is a hereditary royal office and chivalric title under the sovereign of the United Kingdom used in England (then, following the Act of Union 1800, in the United Kingdom). It is the eighth of the Great Officers of State in the United Kingdom, ranking beneath the Lord High Constable and above the Lord High Admiral.

The Earl Marshal has responsibility for the organisation of State funerals and the monarch's coronation in Westminster Abbey. He is also a leading officer of arms. The office is hereditary in the Howard family in their position as Dukes of Norfolk, the senior dukedom in the United Kingdom.

== Howard family tree ==
Family tree of the Dukes of Norfolk and Suke of Surrey; Earls of Arundel, East Anglia, Norfolk, Norwich, Nottingham, and Surrey; and Barons Mowbray, Segrave and Stourton

Earl of East Anglia (Earls of Norfolk and Suffolk) (1st creation), a. 1069
Ralph the Staller c. 1011–1068; 1st Earl of Norfolk and Suffolk, or of the East Angles (Earl c. 1066/67 – 1068)
Earl of Surrey (1st creation), c. 1088
Ralph de Gael a. 1040–1100; 2nd Earl of Norfolk and Suffolk, or of the East Angles (Earl 1068–1074)	Roger Bigod (Bigot) d. 1107; Sheriff of Norfolk and Suffolk	William de Warenne c. 1035–1088; 1st Earl (of) Warenne / Earl of Surrey, Lord of Lewes, Seigneur de Varennes
Earldom forfeit, 1074
Earl of Norfolk (2nd creation), 1141
King Henry I c. 1068–1135	Maud Bigod	William Bigod d. 1120	Hugh Bigod; 1095–1177; 1st Earl of Norfolk (Earl 1141–1177)	William de Warenne d. 1138; 2nd Earl (of) Warenne / Earl of Surrey
Earl of Arundel, Earl of Sussex (1st creations), c. 1138
Empress Matilda c. 1102–1167	Geoffrey Plantagenet; 1113–1251; Count of Anjou	Adeliza of Louvain c. 1103–1151	William d'Aubigny c. 1109–1176; 1st Earl of Arundel (Sussex), Earl of Lincoln	William de Warenne; 1119–1148; 3rd Earl of Surrey
King Henry II; 1133–1189	William d'Aubigny b. c. 1138/1150–1176; 2nd Earl of Arundel (Sussex)	Roger Bigod c. 1144/1150–1221; 2nd Earl of Norfolk (Earl 1189–1221, disputed 1177–1189)	William of Blois c. 1137–1159	Isabel de Warenne c. 1130 – 1203; 4th Countess of Surrey suo jure	Hamelin de Warenne c. 1130–1202; Comte de Warenne / Earl of Surrey, jure uxoris
King John; 1166/1167–1216	William d'Aubigny a. 1180–1221; 3rd Earl of Arundel (Sussex)	Hugh Bigod; 1186–1225; 3rd Earl of Norfolk (Earl 1221–1225)	Maud Marshal; 1192–1248	William de Warenne c. 1160s/1170s–1240 5th Earl of Surrey
William d'Aubigny c. 1203–a. 1124; 4th Earl of Arundel (Sussex)	Hugh d'Aubigny d. 1243; 5th Earl of Arundel (Sussex)	Isabel d'Aubigny	John Fitzalan; 1200–1240; Lord of Clun and Oswestry	Roger Bigod c. 1209–1270; 4th Earl of Norfolk (Earl 1233–1270)	Hugh Bigod c. 1211–1266
Earl of Sussex (1st creation), 1282
King Henry III; 1207–1272	John Fitzalan; 1223–1267; 6th Earl of Arundel (Sussex), jure matris	John de Warenne; 1231–1304; 1st Earl of Sussex (Earl of Sussex 1282–1304), 6th Earl of Surrey (Earl of Surrey 1240–1304)
Baron Segrave of Se(a)grave, 1283
Nicholas Segrave c. 1238–a. 1295; 1st Baron Segrave	King Edward I 1239–1307	Edmund Crouchback; 1245–1296; Earl of Lancaster	John Fitzalan; 1246–1272; 7th Earl of Arundel (Sussex), jure matris	Roger Bigod c. 1245–1306; 5th Earl of Norfolk (Earl 1270–1306)
Earldom extinct, 1270
Baron Mowbray, 1283	Earl of Arundel (2nd (1st by writ) creation), 1289
John Segrave c. 1256–1325; 2nd Baron Segrave	Roger de Mowbray; 1254–1297; 1st Baron Mowbray	Richard Fitzalan; 1267–1302; 1st (or 6th) Earl of Arundel	William de Warenne; 1256–1286
Earl of Norfolk (3rd creation), 1312
Stephen Segrave d. 1325; 3rd Baron Segrave	Thomas of Brotherton; 1300–1338; 1st Earl of Norfolk (Earl 1312–1338)	John Mowbray; 1286–1322; 2nd Baron Mowbray	Henry c. 1281–1345; Earl of Leicester, Earl of Lancaster	Edmund Fitzalan; 1286–1326; 2nd (or 7th) Earl of Arundel	Alice de Warenne; 1287–1388 heir apparent to the Earldom of Surrey	John de Warenne; 1286–1347; 7th Earl of Surrey, 2nd Earl of Sussex
Earldom of Arundel (2nd creation) forfeit, 1326	Earldom of Sussex extinct(?), 1347
Earldom of Arundel (2nd creation) restored, 1331
John Segrave; 1315–1353; 4th Baron Segrave	Margaret of Brotherton; 1320–1399; Duchess of Norfolk "for life" (Duchess 1397–1399), 2nd Countess of Norfolk (Countess 1338–1399),	John Mowbray; 1310–1361; 3rd Baron Mowbray	Joan of Lancaster c. 1312–1349	Eleanor of Lancaster; 1318–1372	Richard FitzAlan c. 1313–1376; 3rd (or 8th) Earl of Arundel (Earl of Arundel 1331–1376), 8th Earl of Surrey (Earl of Surrey 1347–1376)
Baron Arundel, 1377
Elizabeth de Segrave; 1338–1368; 5th Baroness Segrave	John de Mowbray; 1340–1368; 4th Baron Mowbray	Richard FitzAlan; 1346–1397; 4th (or 9th) Earl of Arundel, 9th Earl of Surrey	John FitzAlan c. 1348–1379; 1st Baron Arundel	Alice FitzAlan
Earldom of Arundel (2nd creation) forfeit, 1397
Earl of Nottingham (1st creation), 1377	Earl of Nottingham (2nd creation), 1383; Duke of Norfolk (1st creation), 1397	Duke of Surrey, 1397
John de Mowbray; 1365–1383; Earl of Nottingham (Earl 1377–1383), 6th Baron Segrave, 5th Baron Mowbray (Baron 1368–1383)	Thomas de Mowbray; 1366–1399; 1st Duke of Norfolk, etc. (Duke 1397–1399), 3rd Earl of Norfolk (Earl 1399), 7th Baron Segrave, 6th Baron Mowbray (Baron 1377–1399)	Elizabeth Fitzalan; 1366–1425	John FitzAlan; 1364–1390; 2nd Baron Arundel	Thomas Holland; 1372–1400; Duke of Surrey, Earl of Kent, Baron Holland
Earldom of Nottingham extinct, 1383	Titles forfeit, 1399	Dukedom of Surrey renounced, 1400
Baron Stourton, 1448	Duke of Norfolk (1st creation restored), 1425	Earldom of Arundel (2nd creation) restored, 1400
John Stourton; 1400–1462; 1st Baron Stourton (Baron 1448–1462)	Thomas de Mowbray; 1385–1405; 4th Earl of Norfolk, 8th Baron Segrave, 7th Baron Mowbray (Earl 1399–1405)	John de Mowbray; 1392–1432; 2nd Duke of Norfolk (Duke 1425–1432), 5th Earl of Norfolk, 9th Baron Segrave, 8th Baron Mowbray (Earl 1405–1432)	Margaret de Mowbray c. 1388–1459	Robert Howard; 1385–1436	Isabel de Mowbray c. 1400–1452	Thomas FitzAlan; 1381–1415; 5th (or 10th) Earl of Arundel, 10th Earl of Surrey	John Fitzalan; 1385–1421; 6th (or 11th) Earl of Arundel, 3rd Baron Arundel, 3rd Baron Maltravers
Duke of Norfolk (4th creation), 1483
William Stourton a. 1426–1478; 2nd Baron Stourton (Baron 1462–1478)	John de Mowbray; 1415–1461; 3rd Duke of Norfolk, 6th Earl of Norfolk, 10th Baron Segrave, 9th Baron Mowbray (Duke 1432–1461)	John Howard; 1425–1485; 1st Duke of Norfolk, 13th Baron Segrave, 12th Baron Mowbray (Duke 1483–1485)	John Fitzalan; 1408–1435; 7th (or 12th) Earl of Arundel, 4th Baron Arundel, 4th Baron Maltravers	William Fitzalan; 1417–1487; 9th (or 14th) Earl of Arundel, 6th Baron Arundel, 6th Baron Maltravers
Titles forfeit, 1485
Earl of Surrey (2nd creation), 1451	Duke of Norfolk (4th creation) restored and Earl of Surrey, 1514
John Stourton c. 1454–1485; 3rd Baron Stourton (Baron 1479–1485)	William Stourton c. 1457–1524; 5th Baron Stourton (Baron 1487–1524)	John de Mowbray; 1444–1476; 4th Duke of Norfolk, 7th Earl of Norfolk, 11th Baron Segrave, 10th Baron Mowbray (Duke 1461–1476), Earl of Surrey (Earl 1451–1476)	King Edward IV; 1442–1483	Thomas Howard; 1443–1524; 2nd Duke of Norfolk, 1st Earl of Surrey (Duke 1514–1524)	Humfrey Fitzalan; 1429–1438; 8th (or 13th) Earl of Arundel, 5th Baron Arundel, 5th Baron Maltravers	Thomas Fitzalan; 1450–1524; 10th (or 15th) Earl of Arundel, 7th Baron Arundel, 7th Baron Maltravers
Dukedom of Norfolk, Earldom of Nottingham, Earldom of Surrey extinct, 1476
Duke of Norfolk (3rd creation), Earl of Nottingham (3rd creation), and Earl of Surrey, 1477
Francis Stourton; 1485–1487; 4th Baron Stourton (Baron 1485–1487)	Edward Stourton; 1463–1535; 6th Baron Stourton (Baron 1524–1535)	Anne de Mowbray; 1472–1481; 8th Countess of Norfolk, 12th Baroness Segrave, 11th Baroness Mowbray (Countess 1476–1481)	Richard of Shrewsbury; 1473–1483; Duke of York, Duke of Norfolk, Earl of Nottingham, Earl of Warenne (Duke 1477–1483)	Anne of York; 1475–1511	Thomas Howard; 1473–1554; 3rd Duke of Norfolk, 2nd Earl of Surrey (Duke 1524–1554)	Edmund Howard c. 1478–1539	Elizabeth Boleyn c. 1480–1538	William Fitzalan; 1476–1544; 11th (or 16th) Earl of Arundel, 8th Baron Arundel, 8th Baron Maltravers
Earldom of Norfolk extinct and Baronies Segrave and Mowbray in abeyance, 1481	Dukedom of Norfolk, Earldom of Nottingham, Earldom of Surrey extinct, 1483	Attainted, 1547; Restored, 1553
William Stourton c. 1505–1548; 7th Baron Stourton	Earl of Nottingham (5th creation), 1525	King Henry VIII; 1491–1547	Anne Boleyn c. 1501 or 1507–1536
Viscount Howard of Bindon, 1559
Charles Stourton c. 1520–1557; 8th Baron Stourton	Henry Howard; 1517–1547 styled Earl of Surrey	Thomas Howard c. 1520–1582; 1st Viscount Howard of Bindon	Mary FitzRoy; 1519–1557	Henry FitzRoy; 1519–1536; Duke of Richmond and Somerset, Earl of Nottingham	Catherine Howard c. 1524–1542	Henry Fitzalan; 1512–1580; 12th (or 17th) Earl of Arundel, 9th Baron Arundel, 9th Baron Maltravers
Earldom of Nottingham extinct, 1536
Thomas Howard; 1536–1572; 4th Duke of Norfolk, 3rd Earl of Surrey, 13th Baron Mowbray (Duke 1554–1572)	Henry Howard; 1540–1614; Earl of Northampton	Queen Elizabeth I 1533–1603	Mary FitzAlan; 1540–1557
Dukedom (3rd creation) forfeit, 1572
Earl of Arundel (3rd creation), 1580	Earl of Suffolk (4th creation), 1603
John Stourton; 1553–1588; 9th Baron Stourton	Edward Stourton c. 1555–1633; 10th Baron Stourton	Philip Howard; 1557–1595; 20th/13th/1st Earl of Arundel, styled Earl of Surrey	Thomas Howard; 1561–1626; Earl of Suffolk	Lord William Howard; 1563–1640
Earldom of Arundel and Barony of Mowbray attainted, 1589	see Earls, Marquesses, and Dukes of Suffolk family tree
Earl of Arundel (3rd creation) and Barony of Mowbray restored, 1604; Earl of Norfolk (5th creation), 1644
William Stourton c. 1594–1672; 11th Baron Stourton	Thomas Howard; 1585–1646; 21st/14th/2nd Earl of Arundel, 2nd/4th Earl of Surrey, 1st Earl of Norfolk, 14th Baron Mowbray (Earl 1644–1646)	Philip
see Earls of Shrewsbury family tree
Edward Stourton; 1617–1644	Alethea Talbot; 1585–1654; 17th Baroness Strange of Blackmere, 14th Baroness Talbot, 13th Baroness Furnivall	Henry Frederick Howard; 1608–1652; 22nd/15th/3rd Earl of Arundel, 3rd/5th Earl of Surrey, 2nd Earl of Norfolk, 15th Baron Mowbray (Earl 1646–1652)	William Howard; 1614–1680; Viscount Stafford	William
Duke of Norfolk (4th creation restored), 1660	Baron Howard of Castle Rising, 1669; Earl of Norwich (3rd creation), 1672
William Stourton d. 1685; 12th Baron Stourton	Thomas Howard; 1627–1677; 5th Duke of Norfolk, 21st/14th/2nd Earl of Arundel, 4th/6th Earl of Surrey, 16th Baron Mowbray (Duke 1660–1677) 18th Baron Strange of Blackmere, 15th Baron Talbot, 14th Baron Furnivall (Baron 1654–1677)	Henry Howard; 1628–1684; 6th Duke of Norfolk, 22nd/15th/3rd Earl of Arundel, 5th/7th Earl of Surrey; 18th Baron Strange of Blackmere, 17th Baron Mowbray, 15th Baron Talbot, 14th Baron Furnivall (Duke 1677–1684) 1st Earl of Norwich, etc. (Earl 1672–1684)	Charles Howard; 1630–1713	Col. Bernard Howard; 1641–1717	Charles Howard; 1628–1685; Earl of Carlisle
Edward Stourton; 1665–1720; 13th Baron Stourton	Thomas Stourton; 1667–1744; 14th Baron Stourton	Charles Stourton; 1669–1739	Henry Howard; 1655–1701; 7th Duke of Norfolk, 22nd/15th/3rd Earl of Arundel, 5th/7th Earl of Surrey, 2nd Earl of Norwich, etc. 18th Baron Mowbray, 19th Baron Strange of Blackmere, 15th Baron Talbot, 14th Baron Furnivall (Duke 1684–1701)	Lord Thomas Howard; 1662–1689	Henry Charles Howard d. 1720
Thomas Howard; 1683–1732; 8th Duke of Norfolk, 23rd/16th/4th Earl of Arundel, 6th/8th Earl of Surrey, 3rd Earl of Norwich, etc. 18th Baron Strange of Blackmere, 15th Baron Talbot, 14th Baron Furnivall, 19th Baron Mowbray (Duke 1701–1732)	Edward Howard; 1685–1777; 9th Duke of Norfolk, 24th/17th/5th Earl of Arundel, 7th/9th Earl of Surrey, 4th Earl of Norwich, etc. 20th Baron Mowbray, 20th Baron Strange of Blackmere, 15th Baron Talbot, 14th Baron Furnivall (Duke 1732–1777)	Philip Howard; 1688–1750	Bernard Howard; 1674–1735
Earldom of Norwich (3rd creation) and Barony of Howard of Castle Rising extinct and Baronies of Furnivall, Mowbray, Segrave, Strange of Blackmere, and Talbot abeyant, 1777
Charles Stourton; 1702–1753; 15th Baron Stourton	William Stourton; 1704–1781; 16th Baron Stourton	Winifred Howard; 1726–1753	Anne Howard; 1742–1787	Charles Howard; 1720–1786; 10th Duke of Norfolk, 25th/18th/6th Earl of Arundel, 8th/10th Earl of Surrey (Duke 1777–1786)	Henry Howard; 1713–1787
Charles Philip Stourton; 1752–1816; 17th Baron Stourton	Charles Howard; 1746–1815; 11th Duke of Norfolk, 26th/19th/7th Earl of Arundel, 9th/11th Earl of Surrey (Duke 1786–1815)
William Stourton; 1776–1846; 18th Baron Stourton	Bernard Howard; 1765–1842; 12th Duke of Norfolk, 27th/20th/8th Earl of Arundel, 10th/12th Earl of Surrey (Duke 1815–1842)	Henry Howard-Molyneux-Howard; 1766–1824
Charles Stourton; 1802–1872; 19th Baron Stourton	Henry Howard; 1791–1856; 13th Duke of Norfolk, 28th/21st/9th Earl of Arundel, 11th/13th Earl of Surrey (Duke 1842–1856)	Henry Howard-Molyneux-Howard; 1802–1875
Baron Mowbray and Baron Segrave abeayance restored, 1878	Baron Howard of Glossop, 1869
Alfred Joseph Stourton; 1829–1893; 24th Baron Segrave, 21st/23rd Baron Mowbray, 20th Baron Stourton	Henry Granville Fitzalan-Howard; 1815–1860; 14th Duke of Norfolk, 29th/22nd/10th Earl of Arundel, 12th/14th Earl of Surrey (Duke 1856–1860)	Edward George Fitzalan-Howard; 1818–1883; 1st Baron Howard of Glossop
Baron Howard of Penrith, 1830
Charles Botolph Joseph Stourton; 1867–1936; 25th Baron Segrave, 22nd/24th Baron Mowbray, 21st Baron Stourton	Henry Fitzalan-Howard; 1847–1917; 15th Duke of Norfolk, 30th/23rd/11th Earl of Arundel, 13th/15th Earl of Surrey, Lord Maltravers, Earl of Arundel and Surrey (Duke 1860–1917)	Francis Fitzalan-Howard; 1859–1924; 2nd Baron Howard of Glossop	Esmé Howard; 1863–1939; 1st Baron Howard of Penrith
William Marmaduke Stourton; 1895–1965; 26th Baron Segrave, 23rd/25th Baron Mowbray, 22nd Baron Stourton	Bernard Fitzalan-Howard; 1908–1975; 16th Duke of Norfolk, 31st/24th/12th Earl of Arundel, 14th/16th Earl of Surrey (Duke 1917–1975)	Bernard Edward Fitzalan-Howard; 1885–1972; 3rd Baron Howard of Glossop	Francis Howard; 1905–1999; 2nd Baron Howard of Penrith
Charles Edward Stourton; 1923–2006; 27th Baron Segrave, 24th/26th Baron Mowbray, 23rd Baron Stourton	Miles Fitzalan-Howard; 1915–2002; 17th Duke of Norfolk, 32nd/25th/13th Earl of Arundel, 15th/17th Earl of Surrey, 4th Baron Howard of Glossop (Duke 1975–2002) m. Mary Teresa Constable-Maxwell
Edward William Stephen Stourton; 1953–2021; 28th Baron Segrave, 25th/27th Baron Mowbray, 24th Baron Stourton	Marsha Howard b. 1953	Edward Fitzalan-Howard b. 1956; 18th Duke of Norfolk, 33rd/26th/14th Earl of Arundel, 16th/18th Earl of Surrey, 5th Baron Howard of Glossop (from 2002) m. Georgina Susan Gore	Philip Esmé Howard b. 1945; 3rd Baron Howard of Penrith
Sarah Louise Stourton b. 1982	Isabella Laura Stourton b. 1983	Camilla Charlotte Stourton b. 1987	Francesca Jane Stourton b. 1988	James Charles Peter Stourton b. 1991; 29th Baron Segrave, 26th/28th Baron Mowbray, 25th Baron Stourton	Henry Fitzalan-Howard b. 1987 styled Earl of Arundel and Surrey	Thomas Philip Howard b. 1974
Co-heir presumptive to the Baronies Segrave, Mowbray, and Stourton	Co-heir presumptive to the Baronies Segrave, Mowbray, and Stourton	Co-heir presumptive to the Baronies Segrave, Mowbray, and Stourton	Co-heir presumptive to the Baronies Segrave, Mowbray, and Stourton	Heir apparent to the dukedom	Heir apparent to the Barony Howard of Penrith

== Bibliography ==
- William Dugdale, Baronage of England (London, 1675–76);
- Collins, Peerage of England (fifth edition, London, 1779);
- Henry Howard, Memorials of the Howard Family (privately printed, 1834);
- Edmund Lodge, Portraits of Illustrious Personages (London, 1835); The Howard Papers, with a Biographical Pedigree and Criticism by Canston (London, 1862);
- Yeatman, The Early Genealogical History of the House of Arundel (London, 1882);
- Doyle, Official Baronage of England (London, 1886);
- Brenan and Statham, The House of Howard (London, 1907).
