= John Howard (died 1437) =

Medieval English landholder

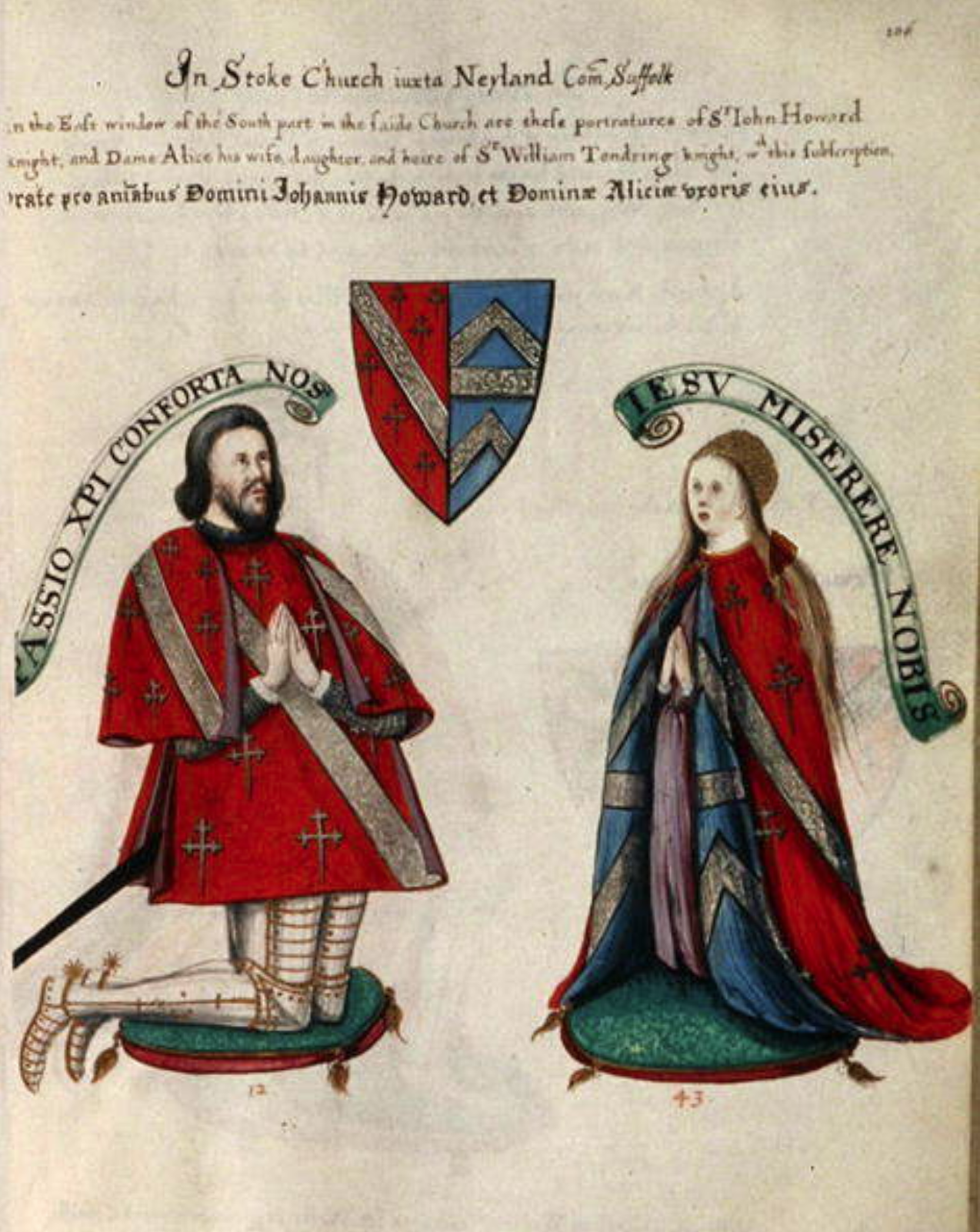
Sir John Howard (died 1437) with his second wife Alice Tendring. 1637 drawing by Henry Lilly, Rouge Dragon Pursuivant, of stained glass depiction in Stoke-by-Nayland Church in Suffolk. Displaying arms of Howard impaling Tendring

Arms of Sir John Howard (died 1437): Gules, a bend between six cross-crosslets fitchy argent. After the Battle of Flodden in 1513 his descendant the 2nd Duke of Norfolk was granted an augmentation of honour to these arms by King Henry VIII

Sir John Howard (c. 1366–1437), of Wiggenhall and East Winch, in Norfolk, England, was a landowner, soldier, courtier, administrator and politician. His grandson was John Howard, 1st Duke of Norfolk, the great-grandfather of two queens, Anne Boleyn and Catherine Howard, two of the six wives of King Henry VIII.

== Origins ==
Born in about 1366, Howard was the son and heir of Robert Howard and Margaret Scales, daughter of Robert de Scales, Baron Scales and Katherine d'Ufford, a daughter and eventual heiress of Robert d'Ufford, Earl of Suffolk. His grandfather, John Howard (died 1364), had served as Admiral of the Northern Fleet from 1335 to 1337.

== Career ==
By 1380 Howard was married to an heiress and had been knighted by March 1387, when he served at sea in the fleet commanded by Richard FitzAlan, Earl of Arundel that fought the French and their allies at the Battle of Margate. In 1389, both his father and his father-in-law died, bringing him most of the paternal lands and those inherited by his wife, which he retained for life when she died in 1391. These estates gave him not only a considerable income but also local influence.

In 1394, Howard was appointed a member of the royal household, serving in the English expedition that year against Ireland. In 1397, by which time he had married another heiress, he was made a justice of the peace (JP) for both Suffolk and Essex and in September was elected a Member (MP) of the Parliament of England for Essex. This Parliament was used by King Richard II to penalise his opponents and, on behalf of the Crown, Howard was empowered to seize the estates of rebel nobles and to collect large fines from the dissident counties of Essex and Hertfordshire. He then accompanied the King on his second expedition to Ireland in 1399.

Howard's position in the royal household was not renewed under the new reign of King Henry IV, but he continued to sit as a JP and serve on royal commissions. He served the first of two terms as High Sheriff of Essex and Hertfordshire in 1400, during which he was summoned to the Great Council of August 1401, and was High Sheriff of Cambridgeshire and Huntingdonshire in both 1401 and 1402. In 1407 he returned to Parliament as MP for Cambridgeshire.

In 1408, Howard's wife's father died, and she inherited his lands. Chosen again as Sheriff of Essex and Hertfordshire in 1414, he was involved in preparations for the first expedition to France of the new King, Henry V. In 1420 he was in a feud in Suffolk with the influential MP Thomas Kerdiston, which Thomas Erpingham reported to the Privy Council, but by 1422 was sufficiently in favour locally to be elected Suffolk's MP.

After sitting in this third Parliament, and following the death of his second wife in 1426, Howard took less part in local administration, though continuing as a JP and on royal commissions. In February 1436, he was asked to contribute 100 marks to the cost of the Duke of York's expedition to France.

Howard then went on pilgrimage to the Holy Land, where he died in Jerusalem on 17 November 1437. His remains were brought back to England and buried beside his second wife at Stoke-by-Nayland.

== Marriages and issue ==
Howard married twice:

- Firstly, in about 1380, to Margaret de Plaiz, the daughter and heiress of John de Plaiz, 5th Baron Plaiz (1342/3–1389). By his first wife he had one son and heir:

- John Howard, who predeceased his father

Arms of Tendring (de Tendring) of Tendring Hall in the parish of Stoke-by-Nayland in Suffolk: Azure, a fess between two chevrons argent

- Secondly, before June 1397, he married Alice Tendring (d. 18 October 1426, buried Stoke-by-Nayland), the only daughter and heiress of William Tendring. By his second wife he had two sons:

- Robert Howard (died 1436), who also predeceased his father.
- Henry Howard (died 1446), who married Mary Hussy, the daughter of Henry Hussey. Henry inherited the manors of Sprottisland, Burhous and Terrington from his mother. He was murdered in 1446.

== Landholdings and succession ==
Through both of Howard's parents and through his two wives, he acquired estates in several adjoining counties, among them:

- In Norfolk: Wiggenhall, Fersfield, East Winch, five manors near King's Lynn, Garboldisham, Toft, Weeting and Knapton.
- In Suffolk: Stoke-by-Nayland, Chelsworth, and Brook Hall near Dunwich.
- In Essex: Stansted Mountfichet, Oakley and Moze.
- In Cambridgeshire: Fowlmere.

After the death of Howard's eldest son in 1409, who left an only daughter, he settled many of these properties on this granddaughter, and when she married around 1425, he assured her husband John de Vere that many more would follow. His second son then died in 1436, leaving a grandson, John Howard, as the heir to be provided for. After Howard's death in 1437, bitter feuds over the inheritance broke out between the de Veres and the Howards, which continued into the Wars of the Roses, during which both John de Vere and John Howard lost their lives.
