= Great Howarth House =

Listed house in Greater Manchester, England

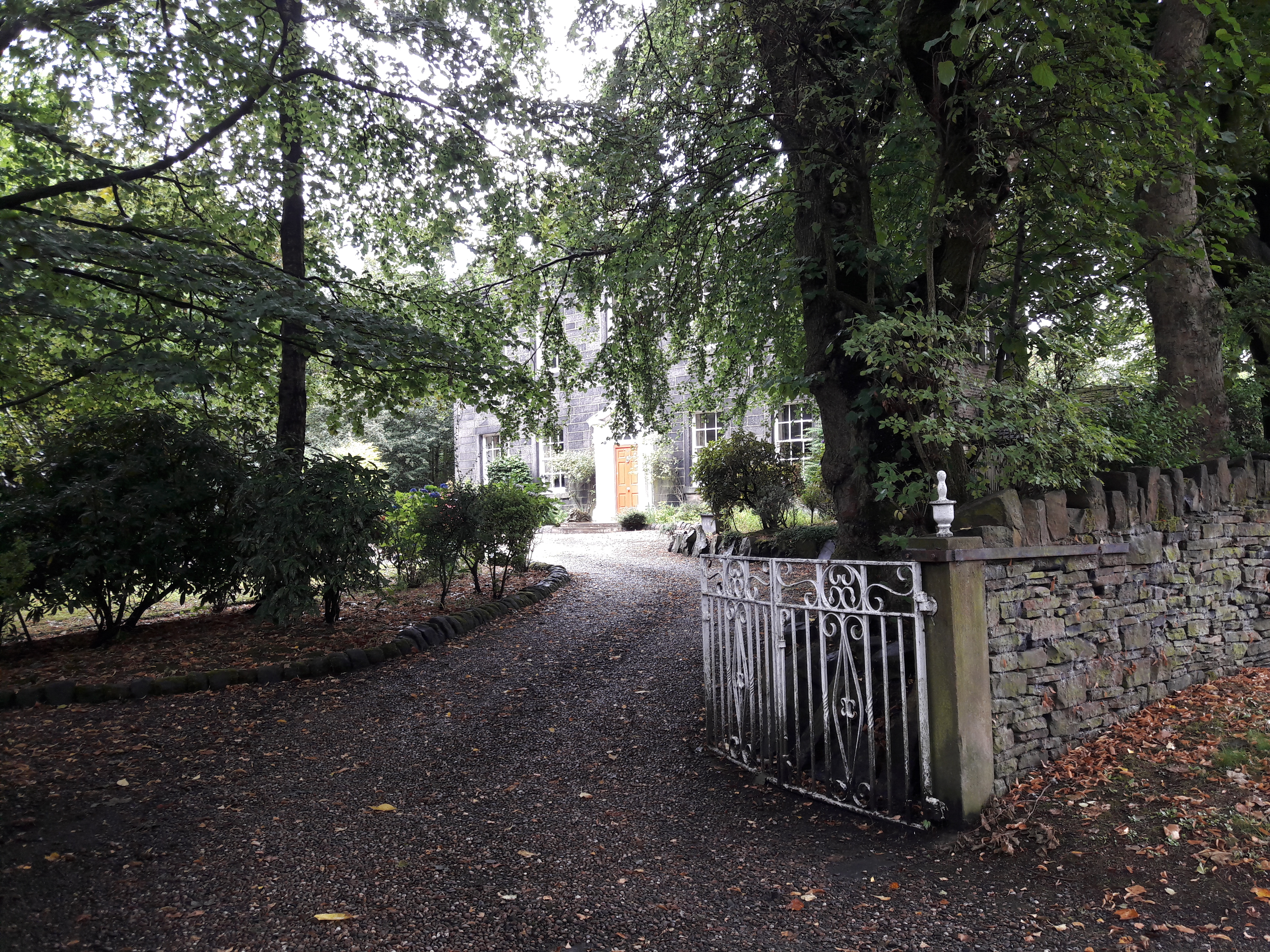
- Great Howarth House in 2018

- Location within Greater Manchester

General information
- Type: Private residence
- Location: Great Howarth, Wardle, Greater Manchester, England
- Coordinates: 53.6367°N 2.1359°W

Design and construction
- Designations

Listed Building – Grade II
- Official name: Great Howarth House
- Designated: 29 June 1966
- Reference no.: 1084239

Great Howarth House is a privately owned Grade II listed historic house located in Wardle, a village in the Metropolitan Borough of Rochdale, Greater Manchester, England.

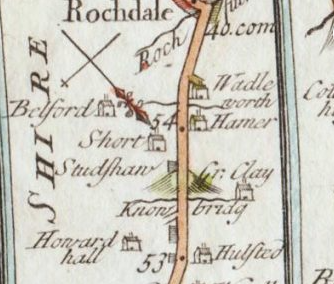
Howarth/Howard Hall as it appears on Ogilby's map of c. 1698

== History ==
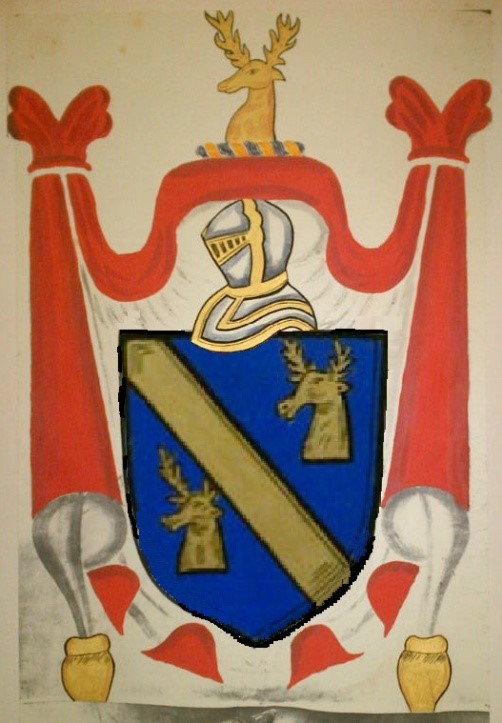
Howard/Howarth of Great Howarth Coat of Arms

Great Howarth House was the residence of the Howarths of Howarth from the 13th century until Radcliffe Howarth died unmarried in 1768. It was subsequently sold to John Entwistle and the house remains the residence of the Entwistle family. A pedigree scroll of the Howarth family compiled by Sir William Dugdale, states in a margin note that under the courtyard windows of the original house the Latin phrase 'Oremus pro bono Roberti Howarth statu fundatoris' ('Let us pray for the well-being of Robert Howarth, the founder') was carved. The Robert Howarth referred to died in 1611.

== Architecture ==
The Elizabethan manor house was demolished in the early 19th century. The current house dates largely from the early 19th century. It preserves nine original sash windows, and a tunnel vaulted cellar with stone mullioned window which probably dates from the earlier building of the 17th century.

== See also ==
- Listed buildings in Wardle, Greater Manchester
- Howorth, surname
