= Graham Howarth =

English entomologist

Thomas Graham Howarth, BEM (15 February 1916 – 8 April 2015) was an English entomologist of the National History Museum and member of the Royal Army Medical Corps who spent three years as a Japanese prisoner during the Second World War, first at Changi and then at Jinsen in Korea. He relieved the monotony by collecting insect specimens, in the course of which he discovered a new species. He took his collection of around 1500 specimens with him when he returned to Britain where it is known as The Graham Howarth PoW collection at the Natural History Museum and occupies 13 trays. In 1941, while still in England, he was a volunteer firefighter during the London Blitz and was awarded the British Empire Medal for saving the life of another firefighter. The butterfly genus Howarthia is named after him.
