= Haworth (surname) =

Haworth (/ˈhaʊ.ərθ/ HOW-ərth, US also /ˈheɪwərθ/ HAY-wərth, /ˈhoʊwərθ/ HOH-wərth or /hɑːrθ/ HARTH depending on the family) is a surname. Notable people with the surname include:

- Adrian Hardy Haworth (1767–1833), English entomologist, botanist, and carcinologist
- Alan Haworth, Baron Haworth (1948–2023), British politician
- Alan Haworth (ice hockey) (born 1960), Canadian retired ice hockey player
- Andy Haworth (born 1988), English footballer
- Sir Arthur Haworth, 1st Baronet (1865–1944), British businessman and Liberal politician
- Barbara Haworth-Attard (born 1953), Canadian children's book author
- Bobs Cogill Haworth (1900–1988), South African-born Canadian painter and potter
- Bryn Haworth (born c. 1948), British musician
- Carl Haworth (born 1989), Canadian soccer player
- Cheryl Haworth (born 1983), American Olympic weightlifter
- Erasmus Haworth (1855–1932), American geologist
- George Haworth (1864–1943), English footballer
- Gerrard Wendell Haworth (1911–2006), founder of furniture manufacturer Haworth
- Gordie Haworth (1932–2019), Canadian retired ice hockey player
- Ian Haworth (born 1947), British anti-cultist
- James Haworth (1896–1976), British Labour politician
- Janet Haworth (born c. 1950), Conservative Member of the National Assembly for Wales
- Jann Haworth (born 1942), American Pop artist
- Jill Haworth (1945–2011), English actress
- John Haworth (1876–1924), English football manager
- Julia Haworth (born 1979), English actress
- Kent Haworth (1946–2003), Canadian archivist
- Lara Haworth (born 1983), English writer and artist
- Lawrence Haworth (1926–2024), American-Canadian philosopher
- Leland John Haworth (1904–1979), American physicist and head of the Brookhaven National Laboratory, the Atomic Energy Commission and the National Science Foundation
- Paul Leland Haworth (1876–1936), American author, educator, explorer and politician
- Robert Haworth (disambiguation), various footballers
- Simon Haworth (born 1977), Welsh former international footballer
- Speedy Haworth (1922–2008), American country music guitarist and singer
- Ted Haworth (1917–1993), American Academy Award-winning production designer and art director
- Tony Haworth, Welsh bridge player; see Cheating in bridge#Tony Haworth, 1999
- Volga Haworth (c. 1898–1945), English/Irish-American dancer
- Walter Haworth (1883–1950) British chemist
- William Haworth (1905–1984), Australian politician
- Riley Haworth (born 2005), American EMT
