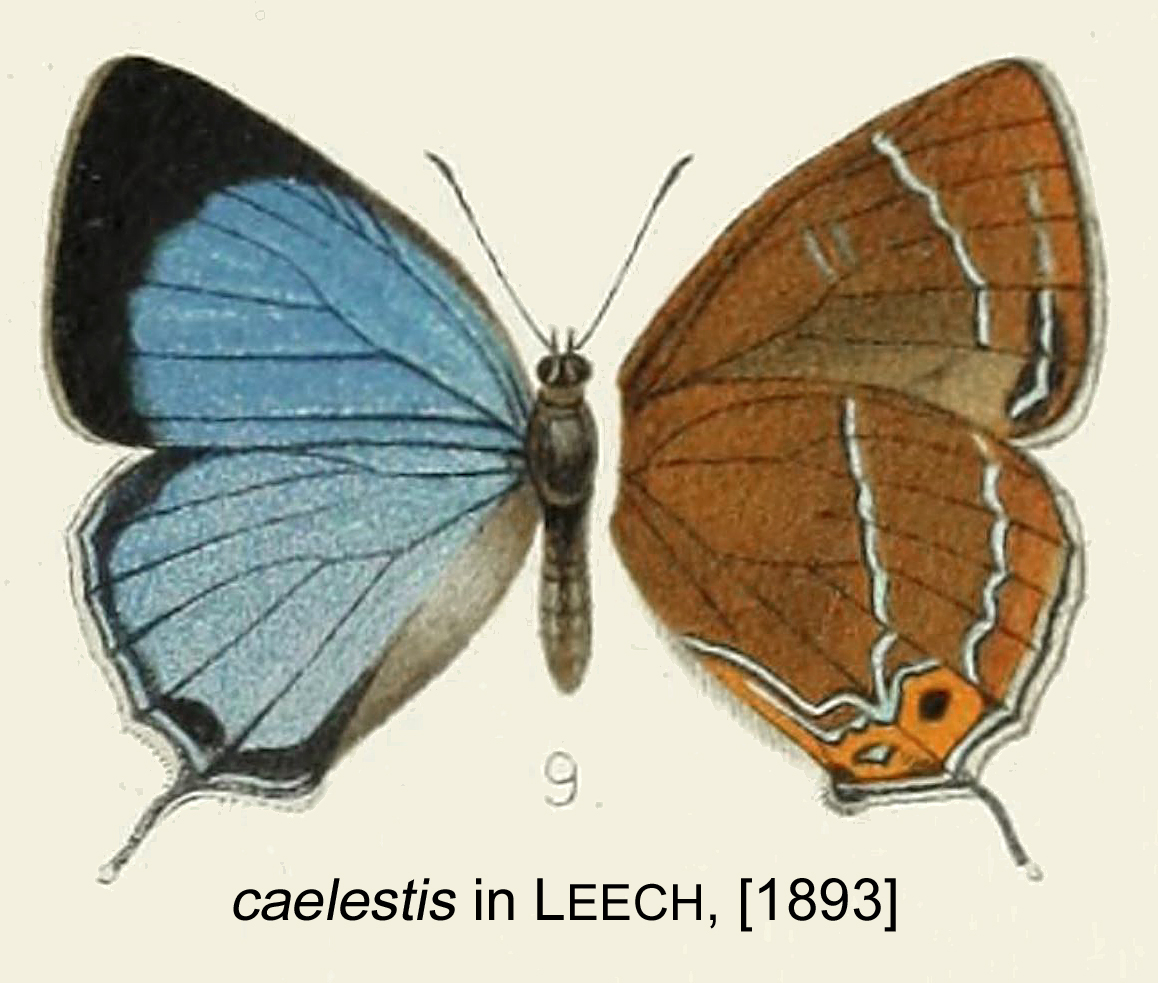

Scientific classification
- Kingdom: Animalia
- Phylum: Arthropoda
- Clade: Pancrustacea
- Class: Insecta
- Order: Lepidoptera
- Family: Lycaenidae
- Tribe: Theclini
- Genus: Howarthia; Shirôzu & Yamamoto, 1956

= Howarthia =

Butterfly genus in family Lycaenidae

Howarthia is a genus of butterflies in the family Lycaenidae ranging from China to Laos and Myanmar. It is named after British entomologist Graham Howarth.

== Species ==
- Howarthia caelestis (Leech, 1890) ) includes H. c. elegans Sugiyama, 1997 and H. c. derani Koiwaya, 2000 West China, Myanmar
- Howarthia cheni Chou & Wang, 1997 China, Guangdong, Ruyuan County.
- Howarthia courvoisieri (Oberthür, 1908) West China
- Howarthia hishikawai Koiwaya, 2000 China, Guizhou, Kaili, 1700 m.
- Howarthia kimurai Koiwaya, 2002 China, W Sichuan, Emei-shan
- Howarthia melli (Forster, 1940) China (Kwangtung)
- Howarthia nigricans (Leech, 1893) China, Ta-Chien-Lou.
- Howarthia sakakibarai Koiwaya, 2002 China, W Sichuan, Baoxing, 1500-2000 m.
- Howarthia sugiyamai Koiwaya, 2002= Hayashikeia sugiyamai China, Hunan, Wuling Shan.
- Howarthia ueharai Koiwaya, 2002 Laos
- Howarthia wakaharai Koiwaya, 2000 China, Sichuan Nanchuan, 2,000m.
- Howarthia watanabei Koiwaya, 1993 Hainan
- Howarthia yukinobui Koiwaya, 2002 Myanmar
