= Howarth =

- Pronunciation: /ˈhoʊwərθ/
- Language: English

Origin
- Language: English
- Origin: Great Howarth, Haworth
- Meaning: "settlement on a small hill"

Other names
- Variant forms: Hawrth, Hourth, Hearwarthe, Huarth, Howorth,

Howarth is a surname of Old English origin, most commonly found among families originating in the English counties of Yorkshire and Lancashire, especially around the village of Great Howarth near Rochdale, Lancashire, and Haworth in Yorkshire. It is found in a variety of different interrelated spellings, including Haworth and Howorth, and derives from one of two meanings, hoh-worth, meaning settlement on a small hill, and haga-worth, settlement surrounded by a hawthorn hedge. The first recorded use of the surname in its current spelling is from 1616; earlier varieties are found as far back as Robert de Hawrth in 1200. Other historical spellings of the name include Hearwarthe and Huarth.

There are appropriately 20,000 Howarths in the United Kingdom, centered on the historical location of Great Howarth in Rochdale.

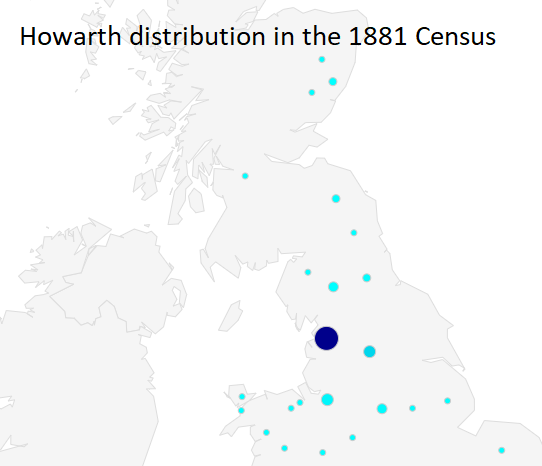
Howarth in the 1881 census

== Howarth of Great Howarth ==
The Howarths of Great Howarth were a landed family originally granted land in what became Great Howarth in Honorsfield, three miles north east of Rochdale in the 12th century. The Norroy Kings of Arms recorded their genealogies on their visitations of Lancashire in 1613 and 1664. The original Elizabethan Howarth Hall in Great Howarth was demolished in the early 19th century. The family of Howarth of Great Howarth were an important family in the Rochdale area from the 12th to the 18th century. Their estates were however dispersed in 1768 on the death of the last representative of the main line the Rev. Dr Radclyffe Howarth, D.C.L.

A pedigree of the family was set out in summary after the Visitation of Lancashire by Richard St. George, Norroy King of Arms, in 1613 and later in much more detail by Sir William Dugdale, Norroy King of Arms, in 1664/65, following his Lancashire Visitation of 1664. Dugdale detailed the Howarth family's descent from Osbert Howard de Haworth, a Keeper of the King's Buckhounds, in the 12th century until 1665, when Dugdale's friend, Dr Theophilus Howarth, was head of the Howarth family.

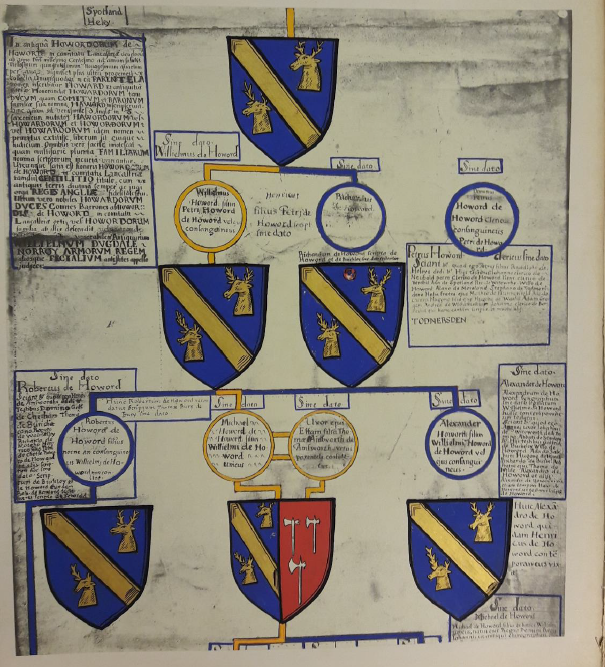
Pedigree scroll of Howarth of Howarth

== The Howard / Howarth of Great Howarth connection ==
Sir William Dugdale stated that Sir William Howard of Wiggenhall, progenitor of the powerful Howard family, was descended from Robert, a younger brother of Michael Howarth of Great Howarth. Sir William Howard, who lived in Norfolk during the 13th and early 14th centuries, became a judge and founded the line that later became Barons and Earls (several titles) and Dukes of Norfolk. The early references in the 13th century Charters to Peter Howarth as “Peter the clerk of Haword” may lend credence to this theory.

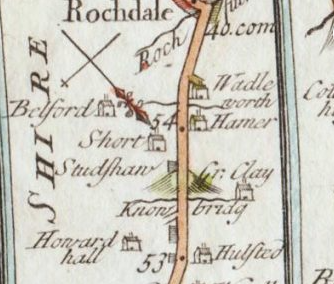
Howarth/Howard Hall near Rochdale as it appears on Ogilby's map of c.1698

== Howarth of Great Howarth Coat of Arms ==
Arms: Azure, a bend between two stags’ heads, couped, Crest on an Earl's helmet, a wreath Or and Azure, a Stag's head couped and horned Or. The Mantles dependent being gules, doubled, or lined Argent. Motto: Quod Ero Spero (What I hope to accomplish I shall accomplish)

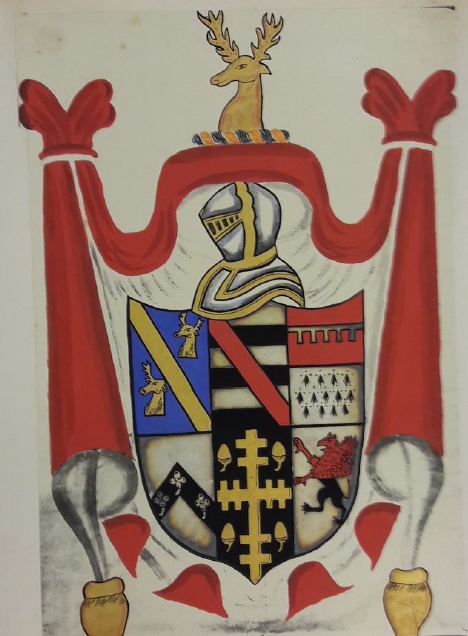
Howarth of Howarth coat of Arms in 1666

== People with the surname Howarth ==
=== In politics ===
- Alan Howarth, Baron Howarth of Newport (1944–2025), English politician
- David Howarth (born 1958), English academic and politician
- Sir George Howarth (born 1949), English politician
- Gerald Howarth (born 1947), English politician
- Harry Howarth (1916–1969), English politician
- Luke Howarth (born 1972), Australian federal politician
- Robert Howarth (1927–2021), English politician
- Valerie Howarth, Baroness Howarth of Breckland (1940–2025), English politician
- Walter Howarth (1882–1958), Australian politician

=== In sport ===
- Chris Howarth (born 1986), English association footballer
- Geoff Howarth (born 1951), New Zealand cricketer
- Hedley Howarth (1943–2008), New Zealand cricketer
- Jack Howarth (footballer), (born 1945), English association footballer
- Jerry Howarth (born 1946), American-Canadian sports broadcaster
- John Howarth (born 1945), English cricketer
- Russell Howarth (born 1982), English association footballer
- Shane Howarth (born 1968), New Zealand-Welsh rugby union player
- Stuart Howarth (born 1990), English rugby league player
- Thomas Howarth (1845–1897), English cricketer
- Charlie Howarth (born 1993), United States water polo player

=== In music ===
- Elgar Howarth (1935–2025), English composer and conductor
- Peter Howarth (born 1960), English musician
- Tod Howarth (born 1957), American musician

=== Other ===
- Brian Howarth, computer game programmer
- Charles Howarth (1814–1868), British co-operator
- Chloe Michelle Howarth (born 1996), Irish novelist
- David Howarth (author) (1912–1991), British naval historian and author
- Elijah Howarth (1853–1938), museologist and astronomer
- F. M. Howarth (1864–1908), American cartoonist
- Frank Howarth (born 1951), Australian public servant
- Henry Hoyle Howorth (1842–1923), British Conservative politician, barrister and amateur historian and geologist
- Jack Howarth (actor) (1896–1984), English television actor
- Jane Wilson-Howarth, British author, physician, lecturer and speaker.
- Matt Howarth, American comic book author
- Robert Guy Howarth (1906–1974), Australian scholar, literary critic and poet
- Robert W. Howarth, American biogeochemist
- Roger Howarth (born 1968), American television actor
- Stephen Howarth (born 1981), English artist and poet
- William Howarth (1940–2023), American

== See also ==
- Haworth
- Howorth
