= Henry Howorth =

Henry Howorth may refer to:

- Henry Howorth (barrister) (c.1746–1783), British King's Counsel and member of parliament for Abingdon
- Henry Howorth (New Zealand politician) (1834–1907), New Zealand solicitor and member of parliament
- Henry Hoyle Howorth (1842–1923), British barrister, member of parliament and historian
