= Trailbaston =

14th century English itinerant judicial commissions

Trailbaston (traillebastone, traillebastoun, traylebastoun) was a special type of itinerant judicial commission first created during the reign of Edward I of England and used many times thereafter during the reigns of Edward II and Edward III, primarily to punish felonies and trespass at the king's suit.

The first trailbaston commissions date back to 1305, when Edward I directed several teams of justices to visit each English county and seek presentments for felonies (homicide, theft, arson, and rape) and certain trespasses (premeditated assault, extortion, and violent disseisin). Edward I added conspiracy to the list of presentments in late 1305. In 1307 Edward I issued a revamped trailbaston commission that directed the justices to try assizes and deliver all prisoners in the counties they visited, not just those charged in previous trailbaston sessions. The 1307 trailbaston commission also directed justices to audit local compliance with the Statute of Winchester and to investigate local efforts to arrest felons.

The declared intention of the trailbaston commissions was to combat increasing levels of violence and public disorder, but an added bonus for the crown was the revenues brought by forfeiture, which was the punishment for conspiracy.

== See also ==
- John de Batesford
