= Robert Haworth =

Robert, Rob or Bob Haworth may refer to:

- Robert Haworth (footballer) (1879–?), footballer who played for Blackburn Rovers and Fulham in the 1900s
- Robert Haworth (politician) (1801–1875), New South Wales colonial politician
- Bob Haworth (1897–1962), footballer who played for Bolton Wanderers in three FA Cup Finals in the 1920s
- Rob Haworth (born 1975), footballer who played for Fulham in the 1990s
- Robert Downs Haworth (1898–1990), English chemist
