= Paul Leland Haworth =

American politician

Paul Leland Haworth (1876–1936) was an American author, educator, explorer and politician, born at West Newton, Indiana.

== Books ==
- The Hayes-Tilden Disputed Presidential Election of 1876 (1906)
- The Path of Glory (1911)
- America in Ferment (1915)
- George Washington, Farmer (1915) (reissued in 1925 as George Washington, Country Gentleman)
- The United States in Our Own Times, 1865–1920 (revised, 1924)
- Trail Makers of the Northwest (1921)
