= Hayworth =

Hayworth is a surname, and may refer to:

- Donald Hayworth (1898–1982), U.S. Representative from Michigan
- J. D. Hayworth Jr. (born 1958), American television host and former politician
- Nan Hayworth, U.S. Representative for New York
- Ray Hayworth (1904– 2002), American professional baseball player, manager and scout
- Rita Hayworth (1918–1987), an iconic American film actress and dancer
- Volga Hayworth (1897–1945), American dancer and vaudevillian
- Tyler Hayworth, college football player, 2012-2016 Wake Forest University Football

== See also ==
- Haworth (surname)
- Heyworth
