= Tony Howorth =

English cricketer

Tony Howorth (born 20 March 1938) is an English retired cricketer. He was a right-handed batsman and leg-break bowler who played for Cambridgeshire. He was born in Whittlesey.

Howorth, who played club cricket with Peterborough, played in the Second XI Championship for Northamptonshire between 1961 and 1966.

Howorth played in miscellaneous matches for Huntingdonshire between 1966 and 1974. He made his Cambridgeshire debut against Huntingdonshire in 1975, and played for the team in competition until 1982.

Howorth made a single List A appearance for Cambridgeshire during the 1975 Gillette Cup campaign, against Northamptonshire. He scored 19 runs and took figures of 0-20 from four overs of bowling.
