= Sir William Backhouse, 1st Baronet =

Escutcheon of the Backhouse baronets of London

Sir William Backhouse, 1st Baronet (died 22 August 1669) was created a baronet in the Baronetage of England on 9 November 1660. He was the son of the merchant Nicholas Backhouse of Widford, Hertfordshire, who served as Sheriff of London, and his wife Christian Williams.

Backhouse married in 1662, as her second husband, his cousin Flower Bishop née Backhouse (1641–1700), heiress of William Backhouse of Swallowfield; her father had died that year. He was High Sheriff of Berkshire for 1664–5. He died without issue, and the baronetcy became extinct in 1669. Flower married, thirdly, Henry Hyde, Lord Cornbury.
