= Robert Rich, 5th Earl of Warwick =

Robert Rich, 2nd Earl of Holland, 5th Earl of Warwick (c. 1619 – 1675) was an English peer who sat in the House of Lords from 1660 until his death.

== Life ==
Rich was the eldest son of Henry Rich, 1st Earl of Holland (1590–1649), by his wife Isabel Cope, who had married in or before 1616. His father was a younger brother of Robert Rich, 2nd Earl of Warwick, a Puritan and later the commander of the Parliamentarian navy during the Wars of the Three Kingdoms.

In 1618 his grandfather Robert Rich was created Earl of Warwick by King James I, who in 1624 granted his father the earldom of Holland.

Rich married firstly Elizabeth Ingram, a daughter of Sir Arthur Ingram. In 1642, they had a son, Henry Rich, Lord Kensington.

A close friend of Charles I, the first Earl of Holland held important positions at court during the 1630s and was made a Knight of the Garter. When the First English Civil War began in August 1642, his cousin Robert Devereux, 3rd Earl of Essex, was commander-in-chief of the Parliamentarian army, and he and his son did not join the Royalist forces until July 1643.

A few weeks after the Execution of Charles I in January 1649, Rich's father was also executed. In theory, Rich thus gained a seat in the House of Lords on 9 March 1649, succeeding his father as Earl of Holland. But he went into exile with the future King Charles II.

In 1659, his son Lord Kensington died young, aged about seventeen.

After his first wife's death, and after the Stuart Restoration of 1660, the Earl of Holland, now sitting in the House of Lords, married a second cousin, Lady Anne Montagu, a daughter of Edward Montagu, 2nd Earl of Manchester, and of his cousin Anne Montagu (nee Rich), Viscountess Mandeville. Their son Edward Rich, the future 3rd Earl of Holland, was born about 1673. They also had a daughter, Elizabeth, who married Francis Edwardes of Haverfordwest. Her son William Edwardes eventually inherited his grandfather's estates and in 1776 was created Baron Kensington.

Also in 1673, the second Earl of Holland succeeded a cousin as Earl of Warwick and as Baron Rich, a peerage created in 1547 for their ancestor Richard Rich, 1st Baron Rich.

Warwick died in 1675 and was succeeded by his surviving son. His widow outlived him until 1689.

== Brothers and sisters ==
Warwick had at least three younger brothers, Charles Rich (died 1645), Henry Rich (died 1669), and Cope Rich (1635–1676), who was the grandfather of Edward Rich, 8th Earl of Warwick (1695–1759), the last of the Rich family to hold that peerage.

He had an older sister, Lady Frances Rich (c. 1617 – 1672), who married William Paget, 5th Baron Paget. Lady Isabella Rich (born 1623) married Sir James Thynne of Longleat. Lady Susannah Rich (c. 1628 – 1649) c. 1640 married James Howard, 3rd Earl of Suffolk, and was the mother of Lady Essex Howard. His sister Lady Mary Rich (c. 1636 – 1666), married John Campbell of Glenorchy, later Earl of Breadalbane and Holland.
