= Barbara Howard =

Barbara Howard may refer to:

- Barbara Howard, Countess of Suffolk (1622–1681), English courtier
- Barbara Howard (athlete) (1920–2017), Canadian sprinter
- Barbara Howard (artist) (1926–2002), Canadian painter, wood engraver, draughtsperson, bookbinder and designer
- Barbara Howard (actress) (born 1956), American actress
- John R. Coryell or Barbara Howard, American dime novelist
- Barbara Howard (Abbott Elementary), a fictional character on theTV series Abbott Elementary portrayed by Sheryl Lee Ralph
