= Mary Parker =

Mary Parker may refer to:

== People ==
- Mary Parker (American actress) (1918–1998), American stage, television and screen actress/performer
- Mary Parker (Australian actress) (1930–2023), English (later Australian) actress and news reporter; first woman to appear on Melbourne television
- Mary Parker (German actress) (1902–?), German actress of the silent era
- Mary Parker, governess of Erasmus Darwin
- Mary Parker, Jr. (1774–1859), daughter of Erasmus Darwin, born of an extra-marital affair
- Mary Elizabeth Parker, American poet
- Mary Elizabeth Parker Bouligny (1839–1908), author and socialite
- Mary Evelyn Parker (1920–2015), Democratic state treasurer of Louisiana
- Mary-Louise Parker (born 1964), American actress
- Mary Parker Follett (1868–1933), American social worker and management consultant
- Mary Parker Lewis, political consultant who served as chief of staff to Alan Keyes, candidate for president of the United States
- Mary Parker (Salem witch trials) (died 1692), executed for witchcraft in the Salem witch trials
- Mary Parker (ice hockey), American women's ice hockey player
- Mary Parker, Countess of Macclesfield (died 1823)
- Mary Ann Parker (1765–1848), English traveller and writer
- Mary Celestia Parler (1904–1981), folklorist, sometimes known as Mary Parker
- Mary Parker Converse (1872–1961), née Parker, first woman to be commissioned by the United States Merchant Marine
- Mary Parker Woodworth (1849–1919), née Parker, American writer and speaker on educational and missionary topics

== Characters ==
- Richard and Mary Parker, comic book characters (parents of Spider-Man)
- Mary Jane Parker, comic book character (one-time wife of Spider-Man)

== See also ==
- Mary (disambiguation)
- Parker (disambiguation)
