= Lady of the Bedchamber =

Personal attendant on a British queen or princess

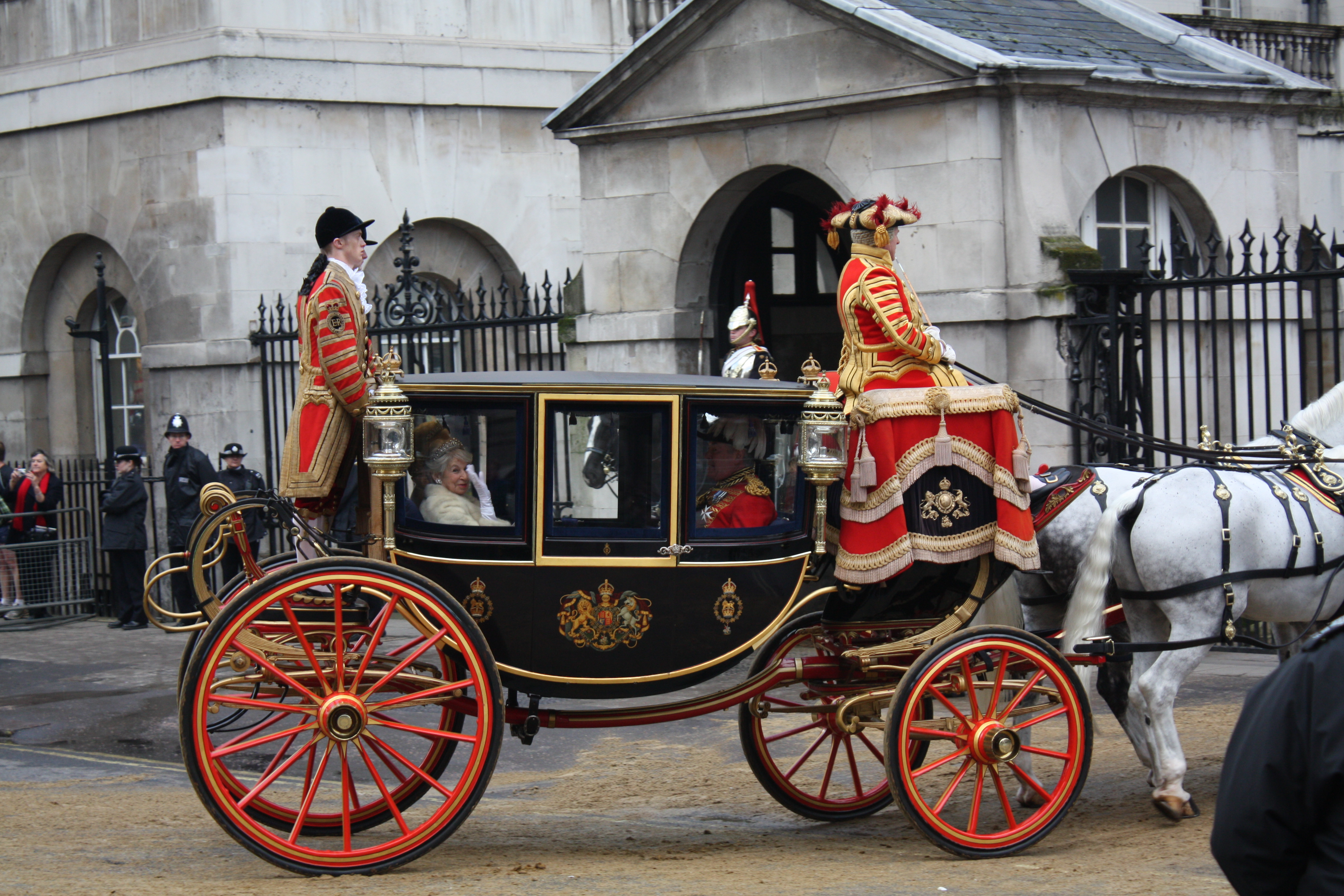
The Countess of Airlie returns to Buckingham Palace in a carriage in 2008, having attended the State Opening of Parliament in her capacity as lady of the Bedchamber to Queen Elizabeth II (a position she held from 1973 until the Queen's death in 2022).

Lady of the Bedchamber is the title of a lady-in-waiting holding the official position of personal attendant on a British queen regnant or queen consort. The position is traditionally held by the wife of a peer. A lady of the bedchamber would give instructions to the women of the bedchamber on what their queen wished them to do, or may carry out those duties herself.

The equivalent title and office has historically been used in most European royal courts (Dutch: Dames du Palais; French: Dames or Dame de Palais; German: Hofstaatsdame or Palastdame; Italian: Dame di Corte; Russian: Hofdame or Statsdame; Spanish: Dueña de honor; Swedish: Statsfru).

== History ==
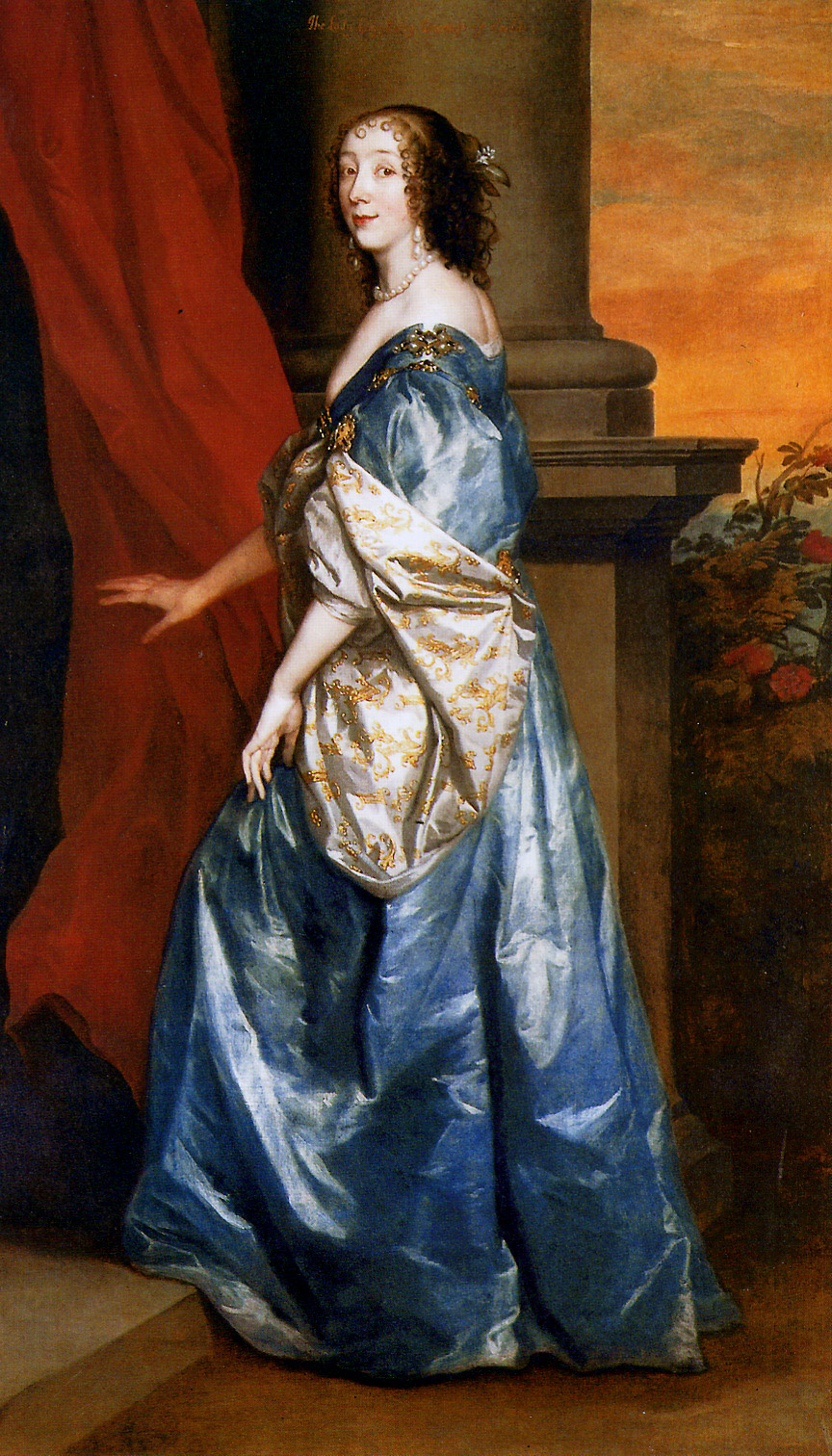
Lucy Hay, Countess of Carlisle, Lady of the Bedchamber to Queen Henrietta Maria.

In the Middle Ages, Margaret of France is noted to have had seven ladies of the bedchamber: the three married ones were called dominæ and the four unmarried ones were known as maids of honour. Their task was simply to act as the companions (see lady's companion) and personal attendants to the royal woman.

In a description from 1728, the task of the ladies of the bedchamber was to act as the go-between for the queen and the women of the bedchamber, who had the task to wait upon the queen by helping her wash, dress and undress, and so forth. A woman of the bedchamber worked independently from a lady of the bedchamber and did not take orders from her. However, if a lady of the bedchamber was present, a woman of the bedchamber would always defer to her. If a lady of the bedchamber was present when a woman of the bedchamber arrived to dress the queen, for example, she would not dress the queen herself, but instead give the garments to the lady of the bedchamber, who in turn helped the queen put it on. The procedure was the same in other issues.

The post of a lady of the bedchamber was considered prestigious, and the appointments have therefore been subjected to controversies. Queen Anne appointed Sarah Churchill, Duchess of Marlborough, to this position; the Duchess was widely considered an influential royal favourite. In 1839, concerns that Queen Victoria was determined to surround herself with wives of Whig politicians led to the Bedchamber crisis, preventing the installation of a Tory government under Robert Peel.

== Ladies of the bedchamber to the queens of England ==
This is an incomplete list of those who have served as Lady of the Bedchamber in the English royal household. In Tudor England, the lady of the Bedchamber was often called Lady of the Privy Chamber.

=== Catherine of Aragon, 1509–1536 ===
- Anne Bourchier, Lady Dacre of the South
- Margaret Brent (?), Lady Bergavenny
- Mabel Dacre, Lady Scrope
- Mary Grey, Lady Ferrers of Chartley
- Lady Anne Percy, Lady Maltravers, Countess of Arundel
- Inez de Venegas, Lady Mountjoy (Lord Mountjoy’s 2nd wife)
- Elizabeth Willoughby, Lady Maltravers
- María de Salinas

=== Anne Boleyn, 1533–1536 ===
- Mary Howard, Duchess of Richmond
- Eleanor Paston, Countess of Rutland
- Isabel Legh, Lady Baynton

=== Jane Seymour, 1536–1537 ===
- Mary Arundell
- Eleanor Paston, Countess of Rutland
- Isabel Legh, Lady Baynton
- Cecily Arundell

=== Anne of Cleves, 1540–1540 ===
- Mary Arundell
- Frances Brandon, Marchioness of Dorset
- Margaret Douglas
- Elizabeth Grey, Lady Audley
- Mary Howard, Duchess of Richmond
- Eleanor Paston, Countess of Rutland
- Jane Guildford, Lady Dudley
- Isabel Legh, Lady Baynton
- Jane Parker, Lady Rochford
- Katherine Edgcumbe

=== Catherine Howard, 1540–1541 ===
- Eleanor Paston, Countess of Rutland
- Jane Guildford, Lady Dudley
- Jane Parker, Lady Rochford

=== Mary I, 1553–1558 ===
- Jane Dormer
- Cecily Arundell

=== Elizabeth I, 1558–1603 ===
- 1558–1565: Katherine Ashley (née Champernowne), Lady Ashley
- 1559–1569: Catherine Carey, Lady Knollys, also 1st Cousin or half-Sister to Elizabeth I
- 1564: Catherine Paget, Baroness of Beaudesert
- 1568–1599: Elizabeth Stafford
- 1587: Frances Newton, Baroness Cobham
- 1591: Lady Margaret Hawkins

=== Anne of Denmark, 1603–1619 ===
Anne of Denmark was Queen Consort to James I of England.

- 1603–1619: Lucy Russell, Countess of Bedford
- 1603–1607: Penelope Blount, Countess of Devonshire
- 1603–1619: Anne Livingstone, Countess of Eglinton
- 1603–1619: Elizabeth Schaw, Countess of Annandale
- 1603–1617: Jane Drummond, Countess of Roxburghe
- 1603–1619: Bridget Annesley
- 1603–1609: Cecily Bulstrode
- 1603–1619: Dorothy Bulstrode
- 1604–1609: Bridget Markham
- 1603–1618: Jane Meautys
- 1604–1619: Mary Middlemore
- 1608–1619: Dorothy Silking

=== Henrietta Maria of France, 1625–1649 ===
Henrietta Maria was Queen Consort to Charles I of England. Queen Henrietta Maria had a French Household when she first arrived in England in 1625, and it was not until her French entourage was sent home in 1626-1627 that her English Household was fully installed.

- 1626: Elizabeth Conquest (née Thimbelby), daughter of Sir Richard Thimelby of Irnham, married Sir Richard Conquest of Houghton Conquest
- 1626: Lucy Hay, Countess of Carlisle
- 1626: Katherine Villiers, Duchess of Buckingham
- 1626: Mary Hamilton, Marchioness of Hamilton
- 1626: Mary Beaumont, Countess of Buckinham
- 1626: Isabella Rich, Countess of Holland
- 1626: Elisabeth, Viscountess Savage, Countess of Rivers

=== Catherine of Braganza, 1662–1692 ===
Catherine of Braganza was Queen Consort to Charles II of England

- 1663–1667: Katherine Stanhope, Countess of Chesterfield
- 1663–1673: Barbara Palmer, Countess of Castlemaine
- 1663–1681: Barbara Howard, Countess of Suffolk
- 1663–1688: Mary Villiers, Duchess of Buckingham
- 1663–1688: Jane Granville, Countess of Bath

=== Mary of Modena, 1673–1688 ===
Mary of Modena was Queen Consort to James II of England

- Elizabeth Herbert, Marchioness of Powis

=== Mary II, 1689–1694 ===
- 1689–1694 : Mary Sackville, Countess of Dorset (1669–1691)
- 1689–1694 : Gertrude Savile, Marchioness of Hallifax
- 1689–1694 : Frances Lumley, Viscountess Lumley
- 1689–1694 : Elizabeth Windsor, Countess of Plymouth
- 1689–1694 : Frances Paulet, Countess of Wiltshire
- 1691–1694 : Anne Finch, Countess of Nottingham

== Ladies of the bedchamber to the queens of Great Britain ==
=== Anne, 1702–1714 ===
- 1702: Mary Butler, Duchess of Ormonde
- 1702: Marchioness of Hartington
- 1702: Juliana Boyle, Countess of Burlington
- 1702: Countess of Scarbrough
- 1702–1712: Lady Spencer
- 1702: Elizabeth Seymour, Duchess of Somerset
- 1702: Lady Hyde
- 1702: Lady Frescheville
- 1702: Lady H. Godolphin
- 1702–1705: Anne Venables-Bertie, Countess of Abingdon
- 1702: Lady C. Boeverwart
- 1704–1714: Abigail Masham, Baroness Masham
- 1704–1712: Lady Spencer
- 1712–1714: Anne Venables-Bertie, Countess of Abingdon
- 1712: Lady Catharine Hyde

=== Caroline of Ansbach, 1714–1737 ===
Caroline of Ansbach was Queen Consort to George II of Great Britain

- 1714–1717: Louisa Berkeley, Countess of Berkeley
- 1714–1717 & 1726: Diana Beauclerk, Duchess of St Albans
- 1714–1717: Henrietta Paulet, Duchess of Bolton
- 1714–1717: Mary Montagu, Duchess of Montagu
- 1714–1724: Mary Cowper, Countess Cowper
- 1714–1726: Adelhida Talbot, Duchess of Shrewsbury
- 1714–1737: Elizabeth Sackville, Duchess of Dorset
- 1717–1717: Elizabeth Montagu, Viscountess Hinchingbrooke
- 1718–1721: Barbara Herbert, Countess of Pembroke
- 1718–1724: Henrietta d'Auverquerque, Countess of Grantham
- 1718–1737: Elizabeth Hervey, Countess of Bristol
- 1718–1720: Anne Scott, Countess of Deloraine
- 1722–1722: Jane Capell, Countess of Essex
- 1724–1737: Frances Seymour, Countess of Hertford
- 1724–1737: Sarah Lennox, Duchess of Richmond
- 1725–1737: Anne van Keppel, Countess of Albemarle
- 1725–1737: Henrietta Fermor, Countess of Pomfret
- 1725–1737: Mary Herbert, Countess of Pembroke (extra)
- 1727–1737: Henrietta Louisa Fermor
- 1727–1737: Dorothy Boyle, Countess of Cork (extra)

=== Charlotte of Mecklenburg-Strelitz, 1761–1818 ===
Charlotte of Mecklenburg-Strelitz was Queen Consort to King George III of Great Britain

- 1761–1768: Diana St John, Viscountess Bolingbroke
- 1761–1770: Elizabeth Percy, Countess of Northumberland (Duchess of Northumberland from 1766)
- 1761–1784: Elizabeth Campbell, Duchess of Hamilton (Duchess of Argyll from 1770)
- 1761–1791: Elizabeth Howard, Countess of Effingham
- 1761–1793: Elizabeth Thynne, Viscountess Weymouth (Marchioness of Bath from 1789)
- 1761–1794: Alicia Wyndham, Countess of Egremont
- 1768–1782: Isabella Seymour, Countess of Hertford
- 1770–1801: Mary Darcy, Countess of Holderness
- 1783–1818: Elizabeth Herbert, Countess of Pembroke and Montgomery
- 1784–1818: Elizabeth Harcourt, Countess Harcourt
- 1791–1818: Elizabeth Townshend, Viscountess Sydney
- 1793–1807: Elizabeth Brudenell, Countess of Cardigan
- 1794–1818: Jane Stanhope, Countess of Harrington
- 1801–1818: Mary Parker, Countess of Macclesfield
- 1807–1813: Henrietta Stanhope, Countess of Chesterfield
- 1813–1818: Anne Dundas, Viscountess Melville

== Ladies of the bedchamber to the queens of the United Kingdom ==
=== Caroline of Brunswick, 1795–1821 ===
Caroline of Brunswick was the wife of George, Prince of Wales, Prince Regent and from 1820 Queen Consort to George IV of the United Kingdom. They separated in 1796 and she died in 1821.

- 1795–1796: Frances Villiers, Countess of Jersey
- 1795–1821: Countess of Carnarvon
- 1795–1821: Marchioness Townshend
- 1795–1802: Countess Cholmondeley
- 1808–1817: Lady Charlotte Lindsay
- 1809–1821: Lady Charlotte Campbell
- 1809–1813 & 1820–1821: Lady Ann Hamilton
- 1820–1821: Lady Emma Caroline Wood

=== Adelaide of Saxe-Meiningen, 1830–1837 ===
Adelaide of Saxe-Meiningen was Queen Consort to William IV of the United Kingdom

- 1830–1837: Emily Nugent, Marchioness of Westmeath
- 1830–1837: Arabella Bourke, Countess of Mayo
- 1830–1849: Marianne Wellesley, Marchioness Wellesley
- 1830–1834: Anna Loftus, Marchioness of Ely (extra 1834–1837)
- 1830–1837: Emma Brownlow, Countess Brownlow
- 1830–1837: Lady Harriet Clinton
- 1833–1836: Harriet Howe, Countess Howe
- 1836–1837: Harriet Holroyd, Countess of Sheffield

=== Victoria, 1837–1901 ===
- 1837–1838: Louisa Petty-FitzMaurice, Marchioness of Lansdowne
- 1837–1838: Louisa Lambton, Countess of Durham
- 1837–1841: Maria Phipps, Marchioness of Normanby
- 1837–1841: Anna Russell, Duchess of Bedford
- 1837–1842: Sarah Lyttelton, Baroness Lyttelton, then Governess (Lady Superintendent) of the Royal Children 1842–1850.
- 1837–1842: Frances Noel, Countess of Gainsborough
- 1837–1851: Emma Portman, Baroness Portman
- 1837–1854: Anne Caulfield, Countess of Charlemont
- 1838–1840: Blanche Cavendish, Countess of Burlington
- 1839-1839: Elizabeth Campbell, Marchioness of Breadalbane
- 1839–1842: Mary Montagu, Countess of Sandwich
- 1840–1854 & 1863–1865: Carolina Edgcumbe, Countess of Mount Edgcumbe
- 1841–1845: Catherine Murray, Countess of Dunmore
- 1841–1867: Frances Jocelyn, Viscountess Jocelyn (extra 1867–1880)
- 1842–1842: Susan Broun-Ramsay, Countess of Dalhousie
- 1842–1843: Charlotte Fitzalan-Howard, Duchess of Norfolk
- 1842–1855: Charlotte Canning, Countess Canning
- 1843–1858: Elizabeth Wellesley, Duchess of Wellington
- 1845–1864: Elizabeth Cuffe, Countess of Desart
- 1851–1889: Jane Loftus, Marchioness of Ely
- 1854–1897: Anne Murray, Duchess of Atholl
- 1854–1900: Jane Spencer, Baroness Churchill
- 1855–1863: Maria Bosville-Macdonald, Baroness Macdonald
- 1858–1878: Jane Alexander, Countess of Caledon
- 1864–1890: Elizabeth Cavendish, Baroness Waterpark
- 1865–1895: Susanna Innes-Ker, Duchess of Roxburghe
- 1867–1872: Eliza Agar-Ellis, Viscountess Clifden
- 1872–1874: Blanche Bourke, Countess of Mayo
- 1873–1901: Eliza Hay, Countess of Erroll
- 1874–1885: Julia Abercromby, Baroness Abercromby
- 1878–1901: Ismania FitzRoy, Baroness Southampton
- 1885–1901: Emily Russell, Baroness Ampthill
- 1889–1901: Cecilia Dawnay, Viscountess Downe
- 1890–1901: Louisa McDonnell, Countess of Antrim
- 1895–1901: Edith Bulwer-Lytton, Countess of Lytton
- 1897–1901: Anne Innes-Ker, Duchess of Roxburghe

=== Alexandra of Denmark, 1901–1925 ===
Alexandra of Denmark was Queen Consort to Edward VII of the United Kingdom

- 1900–1910: Alice Stanley, Countess of Derby
- 1901–1910: Louisa McDonnell, Countess of Antrim
- 1901–1925: Louisa Acheson, Countess of Gosford
- 1901–1905: Edith Bulwer-Lytton, Countess of Lytton
- 1901–1911: Cecilia Harbord, Baroness Suffield
- 1901–1907: Alice Douglas, Countess of Morton (Extra Lady of the Bedchamber 1901–?)
- 1901–1912: Mary Parker, Countess of Macclesfield (Extra Lady of the Bedchamber 1901–?)
- 1901–1905: Maud Petty-FitzMaurice, Marchioness of Lansdowne (extra)
- 1905–1910: Maud Petty-FitzMaurice, Marchioness of Lansdowne
- 1905–1910: Constance Ashley-Cooper, Countess of Shaftesbury (extra)
- 1907–1910: Cecily Gascoyne-Cecil, Marchioness of Salisbury
- 1910–1914: Winifred Hardinge, Baroness Hardinge of Penshurst (extra)
- 1910–1925: Maud Petty-FitzMaurice, Marchioness of Lansdowne (extra)
- 1910–1925: Cecily Gascoyne-Cecil, Marchioness of Salisbury (extra)
- 1910–1925: Alice Stanley, Countess of Derby (extra)
- 1911–1925: Cecilia Carington, Marchioness of Lincolnshire (Countess Carrington 1911–1912)

=== Mary of Teck, 1901–1953 ===
Mary of Teck was Queen Consort to George V of the United Kingdom

- 1901–1902: Ida Bridgeman, Countess of Bradford
- 1901–1910: Mabell Ogilvy, Countess of Airlie
- 1902–1910: Mary Cochrane-Baillie, Baroness Lamington
- 1905–1906: Constance Ashley-Cooper, Countess of Shaftesbury (extra)
- 1905–1936: Ida Bridgeman, Countess of Bradford (extra)
- 1906–1913: Constance Ashley-Cooper, Countess of Shaftesbury
- 1910–1916: Mabell Ogilvy, Countess of Airlie (extra)
- 1910–1917: Mary Cochrane-Baillie, Baroness Lamington(extra)
- 1911–1916: Ethel Grenfell, Baroness Desborough
- 1911–1936: Mary Elliot-Murray-Kynynmound, Countess of Minto
- 1911–1953: Margaret Russell, Baroness Ampthill
- 1913–1924: Emily Fortescue, Countess Fortescue
- 1913–1953: Constance Ashley-Cooper, Countess of Shaftesbury (extra)
- 1916–1924: Ethel Grenfell, Baroness Desborough (extra)
- 1916–1953: Mabell Ogilvy, Countess of Airlie
- 1924–1929: Emily Fortescue, Countess Fortescue (extra)
- 1924–1936: Ethel Grenfell, Baroness Desborough
- 1938-1951: Hon. Margaret Blanche Wyndham
- 1951-1953: Hon. Margaret Blanche Wyndham (Extra)
- 1936–1940: Mary Elliot-Murray-Kynynmound, Countess of Minto (extra)
- 1936–1952: Ethel Grenfell, Baroness Desborough (extra)

=== Elizabeth Bowes-Lyon, 1937–2002 ===
Elizabeth Bowes-Lyon was Queen Consort to George VI of the United Kingdom

- 1937–1947: Mary Wilson, Baroness Nunburnholme
- 1937–1972: Cynthia Spencer, Countess Spencer
- 1937–1941: Dorothy Wood, Viscountess Halifax
- 1937–1994: Patricia Smith, Viscountess Hambleden
- 1941–1945: Beatrice Ormsby-Gore, Baroness Harlech
- 1945–1967: Beatrice Ormsby-Gore, Baroness Harlech
- 1947–1979: Katharine Lumley, Countess of Scarbrough
- 1973–2002: Elizabeth Beckett, Baroness Grimthorpe
- 1994–2002: Elizabeth Lumley, Countess of Scarbrough

=== Elizabeth II, 1953–2022 ===
- 1953–1966: Fortune FitzRoy, Countess of Euston (later the Duchess of Grafton and subsequently Dowager Duchess)
- 1953–1973: Elizabeth Coke, Countess of Leicester, wife of Thomas Coke, 5th Earl of Leicester
- 1960–1966: Patricia Nevill, Marchioness of Abergavenny (extra)
- 1966–1987: Patricia Nevill, Marchioness of Abergavenny
- 1967–1971: Esmé Baring, née Harmsworth, Countess of Cromer (temporary) wife of Rowland Baring, 3rd Earl of Cromer
- 1967–1969: Sonia Fairfax, Lady Fairfax of Cameron (temporary) (widow of Thomas Fairfax, 13th Lord Fairfax of Cameron)
- 1971–1993: Esmé Baring, née Harmsworth, Countess of Cromer (extra)
- 1973–2022: Virginia Ogilvy, Countess of Airlie
- 1987–2005: Patricia Nevill, Marchioness of Abergavenny (extra)
- 1987–2021: Diana Maxwell, Baroness Farnham

== See also ==
- Dame du Palais, French equivalent
- Statsfru, Swedish equivalent
