= Henry Hyde, 2nd Earl of Clarendon =

English aristocrat and politician

The Right Honourable The Earl of Clarendon PC
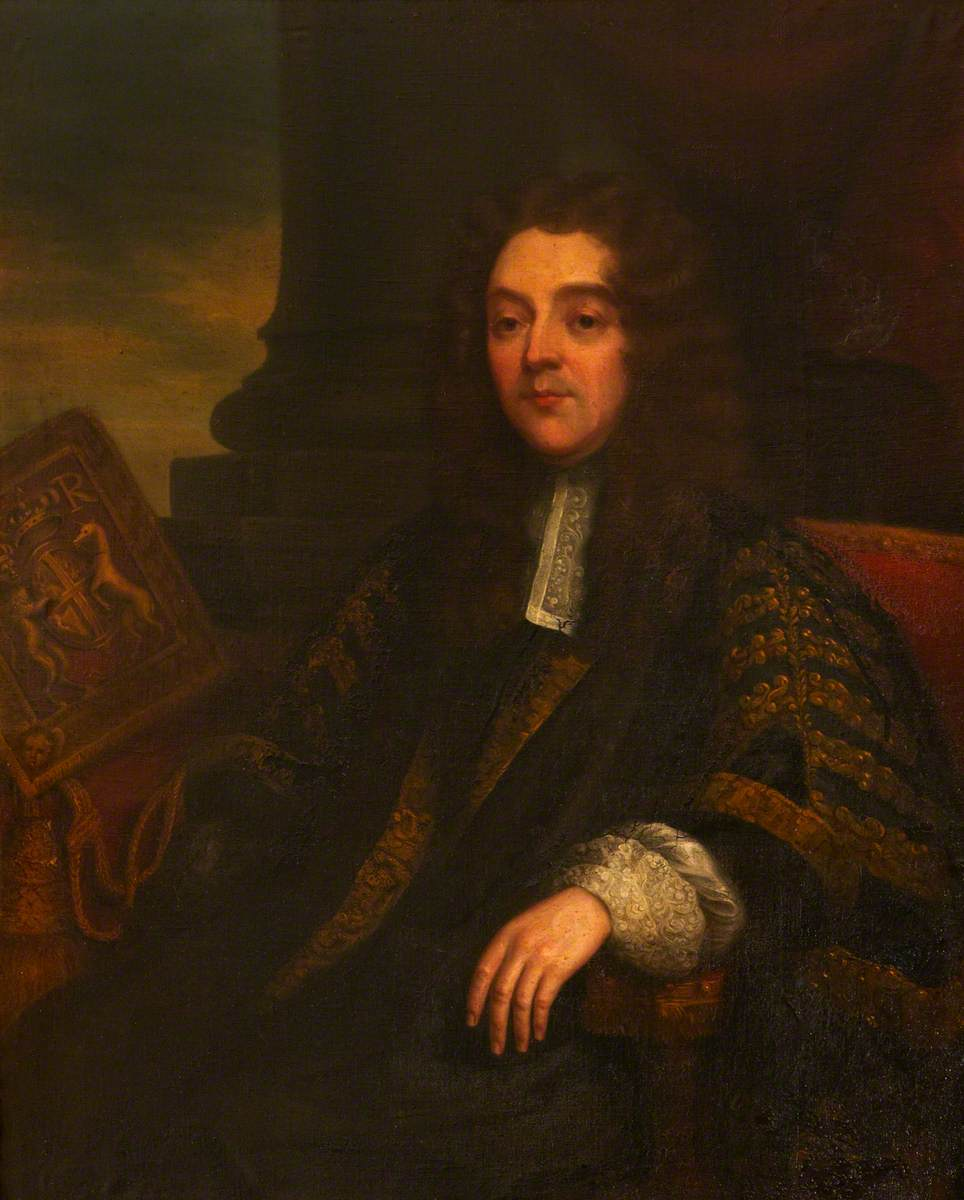

Lord Privy Seal
- In office 1685–1687
- Preceded by: George Saville, 1st Marquess of Halifax
- Succeeded by: Henry Arundell, 3rd Baron Arundell of Wardour

Lord-Lieutenant of Ireland
- In office 1685–1687
- Preceded by: Lords Justices
- Succeeded by: Richard Talbot, 1st Earl of Tyrconnell

Personal details
- Born: 2 June 1638
- Died: 31 October 1709 (aged 71)
- Spouse(s): Theodosia Capell (died 1661); Flower Backhouse
- Children: Edward Hyde, 3rd Earl of Clarendon
- Parent(s): Edward Hyde, 1st Earl of Clarendon; Frances Aylesbury
- Relatives: Anne Hyde (sister); Laurence Hyde (brother)

Henry Hyde, 2nd Earl of Clarendon, PC (2 June 1638 – 31 October 1709) was an English aristocrat and politician. He held high office at the beginning of the reign of his brother-in-law, King James II.

== Early life ==
He was the eldest son of Edward Hyde, 1st Earl of Clarendon, and his second wife, Frances Aylesbury. He was thus a brother of Anne Hyde (first wife of the future James II of England), and maternal uncle to both Queen Mary II and Queen Anne. Both he and his brother Laurence Hyde were brought up partly at Antwerp and Breda, by their mother. Clarendon before 1660 made use of Henry as copyist, decipherer, and confidential secretary, in his correspondence with distant royalists.

== Under Charles II ==
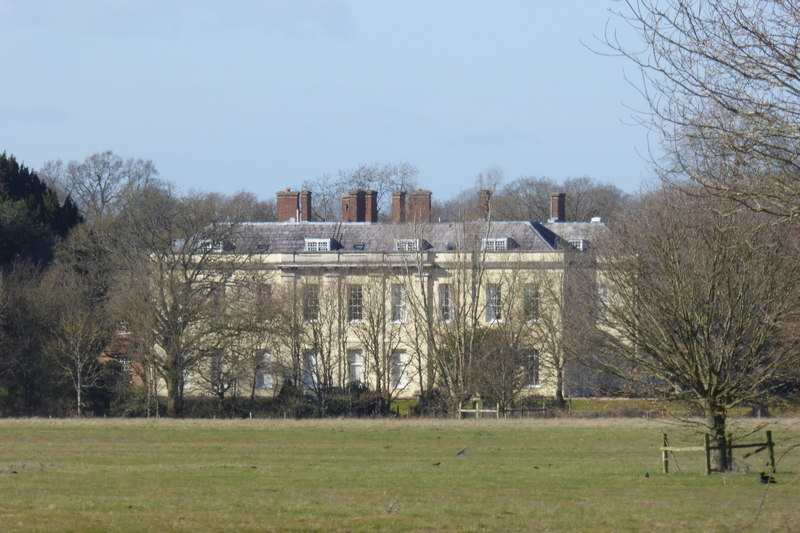
Swallowfield Park house

Soon after the return of his family to England, in 1660, Hyde married Theodosia Capell, daughter of Arthur Capell, 1st Baron Capell of Hadham, and Elizabeth Morrison, and sister of Mary Capell, Duchess of Beaufort. She died in 1661, and in 1670, he married secondly to Flower Backhouse, daughter of William Backhouse and Anne Richards, and widow of William Bishop and Sir William Backhouse (kinsman of her father), gaining the manor and house of Swallowfield Park, Berkshire, where he rebuilt the house. Later she was First Lady of the Bedchamber to Queen Anne. Queen Anne later took a dislike to her aunt, no doubt influenced by her best friend, Sarah Churchill, Duchess of Marlborough; Sarah detested Flower, whom she called "the madwoman". Hyde had the courtesy title Lord Cornbury, from 1661. He was Member of Parliament for Wiltshire, until 1674.

In 1662 he was appointed private secretary to Queen Catherine, whose lord chamberlain he became in July 1665; in later years he may have regretted the appointment, as he and the Queen became embroiled in an almost interminable lawsuit over the arrears of her allowance. John Evelyn in 1664 helped him to plant Cornbury Park. He spoke on behalf of his father on his impeachment in 1667; and after his fall Lord Cornbury became an opponent of the court party and the Cabal Ministry, and attacked Buckingham and Arlington. On his father's death in 1674 he succeeded to the earldom of Clarendon. In 1680, the influence of his brother-in-law James, Duke of York, made him a privy councillor. Around the same time, he was named keeper of Denmark House and treasurer and receiver-general of the queen's revenues. At this time, and often, he had money troubles.

The friendship of the Duke of York led to his inclusion with his brother Lawrence in the group whom the Commons early in January 1681 told the king were persons inclined to popery. By now a court loyalist, he was in a position to visit in the Tower of London both Arthur Capell, 1st Earl of Essex (brother to his first wife), in 1683, and in the next reign the Duke of Monmouth, and to plead the cause of Alice Lisle when she had been sentenced by Judge George Jeffreys.

== Under James II ==
In 1685, Henry's brother-in-law, King James II, appointed him Lord Privy Seal. A few months later, the office was put into commission, and he was made Lord-Lieutenant of Ireland.

=== In Ireland ===
Richard Talbot, 1st Earl of Tyrconnell, had been summoned to London from the command of the military forces in Ireland about the date when Clarendon set out for Dublin (December 1685). On 9 January 1686 the new Lord-Lieutenant arrived in Dublin. He found his authority overshadowed by that of the absent commander-in-chief. Shortly Clarendon was told by Robert Spencer, 2nd Earl of Sunderland of the king's intention to introduce Roman Catholics into the Irish judicial and administrative system, as well as into the Irish Army. Clarendon warned bishops and preachers against offending Catholic feeling, and admitted Catholics as councillors and as officers of the army; and he urged their admission into town corporations. He made half-hearted protests to the king. In June 1686 Tyrconnell returned with full powers as commander-in-chief; Clarendon clung to his office.

Tyrconnell transformed the army; and in August 1686 he visited England to obtain the king's permission for legislation to replace the Act of Settlement 1662. Clarendon sent many protests to both king and queen during his rival's absence; but as his brother Lawrence (now Earl of Rochester) saw his influence dwindle, he came to the conclusion that no hope of retaining his post in Ireland remained except through the queen. About three weeks after the dismissal of Rochester (8 January 1687), he received his letter of recall from Sunderland. Tyrconnell, who took Clarendon's place had a final interview with him on 8 February. On 21 February Clarendon landed at Neston in Cheshire, carrying with him the account books of the stores.

=== Loss of office ===
Henry and his brother, the Earl of Rochester, had fallen from the king's favour and were dismissed from office. The Privy Seal was given on 16 March 1687 to a Catholic, Henry Arundell, 3rd Baron Arundell of Wardour, and Clarendon withdrew for a while into private life. He had a marriage project of his eldest son, now Lord Cornbury, and money to raise for a settlement on the encumbered family estates. He engaged in speculations, ranging from the digging for coal in Windsor forest to the traffic of Scotch pedlars. A pension was conferred on him by James II about the beginning of 1688.

He advised the bishops in the Tower of London concerning their bail, and was asked by Jeffreys to use his good offices with William Sancroft. The Queen, on whose council he had been placed in 1681, sought him out. On 24 September 1688, the day after her friendly reception of him, Clarendon found the king himself, in view of the Dutch preparations for invasion, anxious to 'see what the Church of England men will do.' He became more resolute, and on 22 October, at the council summoned by the king to hear his declaration concerning the birth of the Prince of Wales, declined to sit by the side of Father Edward Petre, and asked to attend as a peer only.

Nine days after the landing of William of Orange Lord Cornbury deserted from the King to him (14 November), a turning point; and very difficult for Clarendon. (Mary, wife of William, was Henry's niece.) In the council of peers called by the King on his return to discuss the question of summoning a free parliament (27 November) Clarendon argued against the royal policy; and on 1 December he set out for Salisbury to make his peace with William. On 3 December he had an interview with William at Berwick, near Hindon, Wiltshire, and offered him his support. He was present at the Hungerford conference on 8 December, and followed the advance of the prince as far as Henley, where, on 13 December he obtained leave of absence. By the prince's desire he waited on him again at Windsor on 16 December, and presented to him his brother Rochester. It was at the conference held at Windsor that Clarendon was said to have suggested the confinement of King James to the Tower; while, according to Gilbert Burnet he proposed his relegation to Breda. He himself declared that, except at the Windsor meeting, he had never been present at any discussion about what should be done with King James, but that he was against the king being sent away. He was informed by William himself that the King had fled.

== Jacobite ==
Clarendon took a Tory line, rejecting the Whig assumption that King James had abdicated, and the settlement of the crown upon William III and Mary II. He spoke to this effect in parliament, and he refused to take the oaths to the new government. William took it badly that Clarendon had represented him as hostile to the Church of England. Clarendon was in touch with Richard Graham, 1st Viscount Preston, a Jacobite plotter. On 24 June, Queen Mary II ordered her uncle arrested, and the next day he was in the Tower of London. There he stayed, not especially well treated though he was allowed the company of his wife for a time, until 15 August. After his liberation, the plotting resumed. When Lord Preston on 31 December 1690 was arrested on the Thames River, the letters found upon him included one from Clarendon to King James. Preston named Clarendon among his accomplices; Clarendon, who from 4 January 1691, after being examined before the cabinet council, had been once more consigned to the Tower, remained there for several months. In July he was allowed into the country under the care of his warder, and his release on bail soon followed.

== Later life ==
The remainder of Clarendon's life was passed in tranquillity at his residences in the country, troubled only by his almost endless lawsuit with the Dowager Queen Catherine. Cornbury House was in 1694, owing to money difficulties, denuded of many of the pictures collected by his father, and of at least a great part of its library; and in 1697, or shortly before, was sold by Clarendon to Rochester, though to spare his pride the sale was kept a secret till his death. The publication (1702–1704) of the first edition, in three volumes, of the History of the Rebellion by the first Earl, was mostly the work of Rochester; but Clarendon took an interest, and in 1704 he presented John Evelyn with the three printed volumes. Queen Anne would not receive him at Court, as a "diehard" Jacobite, but she did pay him a pension.

Clarendon died on 31 October 1709. His Diary (1687–1690) and Correspondence, with the letters of his younger brother Rochester, first appeared in 1828; it was edited by Samuel Weller Singer from manuscripts of William Upcott. He had a fine collection of medals, and was the author of the History and Antiquities of the Cathedral Church at Winchester, continued by Samuel Gale, London, 1715.

== Notes ==
Attribution

This article incorporates text from a publication now in the public domain: "Hyde, Henry (1638-1709)". Dictionary of National Biography. London: Smith, Elder & Co. 1885–1900.

Political offices
Preceded by The Marquess of Halifax	Lord Privy Seal; 1685–1687	Succeeded by The Lord Arundell of Wardour
Preceded by Lords Justices	Lord-Lieutenant of Ireland; 1685–1687	Succeeded by The Earl of Tyrconnell
Honorary titles
Preceded by The Viscount Falkland	Custos Rotulorum of Oxfordshire; 1663–1689	Succeeded by The Earl of Abingdon
Peerage of England
Preceded by Edward Hyde	Earl of Clarendon; 1674–1709	Succeeded by Edward Hyde
