= Elizabeth Hervey =

Elizabeth Hervey may refer to

- Elizabeth Cavendish, Duchess of Devonshire (1758–1824), née Hervey
- Elizabeth Hervey (writer) (c. 1748 – c. 1820), British novelist
- Elizabeth Hervey, Countess of Bristol (1676–1741)
- Elizabeth Hervey (1698–1727), daughter of Elizabeth Hervey, Countess of Bristol

== See also ==
- Elizabeth Harvey (historian), British historian
- Elizabeth Harvey (born 1946), Australian politician
