= Flower Backhouse, Countess of Clarendon =

English courtier

Flower Backhouse, Countess of Clarendon (died 17 July 1700) was an English courtier, notable as First Lady of the Bedchamber to Princess Anne, the future Queen Anne of Great Britain. She was Countess of Clarendon from 1670 until her death.

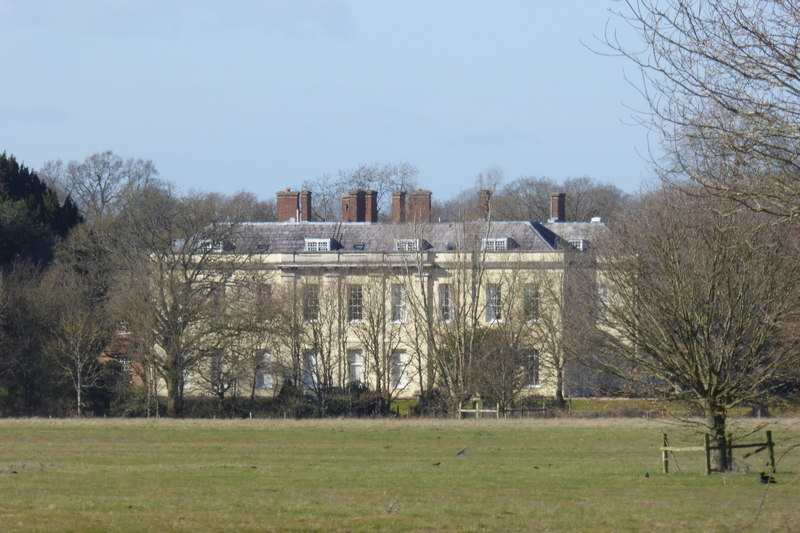
Swallowfield Park House

== Life ==
She was the daughter of the philosopher William Backhouse and his wife, the former Ann Richards. (Other sources say she was the daughter of Sir John Backhouse by his wife, the former Flower Henshaw.)

She was married three times, her first marriage being to William Bishop of South Warnborough, sometime prior to 1662. Following Bishop's death, she married secondly her father's cousin, Sir William Backhouse, 1st Baronet, at St Andrew Holborn on 23 November 1662; Backhouse died in 1669. From her second husband she inherited nine shares in the New River Company.

She married her third husband, Henry Hyde, Lord Cornbury, on 19 October 1670, as his second wife. This gained Clarendon the manor and house of Swallowfield Park, Berkshire. Hyde became Earl of Clarendon in 1676.

Clarendon was brother to Queen Anne's mother Anne Hyde and sometime after her third marriage Backhouse became Anne's First Lady of the Bedchamber. However, Backhouse was hated by Anne's best friend Sarah Churchill, who called her "the madwoman" and may have brought about Anne's later dislike of Backhouse.
