= First Lady of the Bedchamber =

Highest ranking personal attendant on a queen or princess

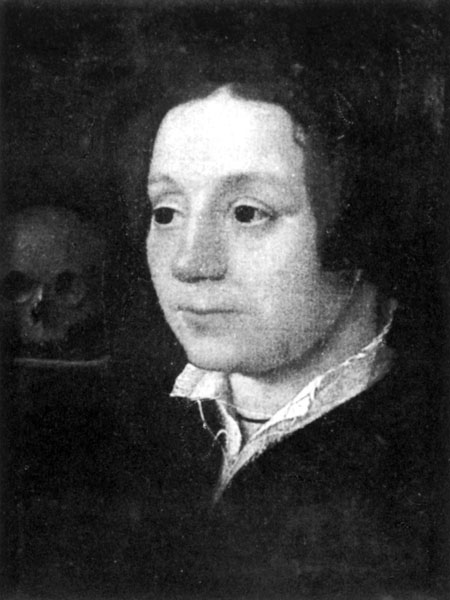
Portrait of "Kat" Ashley by an unknown artist. Collection of Lord Hastings

In British Royal Households, First Lady of the Bedchamber is the title of the highest of the ladies of the bedchamber, those holding the official position of personal attendants on a queen or princess. The title had its equivalent in several European royal courts. The position is traditionally held by a female member of a noble family.

== History ==
In the Middle Ages, Margaret of France, Queen of England, is noted to have had seven ladies-in-waiting: the three married ones were called Domina and the four unmarried maid of honour, but no principal lady-in-waiting is mentioned.

During the Tudor dynasty (1485–1603), the First Lady of the Bedchamber was called Chief Gentlewoman of the Privy Chamber. She had the highest rank among the Ladies of the bedchamber, and their role was to act as the attendants and companions of the royal woman. The First Lady of the Bedchamber of a queen consort was the equivalent of the post of First Lord of the Bedchamber to a king.

== First ladies of the bedchamber to English queens ==
=== Elizabeth I ===
Under Elizabeth the role was also known as "Chief Gentlewoman of the Privy Chamber", for example during Parry's tenure of it, and has been described as equivalent to the Groom of the Stool for male monarchs.

- 1558–1565: Kat Ashley
- 1565–c.1572: Blanche Parry (as Chief Gentlewoman of the Privy Chamber)
- by 1572: Catherine Howard, Countess of Nottingham

=== Anne of Denmark ===
- 1603–1617: Jane Drummond.
- 1617–1619: Elizabeth Grey, Lady Ruthin.

=== Henrietta Maria of France ===
- 1626–1652: Susan Feilding, Countess of Denbigh (also called mistress of the Robes and Groom of the Stool)

=== Catherine of Braganza ===
- 1660–1681: Barbara Howard, Countess of Suffolk
- 1681–1685: Isabella de Nassau, Countess of Arlington

=== Mary of Modena ===
- Lady Penelope O'Brien, Countess of Peterborough (also with title Groom of the Stool)
- 1688–1691: Elizabeth Herbert, Marchioness of Powis

== First ladies of the bedchamber to British queens and princesses of Wales ==
During the 17th and 18th centuries role often overlapped with or were retitled as Mistress of the Robes, until the latter role replaced it in the 1760s.

=== Anne, Queen of Great Britain ===
- dates unknown: Flower Backhouse

=== Caroline of Ansbach ===
- 1714–1717: Diana Beauclerk, Duchess of St Albans

=== Augusta of Saxe-Gotha ===
- dates unknown: Lady Jane Hamilton

== See also ==
- Première dame d'honneur, French equivalent
- Camarera mayor de Palacio, Spanish equivalent
