= Isabel Rich, Countess of Holland =

English courtier

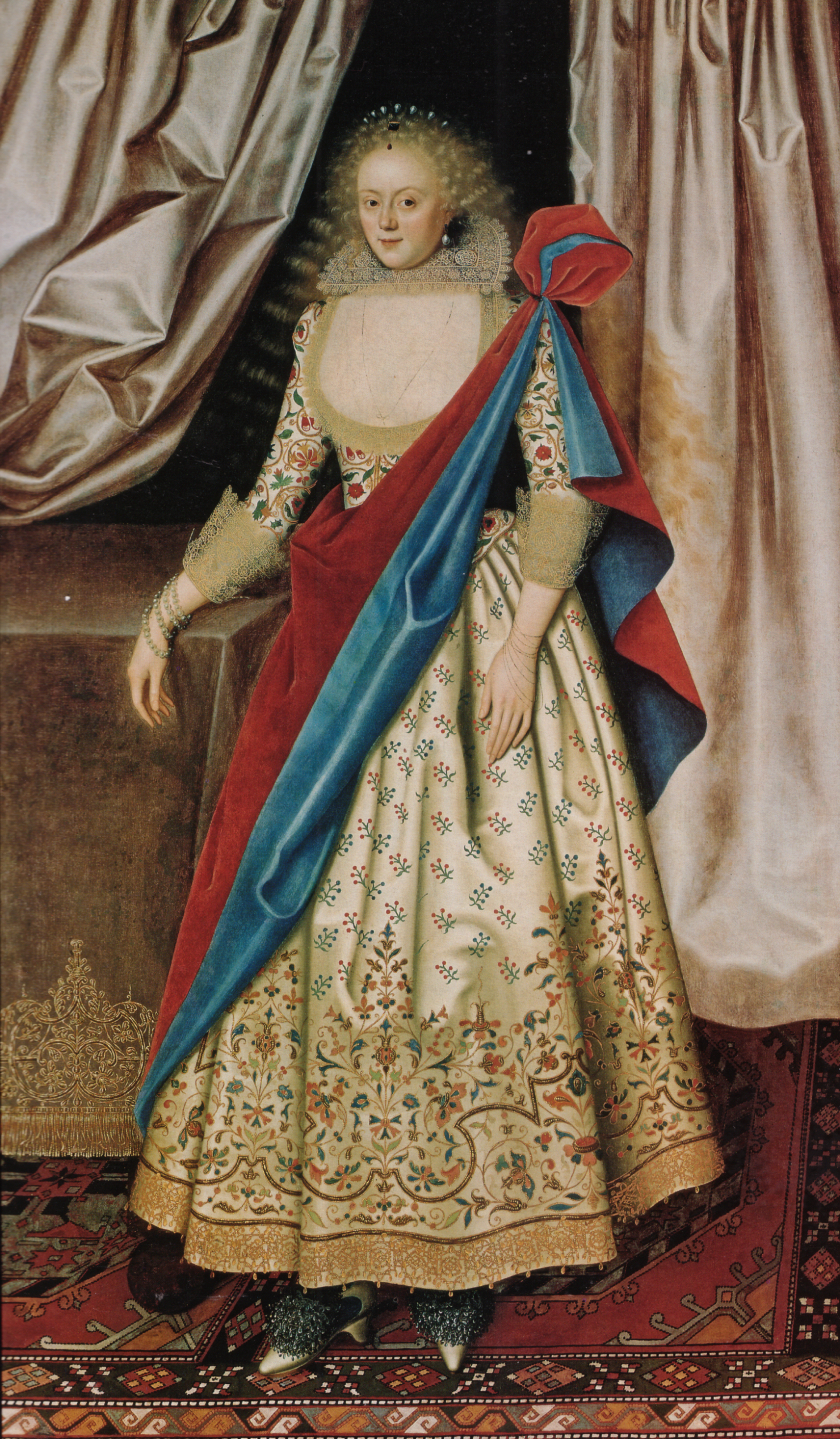
Lady Isabel Rich, née Cope

Isabel Rich, Countess of Holland (died August 1655), formerly Isabel Cope, was an English courtier. She was the wife of Henry Rich, 1st Earl of Holland.

Isabel Cope was the daughter of Sir Walter Cope (c. 1553–1614) and his wife, the former Dorothy Grenville (1563–1638).

In or before 1616, she married Rich, then a knight and MP for Leicester, thus obtaining the title Lady Rich. When her husband was granted an earldom in 1624, by King James I of England, she became Countess of Holland.

Their children, several of whom died in infancy, included:

- Lady Dorothy Rich (1616–1617);
- Lady Frances Rich (c.1617–1672), who married William Paget, 5th Baron Paget, and had children
- Robert Rich, 5th Earl of Warwick (c.1619–1675), who married twice: his first wife was Elizabeth, née Ingram, daughter of Sir Arthur Ingram; after her death, he married his second cousin Lady Anne Montagu, daughter of Edward Montagu, 2nd Earl of Manchester. There were children from both marriages.
- Lady Isabella Rich (born 1623), who married Sir James Thynne (d. 1670), by whom she had no issue;
- Lady Susannah Rich (c.1628–1649), who married James Howard, 3rd Earl of Suffolk, and had children and had surviving issue, one daughter Lady Essex Howard through whom the barony Howard de Walden passed to her descendant John Griffin Whitwell, 1st Baron Braybrooke in 1784
- Lady Diana Rich (d. 1658)
- Hon. Charles Rich (d. 1645)
- Hon. Henry Rich (d. 1669)
- Hon. Cope Rich (1635–1676), who had one child and was the grandfather of Edward Rich, 8th Earl of Warwick;
- Lady Mary Rich (c.1636–1666), who married John Campbell of Glenorchy, later Earl of Breadalbane and Holland, as his first wife, and had children.

The countess's portrait was painted by William Larkin around the time of her marriage, and is held at Kenwood House in the care of English Heritage.

Her husband, a Royalist, already in poor health, was executed in 1649.
