= Custos Rotulorum of Suffolk =

This is a list of people who have served as Custos Rotulorum of Suffolk in England.

- Sir Humphrey Wingfield bef. 1544–1545
- John Gosnold bef. 1547–1554
- Sir William Cordell bef. 1558 – bef. 1562
- Sir Clement Heigham bef. 1562–1571
- James Rivett bef. 1573 – aft. 1584
- Sir Robert Jermyn bef. 1594 – 1614
- Thomas Howard, 1st Earl of Suffolk bef. 1621–1624?
- Theophilus Howard, 2nd Earl of Suffolk 1624–1640
- James Howard, 3rd Earl of Suffolk 1640–1681

For later custodes rotulorum, see Lord Lieutenant of Suffolk.
