= Susanna Howard =

British aristocrat who was said to be an exemplar of a religious life

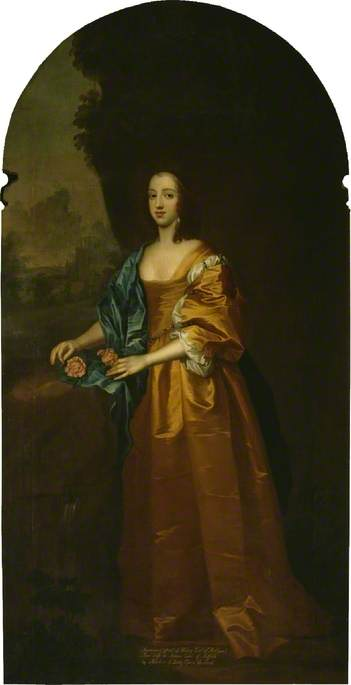
- Susanna Howard (née Rich), Countess of Suffolk by Enoch Seeman
- Born: 1627
- Died: 19 May 1649 (aged 21–22)

Susanna Howard, countess of Suffolk born Lady Susanna Rich (1627–1649) was an English aristocrat. She was known for being devout and as an example of a godly life.

== Life ==
Howard was born in the spring of 1627. Her parents were Isabel Rich, Countess of Holland (born Cope) and Henry Rich, 1st Earl of Holland. She showed talents for, and interest in, learning, poetry and religion. Her father probably knew poets from the court of Henrietta Maria and she had a remarkable memory. She was a particular admirer of George Herbert and his best known work "The Temple". Herbert was both a church of England minister and a poet and he was known as "Holy Mr Herbert". He was someone who had given up preferment to devote himself to God.

She would learn sections of the bible and it was said that she could recall a sermon she had heard almost word perfect. Every day she would use the notes of Giovanni Diodati to assist her in reading six chapters of the bible. She was said to always wear black and to not wear any adornment, although a portrait reveals that this was not always the case.

Howard went to live in Essex at the mansion of Audley End after she married James Howard, 3rd Earl of Suffolk on 1 December 1640 in Kensington. He had inherited a debt of £132,000 from the previous Earl and he married her, in part, to reduce that burden. Before they married, her husband had supported the king in a war against the Scots. After they married and as the civil war progressed he sided with Parliament and he attended the House of Lords. Their first child was named Essex Howard and she was followed by two sons, neither of whom survived infancy.

Her husband was arrested during the civil war and her father, Henry Rich, 1st Earl of Holland, was involving in leading a faction who intended to put Charles back on the throne. His force of 600 men was defeated and he was tried for treason by his peers. He was executed in March 1649. Howard developed an illness that affected her mind and she died on 19 May 1649, aged 22. She was buried at St Mary the Virgin church in Saffron Walden.
