= August Wolfstieg =

German librarian and Freemasonry researcher

August Wolfstieg (21 June 1859, Wolfenbüttel — 27 May 1922, Wolfenbüttel) was a German Geheimrat, chief librarian of the Abgeordnetenhaus of Berlin, and Freemasonry researcher.

In 1899, he was admitted in the Masonic Lodge Pythagoras zum flammenden Stern (Pythagoras to the Flaming Star) in Berlin.

He was also Reich Commissioner for Books and Libraries at the Paris Exposition Universelle in 1900 and at the Louisiana Purchase Exposition in 1904.

== Bibliography ==
- Bibliographie der freimaurerischen Literatur (3 vols, 1 supplement; 1911-1926)
- Ursprung und Entwicklung der Freimaurerei (3 vols; 1920)
- Das Baugewerbe in England und die Brüderschaft der Steinmetze (1920)
- Die geistigen, sittlichen und ästhetischen Werte der Freimaurerei (1922)
- Freimaurerische Arbeit und Symbolik (1922)
