= Mary Parker, Countess of Macclesfield =

Mary Frances Parker, Countess of Macclesfield (c.1761 – 1 January 1823), formerly Mary Drake, was the wife of George Parker, 4th Earl of Macclesfield.

Mary was the daughter of the Reverend Thomas Drake, rector of Amersham, who claimed descent from Sir Francis Drake; he died when she was in her teens. She married the earl, then an MP and heir to the earldom, on 24 (or 25) May 1780, while she was still technically a minor. Her sister, Sarah, married Augustus Pechell, a son of Sir Paul Pechell, 1st Baronet.

Parker succeeded to the earldom in 1795, whereupon his wife became a countess. They had one daughter, Lady Maria Parker (1781-1861), who married Thomas Hamilton, 9th Earl of Haddington, but had no children.

The countess was a Lady of the Bedchamber to Charlotte of Mecklenburg-Strelitz, queen consort of King George III of Great Britain, from 1801 until the queen's death in 1818.

She died at the family seat of Shirburn Castle, after a long illness.
