= Elizabeth Hervey, Countess of Bristol =

British court official and noble

The Right Honourable The Countess of Bristol
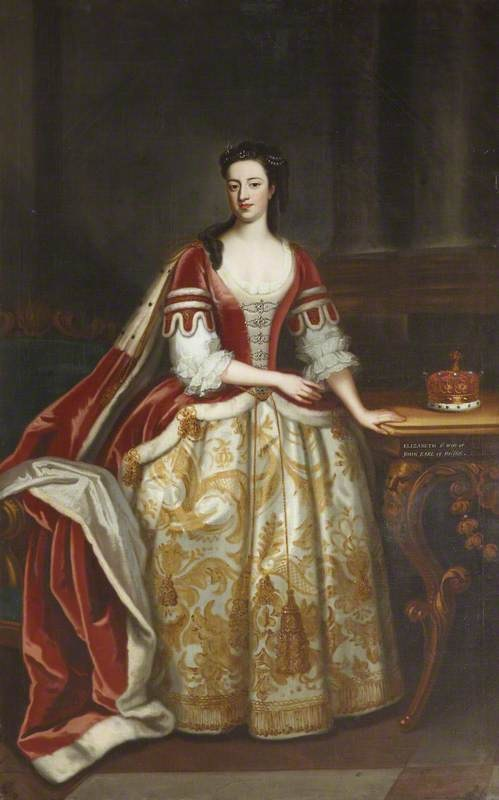
- Portrait of the Countess of Bristol, by Enoch Seeman, 1738
- Born: Elizabeth Felton; 18 December 1676
- Died: 1 May 1741 (aged 64)
- Resting place: St Mary's Church, Ickworth
- Spouse: John Hervey, 1st Earl of Bristol (m. 1695; died 1741)
- Children: 17
- Parent(s): Sir Thomas Felton, 4th Baronet; Lady Elizabeth Howard

Elizabeth Hervey, Countess of Bristol (18 December 1676 – 1 May 1741), was a British court official and noble, the second wife of John Hervey, 1st Earl of Bristol. They had seventeen children.

== Early life ==
She was the daughter of Sir Thomas Felton, 4th Baronet, and his wife, the former Lady Elizabeth Howard, one of the daughters and coheirs of James Howard, 3rd Earl of Suffolk, and Barbara Howard, Countess of Suffolk.

Her paternal grandparents were Sir Henry Felton, 2nd Baronet of Playford, Suffolk, and the former wife Susanna Tollemache, a daughter of Sir Lionel Tollemache, 2nd Baronet.

== Personal life ==
On 25 July 1695 Elizabeth married Hervey at Boxted Hall in Suffolk, and became Countess of Bristol when her husband acquired the earldom in October 1714. The countess was described by her friend, Lady Mary Wortley Montagu, as "young, blooming, coquette and gallant", and said that "resolved to make up for time misspent, she has two lovers at a time". The children of the marriage were:

- John Hervey, 2nd Baron Hervey (1696–1743), politician, court wit and pamphleteer
- Lady Elizabeth Hervey (1698–1727), married Hon. Bussy Mansel, and had no children
- Hon. Thomas Hervey (1699–1775), MP for Bury from 1733 to 1747; held various offices at court; he eloped with Elizabeth, wife of Sir Thomas Hanmer, 4th Baronet.
- Capt. Hon. William Hervey, RN (1699–1776), who married Elizabeth Ridge and had issue
- Rev. Hon. Henry Hervey (1701–1748), who married Catherine Aston, assumed her surname, and had issue
- Rev. Hon. Charles Hervey (1703–1783), a twin who became the prebendary of Ely
- Hon. Henrietta Hervey (1703–1712), a twin who died young
- A son (1704–1704), who was stillborn
- Hon. James Porter Hervey (1706–1706)
- Lady Anne Hervey (c. 1707–1771)
- Lady Barbara Hervey (c. 1707–1727)
- Hon. Humphrey Hervey (b. 1708), who died young
- Hon. Felton Hervey (1710–1710), who died young
- Hon. Felton Hervey (1712–1773), MP for the family borough of Bury St Edmunds.
- Hon. James Hervey (1713–1714), who died young
- Lady Louisa Carolina Isabella Hervey (1715–1770), who married Sir Robert Smyth, 2nd Baronet
- Lady Henrietta Hervey (1716–1732)

She became a Lady of the Bedchamber to the Princess of Wales and future queen, Caroline of Ansbach, in 1714, retaining the position until Caroline's death in 1737.

The countess died four years after the queen and was buried at St Mary's Church, Ickworth, a traditional resting place for the Hervey family.

=== Legacy ===
A portrait of the countess, by John Simon after Michael Dahl, is held by the National Portrait Gallery. She was also painted by Sir Godfrey Kneller.
