= Barbara Howard, Countess of Suffolk =

English courtier

The Right Honourable Barbara Howard, Countess of Suffolk
- Born: May/June 1622
- Died: 13 December 1680
- Noble family: Villiers; Howard
- Spouses: Hon. Richard Wenman; Sir Richard Wentworth; James Howard, 3rd Earl of Suffolk
- Issue: Lady Elizabeth Howard
- Father: Sir Edward Villiers
- Mother: Barbara St. John
- Occupation: First Lady of the Bedchamber to Queen Catherine

Barbara Howard, Countess of Suffolk (née Villiers; May/June 1622 – 13 December 1680), formerly Lady Wentworth, was an English courtier and the wife of James Howard, 3rd Earl of Suffolk. She served as First Lady of the Bedchamber for the queen of England, Catherine of Braganza, from 1660–81.

== Life ==
She was the daughter of Sir Edward Villiers, knt.. She married, first, Hon. Richard Wenman, the son of Viscount Wenman. Following Wenman's death in 1646, she married Sir Richard Wentworth. In about February 1650, she married her third husband, the Earl of Suffolk, as his second wife. During her third marriage she gave birth to her only child, a daughter, Lady Elizabeth Howard, who married Sir Thomas Felton, 4th Baronet, and was the mother of Elizabeth Hervey, Countess of Bristol. Barbara was the aunt of her namesake, Barbara Villiers, Duchess of Cleveland, mistress of King Charles II.

In 1662, she was appointed to the office of First Lady of the Bedchamber to the new queen, Catherine of Braganza, upon her arrival in England, while her niece, the king's mistress Barbara Villiers, was appointed one of the ladies of the Bedchamber. The Countess of Suffolk was also Groom of the Stole to the queen. Lord Northumberland wrote to Robert Sidney, 2nd Earl of Leicester: "My Lady of Suffolk is declared first lady of the bed-chamber to Her Majesty, at which the Duchess of Richmond and Countess of Portland, both pretenders to the office, are displeased."

There was no Mistress of the Robes appointed, and the office of First Lady of the Bedchamber was the highest-ranked of all the female officials of the queen, giving her precedence over the rest of the ladies-in-waiting. In a list from 1677, she ranked first among the women of the Household of the queen, followed by Charlotte Killigrew, Keeper of the Secret Coffers, the nine Ladies of the Bedchamber, the six Maids of Honour, the Mother of the Maids, and five Portuguese ladies-in-waiting.

Barbara Howard welcomed Catherine to the country as the senior of the five ladies-in-waiting present when the new queen arrived at Portsmouth, about which Lord Sandwich wrote: "The Queene, as soon as she came to her lodgings, received my lady Suffolk and the other ladies very kindly, and appointed them this morning to come and put her in that habit they thought would be most pleasing to the King; and I doubt not but when they shall have done their parts, she will appear to much more advantage and very well to the King's contentment."

She assisted the queen in changing her Portuguese style to an English way of dress and hairstyle, and discard the heavy hairstyle, farthingale and stomacher used in Portugal, which was considered outdated as a fashion from the Elizabethan age.

She later officiated during the wedding, ceremoniously undressing her after the wedding alongside her Portuguese ladies-in-waiting the Countess of Ponteval and the Countess of Penalva. She was a visible and public figure during her tenure, taking first place as lady-in-waiting at all public ceremonies, such as the official entry of Catherine to London. She stood godmother, with Charles II and the Earl of Oxford for godfathers, to Charles FitzRoy, 2nd Duke of Cleveland, the son of Barbara Palmer, 1st Duchess of Cleveland. She nursed the queen when she was sick after her childbirth. She kept her office until her death.
