= William Backhouse =

English philosopher

- Born: January 17, 1593
- Died: May 30, 1662 (aged 69)
- Education: Oxford
- Occupations: Philosopher, alchemist, astrologer, and translator

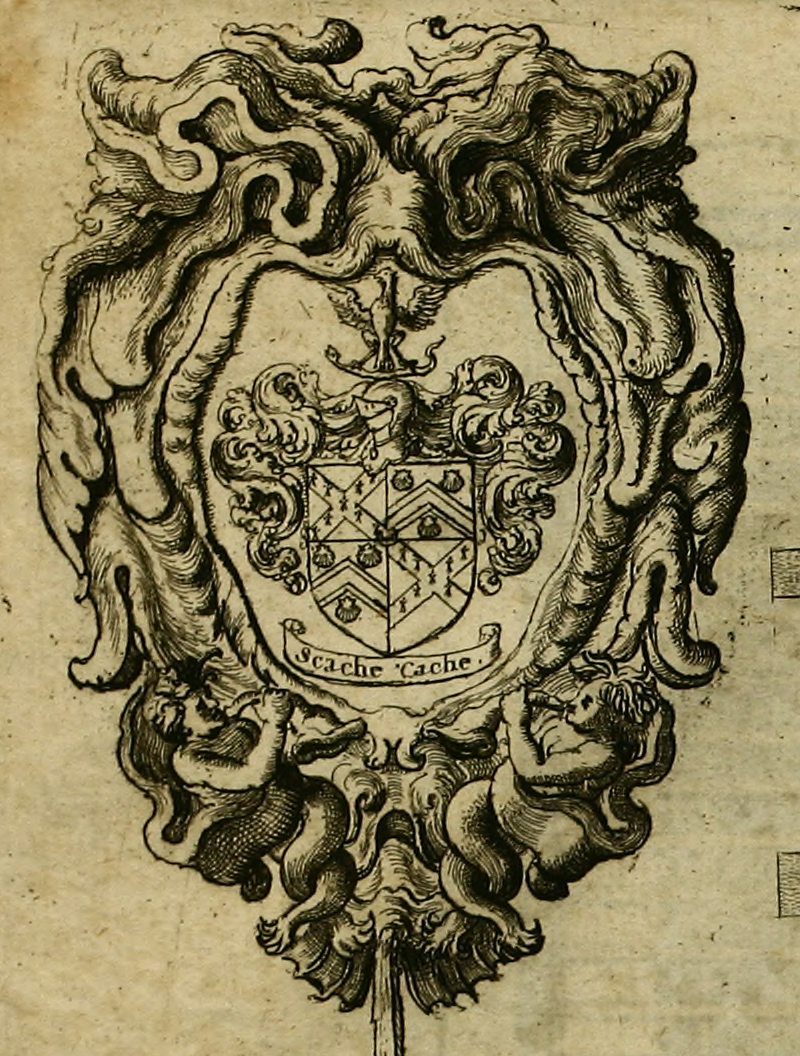
Coat of arms of William Backhouse, 1658. From William Dugdale's The History of St. Pauls Cathedral in London. Backhouse is celebrated as a benefactor of the cathedral in this book. Both the depicted motto, "scache cache" (in modern French: "sache cacher" or, in English: "know to hide"), and the crest of an eagle clutching a serpent, have a distinctly alchemical flavor. (Note: Backhouse's coat of arms, including the serpent and eagle, are the same as his grandfather, Nicholas', as recorded in Ashm. MS 858 (pp.185–6). The motto is likely William's own invention, as the same archaic French phrase appears in two of his French translations, The pleasant Founteine of Knowledge and A Treatise of ye Phillosophers stone, and it is unlikely a merchant family, such as the Backhouses, would have any use for such a secretive motto.)

William Backhouse (17 January 1593 – 30 May 1662) was an English philosopher, alchemist, astrologer, translator, and the esoteric mentor of Elias Ashmole.

Born into the wealthy Backhouse family, Backhouse enjoyed an education at Oxford, and was likely exposed to alchemical teachings and the Rosicrucian manifestos of the 1610s. He married Anne Richards in 1637/8, and had three children. By 1651, he had become the mentor of Elias Ashmole, taking him as his "spiritual son and heir", the role for which his is best remembered. The following exchange of alchemical knowledge and manuscripts has been described as having an effect on Ashmole that "cannot be overstated". This relationship flourished in an intense exchange of alchemical documents and information, unaffected by Backhouse's poor health and fear of identification in Ashmole's publications. Backhouse, predeceased by all his siblings and children, but one, died in 1662, leaving all his possessions to his daughter, Flower Backhouse, the last of the Backhouse family.

Only so much can be understood about Backhouse, by virtue of his distaste for the public eye (per his motto) and devotion to esoteric knowledge. But the few contemporary sources that remain give a picture of Backhouse that shows him to be a "respected figure in a network of people involved in occult and philosophical studies" according to Jennifer Speake; a "most renown'd chymist, Rosicrucian, and a great encourager of those that studied chymistry and astrology" according to Anthony à Wood; and a "quiet, secretive man of an inventive mind [...] combining a gift for languages with a graceful poetic vein" according to C. H. Josten.

== Biography ==
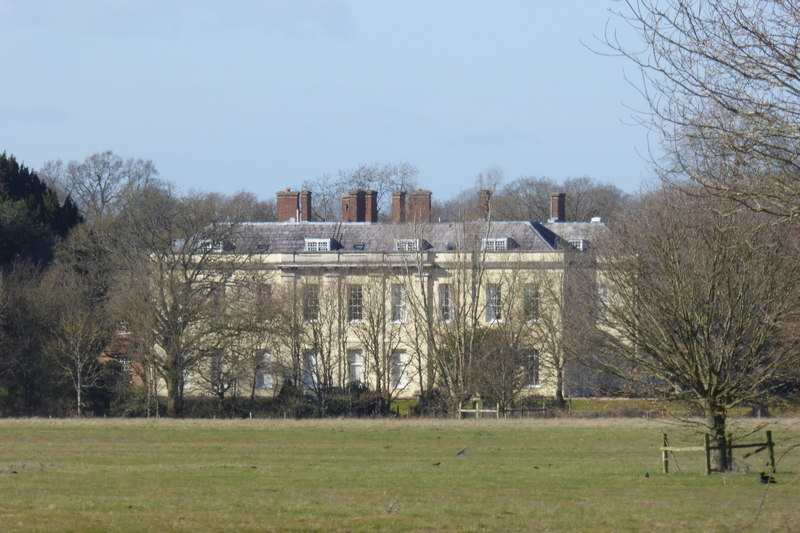
Swallowfield Park, the Backhouse family estate and home of William Backhouse for all of his life.

William Backhouse was born into the Lancashire Backhouse family. The earliest recorded member of this family is a Thomas Backhouse of Cumberland. His son, the wealthy London merchant Nicholas (William's grandfather), was granted a coat of arms in 1574. This grant makes note that Backhouses "lange tyme past did come out of Lancashere where they were of worshippful degree & did beare these tokens of honor". Indeed, from 1557 to 1580, Nicholas was Sheriff and Alderman of London. William's father and Nicholas' son, Samuel Backhouse (1532–1626) had a similar social standing; he was High Sheriff of Berkshire in 1598 and 1601, met Elizabeth I in 1601, and became the member for Windsor from 1604 to 1611, and Aylesbury in 1614. In 1582, Samuel purchased the family estate of Swallowfield. Though little can be known of his interests, Samuel Backhouse may have had some alchemical knowledge or connections, as a "Sir S. Backus" (likely Samuel, being that he was the only contemporary Backhouse with an "S" name) is credited with the decipherment of a Dutch Cipher in an Ashmolean MSS, associating him with prominent alchemists, Cornelis Drebbel and Edward Dyer.

William Backhouse was born on 17 January 1593 to Samuel and Elisabeth Backhouse (née Borlase), the youngest of four sons and three daughters. Little can be said of Backhouse's early life. He was probably born in Swallowfield, where his father was High Sheriff, and enjoyed a comfortable life, with his father's success. In 1901, genealogist Lady Russell claimed to have found a "curious MS" written from Reading mathematician John Blagrave to a young Backhouse in 1610, concerning astrology, which Russell speculates may have influenced Backhouse's later interests. Later biographer, C. H. Josten, has been unable to locate this MS, though he considers such an association "possible".

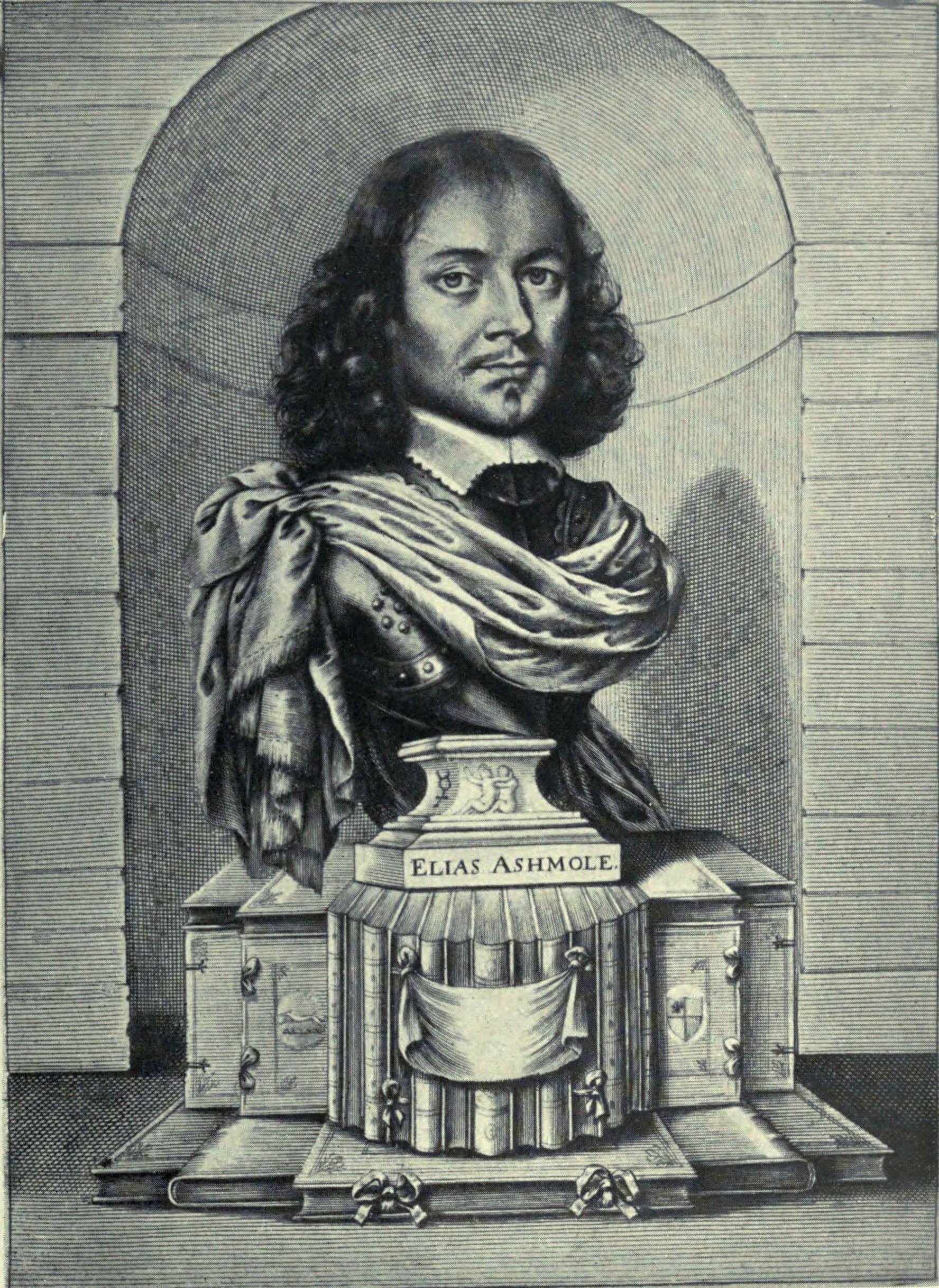
Elias Ashmole, 1656, by William Faithorne. William Backhouse is best remembered today for his mentorship of Elias Ashmole from 1651 to 1662.

In 1610, Backhouse entered Christ Church, Oxford, though he left without taking a degree. C. H. Josten has speculated that Backhouse associated with the prominent Rosicrucian Robert Fludd (who had become a member of the college in 1605), though there is no hard evidence to support such an association. Further, Mordechai Feingold has speculated Backhouse formed a bond with Robert Payne over their common Berkshire heritage, college, and scientific interests. No evidence has survived of their association during this period, but circumstantial evidence corroborates the statement and they were certainly good friends in later life; Payne staying in Backhouse's Swallowfield estate after his 1648 ejection from Oxford during the parliamentary visitation, and continuing to pay visits long after.

Little can be said of Backhouse in the period from 1611 to 1633, beyond family events of public record. Backhouse's father died in 1626, his lands inherited by Sir John Backhouse, William's elder brother; Backhouse's mother died in 1630. Both have monuments in Swallowfield Church. Josten has suggested he acquainted himself with the Rosicrucian manifestos of the 1610s, and that he perhaps travelled around Europe, as was popular among gentlemen around his age (these travels possibly evidenced by his later French translations). Anthony à Wood asserts Backhouse was "a great Rosy Crucian", perhaps working off of a testament of Ashmole, though Josten has doubted he was a member of any real Rosicrucian fraternity. In December 1633, Backhouse composed an alchemical poem, The Magistery, (Note: The poem appears in Ashmole's anthology under the indeterminate signature of "W.B.", though Ashmole's own copy of the anthology contains Backhouse's full surname appended to the initials, eradicating any doubt of the authorship.) which was later to appear in Elias Ashmole's 1652 alchemical anthology, Theatrum Chemicum Britannicum. This is the earliest hard evidence of Backhouse's alchemical preoccupation. The poem is steeped in alchemical symbolism and, according to Josten, draws widely from alchemical works, indicating deep study of these concepts. According to Wood, in 1536, Backhouse received some private papers of Nicholas Hill from his widow, concerning various philosophical topics.

In 1637 or 1638, Backhouse married Anne Richards (daughter of a Brian Richards). Their first child, Samuel, died young; their second, John, was born on 6 November 1640 and was healthier than his sibling, but did not outlive his father; their third, Flower lived on to become Backhouse's sole heir, and the last of his line. Flower and John were tutored by bishop William Lloyd, who lived to become a family friend and consecrated one of Flower's weddings. In 1649, when Backhouse was age 56, he inherited the estate of Swallowfield, all three of his elder brothers having died.

Yo^{r} Son! 'Tis soe! for I begin to finde,
Your Auncestors large thoughts grow in my minde:
I feele y^{t} noble Blood spring in my Heart,
Which does intytle me to some small parte
Of grand sire Hermes wealth; & hope to have
Interest in all the Legacies he gave,
To his successive children; from whoome too
I must derive what is confer'd by you.

— Elias Ashmole, To my worthily honour'd William Backhouse Esqr Upon his adopting of me to be his son.

By 1651, Backhouse had become the mentor of English antiquary Elias Ashmole. It is not clear at which date they first became acquainted, but Ashmole records, in a diary entry of April 1651, that "M^{r} Will: Backhouse of Swallowfield in Com., Berks. caused me to call him Father thenceforward." This diary entry is Ashmole's earliest mention of Backhouse, but such an intimate connection between the two would suggest they had known each other for some time before this point. In 1644, Ashmole had first begun his interest in astrology and, by the 1650s, Ashmole devoted much of his time towards the study of alchemy, and collection of alchemical MSS. By 1648, Ashmole had become lord of the manor at Bradfield, which happened to be in the immediate neighbourhood of Backhouse's Swallowfield. The following relationship has been described by C. H. Josten as having an effect on Ashmole that "cannot be overrated".

Whatever date they met, Backhouse and Ashmole enjoyed a valuable mentorship in this period. Ashmole, so overjoyed by this adoption, composed a dithyrambic ode (an excerpt of which is printed, left) upon the occasion. C. H. Josten has interpreted this ode as signifying Ashmole's link, through Backhouse, to "a long chain of alchemical ancestry, who, from Hermes onwards, transmitted their secrets only by oral tradition to their spiritual sons". This "hermetic adoption" allowed Ashmole to learn of Backhouse's esoteric secrets. Backhouse took Ashmole into the acquaintances of chemists Lord Ruthven (25 April) and John Goodyer (9 October), while engaging in an intense exchange of alchemical MSS.

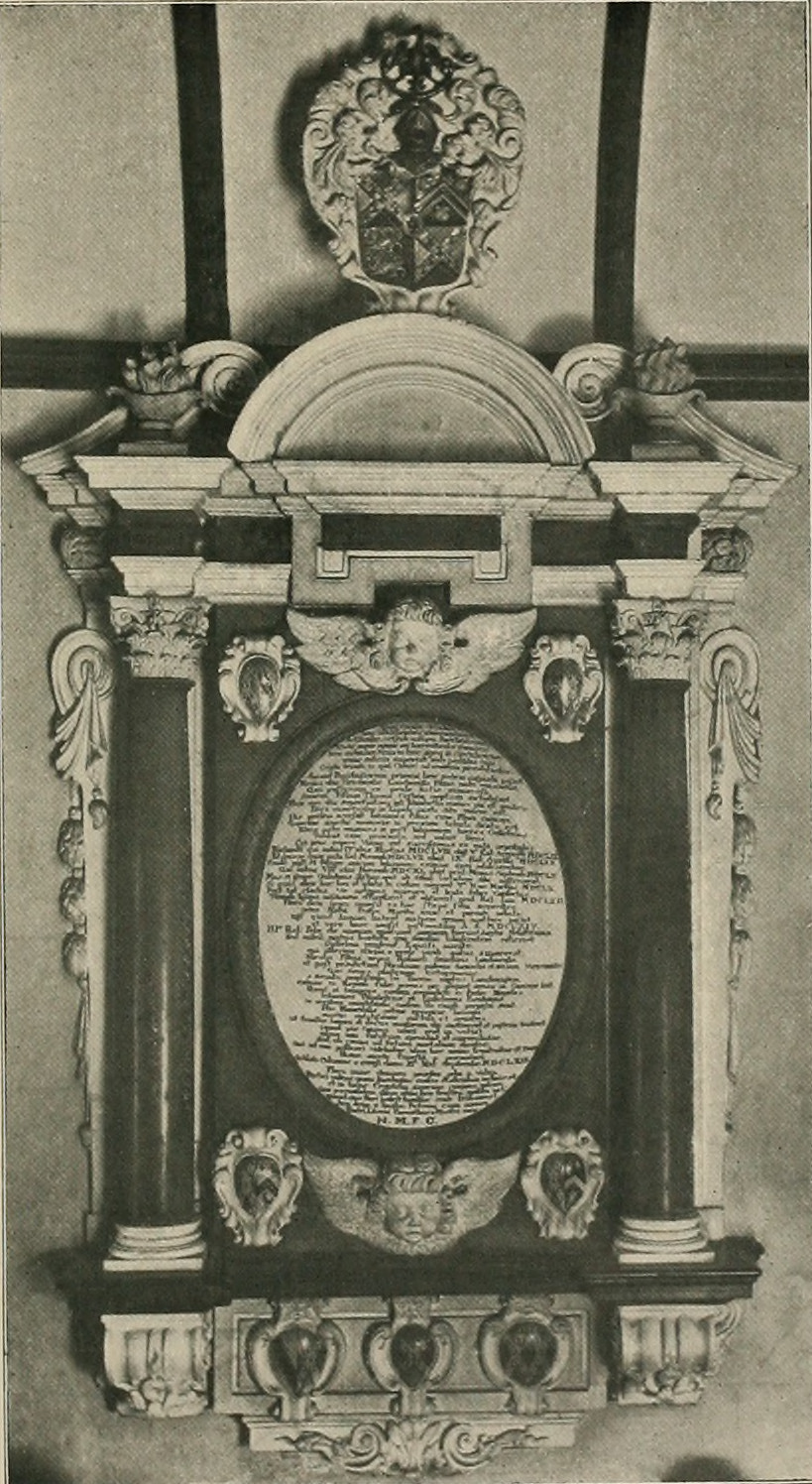
The Backhouse family monument in All Saints' parish church, Swallowfield. Erected by Flower Backhouse in 1670, to the memory of all the Backhouses who had resided in Swallowfield.

On 13 May 1653, Ashmole records in his diary that Backhouse was "lying sick in Fleetestreete over at: S^{t} Dunstans Church, & not knowing whether he should live or dye". Faced with his mortality, Ashmole records that Backhouse was motivated to reveal to him "in Silables the true Matter of the Philosophers Stone", as his "Legacy" if he should die. There is no hard evidence to suggest Ashmole ever passed on this secret to anyone else, but F. Sherwood Taylor has speculated that, later in Ashmole's life, he passed on the secret to Robert Plot. Taylor bases this on some circumstantial evidence of Plot's association with Ashmole and his attribution of some secrets to "our English Anonymus", possibly referring to Backhouse. Backhouse soon recovered from this illness, and their intense exchange continued undiminished.

Despite Ashmole's close companionship with him, Ashmole never mentioned Backhouse explicitly in any published writings, the only written record of their friendship existing in personal MSS and handwritten marginal notes in his books. Josten has speculated this was because of a request of Backhouse's not to be mentioned by name; exemplifying his broadly secretive nature, Backhouse never held public office (unlike his forefathers) and published nothing under his name, though he has been identified as the author of the aforementioned The Magistery, several English translations of French alchemical works, and, in an unfounded German assertion, The Way to Bliss. (Note: The Way to Bliss was an alchemical work first printed by Ashmole. It was first attributed to Backhouse in an anonymous Rosicrucian bibliography published in the Journal von und für Deutschland (1785, pp. 274–5), and uncritically reproduced by Georg Kloss (Bibliographie der Freimaurerei, 1844) and August Wolfstieg (Bibliographie der freimaurerischen Literatur, Vol. 2, 1923). This assertion lacks any corroborating evidence and Josten has declared it to be "unfounded".)

As a wealthy and well-read man, Backhouse's interests extended beyond alchemy. Ashmole records the many 'old deedes' in his possession, and John Aubrey, a strange curative visitation to ancient buildings, suggesting an antiquarian interest. In a 1653 astrological almanacl, Hemeroscopeion, which George Wharton dedicates to Backhouse, he is referred to as a master of astrology. He also appears to have been a keen inventor, with Samuel Hartlib recording Backhouse's "long Gallery wherin are all manner of Inventions and Rarities", describing him as a "favourer of all manner of ingenuities", and recalling an anecdote, wherein Backhouse exhibited a thermometer for King Charles I, much to his delight. Backhouse is also credited by Wood as "the inventor of the Way wiser, in the time of George Villiers", a device for measuring distances in coaches, though the device appears to have been described earlier by Vitruvius.

In 1660, Backhouse's son-in-law, William Bishop, died, without issue (his two children having died in 1659); six months later, Backhouse's only son, John, died at age 20, with no heirs either. Soon after, Backhouse made his will, appointing Flower as his sole executor. In 1611, he left lands of Hurst, Sindlesham, and Arborfield to Jesus College, to be maintained by two fellows able to understand and speak Welsh. The final entries of Ashmole's diary mentioning Backhouse record his death, aged 69, on 30 May 1662, having suffered from a wasting fever, and his burial in Swallowfield Church on 17 June. The Backhouse family monument records he had fulfilled his mission of life, and departed wearily. (Note: The Latin text reads "Post tot clades, vir optimus moerore et lenta febre confectus vivendo lassus, missionem efflagitavit et obtinuit prid[em]".) Swallowfield and Backhouse's possessions fell into the hands of Flower, as his sole heir and the final member of the Backhouse family.

== Translations ==
Aside from his poem, The Magistery, Backhouse produced no original works which can be undoubtedly attributed to him. Instead, the majority of his surviving written works consist of manuscript translations of French alchemical works, now housed in the Ashmolean. These translations are listed by Josten (1949, pp. 27–33) as follows:

- The pleasant Founteine of Knowledge, First written in French Ano 1413, by John de la Fonteine of Valencia in Henault, & translated 1644 (translated from La Fontaine des Amoureux de Science by Jean de la Fontaine; Ashm. MS 58, pp. 1–23)
- Planctus Naturae: The Complaint of Nature against y^{e} erronious Alchymist, by John de Mehung (translated from Les Remontrances de Nature à l'Alchimiste errant by Jean de Meun; Ashm. MS 58, pp. 27–48)
- The Alchymists Answere to Nature (translated from La Réponse de l'Alchimiste à Nature by Jean de Meun; Ashm. MS 58, pp. 50–67)
- A Treatise of y^{e} Phillosophers stone wrighten by Synesius y^{e} Greeke Abbot, taken out of y^{e} library of y^{e} Emperor (translated from Le Vray Livre De La Pierre Philosophale du docte Synesius, Abbé Grec, tiré de la Bibliotheque de l'Empereur, no Greek original of this text has been found; Ashm. MS 58, pp. 72–88)
- The Golden Fleece or The Flowre of Treasures, in w^{ch} is succinctly & methodically handled, the Stone of y^{e} Philosophers, his excellent effecte & admirable Vertues; and the better to attaine to the Originall & true meanes of Perfection Inriched with Figures representing the proper Colours to lyfe as they successively appere in the Practise of this Blessed worke. By that greate Philosopher Solomon Trismosin Master to Paracelsus (translated from La Toyson d'Or by Salomon Trismosin; Ashm. MS 1395, pp. 1–223)
