= James Howard, 3rd Earl of Suffolk =

British Earl (1619–1688)

- Born: 10 February 1606/07
- Died: December 1688 (aged 81–82)
- Spouse(s): Susannah Rich (m. 1640; died 1649) Barbara Villiers (m. 1650; died 1681) Anne Montagu
- Children: 2
- Father: Theophilus Howard
- Relatives: Henry Howard (brother); George Howard (brother); Frances Villiers (sister)

James Howard, 3rd Earl of Suffolk, KB (10 February 1606/07 – December 1688), and 3rd Baron Howard de Walden (1619–1688), eldest son of Theophilus Howard, 2nd Earl of Suffolk. Howard was honoured with knighthood in the Order of the Bath in 1626, and was a joint-commissioner of the parliament to Charles I the same year. He supported the Royalist cause in the English Civil War, and was a courtier after the Restoration of the monarchy in 1660. He was lord-lieutenant of Suffolk and Cambridgeshire and gentleman of the bedchamber, 1660–1682.

== Biography ==
At the coronation of Charles I on 2 February 1626 Howard was created K.B., and in February 1639, as Lord Walden, became leader of a troop of volunteer horse for the king's army.

On 3 June 1640 Howard succeeded his father, Theophilus as the 3rd Earl of Suffolk, and on the 16th of the same month was sworn joint lord-lieutenant of Suffolk. The parliament nominated him lord-lieutenant of that county on 28 February 1642. On 28 December 1643 he received a summons to attend the king's Parliament at Oxford, and on 7 July 1646 was appointed joint commissioner from the parliament to the king at Newcastle.

Acting on a report from the Committee of Safety, in September 1647, the commons decided, but went no further, to impeach Howard, together with six other peers, of high treason. On 8 September 1653 Howard was sworn as high steward of Ipswich.

After the Restoration Howard became lord-lieutenant of Suffolk, and of Cambridgeshire on 25 July 1660. From 18 to 24 April 1661 he acted as Earl Marshal of England for the coronation of Charles II. In the same year he became colonel of the Suffolk Militia Horse. On 28 September 1663 he was created M.A. of Oxford, and M.A. of Cambridge on 6 September 1664. He was also appointed governor of Landguard Fort, Essex, gentleman of the bedchamber to the king on 4 March 1665, and keeper of the king's house at Audley End, Essex, in March 1667. He commanded the Suffolk Militia during the Battle of Landguard Fort on 2 July 1667. He was appointed joint commissioner for the office of Earl Marshal of England on 15 June 1673, colonel commandant of three regiments of Cambridgeshire Militia in 1678, and was hereditary visitor of Magdalene College, Cambridge. In March 1681 he was discharged from the lord-lieutenancy of Suffolk and Cambridgeshire, and from attendance in the king's bedchamber

Howard died in December 1688, and was buried on 16 January 1689 at Saffron Walden, Essex. On his death the earldom passed to his brother George (died 1691). The barony Howard de Walden fell into abeyance for nearly a century, until it was called out of abeyance for a descendant of his elder daughter Lady Essex Howard, later Baroness Griffin.

== Family ==
On 1 December 1640 (later in the same year that he became 3rd Earl of Suffolk) Howard married Lady Susannah Rich (died 15 May 1649), daughter of Henry Rich, 1st Earl of Holland, and with her had a daughter Essex.

In about February 1650, Howard married for a second time, Barbara (died 13 December 1681), daughter of Sir Edward Villiers, and widow of Richard Wenman and latterly Sir Richard Wentworth. The second Lady Suffolk died on 13 December 1681, leaving a mutual daughter, his second child, Lady Elizabeth Howard, groom of the stool to the queen.

After December 1681 and before 8 May 1682 Howard married Anne (died October 1720), eldest daughter of Robert Montagu, 3rd Earl of Manchester, with whom he had no children.

== Audley End ==
Howard inherited the Audley End estate in north-west Essex from his father. The estate was heavily encumbered, and, in 1666, he sold Audley End House and park to King Charles II, while retaining the rest of the estate. He remained living in the house as 'Keeper of the King's House at Audley End'. In 1687 he made a settlement which stipulated that his daughters' descendants should inherit the estate if there were no male heirs of himself and his brothers. This turned out to be the case, and, following the death of the 10th earl of Suffolk in 1747 and a case in the Court of Chancery, the estate was divided between Elizabeth Wallop, Countess of Portsmouth and her sister Ann Whitwell (granddaughters of Howard's daughter Essex) and Lord Hervey (great-grandson of Howard's daughter Elizabeth). Audley End House and park were excluded from the award, as they had been in the possession of the king in when the settlement was made in 1687, but were purchased by the Countess of Portsmouth in 1751 from her kinsman Thomas Howard, 2nd Earl of Effingham.

== Bibliography ==
- This article incorporates text from a publication now in the public domain: Goodwin, Gordon (1891). "Howard, James (1619–1688)". In Lee, Sidney (ed.). Dictionary of National Biography. Vol. 28. London: Smith, Elder & Co. pp. 40–41..
- Frank Hussey, Suffolk Invasion: The Dutch Attack on Landguard Fort, 1667, Lavenham: Terence Dalton, 1983; Landguard Fort Trust reprint 2005, ISBN 0-86138-027-4.

Political offices
Preceded by The Earl of Suffolk	Lord Lieutenant of Suffolk; 1640 – 1642; With: Sir Thomas Jermyn	English Interregnum
Preceded by The Earl of Suffolk	Custos Rotulorum of Suffolk; 1640 – 1642	English Interregnum
Preceded by The Earl of Arundel and Surrey	Earl Marshal; 1661 – 1662	Succeeded by In Commission
Honorary titles
English Interregnum	Lord Lieutenant of Cambridgeshire; 1660 – 1681	Succeeded by The Lord Alington
English Interregnum	Lord Lieutenant and Custos Rotulorum of Suffolk; 1660 – 1681	Succeeded by The Earl of Arlington
Peerage of England
Preceded by Theophilus Howard	Earl of Suffolk; 1640 – 1688	Succeeded by George Howard
Preceded by Theophilus Howard	Baron Howard de Walden; 1640 – 1688	Succeeded by John Griffin Whitwell
