= Sir Charles Barrington, 5th Baronet =

English Tory politician

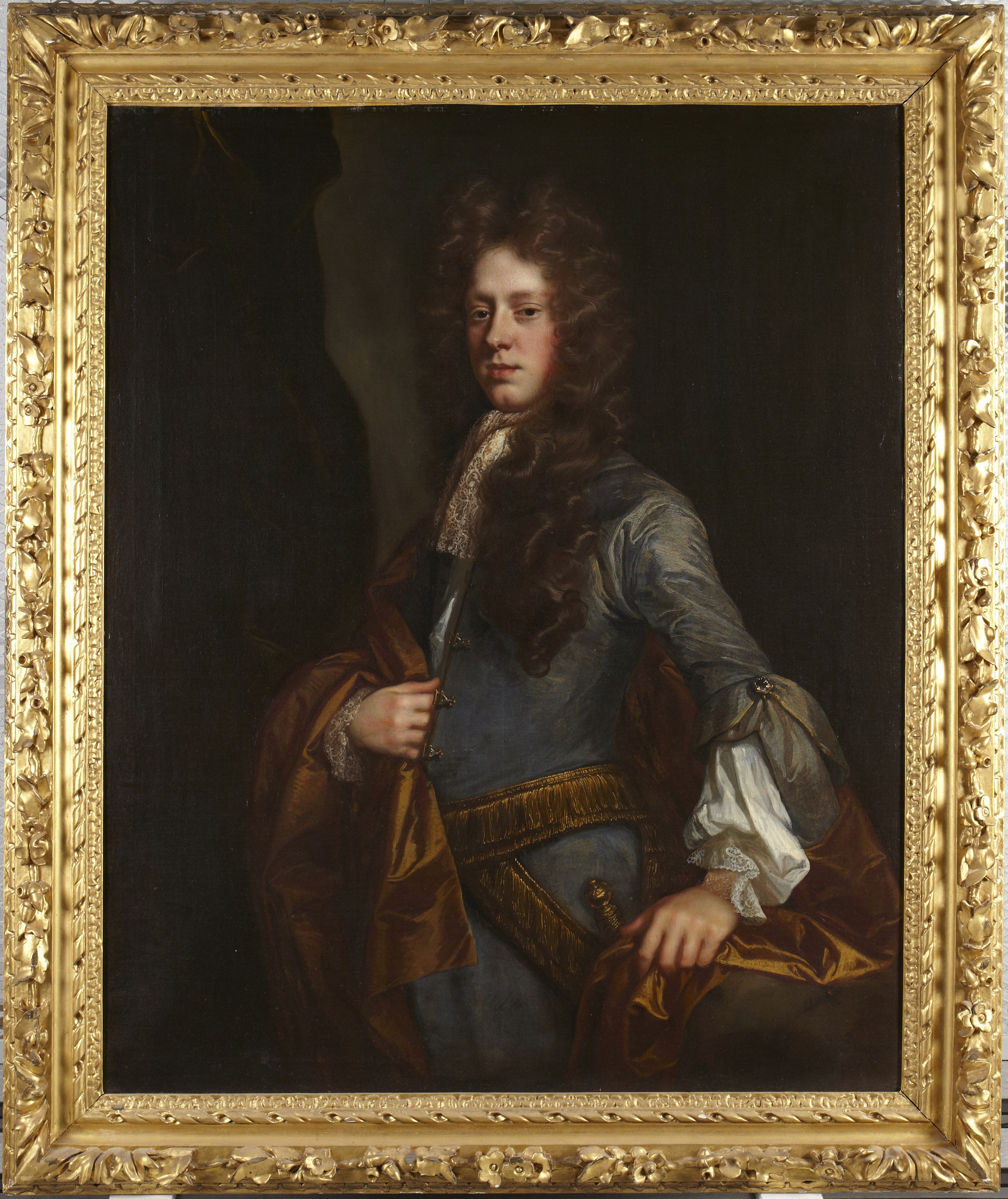
Sir Charles Barrington

Sir Charles Barrington, 5th Baronet (ca. 1671 – 29 January 1715) was an English Tory politician.

== Background and education ==
He was the second son of Thomas Barrington and his wife Lady Anne Rich, daughter of Robert Rich, 3rd Earl of Warwick. His father was the first son of Sir John Barrington, 3rd Baronet but had died before Sir John. Barrington was educated at Felsted School. He succeeded his older brother John, who had died from smallpox aged only 21, as baronet in 1691.

== Career ==
Barrington entered the English House of Commons in 1694, sitting for Essex until 1705. He represented the constituency again in the Parliament of Great Britain from 1713 until his death two years later. In 1702, Barrington was appointed Vice-Admiral of Essex, a post he held until 1705 and later again from 1712 for another two years. He was a freeman of Maldon, Essex and served as the town's alderman and bailiff.

== Family and death ==
Shales's Name Act 1735
- Act of Parliament
- Parliament of Great Britain
- Long title: An Act to enable John Shales, commonly called John Barrington, and the Heirs of his Body, to take and use the Surname of Barrington, pursuant to a Settlement made by Sir Charles Barrington Baronet, deceased.
- Citation: 9 Geo. 2. c. 24 Pr.
- Territorial extent: Great Britain

Dates
- Royal assent: 5 May 1736
- Commencement: 15 January 1736 (Note: Start of session.)

Status: Current legislation

On 20 April 1693, he married firstly Bridget Monson, daughter of Sir John Monson, 2nd Baronet, at St Bride's Church in London. She died in 1699 and Barrington remarried Hon. Anna Marie FitzWilliam, daughter of William FitzWilliam, 1st Earl FitzWilliam on 23 May 1700. He died childless and was succeeded in the baronetcy by his cousin John Shales, who changed his surname to Barrington as a condition of the inheritance, and this was achieved by a private act of Parliament, Shales's Name Act 1735 (9 Geo. 2. c. 24 Pr.). Barrington was buried at Hatfield Broad Oak in Essex.

== Notes ==
Parliament of England
Preceded by John Lamotte Honywood; Sir Francis Masham	Member of Parliament for Essex; 1694–1705; With: Sir Francis Masham 1694–1698; Edward Bullock 1698–1701; Sir Francis Masham 1701–1705	Succeeded by Lord Howard de Walden; Sir Francis Masham
Parliament of Great Britain
Preceded by Thomas Middleton; Sir Richard Child	Member of Parliament for Essex; 1713 – 1715; With: Sir Richard Child	Succeeded by Thomas Middleton; Sir Richard Child
Honorary titles
Preceded by Sir Isaac Rebow	Vice-Admiral of Essex; 1702–1705	Succeeded by The Earl Rivers
Preceded by The Earl Rivers	Vice-Admiral of Essex; 1712–1714	Succeeded by Thomas Middleton
Baronetage of England
Preceded by John Barrington	Baronet (of Barrington Hall); 1691–1715	Succeeded by John Barrington
