= Henry Howard, 6th Earl of Suffolk =

English nobleman

Member of Parliament for Essex
- In office 1705-1706

Member of Parliament for Arundel
- In office January - February 1694; 1695-1698

Personal details
- Born: 1670 London, England
- Died: 19 September 1718 (aged 47–48)
- Spouse(s): Auberie O'Brien (m. 1691; died 1703) Henrietta Somerset (m. 1705)
- Children: 5, including Charles
- Parent: Henry Howard (father)
- Education: Magdalene College, Cambridge

Henry Howard, 6th Earl of Suffolk, 1st Earl of Bindon PC (1670 – 19 September 1718) was an English nobleman, styled Lord Walden from 1691 to 1706.

== Biography ==
Howard was born in London, the son of Henry Howard, 5th Earl of Suffolk. He was admitted to Magdalene College, Cambridge, in 1685. He stood for election as Member of Parliament for Arundel in January 1694 in the Tory interest with the support of his kinsman Henry Howard, 7th Duke of Norfolk. When he polled the same number of seats as John Cooke, the Whig candidate, the casting vote was given in his favour, but his election was overturned on petition in February. He was again returned for Arundel in 1695, holding the seat until 1698. From 1697 to 1707, he was Commissary-General of the Musters. In 1705, he was returned for Essex, but left the House of Commons when he was created Earl of Bindon in 1706. He was the Deputy Earl Marshal in England from 1706 to 1718. In 1708, he was appointed to the Privy Council.

In 1709, he succeeded his father as Earl of Suffolk. In 1715, he was appointed Lord Lieutenant of Essex and First Lord of Trade, offices he held until his death in 1718.

Howard married his first wife, Lady Auberie Anne Penelope O'Brien, daughter of Henry O'Brien, 7th Earl of Thomond, on 6 September 1691. She died in November 1703. They had four sons and one daughter. In April 1705, he married his second wife, Lady Henrietta Somerset, daughter of Henry Somerset, 1st Duke of Beaufort and widow of Henry Horatio O'Brien, Lord O'Brien. They had no children. He was succeeded in the earldoms and in his Lord-Lieutenancy by Charles William, his eldest surviving son.

Parliament of England
Preceded by William Morley; James Butler	Member of Parliament for Arundel; 1694; With: James Butler	Succeeded by James Butler; John Cooke
Preceded by James Butler; John Cooke	Member of Parliament for Arundel; 1695–1698; With: Edmund Dummer	Succeeded by John Cooke; Christopher Knight
Preceded by Sir Charles Barrington; Sir Francis Masham	Member of Parliament for Essex; 1705–1706; With: Sir Francis Masham	Succeeded by Sir Francis Masham; Thomas Middleton
Political offices
Preceded by The Earl of Carlisle	Deputy Earl Marshal; 1706–1718	Succeeded by The Earl of Berkshire
Preceded by The Lord Berkeley	First Lord of Trade; 1715–1718	Succeeded by The Earl of Holderness
Honorary titles
Preceded by The Viscount Bolingbroke	Lord Lieutenant of Essex; 1715–1718	Succeeded by The Earl of Suffolk
Peerage of England
Preceded by Henry Howard	Earl of Suffolk; 1709–1718	Succeeded by Charles Howard
New creation	Earl of Bindon; 1706–1718	Succeeded by Charles Howard
