= Henrietta Howard, Countess of Suffolk (died 1715) =

English nobility (1669–1715)

Henrietta Howard Countess of Suffolk
- Born: 1669
- Died: 10 August 1715 (aged 45–46); Audley End House, Essex
- Burial place: Howard family vault, Saffron Walden, Essex
- Other names: Lady Henrietta Somerset
- Spouses: Henry Horatio O'Brien, Lord Ibrackan (m. 1686; died 1690) Henry Howard, 6th Earl of Suffolk (m. 1705)
- Children: Mary O'Brien; Henry O'Brien, 8th Earl of Thomond
- Parents: Henry Somerset, 1st Duke of Beaufort (father); Mary Capell (mother)

Henrietta Howard, Countess of Suffolk (c.1669 – 10 August 1715), formerly Lady Henrietta Somerset, was the second wife of Henry Howard, 6th Earl of Suffolk.

Lady Henrietta Somerset was the daughter of Henry Somerset, 1st Duke of Beaufort, and his wife, the former Mary Capell.

On 24 June 1686, Lady Henrietta married Henry Horatio O'Brien, son of the Earl of Thomond, who had inherited the courtesy title "Lord Ibrackan" from his elder half-brother in 1678. They had two children:

- Mary O'Brien (died 1716), who died unmarried.
- Henry O'Brien, 8th Earl of Thomond (1688–1741)

Her son Henry inherited the titles of his grandfather, Henry O'Brien, 7th Earl of Thomond.

Lord Ibrackan died of smallpox in 1690. In April 1705, his widow married Henry Howard, MP, whose wife, Lady Auberie Anne Penelope O'Brien, daughter of the 7th Earl of Thomond (and sister of Henrietta's first husband), had died in November 1703, leaving him with four sons and a daughter. Henry Howard, then heir to the earldom of Suffolk, was created 1st Earl of Bindon at the end of 1706, making his wife a countess. He became Earl of Suffolk in 1709.

In 1706, Henry Howard's youngest brother, Charles, married his sister-in-law's namesake, Henrietta Hobart, the ward of Henry and Charles's father, the 5th Earl of Suffolk. This other Henrietta would become notorious as a royal mistress.

Henrietta and her second husband had no children. On his death in 1718, he was succeeded in the earldom and in his Lord-Lieutenancy by Charles William, his eldest surviving son from his first marriage.

Henrietta died at Audley End, Essex, and was buried in the Howard family vault at Saffron Walden.
