= James Butler (1680–1741) =

James Butler (1680 – 17 May 1741), was a British politician who sat in the House of Commons at various times between 1705 and 1741.

Butler was the son of James Butler of Amberley Castle and his wife Grace Caldecott, daughter of Richard Caldecott of Hawkhurst, Kent. His father, who had been MP for Arundel died in 1696. He was probably admitted at Trinity Hall, Cambridge in 1698. He married Elizabeth Bennet, widow of Sir Richard Bennet, 3rd Baronet and daughter of Sir Charles Caesar of Bennington, Hertfordshire on 31 January 1704. He bought the estate of Warminghurst in 1792 or 1707, from William Penn.

A Whig supporter, he returned as Member of Parliament for Arundel at the 1705 general election but did not stand in 1708. He was elected MP for Sussex at the 1715 general election but did not stand in 1722. However he returned as MP for Sussex at a by-election on 22 February 1728 and retained the seat during the elections of 1734 and 1741.

Butler died of smallpox aged 61 on 17 May 1741, ten days after his re-election. His only son John was also an MP.

Parliament of Great Britain
Preceded by Edmund Dummer; Carew Weekes	Member of Parliament for Arundel; 1705–1708; With: Edmund Dummer	Succeeded by Sir Henry Peachey, Bt; The Viscount Shannon
Preceded by Henry Campion; John Fuller	Member of Parliament for Sussex; 1715 – 1722; With: Hon. Spencer Compton	Succeeded by Hon. Henry Pelham; Hon. Spencer Compton
Preceded by Hon. Henry Pelham; Hon. Spencer Compton	Member of Parliament for Sussex; 1728–1741; With: Hon. Henry Pelham	Succeeded by Hon. Henry Pelham; Earl of Middlesex
