= James Butler (1651–1696) =

English politician

James Butler (1651–1696) was an English politician. He was Member of Parliament for Arundel from 1679 to 1685 and 1690. Butler was a member of the wealthy Butler family who were influential figures in the county of Sussex. Butler himself was from Amberley, West Sussex.

Parliament of England
Preceded by The Earl of Orrery; The Lord Aungier of Longford	Member of Parliament for Arundel; 1679–1685; With: William Garway	Succeeded by William Garway; William Westbrooke
Preceded by William Garway; William Morley	Member of Parliament for Arundel; 1690–1695; With: William Morley 1690–1694; Lord Walden 1694; John Cooke 1694–1695	Succeeded by Lord Walden; Edmund Dummer
