= Edmund Dummer (naval engineer) =

English naval engineer and shipbuilder

Surveyor of the Navy
- In office 1692–1699
- Preceded by: John Tippetts
- Succeeded by: Daniel Furzer

Member of the English Parliament for Arundel
- In office 1695–1698 Serving with Lord Henry Howard
- Preceded by: John Cooke; James Butler
- Succeeded by: John Cooke; Christopher Knight

Member of the English Parliament for Arundel
- In office January 1701 – November 1701 Serving with John Cooke
- Preceded by: Christopher Knight
- Succeeded by: Carew Weekes

Member of the English Parliament for Arundel
- In office 1702–1708 Serving with: Carew Weekes (1702–1705); James Butler (1705–1707)
- Preceded by: John Cooke
- Succeeded by: Parliament of Great Britain

Member of the Great Britain Parliament for Arundel
- In office 1707–1708 Serving with James Butler
- Preceded by: Parliament of England
- Succeeded by: Sir Henry Peachey, Bt; The Viscount Shannon

Personal details
- Born: 1651
- Died: April 1713 (aged 61–62) Fleet Prison, London, England
- Resting place: St Andrew's, Holborn
- Occupation: Naval engineer, shipbuilder, politician

Edmund Dummer (1651–1713) was an English naval engineer and shipbuilder who, as Surveyor of the Navy, designed and supervised the construction of the Royal Navy dockyard at Devonport, Plymouth and designed the extension of that at Portsmouth. His survey of 18 south coast ports is a valuable and well-known historic document. He also served Arundel as Member of Parliament for approximately ten years and founded the first packet service between Falmouth, Cornwall and the West Indies. He died a bankrupt in the Fleet debtors' prison.

In her account of Dummer, Celina Fox sums up his career thus:

Using elements of mathematical calculation and meticulously honed standards of empirical observation, Dummer tried to introduce a more rational, planned approach to the task of building ships and dockyards, with the help of his extraordinary draughting skills. Operating on the margins of what was technically possible, meeting with opposition from vested interests and traditional work patterns, he struggled to succeed. Today he is little recognized outside the circle of naval historians and his grandest building projects were almost wholly destroyed by later dockyard developments or bombing.

== Early career ==
Dummer was baptised on 28 August 1651 at St. Nicolas' Church, North Stoneham, Hampshire, the eldest of four sons born to Thomas Dummer (1626–1710), gentleman farmer of Chickenhall, in the parish of North Stoneham near Southampton, and his wife, Joanne Newman. He joined the Royal Navy in 1668 and served his apprenticeship as a shipwright under Sir John Tippetts at Portsmouth naval dockyard. In his 1686 account of the state of the Navy, Samuel Pepys wrote that when Dummer was apprenticed to Tippetts, he was "mostly employed as his clerk in writing and drawing". By 1678, Dummer was employed as an "extra clerk" in the office of the Surveyor, "my patron and friend from my youth upward". His job was to make designs for a variety of projects – lanthorns, wet docks, lodgings at Sheerness, ships' sterns – as well as to draught ships' lines.

In 1677, Dummer and Tippetts assisted Sir Anthony Deane, who had been appointed Controller of the Victualling Accounts on the Navy Board, and given the responsibility for establishing for the first time standardised sets of dimensions of ships of the line to be applied to the "thirty new ships", the largest single shipbuilding programme hitherto undertaken. For his work on establishing the new standards, Dummer was "singled out by the Navy Board for his extraordinary ingenuity to lay down the bodies of all the thirty new ships".

Several of Dummer's draughts from this period survive including a sketch-book Tables of Proportions of Ships, which comprises a series of engraved sheets of squared paper on which are plotted the curves or sweeps of the hulls of one second rate and some of the third rate ships newly built in the Thames and Medway yards. A volume of eight Dummer drawings entitled Draught of the Body of an English Man of War is in the Pepys Library; these are much more elaborate, doubtless intended to show off his extraordinary skills as a draughtsman to potential patrons, and include vertical sections through the ships showing the design and layout of the structure. These works constitute the earliest surviving example of Dummer's skills as a draughtsman, demonstrating a capacity to express an organised tectonic sensibility that was to mark his progress towards the surveyorship.

In February 1679, Dummer became caught up in a political dispute involving Pepys and Deane, who had been accused of leaking naval intelligence to France. Amongst the charges laid against Pepys and Deane by Parliament were that "they had employed a man to take the bodies of the king's ships, supposed to be no good intention". Dummer, "being extremely fearful myself what ill use might be made of me, or of the works so innocently meant" was taken before the King "to prevent (if in him it lay) by the King's approbation and allowance any reflection upon them that were already distressed". Dummer was sent to Bristol until January 1680 when he was summoned to attend the Navy Board with his draughts. There he met Deane who had been released from prison though not yet discharged; Deane asked Dummer to make two draughts for him, a promise Dummer failed to keep, having been instructed by the Navy Board not to do so.

The Admiralty still appeared to have suspicions about the loyalty of both Dummer and Deane, and at a meeting of the Lords Commissioners it was ordered "that I did not at the same time draw draughts for any other and as well as that of the King's service, and ordered they should give me a written order ... and also to report what was fitting to allow me to draught ...". By April 1680, Dummer had delivered five draughts; he wrote to the Navy Board to ask "whether I can be supposed to draw new draughts by that way I have practised". In May he was still asking whether the Board wanted to discharge or continue employing him, warning of his impending ruin: "I could have borne the present with more respect and patience, were I not able to say it hath been always my misfortune, that the greatness of the enterprise was never truly valued nor encouraged". Although the order to pay him at the rate of £7 per draught was made by the Admiralty to the Navy Board on 24 February and again on 11 May 1680 (with the proviso, "to take care before the payment of any of the said sums to the said Mr Dummer, that the work be so performed as may answer the end for which the said draughts were at first designed") he was still waiting for payment on 11 June.

== 1682 voyage to the Mediterranean ==
In July 1682, Dummer (now officially Master Carpenter on HMS Windsor Castle) was commissioned as a midshipman-extraordinary on HMS Woolwich and sent to the Mediterranean "in order to his collecting what useful observations should arise to him, in his enquiries through the several foreign ports there, relating either to the said art of ship-building, or the nature and order of the said ports, appearances of land, or ought else than might conduce to our service". Dummer had estimated that his expenses for about two years would be £95 4s 0d and it was agreed he was to be reimbursed for that sum by the Treasurer of the Navy.

On 3 August 1682, Dummer set out from Deal on the Woolwich, under the command of Captain William Holding, taking the Moorish Ambassador, who had been in England for six months, back to Tangier. Despite an attempted mutiny by the Ambassador's Moorish retainers while the ship was at anchor in Plymouth Sound, the Woolwich reached Tangiers on 31 August. After a change in command to Lieutenant Rigby (Holding had died and was buried at Tangiers), they sailed on east into the Mediterranean, south of Sardinia and Sicily, across the Ionian Sea to Cephalonia and Zante, then back through the Strait of Messina past the active volcano of Stromboli to Naples and Livorno, where Dummer disembarked, while the Woolwich started back to England on 24 November.

Dummer records that he then divided his time between Livorno and Pisa until 11 February 1683, when he received an answer from the Commissioners of the Admiralty "to whom I had given an account of my leaving the ship, and the reasons" for requesting extended shore leave. During this period, Dummer delivered to Sir Thomas Dereham, the English envoy in Florence, a magnificent panel carved by Grinling Gibbons celebrating the fruits of peace and friendship between princes, which was commissioned by Charles II as a gift for Cosimo III de' Medici, Grand Duke of Tuscany.

Dummer took a keen interest in recording towns, their dockyards and fortifications throughout the Mediterranean, making detailed perspectives and measured plans, producing a visual record of the arsenals of Naples, Livorno, Pisa, Venice, Genoa, Toulon, Marseille, Gibraltar and Cádiz. In contrast to the English method of building and repairing ships in dry dock, the Mediterranean ports used covered slipways of which Dummer made many drawings. He was particularly impressed by the Venetian Arsenal, drawing it in plan, general and detailed perspective, including A Perspective of the Mode of laying up small Ordnance and A Perspective of Two Arches ... under which Ships & Gallies are Built & Repaired.

By April 1683, he was in Toulon where he took the opportunity to carry out a little informal espionage: "They with much readiness permit you to go aboard their ships, but it is in such regularity, as not to be done but by a note, under the hand of a special officer". Amongst the 50 or more vessels in the harbour was the Royal Louis and two more first-rate vessels. Dummer described the fleet as a "good fleet, but in appearance ill built, or through some weakness in long living have generally put their wales a little straight in the midships". He described the Royal Louis as "a great ship and glorious in her first carving, no doubt; but to my judgment not of good proportion, nor good workmanship, her figure under water I know not, nor is that above to be admired".

Dummer reported that in Toulon, "all ships great & small are built on launches, and are careened when their occasions require it; for here are no docks, an obligation we are not tied to". He also made drawings of the new fortifications then under construction to the designs of Vauban.

On 14 April 1683, he arrived at Marseille the home of the French King's galleys, of which there were 35 in the harbour. He described the galleys as "the most polite and beautiful I ever saw".

During the voyage, Dummer diligently carried out the King's orders to make "observations upon all foreign shipping", from Cádiz to Constantinople. His journal described each vessel, both large and small, in great detail accompanied by both watercolour views and three-dimensional skeleton models.

In July 1683 Dummer sailed homewards from Livorno in the Swallow via the Balearic Islands, Málaga, Alicante, Gibraltar and Cádiz, where on 13 September he received orders to attend Lord Dartmouth in Tangier and stay until the English garrison was given up and destroyed, on 6 February 1684. Dummer returned to England accompanied by Samuel Pepys who had been in Tangier assisting Lord Dartmouth with the evacuation and abandonment of the British colony; they travelled back through Spain, arriving back in England after a particularly rough passage on 30 March 1684. By the end of the year his expenses, which amounted to £150 10s 6d – 50% more than his initial estimate – had been reimbursed.

On the completion of the voyage, Dummer produced a "sumptuous volume" which is now in the British Library.

== Chatham ==
While completing the fair copy of his journal, Dummer applied for positions as shipwright based in part on the strength of his skills as a draughtsman. In September 1685, on the recommendation of Pepys (now Secretary to the Admiralty Board), Dummer visited John Evelyn in Deptford. Evelyn was "so charmed with his ingenuity", he wrote to Pepys, "that I look on it as a new obligation to you; and if you find I cultivate it for my own sake a little; you will let him understand ... how much I wish him the improvement of your favours ..." In December, following the death of Thomas Shish, the Master Shipwright at Woolwich, Dummer applied for the vacant posts of Assistant Shipwright at Deptford and Chatham; he was supported in his application by John Evelyn, who described him as "a diligent and most ingenious man", adding "in my life I have never observed a young man ... less pragmatical, and of greater modesty, beside his so humble, cheerful and becoming dedication of himself to his patron alone, which is a mark of his discretion, as well as of his duty".

Thus in 1686, Dummer replaced Daniel Furzer (who was moved to become Master Shipwright at Sheerness) as First Assistant Master Shipwright at Chatham, under Robert Lee (the new Master Shipwright there), retaining this post until 1689. Writing at the time, Pepys considered Dummer "an ingenious young man, but said rarely to have handled a tool in his life, nor knows judiciously how to convert a piece of timber; has been much abroad indeed, but gained his present promotion upon the credit only of his designing and making of draught".

== Surveyor of the Navy ==
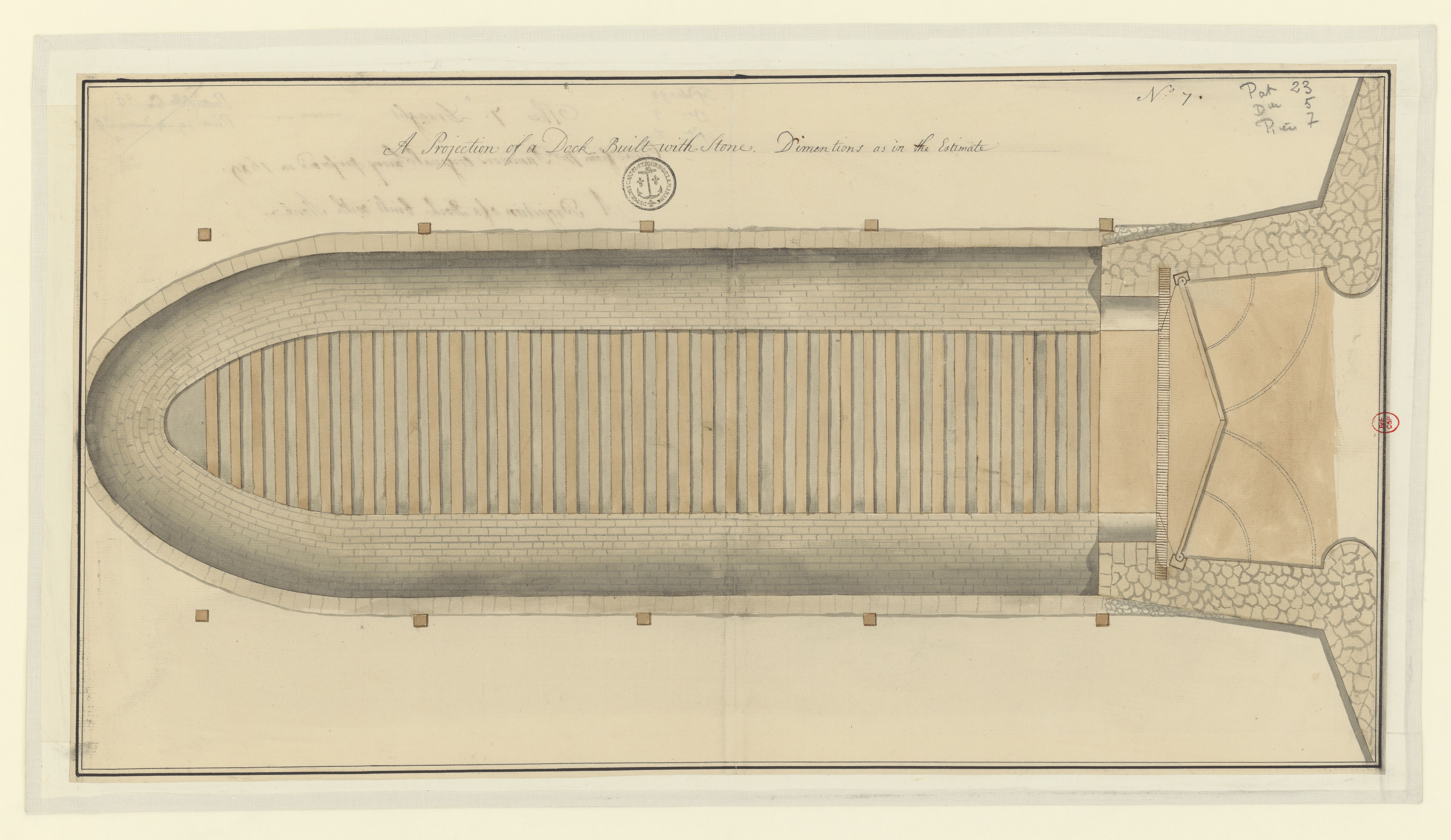
A Projection of a Dock Built with Stone: 1689 drawing by Edmund Dummer.

On 20 April 1689 Dummer was appointed Assistant Surveyor of the Navy (under Sir John Tippetts) with a salary of £300 a year; on the death of Tippetts in August 1692, he succeeded him as Surveyor on 9 August at £500 a year, retaining the post until 22 September 1699.

As Surveyor, Dummer endeavoured to strengthen the Navy by extending the measure of uniformity in ship construction initiated by the thirty new ships project. Despite the Navy's desire for standardisation, even the thirty new ships differed in size and tonnage, as shipwrights took the dimensions specified as being minimum rather than absolute measures. To end these disparities, in 1692 Dummer wrote to the men appointed to survey and measure the ships then under construction, enclosing a small printed sketch, with measurement points keyed into letters, "to serve for one common rule of direction and information, whereby the parts necessary to be truly measure[d] and known are at one view made intelligible to every man alike: and the numbers to be set down are to respect the letters in the manner following ..." His method of measurement was adopted as official practice in April 1696.

Dummer was the first surveyor who introduced exact standards for the construction of new vessels, sending each builder with his warrant for building a new ship the precise measurements together with models of the completed vessel. "Mr Dummer caused every master builder, at docking a ship, to measure the body and compare the figure".

In January 1693, following instructions by the Admiralty Board to report on the subject of bomb vessels, Dummer wrote to his old master Robert Lee at Chatham and to Fisher Harding at Deptford, asking them to check the proportions of a bomb-vessel designed by "a French engineer (Jean Fournier) who contrived those bomb vessels I saw when I was at Toulon". On the basis of their views, an experimental and rather unsatisfactory class of bomb vessels was built to English dimensions and rigging in 1693. A smaller, cheaper and more effective class followed two years later, built to mercantile dimensions in merchant yards.

In 1699, Dummer reported to the Admiralty on Thomas Savery's patent designs for a system of paddle-wheels driven by a capstan – following Dummer's negative report, the idea was dismissed by the Admiralty.

Dummer's main achievement as Surveyor was his development of the royal dockyards at Devonport near Plymouth and at Portsmouth.

=== Devonport ===
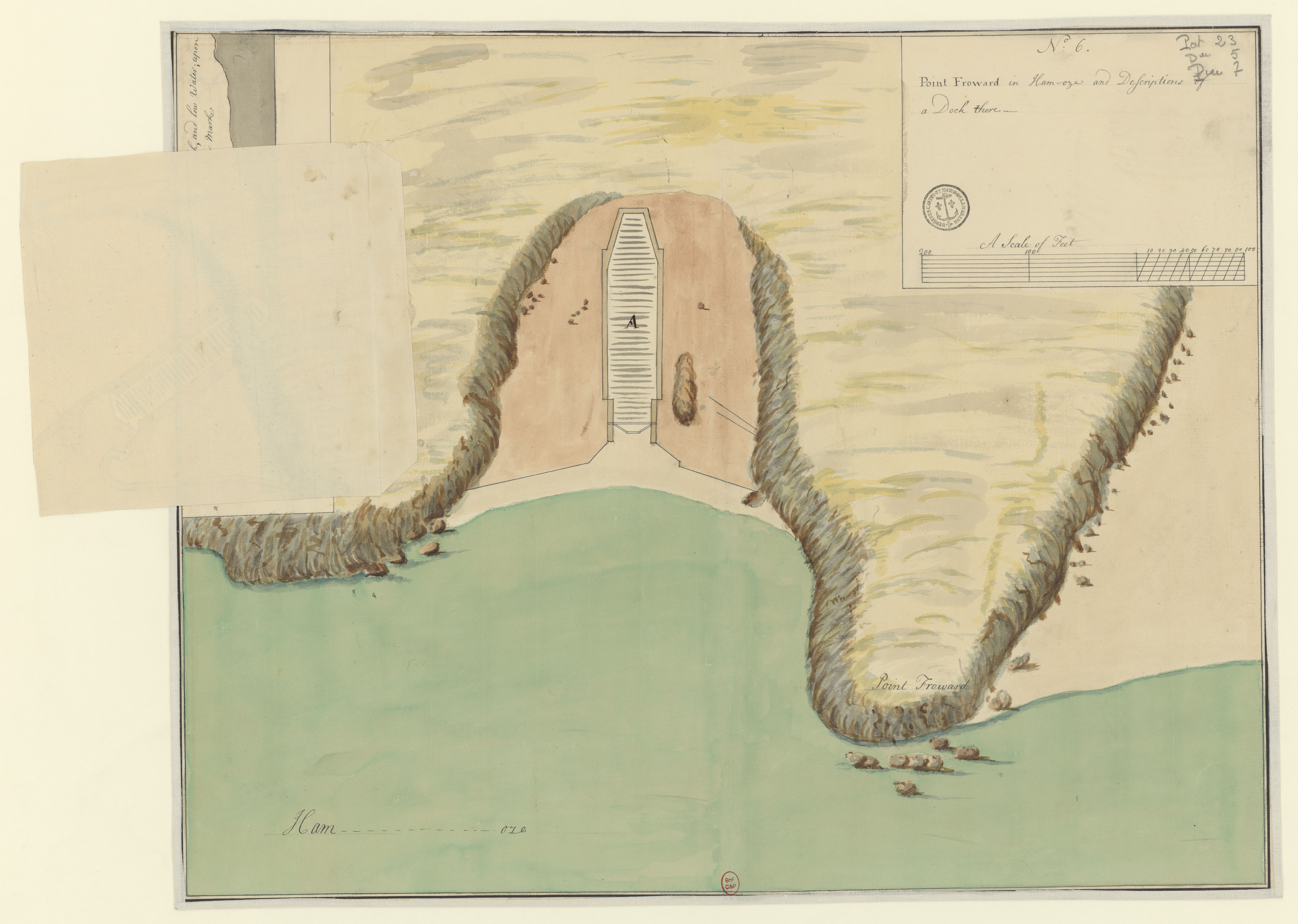
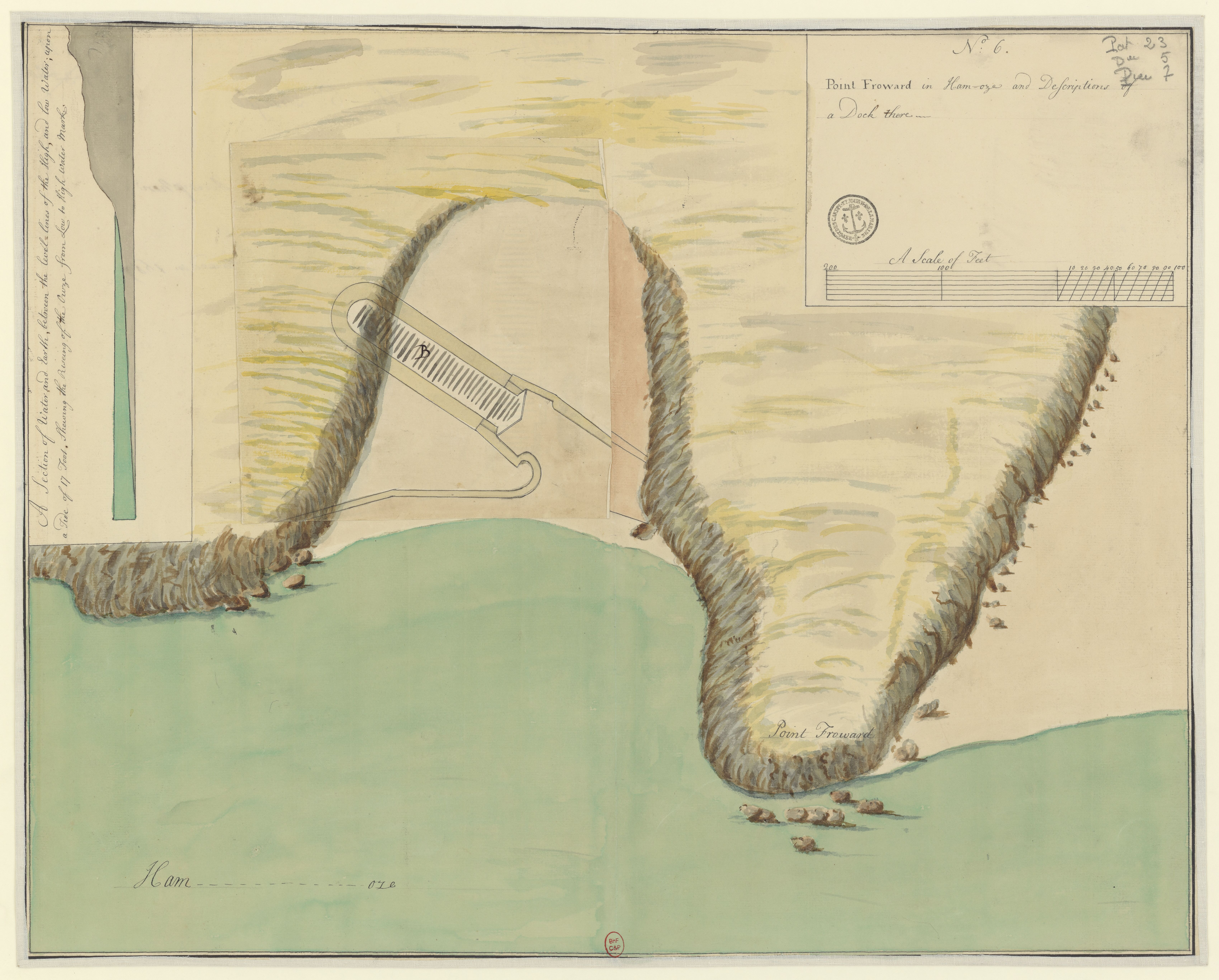
Two alternative early designs for a single dock at 'Ham-oze' (1689).

In September 1689, shortly after his appointment as Assistant Surveyor he was ordered to report on the most suitable site for a single dry dock at Plymouth. He returned to London in November with details of three possible locations, including sites at Cattewater and Hamoaze, which is a section of the River Tamar, in the parish of Stoke Damerel, including estimates of the cost of building on each site, both in timber and stone. After some debate, the small inlet at Hamoaze was selected; the work was to be done in stone with a protective wet dock in front and, at the insistence of King Willam, the dry dock was made large enough to hold first-rate ships. At Devonport, Dummer was the designer of the first successful stepped stone dry dock in Europe.

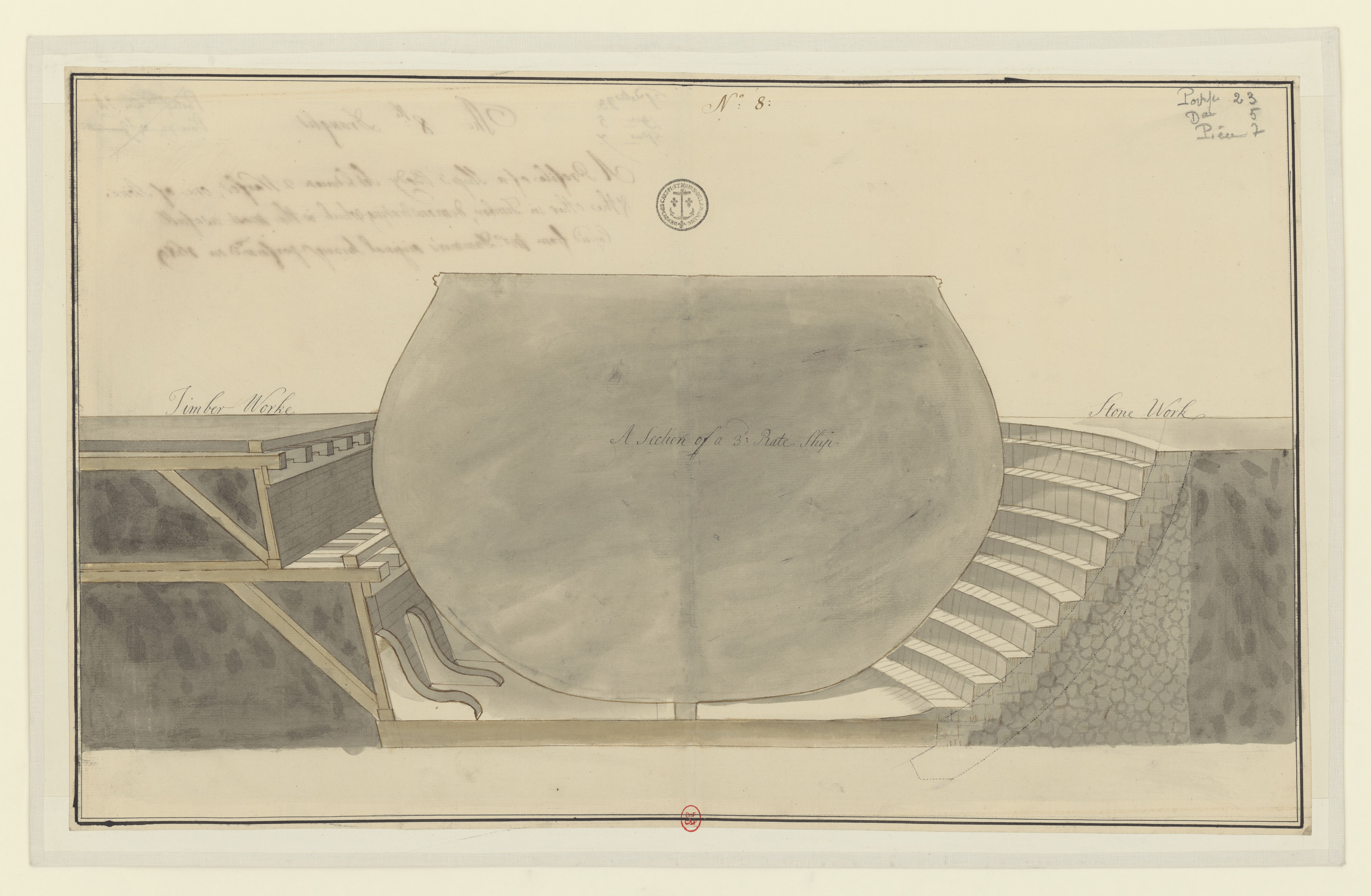
1689 drawing by Dummer, comparing the profiles of a wooden (left) and stone (right) dock.

Previously the Navy Board had relied upon timber as the major building material, which resulted in high maintenance costs and was also a fire risk. The docks Dummer designed were stronger with more secure foundations and stepped sides that allowed shorter timbers to be used for shoring and made it much easier for shipwrights to reach the underside of the vessel. These innovations also allowed rapid erection of staging and greater workforce mobility. He discarded the earlier three-sectioned hinged gate, which was labour-intensive in operation, and replaced it with the simpler and more mobile two-sectioned gate. He wished to ensure that naval dockyards were efficient working units that maximised available space, as evidenced by the simplicity of his design layout for Plymouth. He introduced a centralised storage area and a logical positioning of buildings, and his double rope-house combined the previously separate tasks of spinning and laying while allowing the upper floor to be used for the repair of sails.

By 16 September 1694, Dummer reported to the Admiralty, "Our docks here are finished and we purpose to take in the cleaning the mouth of the basin from the dam that stands before it, which will be done in a few days; a more particular account I will give you hereafter". His Account of the Generall Progress and Advancement of his Majestie's New Docks and Yard at Plymouth was presented to the Principal Officers and Commissioners of the Navy in December 1694. It clearly explains the logical thinking behind his planning of the works, influenced by his extensive travels. Typically, to the description of works undertaken he appended eight draughts: plans of the site, the yard and the dry dock, plans and elevations for the officers' dwelling houses, the great store house, hemp house, rope house and rope yard buildings, for "by representations and descriptions of works of this nature, when they are disposed in a manner most familiar and easy of the understanding, one finds at once both encouragement in the contemplation, and satisfaction in the judging of them". The drawings therefore served as a means of explanation and a form of advocacy, as well as evidence of and pride in his achievement.

In his design for the docks at Devonport, Dummer sought to arrange the buildings as efficiently as possible to eliminate the "great abuses committed in their Majesties' yards" such as "the tedious and expensive practices of carrying all things afloat for expediting of ship works, and which are many times very remote from the places where materials are kept, and workmen resort". This led to time-wasting and obstruction and presented opportunities for embezzling ships' stores. Because of the innumerable abuses, "too many to be named, and some too subtle to be discovered", Dummer ensured that men and materials were placed close together under the constant eye of command, saving time and costs. The thirteen officers' dwelling houses were similarly sited "on the most eminent spot of ground in the yard, for the officers' better observance of things abroad, and readier communication and conference with one another, on all occasions".

An abstract of the costs in Dummer's 1694 account amounted to £50,000, but he was at pains to point out that this was because of the greatness and novelty of the works, which overcame the deficiencies of the other yards. Obstructions had been brought about because of the irregular cash flow, the weakness of contracts and "the imbecile stock of a private man under the weight of so chargeable a work" (probably referring to the stonemason Robert Waters who was also blamed by Dummer for problems with the works), not to mention the fact that the country was at war. Increases on the original estimate (£23,406 in 1692, which nearly tripled by 1698) had, he maintained with some aplomb, been made purposefully by stealth so that they would be borne more easily, rather than by demanding too great a lump sum and getting rejected at the outset.

=== Portsmouth ===
In 1689, Parliament ordered one new dry dock and two new wet docks (or non-tidal basins) to be built at Portsmouth and work began in 1691 at an estimated cost of £15,890. It was built to new designs developed by Dummer who again substituted brick and stone for wood and increased the number of altars or steps. As with all future extensions, the new works were built on reclaimed land and the civil engineering involved was on an unprecedented scale. The great stone dock as it was called (extensively rebuilt in 1769 as No.5 dock) was evacuated with chain pumps powered by horses. A building slip was constructed in No.3 dock where the Mary Rose is now housed.

In November 1691 he oversaw the raising and repairing of the 54-gun fourth rate ship St David which had capsized and partially blocked Portsmouth harbour.

== Survey of the South Coast ==
In June 1698, under orders from the Lords of the Admiralty, Dummer undertook a plan to survey various harbours along the south coast of England, at a time when a new war with France was a real threat, and Portsmouth would have been a major target. In the survey, he was assisted by Captain Thomas Wiltshaw, a fellow Navy Board Commissioner and two Masters of Trinity House, Captain James Conaway and William Cruft, who were assisting the Navy because of their navigational experience. The surveying was completed in the months of July and August 1698, with eighteen harbours being visited – the resulting charts appear to be rushed; on close examination they appear to be incomplete as in most cases they show few soundings, only the high and low water lines, and few, if any, navigational features making it difficult for any large vessel to enter one of these so-called ports, but this was not the purpose of this undertaking. Dummer and Wiltshaw were looking for sites for new dockyards, and also to see if any of the existing smaller ports could be improved to accommodate larger vessels.

When all the surveys were completed and the critique written up, the work was addressed to the Principal Officers and Commissioners of His Majesty's Navy and sent to the Lords of the Admiralty some time after 19 November 1698, just over four months after it was started. It was suggested in this report that the only ports worth considering were the ones in the area around Portsmouth and the Isle of Wight and that no further yards should be built between Dover and Land's End. A copy of this report is held by the Hampshire County Council Museums Service.

== Survey of the Royal Navy Dockyards ==
In 1698, Dummer also produced his Survey and Description of the Principal Harbours with their Accommodations & Conveniences for Erecting Moaring Secureing and refitting the Navy Royall of England..., which gave an account of the improvements which had been made at each of the royal dockyards since 1688, with full descriptions of the various buildings with their quantity and value, together with detailed descriptions of the new docks at Portsmouth and Plymouth.

Dummer's survey was part of a general effort on his part and that of a handful of colleagues on the Navy Board to get to grips with the management of the massive business under their charge. Dummer's draughts constitute an extraordinary feat of surveyorship. In the volume, each royal dockyard is treated separately and its description given in the same order, each of the four types of drawing being made to the same scale so that cross-comparisons can be made. The emphasis was on exact measurement, with Dummer combining geometrical precision with great artistry. The first type of drawing relating to each dockyard gives the general situation of the port and harbour; the second focuses on the situation of the yard; the third compares the plan of the yard at the Revolution with its development ten years on, showing the improvements or new buildings added; the fourth – the most extensive section – gives in plan and elevation every single building in each yard.

The Survey first covers each of the royal dockyards on the Thames and Medway – Chatham, Sheerness, Woolwich and Deptford – as well as the Navy Office, before dealing with the dockyards at Portsmouth and Plymouth. In total it was estimated that the value of His Majesty's Dockyards was £291,124, of which £166,799 had been spent in the previous ten years, more than doubling the original value. The greatest investment had been made at Plymouth of £67,095, followed by Portsmouth (£63,384), Deptford (£12,880), Chatham (£11,155), Woolwich (£10,477), Sheerness (£1,566) and finally the Navy Office (£239).

Dummer's achievements as Surveyor for the royal dockyards are highly regarded by present-day naval historians with the new docks at Plymouth and Portsmouth being "lasting monuments of his great skill".

== Parliamentary career ==
In November 1695, Dummer stood for election in Portsmouth. The candidates were Admiral Russell, Alderman Hedger, and Edmund Dummer. The inhabitants of Portsea, Portsmouth living within the jurisdiction of the borough and paying "Scot and lot", supported Dummer and insisted on their right to vote, but were prevented from doing so by measures adopted on behalf of Mr. Hedger. The gates of the town were shut against them, while threats and other unconstitutional measures were resorted to. Although a petition was lodged to have the election overturned, this was not followed up, with Dummer having been elected to represent Arundel in the neighbouring county.

Dummer was elected MP for Arundel three times as a supporter of the court, firstly in 1695 until 1698, when he did not stand for re-election. In January 1701 he was re-elected but this position lasted only ten months when he was replaced by Carew Weekes in November. Dummer returned to Parliament the following year and continued to represent the town for a further six years. In his Parliamentary career, he was a supporter of Robert Harley.

== Greenwich Hospital ==
Dummer was appointed as one of the Governors of the newly opened Greenwich Hospital in 1695, retaining this position until his death in 1713.

== Downfall ==
Dummer's career as Surveyor of the Navy came to an abrupt end in December 1698, when he was suspended without warning following a dispute with John Fitch, the main contractor undertaking building works at Portsmouth Dockyard.

The origin of the dispute went back as far as 1693, when Dummer and Sir Anthony Deane had cause to doubt Fitch's working methods and his claims for payments for "overworks". There had been endless construction problems, caused partly because the new docks were built on unstable reclaimed land. Fitch's workmen had damaged the entrance to the lower basin causing its banks to slide into the channel on the spring tide, leaving the piling exposed and vulnerable. On 20 June 1695, Dummer wrote from Portsmouth to Harley with the news that the dam which had been constructed the previous winter to shelter the work on the new docks from the sea had been breached. The following January and February he was writing to excuse his attendance at Parliament on account of the need to secure the great dam in the face of terrible weather. By the end of 1696, Dummer had finally ejected Fitch because of fraudulent claims for payment and terrible workmanship.

Fitch brought a case for payment against the Crown, with the Attorney General, Richard Haddock, and Dummer himself being named as defendants. The case was first heard in the Court of Exchequer on 23 November 1696 and referred to trial. On 27 April 1697, the Court ordered that the matter be referred for arbitration to four referees, two appointed on behalf of the plaintiff and two on behalf of the defendants, with an umpire to determine between them if they were unable to agree. The party arrived in Portsmouth on 2 June to examine the works and advise on repairs, accompanied by Sir Christopher Wren, in his capacity as Surveyor of the King's Works. After spending a day examining the works, the party returned to London and on 25 August their report took "a very strict view of the nature of the said defects" and confirmed Dummer's condemnation of the workmanship and ordered that the upper wet dock be taken down and rebuilt.

The Exchequer Court issued the final decree in late June or early July 1698, stating that Fitch should have been satisfied with the amounts already paid for the work done on the contract, £13,773 14s 6½d, and rejected his claims for payment on over work not included. It was also accepted that Fitch was still owed for further contract work completed before he was turned off site, valued at £8,757 1s 5d and £2,030 18s for materials.

Fitch then complained to the Admiralty that Dummer had asked for bribes in return for awarding him Navy contracts, claiming specifically that Dummer had told him he would get an immediate certificate for his bill if he made him a present of £100 and helped him with the sale of timber for Plymouth. Although Dummer conceded that he had borrowed £152 from Fitch on behalf of William Wyatt, a Bursledon ship builder, he denied the other charges. With counter-accusations from both sides, Dummer was suspended from office with effect from Christmas Eve 1698.

Although his name was cleared by a civil court, which awarded him damages of £364, his career at the Navy Office was abruptly over. He was allowed the title and salary for 1699 but was not reinstated and dismissed by the Lords of the Admiralty on 10 August 1699, with Daniel Furzer, Master Shipwright at Chatham, being appointed in his place from 22 September.

== Sowley Ironworks ==
In 1700 he and his cousin and namesake, Edmund Dummer of South Stoneham (with whom he has been confused) helped to finance an ironworks at Sowley, near Beaulieu in Hampshire, leased from Ralph, Lord Montagu to Henry Corbett, ironmaster, who had manufactured the two-sectioned gate at Dummer's dry dock at Portsmouth. The works obtained many orders for iron wares from Portsmouth dockyard.

Henry Corbett died in 1708 and Dummer seized his property by writ of exchequer, claiming unpaid debts; Chancery ruled in 1711 that Dummer was the rightful holder of the lease on the ironworks and Corbett's naval contracts. Dummer continued the business until 1712 whilst his brother Thomas (an ex-navy purser) continued to supply the navy until 1716.

== Packet service ==
In 1694, when Dummer held the appointment of Surveyor of the Navy, he had supervised the construction of a number of exceptionally fast packet-boats (sloops) for the Post Office packet service from Harwich to the Low Countries. Dummer also operated a packet service between Falmouth, Corunna and Lisbon.

On the loss of his position as Surveyor of the Navy, Dummer devoted much of his energies to studying the problem of a regular packet service between England and the British Island Plantations in the West Indies. In a document dated 18 June 1702, he set out the Terms for settling a monthly intelligence between England and the Island Plantations in the West Indies. Dummer proposed a monthly service to be operated by four oceangoing packet-boats calling at Barbados, Antigua, Montserrat, Nevis and Jamaica.

On 30 June, the Crown agreed Dummer's plan, granting special concessions. He was permitted to fly the Queen's colours on his ships, his crews were exempted from impressment for naval service, and he was granted a letter of marque for the duration of the War of the Spanish Succession which had commenced in the previous year. The first transatlantic mail service directly sponsored by the Post Office was inaugurated on 21 October 1702, with the sailing from Portsmouth for Barbados of Dummer's packet Bridgeman. Bridgeman and its sister ship, Mansbridge, had operated on a mail service between Gravesend and Brill in the Netherlands in 1699 and 1700. Two further ships, the King William, of 90 tons and 8 guns, and the Frankland of 132 tons and 10 guns, were purchased to start the service.

The four vessels were "designed to succeed each other monthly" and whose "motions are determined to be very quick, because thereon depends the chief fruit that is to be reaped". Dummer's fast transatlantic mail service had a best time of 88 days round trip (just under three months).

Dummer's packet service created the pattern which has been adapted by subsequent overseas mail services for the British Empire – a service operated privately albeit with a heavy Government subsidy. To begin with, Dummer submitted his expenses to the Postmaster General who passed them on to the Treasury. During the first year £9,000 was impressed for the service, but the Treasury were so slow in paying that Dummer's finances could not stand the strain. In 1704 he was granted a salary as a Commissioner of the Navy, to be paid as from the date of the beginning of the service.

In the following year a new contract was drawn up to run for at least three years, or five years if the war continued. Under this a monthly service was to be maintained by a fleet of five vessels; Dummer was to receive £12,500 per annum, and was to be allowed to carry for his own profit 5 tons of freight on the outward journeys, and 10 tons on the homeward runs. In return he was to accept all risks to the ships and was responsible for replacements if they were lost or captured; further, he guaranteed that the Post Office would receive £8,000 per annum from the mail and passengers carried. For this new contract five new ships were built: Queen Anne, Prince George, Jamaica, Barbadoes and Antegoe. Each of these vessels was of 200 tons, armed with 20 guns, and with two decks; they were also fitted with 24 oars apiece to enable them to escape from attacking vessels in the calms, often met with in the Caribbean.

By 1707 Dummer realised that he could no longer maintain the service as long as the clause guaranteeing the £8,000 income to the Crown remained in the contract. This resulted in a further contract being drawn up on 25 January 1708. Under this he was to continue the monthly service with five vessels; to supply stores and ammunition, and to be responsible for the payment of the crews; and to take all risks from the loss of ships. He was to be allowed £12,000 a year during time of war, and £8,000 in peacetime, together with all proceeds of cargo and passengers, whilst the revenue from the Mail was to go to the Crown.

Even with this new contract, however, it was impossible to carry on the service indefinitely. Dummer had to borrow money on the security of future payments. By the end of 1711, with the return of the packet Martlett, the service came to an end.

The loss of ships from enemy action during the War of the Spanish Succession and losses from storms, had left Dummer bankrupt. In nine years, Dummer had lost two packets at sea and had seven captured. His remaining seven packets were seized by creditors & the service lapsed.

It was not until 1745 that the Post Office re-introduced a service to the West Indies, based on Dummer's original plans, in response to demands from merchants, due to the growth of British interests in sugar plantations.

== Shipbuilder for the Navy ==
Dummer continued his association with the Royal Navy through his shipbuilding interests at Blackwall. In 1704 he presented to the Admiralty a model and a draught for a small vessel designed to "cruise on the coast of this Kingdom" and "to row with oars" as well as sail. On 7 March 1704, the Admiralty instructed the Navy Board to contract with Dummer to build two vessels to this design. These two sloops, HMS Ferret and HMS Weazle, were significantly greater in size and firepower than earlier unrated craft. These 128-ton vessels were the first sloops built to serve as effective warships, carrying eight minions and two falconets, subsequently replaced by a uniform armament of twelve 3-pounder guns.

In 1709 Dummer also designed and built at Rotherhithe the small Sixth rate HMS Swan by contract with the Navy Board, and in the same year they purchased from him a similar vessel which he was building there on speculation – the Sixth rate HMS Hind. French privateers captured Ferret in 1706, the Hind unfortunately stranded and wrecked off the Isle of Wight just two months after her launch in 1709, and the Weazle and Swan were sold in 1712.

== South Stoneham House ==
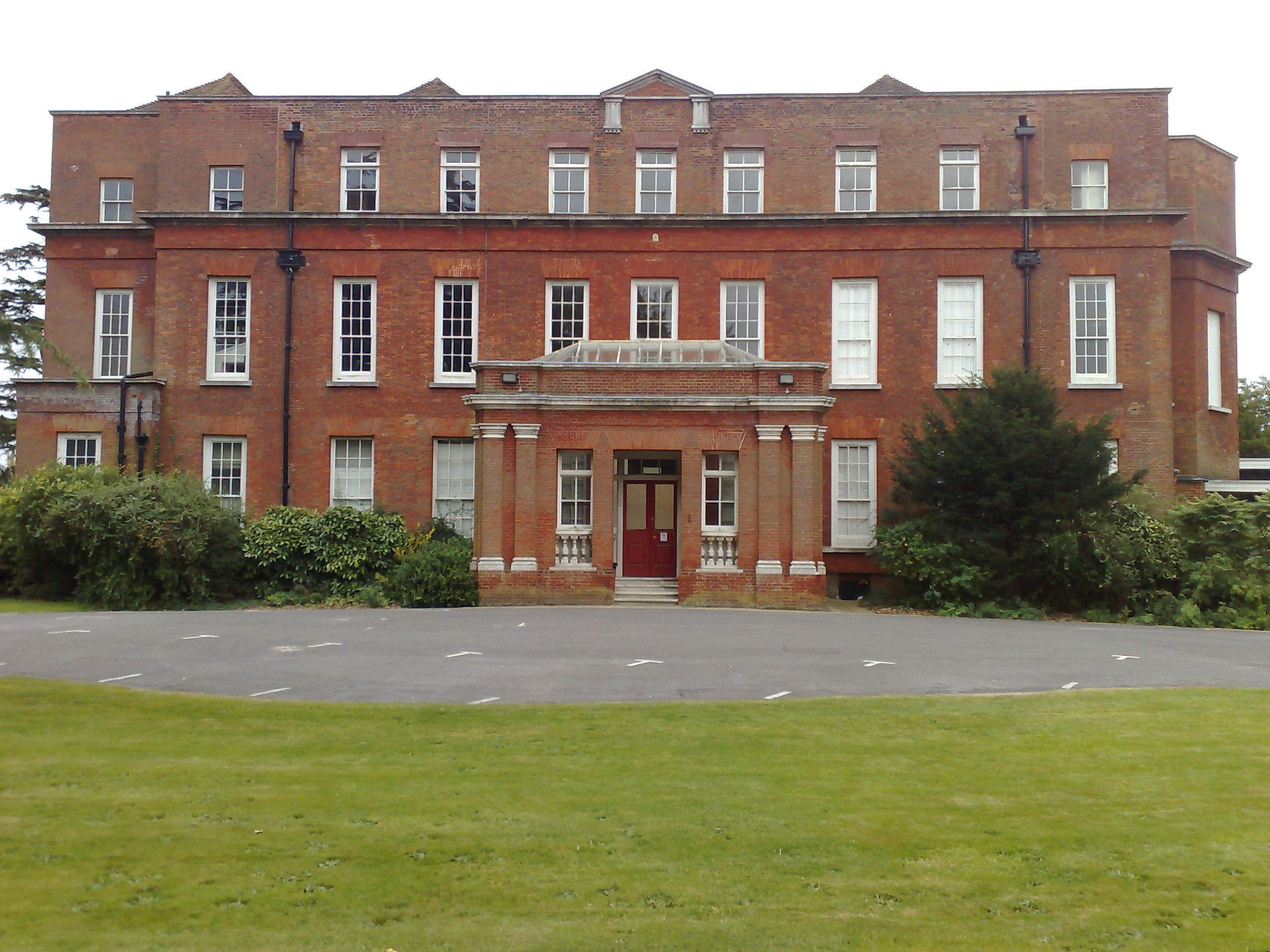
South Stoneham House

In 1705, Dummer acquired the estate at South Stoneham, near Southampton from Giles Frampton and by 1708 South Stoneham House was completed, probably to the designs of the architect Nicholas Hawksmoor.

== Bankruptcy and death ==
Dummer was declared bankrupt in February 1711, and although he was released from the Fleet Prison soon afterwards he was recommitted to the Fleet in April 1712. He died there at the end of April 1713 and was buried at St Andrew's, Holborn on 8 May 1713.

After his death, the business at Sowley was bought from his creditor, the Duke of Montagu, by his brother, who ran the ironworks until 1716.

In December 1713, a petition from his widow, Sarah, and his unmarried daughter, Jane, who were close to destitution, was presented to the Navy Board. The petition was heard by Dummer's former political mentor, Robert Harley as Secretary to the Lord High Treasurer. In the light of Dummer's earlier services as a civil engineer, they were granted a pension of £150 per annum.

In August 1716, Dummer's estate, including South Stoneham manor and property at Shedfield and Curdridge, were eventually sold by Jane to meet the claims of his creditors. The manor passed to Edward Nicholas of Newton Valence.

== Family ==
Dummer married Sarah in about 1680 and they had five children:

- Mary (1680–1690)
- Sarah (1682–1700)
- Edmund (died 1701)
- Susanna (born 1684, married William Dummer (a cousin) and had two children, Edmund (born 1704) and Sarah (born 1705).)
- Jane

His widow survived him by only a few months and died in early 1714, being buried at St. Margaret's, Westminster on 20 February.

Political offices
Preceded by Sir John Tippetts	Surveyor of the Navy; 1692–1699	Succeeded by Daniel Furzer
Parliament of England
Preceded by John Cooke; James Butler	Member of Parliament for Arundel; 1695–1698; With: Lord Henry Howard	Succeeded by John Cooke; Christopher Knight
Preceded by Christopher Knight	Member of Parliament for Arundel; January – November 1701; With: John Cooke	Succeeded by Carew Weekes
Preceded by John Cooke	Member of Parliament for Arundel; 1702–1708; With: Carew Weekes (1702–1705); James Butler (1705–1707)	Succeeded by Parliament of Great Britain
Parliament of Great Britain
Preceded by Parliament of England	Member of Parliament for Arundel; 1707–1708; With: James Butler	Succeeded by Sir Henry Peachey, Bt; The Viscount Shannon
