= Charles Howard, 7th Earl of Suffolk =

British peer (1693–1722)

Personal details
- Born: 9 May 1693
- Died: 8 February 1722 (aged 28)
- Spouse: Arabella Astry (m. 1715)
- Parent: Henry Howard (father)
- Relatives: Edward Howard (uncle)
- Education: Magdalene College, Cambridge

Charles William Howard, 7th Earl of Suffolk, 2nd Earl of Bindon (9 May 1693 – 8 February 1722) was a British peer, styled Lord Chesterford from 1706 to 1709 and Lord Walden from 1709 to 1718. He was educated at Magdalene College, Cambridge. He succeeded Henry Howard, 6th Earl of Suffolk in 1718.

In 1715, Howard married Arabella, the daughter and one of the heirs of Elizabeth Morse and Samuel Astry. The Morse family owned the "Great House" in Henbury in Bristol and Howard lived there with his wife.

Enslaved man Scipio Africanus worked for Howard in the Great House and at some point appears to have been made a freed servant. He was buried with an unusually elaborate gravestone. Just over one year after Africanus' death, Howard died in February 1722, and then Arabella died four months later.

Honorary titles
Preceded by The Earl of Suffolk	Lord Lieutenant of Essex; 1718–1722	Succeeded by The Earl of Thomond
Peerage of England
Preceded by Henry Howard	Earl of Suffolk; 1718–1722	Succeeded by Edward Howard
Preceded by Henry Howard	Earl of Bindon; 1718–1722	Extinct
