= William Garway =

English politician

William Garway or Garraway (1617 – 4 August 1701), of Ford, Sussex was an English politician.

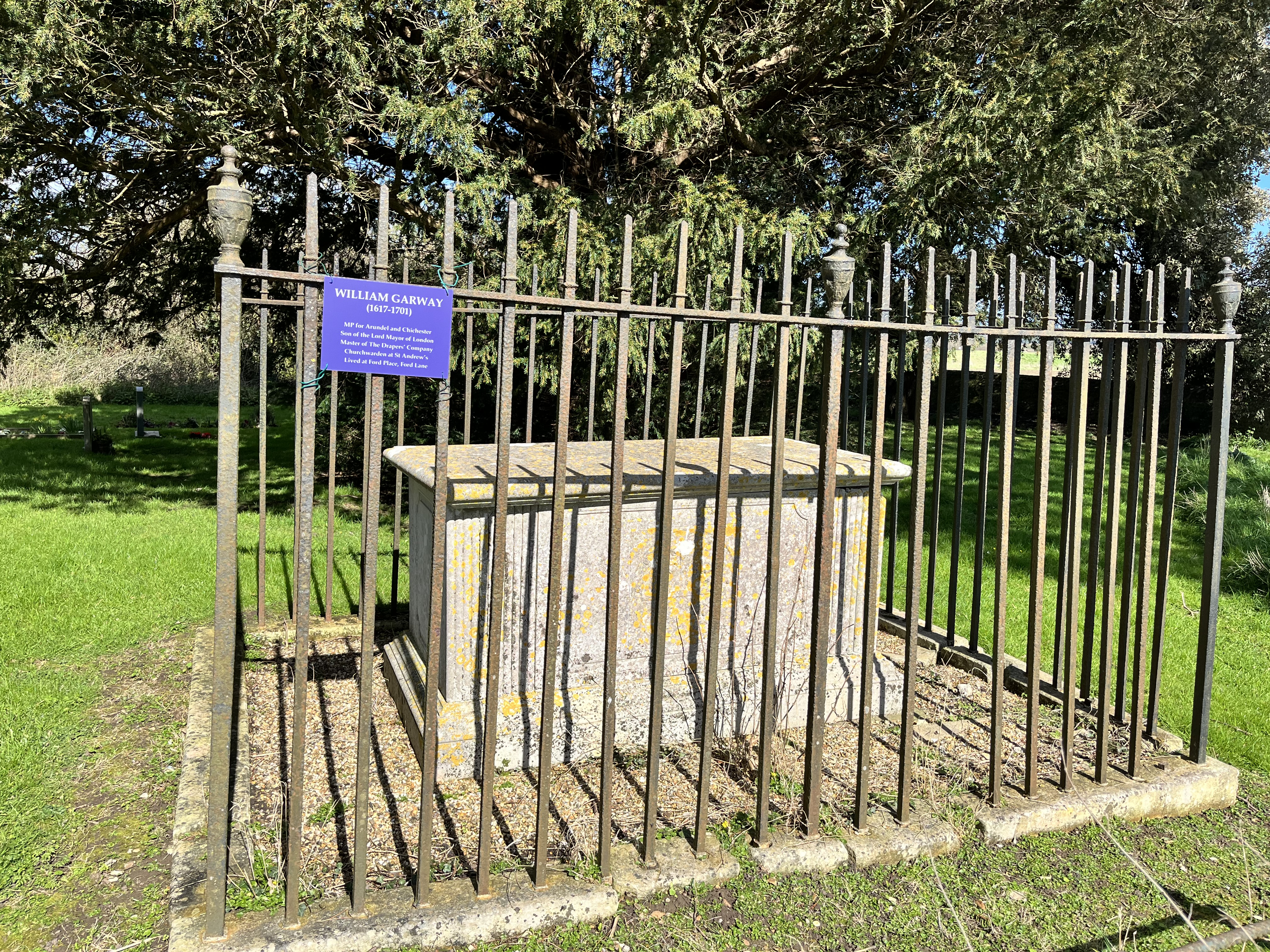
The grave of William Garway at St Andrew's, Ford, West Sussex.

He was the son of Sir Henry Garraway, Lord Mayor of London in 1639–40.

He matriculated at Pembroke College, Cambridge in 1632.

He was a Member (MP) of the Parliament of England for Chichester in 1661 and for Arundel in March 1679, October 1679, 1681, 1685 and 1689.
