= Sir Francis Masham, 3rd Baronet =

English politician

Sir Francis Masham, 3rd Baronet (c. 1646 – 7 February 1723) was an English baronet and politician. He sat as MP for Essex from 1690 till 1698 and February 1701 till 1710.

He was the younger son of William Masham, the son of Sir William Masham, 1st Baronet and Elizabeth, the daughter of Sir John Trevor. On 1 November 1666, he married Mary, the daughter of Sir William Scott, 1st Baronet and had 8 sons and 1 daughter.

He succeeded his brother as baronet circa. 1663.
