= Thomas Middleton (1676–1715) =

English politician (1676–1715)

Thomas Middleton (1676 – 29 April 1715) was an English politician. He sat as MP for Essex from 21 January 1707 till 1713 and 8 February till his death from diabetes on 29 April 1715.

He was baptised on 12 September 1676. He was the first son of Sir Thomas Middleton. He was educated at St. Catharine's College, Cambridge and matriculated in 1696. On 14 July 1696, he married Elizabeth, the daughter of Sir Richard Onslow, 3rd Baronet and they had five daughters.
