= Howard (surname) =

- Pronunciation: HOW-erd

Other names
- Variant forms: Howerd, Heward and Huard

Howard is a common English surname. There are multiple possible origins of the name. The dominant theory pertains to the French personal names Huard and Houard adapted after the Norman Conquest of 1066. It is from a Germanic source similar to Old High German *Hugihard "heart-brave," or *Hoh-ward, literally "high defender; chief guardian." Also probably in some cases a confusion with cognate Anglo-Scandinavian personal name Haward from Hávarðr, which means ha(r) "high" (or hǫð "battle") and element varðr, meaning "guardian", and sometimes also with unrelated Hayward. In some rare cases from Old English eowu hierde "ewe herd." In Anglo-Norman the French digramm -ou- was often rendered as -ow- such as couard → coward, tour → tower, flour (western variant form of fleur) → flower, etc. (the last two examples with svarabakhti, typical of the Anglo-Norman language). The first public record of the surname is dated 1221 in Cambridgeshire. There are several variant surname spellings.

== Disambiguation pages ==
- Alan Howard (disambiguation), various people
- Anna Howard (disambiguation), various people
- Anne, or Ann, Howard (disambiguation), various people
- Arthur Howard (disambiguation), various people
- Ben Howard (disambiguation), various people
- Charles Howard (disambiguation), various people
- Chris Howard (disambiguation), various people
- Daniel Howard (disambiguation), various people
- David Howard (disambiguation), various people
- Donald Howard (disambiguation), various people
- Edward Howard (disambiguation), various people
- Elizabeth Howard (disambiguation), various people
- Frank Howard (disambiguation), various people
- George Howard (disambiguation), various people
- Jack Howard (disambiguation), various people
- James Howard (disambiguation), various people
- Jane Howard (disambiguation), various people
- John Howard (disambiguation), various people
- Ken Howard (disambiguation), various people
- Leslie Howard (disambiguation), various people
- Mark Howard (disambiguation), various people
- Mary Howard (disambiguation), various people
- Matthew Howard (disambiguation), various people
- Michael Howard (disambiguation), various people
- Paul Howard (disambiguation), various people
- Philip Howard (disambiguation), various people
- Randy Howard (disambiguation), various people
- Richard Howard (disambiguation), various people
- Robert Howard (disambiguation), various people
- Ronald Howard (disambiguation), various people
- Samuel Howard (disambiguation), various people
- Sara Howard (disambiguation), various people
- Scott Howard (disambiguation), various people
- Stephen Howard (disambiguation), various people
- Ted Howard (disambiguation), various people
- Thomas Howard (disambiguation), various people
- Tim Howard (disambiguation), various people
- William Howard (disambiguation), various people

== Aristocracy and royalty ==
- Members of the English aristocratic Howard family
  - Catherine Howard, fifth wife of Henry VIII of England and a member of that family

== Arts and music ==
- Adina Howard (born 1973), American musician
- Alan Howard (actor) (1937–2015), British actor
- Arliss Howard (born 1954), American actor, writer, director
- Barbara Howard (artist) (1926–2002), Canadian artist and wood-engraver
- Barry Howard (1937–2016), English actor
- Billy Howard (comedian), English comedian
- Bryce Dallas Howard (born 1981), American actress, daughter of Ron Howard
- Cecil de Blaquiere Howard (1888–1956), American sculptor
- Charlton Howard (born 2003), Australian rapper, singer, and songwriter, known professionally as the Kid Laroi
- Clayton Howard (1934–2017), British make-up artist
- Clint Howard (born 1959), American actor, brother of Ron
- Constance Howard (actress) (1906–1980), American actress
- Constance Howard (artist) (1910–2000), British textile artist
- Curly Howard (1903–1952), American actor, member of the Three Stooges
- Deborah Howard (born 1946), British art historian, architectural historian, and academic
- Dominic Howard (born 1977), English drummer
- Ellis Howard (born 1997), English actor
- Emily Howard (born 1979) British composer and chess player
- Frank Ernest Howard, English architect, generally known as F.E. Howard
- Gertrude Howard (1892–1934), American actress
- Henry Howard (1769–1847), British artist
- Jan Howard (1929–2020), American country music singer-songwriter
- Jason Howard, American comics artist
- Jean Speegle Howard (1927–2000), American actress, wife of Rance and mother of Ron and Clint
- Kevyn Major Howard (1956–2025), Canadian actor
- Maurice Howard, British art historian
- Miki Howard (born 1960), American jazz singer
- Moe Howard (1897–1975), American actor, member of the Three Stooges
- Rance Howard (1928–2017), American actor, husband of Jean and father of Ron and Clint
- Ron Howard (born 1954), American actor and film director
- Russell Howard (born 1980), English comedian
- Shawn Michael Howard (born 1969), American actor
- Shemp Howard (1895–1955), American actor, member of the Three Stooges
- Sophie Howard (born 1983), British model
- Terrence Howard (born 1969), American actor
- Traylor Howard (born 1966), American actress
- Trevor Howard, (1913–1987), English actor
- Vince Howard, (1929–2002), American film and television actor

== Literature and journalism ==
- Blanche Willis Howard (1847–1898), American author
- Elizabeth Jane Howard (1923–2014), English novelist
- Gorges Edmond Howard (1715–1786) Irish legal and literary writer
- Jane Howard, (1935–1996), journalist known for her work at Life magazine
- J. J. Howard (born 1972), American author
- Keble Howard (1875–1928), English comic author
- Madeline Howard (born 1949), American fantasy author
- Jason J. Howard (born 1977), American author

== Military ==
- Benjamin Howard (Missouri politician) U.S. military officer
- Curtis W. Howard (1917–1942), U.S. Navy officer and Navy Cross recipient
- Hugh W. Howard, U.S. Navy admiral
- John Howard (1912–1999), British Army officer who led the glider-born operation that opened D-Day in 1944
- John Martin Howard (1917–1942), U.S. Navy officer
- Michelle J. Howard (born 1960), American Navy admiral
- Oliver O. Howard (1830–1909), General in the U.S. Civil War

== Politics and law ==
- Asher Howard (1877–1945), American lawyer and politician
- Benjamin Chew Howard American politician
- Carlos Howard, Governor of West Florida
- Carolyn J. B. Howard (1938–2026), American politician from Maryland
- Daniel Edward Howard (1861–1935), president of Liberia
- Edgar Howard (1858–1951), American politician
- Grace Schneiders-Howard (1869–1968), Surinamese social worker and politician
- Henry Howard, American politician
- Jerry Thomas Howard (born 1936), American politician
- John Howard (born 1939), prime minister of Australia (1996–2007)
- Julia C. Howard, American politician
- Karlton Howard, American politician
- Lady Howard Mabuza, Eswatini politician
- Marilyn Howard (1939–2020), American educator and politician
- Michael Howard (formerly Hecht) (born 1941), British Conservative politician
- Milford W. Howard (1862–1937), American politician
- Perry Wilbon Howard (1877–1961), Republican attorney and African American civil rights activist from Mississippi
- Raymond Howard (Missouri politician), American politician, Missouri senator
- Squire E. Howard (1840–1912), Massachusetts politician
- T. R. M. Howard (1908–1976), Afro American civil rights leader
- Vernon Edgar Howard, (1937–1998), American politician
- William Jordan Howard (1799–1862), Mayor of Pittsburgh, Pennsylvania
- William Lorenzo Howard (1921–1994), Mayor of Monroe, Louisiana; partner of Howard Brothers Discount Stores

== Sciences and mathematics ==
- Harvey J. Howard (1880–1956), American ophthalmologist
- Henry Eliot Howard (1873–1940), English amateur ornithologist
- Leland Ossian Howard (1857–1950), American entomologist
- Luke Howard (meteorologist) (1772–1864), British chemist and meteorologist
- Russell J. Howard (born 1950), Australian scientist
- William Alvin Howard (1926–2026), Canadian-born American mathematician and proof theorist

== Sports ==
- Barbara Howard (1920–2017), Canadian sprinter
- Barry Howard (1926–2019), English cricketer
- Barry Howard (1950–2023), English footballer
- Billy Howard (gridiron football) (1950–2005), American football player
- Bob Howard (racing driver) (born 1944), American racing driver
- Bug Howard (born 1994), American football player
- Chaunte Howard (born 1984), American high jumper
- Desmond Howard (born 1970), American football player
- Dwight Howard (born 1985), American basketball player
- Elston Howard (1929–1980), American baseball player
- Frank Howard (American football) (1909–1996), American college football player and coach
- Frank Howard (Australian footballer) (1923–2007), Australian rules footballer
- Frank Howard (baseball) (1936–2023), American outfielder, coach and manager in Major League Baseball
- Frankie Howard (footballer) (1931–2007), English association football player
- George Howard (footballer), Australian footballer
- Harvey Howard, British rugby league footballer
- Isaac Howard (born 2004), American ice hockey player
- Jamie Howard (born 1973), American football player
- Jarveon Howard (born 1999), American football player
- Jay Howard (born 1981), British race car driver
- Jessica Howard (born 1984), American gymnast
- Jett Howard (born 2003), American basketball player
- Jimmy Howard (born 1984), American ice hockey goaltender
- Jordan Howard (born 1994), American football player
- Josh Howard (born 1980), American basketball player
- Juwan Howard (born 1973), American basketball player
- Malcolm Howard (rower), Canadian rower
- Marcus Howard (born 1985), American football player
- Mark Howard (footballer, born January 1986), English former footballer and manager
- Mark Howard (footballer, born September 1986), English footballer
- Markus Howard (born 1999), American basketball player
- Matt Howard (born 1989), American basketball player
- Matt Howard (baseball) (born 1967), American baseball player
- O. J. Howard (born 1994), American football player
- Pat Howard (footballer) (born 1947), English footballer
- Pat Howard (born 1973), Australia rugby team head coach
- Red Howard (1900–1973), American football player
- Rhyne Howard (born 2000), American basketball player
- Ryan Howard (born 1979), American baseball player
- Sam Howard (born 1993), American baseball player
- Sophie Howard (born 1993), Scottish footballer
- Spencer Howard (born 1996), American professional baseball player
- Tim Howard (born 1979), American soccer player
- Tim Howard (field hockey) (born 1996), Australian field hockey player
- Travin Howard (born 1996), American football player
- Tytus Howard (born 1996), American football player
- Walker Howard (born 2003), American football player
- Xavien Howard (born 1993), American football player

== Other ==
- Ada Howard (1829–1907), first president of Wellesley College
- Alan Howard (hedge fund manager) (born September 1963), British hedge fund manager
- Bezaleel Howard (1753–1837), American Congregationalist minister
- Ebenezer Howard (1850–1928), British urban planner and founder of the garden city movement
- Esther Augusta Howard (1845–1925), American clubwoman
- Peggy Chew Howard (1760–1824), First Lady of Maryland
- Walter Henry Howard (1858–1947), South Australian headmaster and Anglican priest

== See also ==
- Heward
