= Charles Howard =

Charles Howard may refer to:

== Dukes ==
- Charles Howard, 10th Duke of Norfolk (1720–1786), English peer and Earl Marshal, 1777–1786
- Charles Howard, 11th Duke of Norfolk (1746–1815), his son, British MP for Carlisle and Arundel, Earl Marshal, 1786–1815

== Earls ==
- Charles Howard, 1st Earl of Nottingham (1536–1624), English Lord Steward and Lord High Admiral
- Charles Howard, 2nd Earl of Nottingham (1579–1642), his son, English peer and Lord Lieutenant of Surrey
- Charles Howard, 3rd Earl of Nottingham (1610–1681), his brother, English peer
- Charles Howard, 2nd Earl of Berkshire (1615–1679), English MP for Oxford
- Charles Howard, 1st Earl of Carlisle (1629–1685), English MP for Cumberland, and lieutenant governor of Jamaica
- Charles Howard, 9th Earl of Suffolk (1685–1733), Irish MP for Carlow Borough
- Charles Howard, 3rd Earl of Carlisle (1669–1738), English MP for Morpeth and First Lord of the Treasury
- Charles Howard, 7th Earl of Suffolk (1693–1722), British peer
- Charles Howard, 17th Earl of Suffolk (1805–1876), British MP for Malmesbury
- Charles Howard, 5th Earl of Wicklow (1839–1881), Earl of Wicklow
- Charles Howard, 10th Earl of Carlisle (1867–1912), soldier and English MP for Birmingham South
- Charles Howard, 20th Earl of Suffolk (1906–1941), English peer and bomb disposal expert
- Charles Howard, 12th Earl of Carlisle (1923–1994), English peer

== Politics and military ==
- Charles Howard (courtier), gentleman at the court of Henry VIII of England, 1500s
- Charles Howard (Windsor MP) (c. 1591–1653), English MP for Bletchingley (1610), New Windsor (1621), Gatton (1625)
- Charles Howard (British Army officer) (c. 1696–1765), British general, son of the 3rd Earl of Carlisle
- Charles Howard, Viscount Morpeth (1719–1741), British member of parliament
- Charles Howard (British politician) (1814–1879), British member of parliament, 1840–1879
- Charles Howard (mayor) (1804–1883), mayor of Detroit, Michigan, 1849
- Charles Henry Howard (1838–1880), Union Army officer during American Civil War, newspaper publisher
- Charles Tisdale Howard (1856–1936), member of the South Dakota House of Representatives
- Charles John Howard (1862–?), American politician in Ohio
- Charles W. Howard (Union Navy officer) (died 1863), namesake of USS Howard
- Charles Benjamin Howard (1885–1964), Canadian member of parliament
- Charles F. Howard (1942–2017), Texas state representative
- Sir Charles Howard (serjeant-at-arms) (1878–1958), British Army officer and parliamentary official
- Charles P. Howard (politician) (1887–1966), American politician in Massachusetts

== Sports ==
- Charles Howard (cricketer, born 1823) (1823–1908), English cricketer who played for Kent
- Charles Howard (cricketer, born 1904) (1904–1982), English cricketer who played for Middlesex
- Charlie Howard (footballer) (born 1989), English professional footballer
- Doc Howard (Charles Howard, 1873–1904), American baseball player

== Other ==
- Charles Howard (FRS) (1630–1713), original fellow of the Royal Society on List of Fellows of the Royal Society elected in 1663
- Charles Beaumont Howard (1807–1843), colonial clergyman in South Australia
- Charles Howard (Marist Brother) (1924–2012), Australian leader of the Marist Brothers religious order
- Charles T. Howard (1832–1885), founded the Louisiana State Lottery Company, philanthropist
- Charles Howard (police officer) (1833–1909), English assistant commissioner of London police, 1890–1902
- Charles Howard (photographer) (1842–?), American soldier and photographer
- Charles S. Howard (1877–1950), American automobile entrepreneur and owner of race horse Seabiscuit
- Charles P. Howard (labor leader) (1879-1938), American labor union leader
- Charles P. Howard Sr. (1894–1969), African American trial lawyer, journalist, political leader, and civil right activist
- Charles W. Howard (1896–1966), American actor who appeared as Santa Claus in department stores
- Charlie Howard (murder victim) (1961–1984), killed in assault in Bangor, Maine, for homosexuality

== See also ==
- Charlie Howard (disambiguation)
- Chuck Howard (1933–1996), American TV producer
