= Howard Thomas =

Howard Thomas may refer to:

- Howard Thomas (producer) (1909–1986), Welsh radio producer and television executive
- Howard Thomas (scientist) (1948–2022), Welsh plant scientist
- Howard Thomas (wrestler) (1905–1995), Canadian wrestler
- Howard C. Thomas (born 1945), British hepatologist and academic

== See also ==
- Thomas Howard (disambiguation)
