= James Howard =

James or Jim Howard may refer to:

== Government and politics ==
- James Howard, 3rd Earl of Suffolk (1619–1688/1607–1688), grandson of Thomas Howard
- James Scott Howard (1798–1866), Canadian public servant
- James Howard (Whig politician) (1814–1882), British Whig MP
- James Howard (agriculturalist) (1821–1889), British Liberal MP, manufacturer and agriculturalist
- James L. Howard (1818–1906), American businessman and lieutenant governor of Connecticut
- James J. Howard (1927–1988), American educator and U.S. congressman from New Jersey

== Entertainment ==
- James Howard (dramatist) (died 1669), English dramatist
- James Newton Howard (born 1951), American film score composer
- James Howard (writer) (born 1956), screenwriter, poet, computer game creator

== Sports ==
- James H. Snook (1879–1930), American Olympic sportsperson and murderer, labelled as only "James Howard" on his gravestone
- Jim Howard (high jumper) (born 1959), American athlete
- James Howard (basketball) (born 1969), American basketball coach
- Jimmy Howard (born 1984), American ice hockey goaltender

== Other ==
- James H. Howard (1913–1995), U.S Medal of Honor recipient in World War II
- James M. Howard Jr. (1922–2002), American teacher and educational advocate
- James F. Howard Jr. (born 1948), American medical academic
- James Howard (soldier) (?–1879), American soldier and Medal of Honor recipient
- James & Frederick Howard, English makers of agricultural equipment
