= Charlie Howard =

Charlie Howard may refer to:

- Charlie Howard (1961–1984), gay-bashing victim killed in 1984
- Charles F. Howard (1942–2017), known as Charlie, Texas state representative
- Charlie Howard (footballer) (born 1989), footballer currently playing for Gillingham
- Charlie Howard (cricketer) (1854–1929), English cricketer

== See also ==
- Charles Howard (disambiguation)
