= Bezalel (disambiguation) =

Bezalel was the chief artisan of the Tabernacle and the Ark of the Covenant, as described in the Book of Exodus.

Bezalel or Bezaleel may also refer to:

== People ==
- Bezalel Ashkenazi (c. 1520–c. 1592), Palestinian rabbi and Talmudist
- Bezalel Bar-Kochva (born 1941), Israeli historian
- Bezaleel Howard, (1753–1837), American Congregationalist minister
- Bezalel Narkiss (1926–2008), Israeli art historian
- Bezalel Rakow (1927–2003), English Orthodox rabbi
- Bezalel Ronsburg (1760–1820), Bohemian Talmudist, rabbi, dayan, and rosh yeshiva
- Bezalel Smotrich (born 1980), Israeli politician and lawyer
- Bezaleel Wells (1773–1846), American politician, judge, and surveyor
- Hezi Bezalel (born 1951), Israeli businessman
- Judah Loew ben Bezalel (1520–1609), Talmudic scholar, Jewish mystic, mathematician, astronomer, philosopher, and rabbi

== Other uses ==
- Bezalel Academy of Arts and Design, an Israeli design and art college
- Bezalel school, a Palestinian art movement

== See also ==
- Bezaliel, an angel in the Book of Enoch
