= Mildred Mottahedeh =

American porcelain seller and collector

- Born: Mildred Ruth Wurtzel; August 7, 1908; Sea Bright, New Jersey, US
- Died: February 17, 2000 (aged 91); Manhattan, New York, US
- Occupations: Ceramics collector, businessperson
- Employer(s): Mottahedeh & Company
- Children: 2; including Roy Mottahedeh

Mildred Ruth Mottahedeh (née Wurtzel; August 7, 1908 – February 17, 2000) was an American collector of ceramics, businessperson, and philanthropist. With her husband, Rafi Y. Mottahedeh, she co-founded Mottahedeh & Company, a designer and supplier of luxury porcelain based on historical models or direct replicas. The couple also gathered a large personal collection of antiques, mainly Chinese export porcelain.

Mottahedeh was born in New Jersey and moved to New York City while still a child. There she met and married Rafi Mottahedeh, and the couple began importing antique porcelain to sell in America. Around World War II, they shifted their focus to producing reproductions of and original pieces based on antiques. The company grew to supply reproductions to museums and other prominent institutions. Many of the pieces were designed by Mildred, who handled much of the company's designs and production. She traveled widely for the company and rose to the position of president after her husband's death.

Mottahedeh's private porcelain collection was considered one of the finest in the world. She also engaged in philanthropic efforts, traveling around the world to advise local artisans. She served as a representative for the Baháʼí Faith, notably to the United Nations.

== Early life ==
Mildred Ruth Wurtzel was born on August 7, 1908, in Sea Bright, New Jersey, to Flora Margolius and Jacob B. Wurtzel. Her father was the owner of a grocery in Seabright and her mother was the daughter of Joseph Margolius, who owned the Hotel Brighton in Long Branch, New Jersey. They married in 1903 in an Orthodox Jewish wedding. By 1911 the couple was in the process of getting a divorce, and Mildred was living with her three siblings and her mother.

She was educated at the Garfield Avenue School in Long Branch and attended the New Jersey College for Women. By the time she was thirteen she had moved to New York City and begun to collect Japanese prints after winning one in a contest. At around the age of 19, she converted to Protestantism from Judaism, before becoming a Bahá'i to marry Rafi Y. Mottahedeh, an anthropologist, in 1929. They had two children, including Roy P. Mottahedeh, a historian.

== Career ==
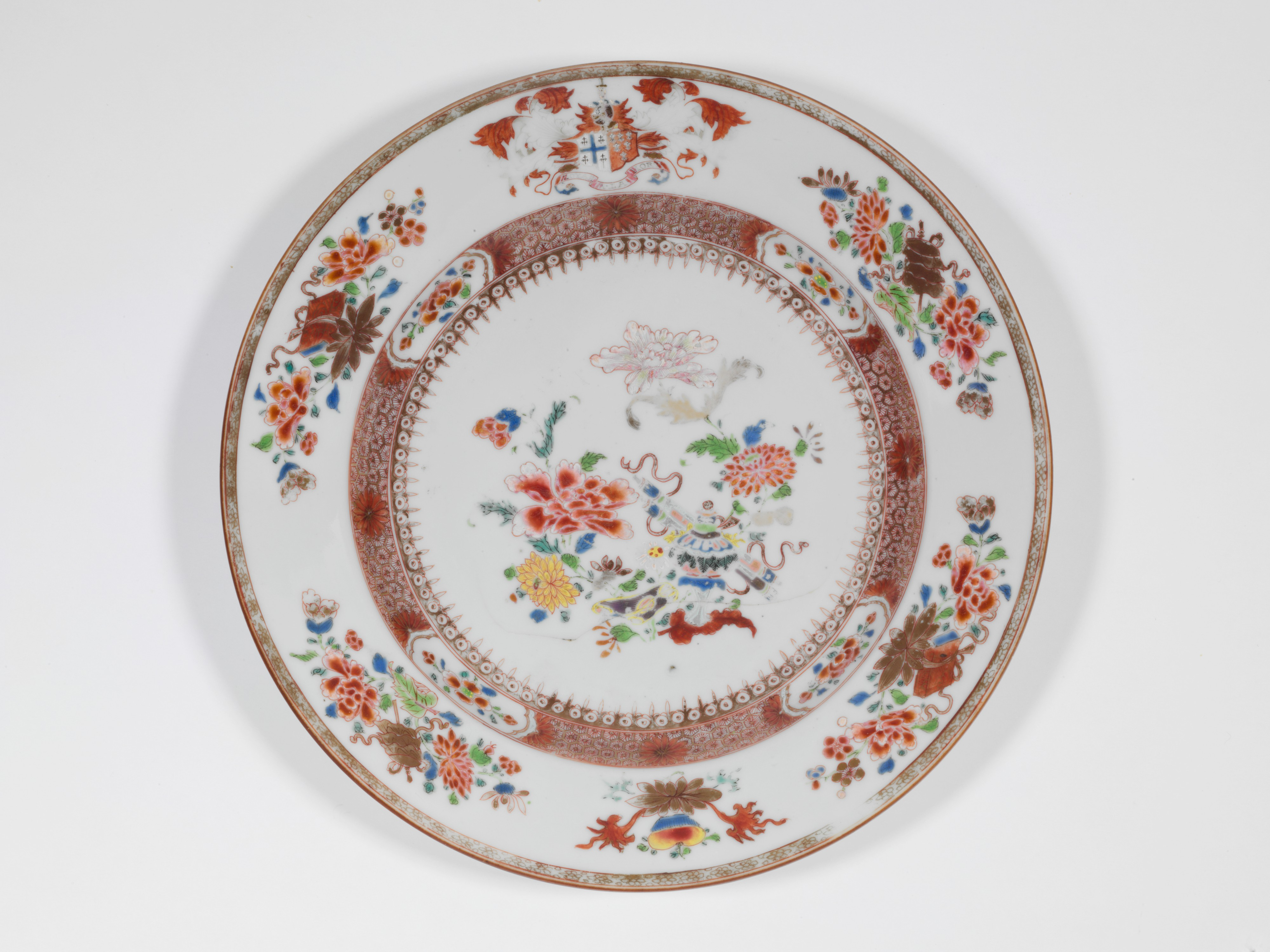
A plate from the Mottahedeh collection, gifted to the Metropolitan Museum of Art

Mottahedeh found work as an interior designer in Manhattan. In 1929 she joined Mottahedeh & Company, a porcelain company that her husband had founded in 1924. They initially focused on importing antique porcelain, much of it valuable artifacts of the Ming era, as her husband's family shipped crates of china from Tehran. Mottahedeh did interior design work for Herbert Hoover when he was president. Throughout the 1930s, the couple sold thousands of antique plates to Macy's. (Note: The plates were sold for $87.50, but were worth several thousand dollars by 1989.) They switched to making porcelain reproductions of the Ming plates around the end of World War II, as the amount of porcelain available to import declined. The move made Mottahedeh & Co. one of the earliest companies to make such reproductions.

As a pioneer in the field at a time when many museums frowned upon reproductions, Mottahedeh advocated heavily in favor of them, saying "If we didn't reprint books, look at how much we'd lose in history ... The same is true of porcelain. If we didn't remake them, we'd lose all those designs." She also described the reproductions as "democratizing" porcelain. Mildred designed some of the original pieces the company made based upon her research and inspired by antiques. An obituary published in Classic American Homes described her as "the driving creative force" behind the company. The company grew, producing around 2,000 different items for numerous shops, supplying around 3,000.

The couple soon began collecting and selling Chinese export porcelain that had been made between 1600 and the 1870s and eventually added reproductions of that style to their line. In the 1940s Mottahedeh began to travel to Europe, where she worked directly with factories contracted by their company. Manufacturing had grown to be a full-time career for the couple by the 1950s. Their reproductions were of a sufficient quality that some designs became considered collectibles and others were falsely re-sold as originals. A well-known product of the company was the Mottahedeh "Tobacco Leaf" pattern, based on 18th-century Chinese export porcelains for the Portuguese market, which employed 27 underglaze, enamel colors, and gilding. Mottahedeh designed the "Tobacco Leaf" piece.

Mottahedeh focused on the company's designs and the technology and process of their reproductions while her husband managed its finances and the administrative side. In her early career she continued to travel to Europe often to visit their factories (four times a year in 1961), and had made the trip sixty times by April 1961. In 1966, a newspaper profile wrote that she traveled 50 to 60,000 miles a year and had "done it for 30 years". When Queen Elizabeth II visited the US in 1972, the company designed a plate for the occasion. She became president of the company upon the death of her husband in 1978, and held that role until 1998, when she retired. Mottahedeh visited Jingdezhen, China, in 1979 with Charles Donahue, their first time traveling to the country. By the late 1980s, the company had contracts with nine factories around the world to produce its porcelain. She also designed a "farewell gift to heads of state" for Ronald Reagan. In 1989, Mottahedeh was abroad for five months a year, mainly visiting companies that made her company's china.

Their company made pieces for organizations that included the Metropolitan Museum of Art, the Museum of Modern Art, the Musée des Arts Décoratifs, Paris, Colonial Williamsburg, Historic Charleston, the Smithsonian Institution, the United States Department of State, and the White House. Its work was used in three presidential inaugurations. For instance, Mottahedeh designed porcelain pieces for George H. W. Bush's inauguration. They were based on a plate dating to the late 1700s and featured the goddesses of peace and prosperity, an American eagle and 200 white stars—symbolic of the 200 years since the first inauguration.

In September 1992 Mottahedeh sold her company to Grant and Wendy Kvalheim. They retained Mottahedeh as president, and five months later she told HFD that "I'm still doing the designing and I'm still doing all the public talks and public relations". The Kvalheims worked with Mottahedeh to expand recognition of the company's name, in large part by increasing the advertising budget by 800 percent to run large ads in magazines aimed at consumers. In 1996, she reported working with "31 museums and 25 castles". She worked for the company as a consultant for five years before completely retiring. Mottahedeh was described in HFD as one of few women prominent in leadership of 'tabletop industry' companies (ones that produced dinnerware, glassware, or silverware).

=== Consultancy ===
As an authority on the production of china and importation of goods, Mottahedeh traveled around the world to consult on the development of other "small industries and handi-crafts," visiting France and Greece in 1961 and also advising in countries such as China, Morocco, Greece, Sardinia, Italy, and India. In 1982, The Christian Science Monitor described Mottahedeh as "one of the foremost international authorities on Chinese export porcelain". She worked to revitalize China's porcelain industry, partnering with the Chinese government. As part of her efforts, Mottahedeh visited the nation several times to help the nation modernize its methods of porcelain production and raise standards, for instance through firing the china by means of methane gas instead of using dragon kilns. She planned to organize the world's first major exhibition of antique Chinese export porcelain in Portugal in 1984. Her efforts in China were included in a 1984 television series, The Heart of the Dragon.

Mottahedeh was credited with assisting in "revitalizing the brass industry in India" after teaching brass-makers there and in Nepal how to make products that would appeal to American buyers. Mottahedeh taught craftspeople from Greece, Sardinia and Italy in a seminar organized by the Organization for European Economic Co-operation. She also gave lectures and wrote about the history of ceramics.

=== Collection ===
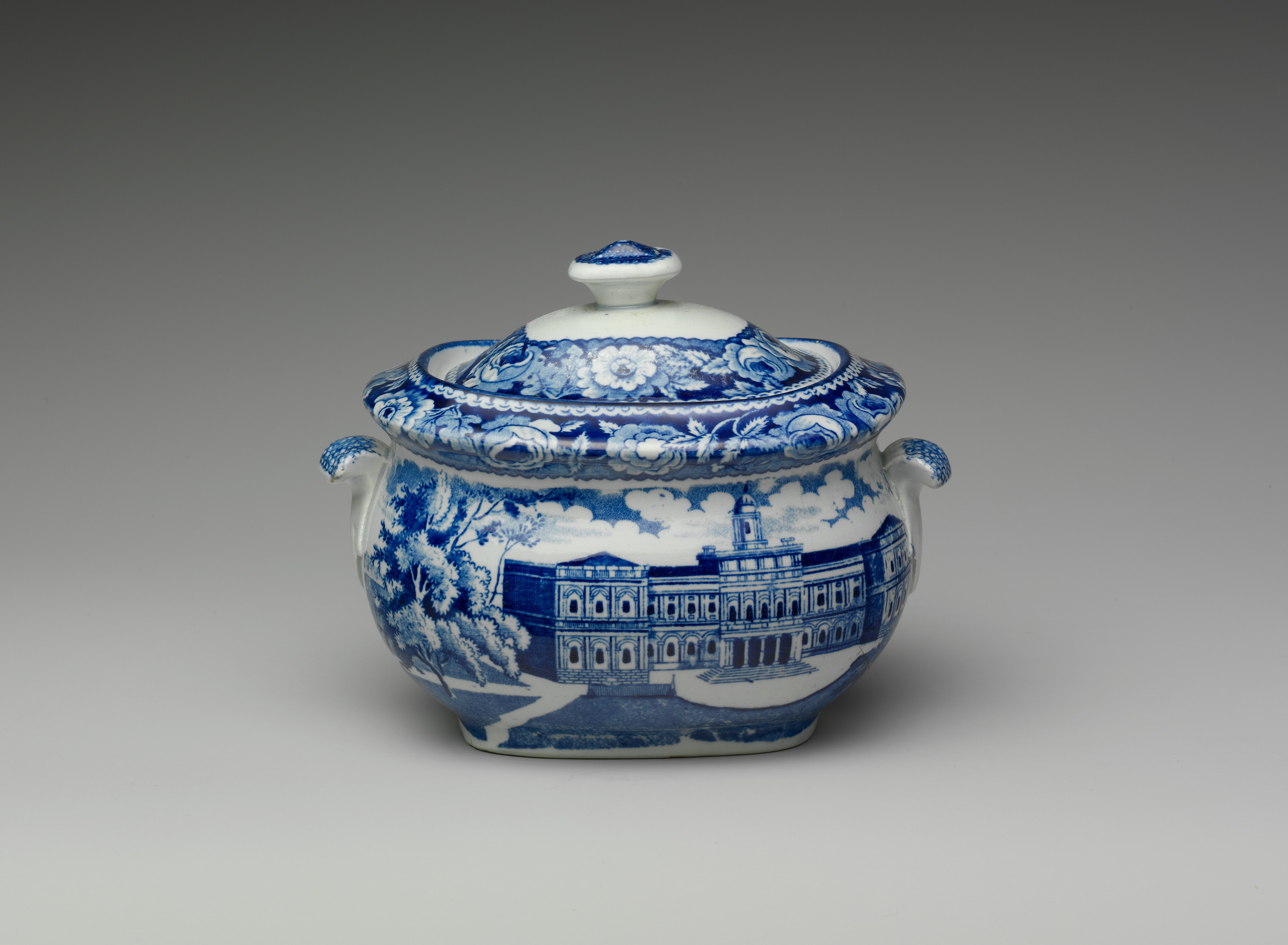
A sugar bowl from the Mottahedeh collection, now held by the Metropolitan Museum of Modern Art

Mottahedeh and her husband maintained a private collection of Chinese export porcelain and items made from ivory, jade, and bronze. They collected artifacts as they traveled around the world, and the collection grew to around 2,000 pieces. The porcelain collection was catalogued by David Howard and John Ayers in the 704-page book China For The West. Nelson Rockefeller wrote in the catalogue's introduction that the collection was "utterly fabulous, an artistic and cultural treasure without comparison in its field". The Times described the book as a "milestone in the charting of the China trade", and in 2000 Art+Auction deemed the book "a standard reference work in the field." Mottahedeh was known to lend portions of her collection to museums. She also had a library with around 3,000 volumes.

Mottahedeh was known in the collecting industry as "Mrs. M". In the mid-1980s, after she was unable to find a museum willing to purchase it, Mottahedeh decided to put some of her collection up for auction through Sotheby's. At the time, The Philadelphia Inquirer wrote that the sale would "feel like the loss of a family" to her. The auction was expected to raise more than $500,000, with the majority of the proceeds to go towards philanthropic endeavors. The auction, which was held on January 30, 1985, included 376 auction items, and resulted in 97 percent of them being sold for around $1.05 million. A punch bowl from the collection sold for $29,800, the highest price paid for a porcelain punch bowl to that date. The auction was credited with "revitalizing" the market for export porcelain.

Even after the sale, in 1986 her collection held 450 pieces of Chinese export porcelain, 700 other items from China, and 175 porcelain pieces from Europe. In 1989 she reported having "18 rooms of things I love up in the country and five rooms of things I love in town." In December 2000, after Mottahedeh's death, 466 lots were put up for auction through Sotheby's. The auction netted $4.3 million. Over 3/4 of the items sold at prices above "their high estimates".

=== Philanthropy and faith ===
Mottahedeh was also known as a representative of the Baháʼí Faith. She had converted to the faith in 1929, when she met her husband. Mottahedeh was present at the signing of the Charter of the United Nations and served as the first representative for the Baháʼí community to the United Nations from 1948 to 1967. As a representative, she advocated and worked for the establishment of a World Parliament. Also in her capacity as the representative, she was founder and executive secretary of the Speakers Research Committee. She attended at least two conferences of international non-governmental organizations in Geneva. In 1961 she went on a speaking tour around the United States to promote the Baháʼí Faith and advocate for religious tolerance. That same year she was elected to the International Baháʼí Council. In 1966, she was the principal speaker at the National Convention of the Baháʼí World Faith in the Chateau Laurier. In 1993, the United Nations named her the United Nations Woman of Honor for that year. Mottahedeh was also considered a pioneer in Baháʼí involvement in socioeconomic development.

Mottahedeh helped to found 15 African schools, including several schools in Uganda. She and her husband oversaw the development of four villages in Maharashtra, India and from 1953, they began work in Uganda, after a visit to the nation. The two established Mottahedeh Development Services, a charity aimed at encouraging social development in Third World countries, in 1958. The charity's stated mission was "to do good work in backward countries" by providing funding for social development programs in various nations such as Uganda, Zaire, India, Samoa and Micronesia. In 1984 the foundation was reported to spend around $250,000 a year for projects. By the following year it had established 24 literacy centers in India and hired professionals to visit around one hundred villages to help them modernize. Also in India, Mottahedeh provided funding for the creation and early development of the New Era High School and the New Era Development Institute. The programs run in Samoa taught wood and pearl carving.

== Personal life, honors, and death ==
Mottahedeh visited over ninety countries. In 1987, Portugal granted her the Order of Prince Henry the Navigator after she visited Vista Alegre, one of Mottahedeh & Co.'s subcontractors, to ensure a product of an acceptable quality. She was a Fellow of the Royal Society of Arts, a fellow of the Metropolitan Museum of Art, and member of the Oriental Ceramic Society. In the mid-1990s a scholarship for the Fashion Institute of Technology was created in her name.

Mottahedeh died on February 17, 2000, at Manhattan's NewYork-Presbyterian Hospital. Upon her death, Barbara Bush said that "Mildred Mottahedeh was a patriotic American who generously gave her beautiful porcelain to the White House and State Department... Mottahedeh was a friend and a genius." In her memoir, Barbara Bush: A Memoir, Bush described Mottahedeh as: "that brilliant business lady who reproduces some of the most magnificent porcelains from around the world". Carl C. Dauterman, a former curator of the Metropolitan Museum's European Decorative Arts program, said that "Mrs. Mottahedeh is one of those rare persons whose careers run in the same channel as their avocations. Her business is running the world's most successful organization for the replication of antique porcelain, and as a hobby [she] has assembled the finest private collection of China-trade porcelains. For energy, business acumen, and a discerning eye, she has no peer in the porcelain world."

== Bibliography ==
- Sims, Barbara R. (1998). Unfurling the Divine Flag in Tokyo: An Early Baháʼí History. Shinjuku-ku, Tokyo: Japan Baháʼí Publishing Trust. p. 66. ISBN 4-938975-06-8.
