= Houard =

Houard is a French surname. Notable people with the surname include:

- Clodomir Houard (1873–1943), French botanist and entomologist
- Marie-Claire Houard, Belgian civil servant

== See also ==
- Howard
