= Matthew Howard =

Matthew or Matt Howard may refer to:

- Matthew Munsel Howard (1794–1879), miller, farmer and political figure in Upper Canada
- Douglas Heyes (1919–1993), American film and television writer, sometimes credited under the pseudonym Matthew Howard
- Matthew O. Howard (1956–2018), professor for human services policy information
- Matthew Howard III (born 1959), American neurosurgeon, electrophysiologist, and inventor
- Matt Howard (baseball) (born 1967) American Major League Baseball second baseman
- Matthew Howard (footballer) (born 1970), English football defender
- Matt Howard (born 1989), American professional basketball player

== See also ==
- Matthew Howard-Gibbon (1796–1873), British officer
