= Heward =

Heward is a surname. Notable people with the surname include:

- Anthony Heward (1918–1995), RAF commander
- Brian Heward (1935–2012), English footballer
- Dag Heward-Mills (born 1963), English-born evangelist etc. in Ghana
- Ian Heward (born 1964), British racing driver
- Jamie Heward (born 1971), Canadian ice hockey player
- Lacey Heward, American para-alpine skier in 2002 Winter Paralympics
- Leslie Heward (1897–1943), English conductor and composer
- Noah Heward (born 2000), English rugby union player
- Percy W. Heward (1882–1946), English evangelist
- Prudence Heward (1896–1947), Canadian painter
- Stephen Heward (1777?–1828), public official in Upper Canada
- Tom Heward-Belle (born 1997), Australian footballer

== Other uses ==
- Heward (Greyhawk), a deity in the Greyhawk fictional universe
- Heward, Saskatchewan, a village
- Heward Grafftey (1928–2010), Canadian politician

== See also ==
- Hayward (disambiguation)
- Heyward
- Howard (surname)
