= David Howard =

David or Dave Howard may refer to:

== Entertainment ==
- David Howard (director) (1896–1941), American film director
- David Howard (photographer artist) (born 1952), experimental photographer

== Sports ==
- Dave Howard (second baseman) (1889–1956), played for Washington Senators, Tip-Tops
- David Howard (sailor) (1918–2023), Canadian Olympic sailor
- David Howard (linebacker) (born 1961), former American football linebacker
- David Howard (baseball) (born 1967), professional baseball player
- David Howard (defensive tackle) (born 1987), American football defensive tackle

== Other ==
- David Howard (poet) (born 1959), New Zealand poet and editor
- David Howard (ballet teacher) (1937–2013), British-American ballet instructor
- David Howard (Montana politician) (born 1946), Republican member of the Montana Legislature
- David Sanctuary Howard (1928–2005), expert on Chinese armorial porcelain
