= Ken Howard (disambiguation) =

Ken Howard (1944–2016) was an American actor

Ken or Kenneth Howard may also refer to:

- Ken Howard (artist) (1932–2022), British artist
- Kenny Howard (1929–1992), American artist
- Ken Howard (composer) (1939–2024), British composer
- Ken Howard (priest) (born 1952), American priest
- Kenneth Howard, 1st Earl of Effingham (1767–1845), British peer
- Kenneth Howard (cricketer) (1941–2006), English cricketer
- Kenneth S. Howard, American author of several books on chess problems
