= Lisa Howard =

Lisa Howard may refer to:

- Lisa Howard (news personality) (1926–1965), American actress and TV news anchor
- Lisa Howard (Canadian actress) (born 1963), performer in American TV and film
- Lisa Howard (American actress, born 1975), American Broadway singer, also in films and TV

== See also ==
- Elizabeth Howard (disambiguation)
