= Ben Howard (disambiguation) =

Ben Howard (born 1987) is a British singer-songwriter.

Ben Howard may also refer to:

- Ben Howard (aviator) (1904–1970), American aviator and aerospace engineer
- Ben Howard (poet) (born 1944), American poet, critic and essayist
- Ben Howard (baseball) (born 1979), American baseball player
- Ben Howard (rugby union) (born 1993), British rugby union player
- Ben Howard (actor), British television actor in Oh! What a Lovely War

== See also ==
- Benjamin Howard (disambiguation)
