= That Time I Joined the Circus =

Book by J. J. Howard

- First edition (publ. Harper)
- Author: J. J. Howard
- Language: English
- Publication date: 2012

That Time I Joined the Circus is a 2012 young adult novel set in the United States and written by J. J. Howard.

== Plot ==
That Time I Joined the Circus is about Xandra Ryan, or Lexi, who lives in New York city with her father Gavin, who unexpectedly dies, the same night she betrays one of her best friends. Once she realizes that her father left her with absolutely nothing, she is told by her dad's lawyer that she works for a traveling circus so she goes to Florida to find her mother that left her and her father. She takes a Greyhound bus to the location of the circus and ends up having an encounter with the owner of the circus, Louie, and realizes that her mother is not there. So knowing that she has nothing and can't go anywhere she accepts a job from Louie and starts her new life working at the novelties.

While getting a job at the circus wasn't what she had planned she made it her new life. As Lexi gets use to her jobs she meets new people that make her feel very welcome to their home. Her first day there, she had breakfast with the crew that she was going to be working with for the time being. She then meets Jamie who also works there and showed her around. Then he lets her into the circus rehearsal to see all the talented people who perform on a daily basis. She meets the daughters of Louie, Lina and Liska, and Lexi believed that they would be stereotypical teenagers but they welcomed her and invited her to go places with them and hang out with her and Lina invited her to live in her trailer so she does not have to live with the crew. Louie doesn't think she should be working on the crew anymore so he lets her add her talent into the circus. She claimed that she didn't really have a talent but then she remembered that she used to read tarot cards for her friends and the lady that use to do that had just left so she became the replacement. Lexi stopped reading cards and now her and Lina worked at the carnival game Go Fish. One night while they were working she got an unexpected visit from Eli her ex-best friend that she had left behind in New York. Seeing him made him so distraught that she fainted.

Now it was the holidays and they didn't have to work. She had asked Jamie if he could teach her how to drive a car. So with Lexi not knowing Jamie borrowed Eli's car. They drove for a long time and then stopped at a motel to stay in for the night. Jamie got a little Christmas tree for the hotel room and they decorated it together. That night they went to find Nick, Lexi's love at club that he works at. When they walk into the club they see a lady singing on the stage and Lexi realized that it was her mother. When they meet they talked and her mother apologized for what she did. After, they all went home to New York. She finished the school year and graduated. Lina invited her back to visit the circus to give her some new, she was getting married and she wanted her to be a bridesmaid. She also wanted her to be part of a tradition that they had at the circus. Where the crew does the circus show and the performers watch. Lexi did impersonations of the performers. When she went back home afterwards, her and Eli began dating. So she had to decide where she wanted to go to college. If she should stay with Eli or go where she wanted to go. She ended up staying in New York with Eli and they would see each other everyday after school.

== Reception ==
The book That Time I Joined the Circus has gotten very good reviews. Many have been about the setting of the book, the circus setting was a big hit. It is said to be "well-paced debut is a contemporary twist on the old fashioned notion of running away to join the circus," "the circus setting and carnival-esque atmosphere are among my favorite things about this book," "for any reader who ever has felt like running away to the circus." Another thing that was complimented in the reviews was the alternating chapters between the circus and the days before her father dies, "effectively builds suspense by alternating chapters between Lexi's gradual adaption to an itinerant life with the circus and the earlier days in New York leading to Gavin's death." But because it is a new book there is something that could always be improved, "title and cover art are okay and they do both encompass the story well enough," "I just don't see TTIJTC flying off my selves, the 'okay' packaging just does not do this book justice."

== Style ==
The style of the book is said to be "notably sarcastic but nonetheless charming attitude." The narration is described as "entertaining." It has a very circus feel when you read this book "you can almost hear the screams from the midway rides and taste that fluffy pink cotton candy."

== Background ==
Howard explains how "at first, it was homework," this book began as a school assignment for a class on novel writing. She says "the circus setting....was the biggest challenge," but to help her focus she had a "project playlist" to help her tune out the world. The novel was originally called "Reversed from the Very Beginning.

== Publication history ==
Howard explains how the publication process was very "long."
