= Leslie Howard (disambiguation) =

Leslie Howard (1893–1943) was an English stage performer who became star of Hollywood films during the 1930s.

Leslie Howard may also refer to:

- Leslie Howard (musician) (born 1948), Australian-born British pianist and composer
- Leslie Burr Howard (born 1956), American Olympic equestrian

== See also ==
- Howard (surname)
