= Dick Howard =

Dick Howard may refer to:

- A.E. Dick Howard (born 1933), American legal scholar
- Dick Howard (hurdler) (1935–1967), American hurdler
- Dick Howard (soccer) (born 1943), British-Canadian soccer player and coach

== See also ==
- Richard Howard (disambiguation)
