= Jane Howard =

Jane Howard may refer to:

- Jane Howard, Countess of Westmorland (1533–1593), English noblewoman
- Jane Howard, Duchess of Norfolk (1643–1693), English noblewoman
- Jane Howard (fl. 1920s), American classic female blues singer also (possibly) known as Miss Frankie.
- Elizabeth Jane Howard (1923–2014), British novelist
- Jane Howard (journalist) (1935–1996), American writer and journalist
- Jane Howard (Australian journalist), deputy chair of Writers SA, South Australia

== See also ==
- Jan Howard (1929–2020), American singer
