= Anne Howard =

Anne Howard or Ann Howard may refer to:

- Anne of York, Lady Howard (1475–1511), English princess; daughter of Edward IV
- Anne Howard, Countess of Oxford (c. 1497—c. 1558); daughter of Thomas Howard, 2nd Duke of Norfolk; married John de Vere, 14th Earl of Oxford
- Anne Howard, Countess of Arundel (1557–1630), English poet and religious conspirator
- Anne Howard, Countess of Effingham (1695–1774)
- Anne Howard, Viscountess Irwin (c. 1696–1764), poet
- Anne Howard (actress) (1925–1991), American actress
- Ann Howard (mezzo-soprano) (1934–2014), British opera singer
- Ann Howard (author) (born 1942), Australian author and journalist
- Ann Howard (golfer) (born 1934), English amateur golfer

== See also ==
- Anne Fitzalan-Howard, Duchess of Norfolk (1927–2013), British peeress
- Anna Howard (disambiguation)
- Anne Howard Bailey (1924–2006), writer
