= Arthur Howard (disambiguation) =

Arthur Howard (1910–1995) was a British film and television actor.

Arthur Howard may also refer to:

- Arthur Howard (English cricketer) (1882–1946), English cricketer active in 1921
- Arthur Howard (New Zealand cricketer) (1866–1951), New Zealand cricketer
- Arthur Howard (South African cricketer) (born 1936), South African cricketer active in 1961
- Arthur Howard (politician) (1896–1971), British Member of Parliament for Westminster St George's, 1945–1950
- Arthur Howard, American television actor; starred in Square One Television
- Arthur Howard, American artist; cover artist for Ginger Pye
- Arthur L. Howard (1846–1901), expert in early machine guns
- Arthur B. Howard (1838–1907), American horticulturalist
