= Sara Howard =

Sara Howard or Sarah Howard may refer to:

- Sara Howard (politician) (born 1981), senator in the Nebraska Legislature
- Sara Howard (speech therapist), British professor of clinical phonetics
- Sarah Howard, Countess of Suffolk (died 1776), formerly Sarah Inwen

== See also ==
- Howard (surname)
