= Benjamin Howard =

Benjamin Howard may refer to:

- Benjamin Howard (filmmaker), American filmmaker
- Benjamin Howard (Missouri politician) (1760–1814), American congressman from Kentucky and first governor of Missouri Territory
- Benjamin Chew Howard (1791–1872), American congressman from Maryland and fifth reporter of decisions of the United States Supreme Court

== See also ==
- Ben Howard (disambiguation)
- Benjamin Howard Baker, English athlete
