= Paul Howard =

Paul Howard may refer to:

- Paul Howard (writer) (born 1971), Irish journalist
- Paul Howard (baseball) (1884–1968), baseball player
- Paul Howard (illustrator) (born 1967), children's illustrator
- Paul Howard (American football) (1950–2020), football player
- Paul Howard (musician) (1895–1980), American jazz saxophonist and clarinetist
- Paul Howard (golfer) (born 1990), English golfer
- Paul Howard (artist curator) (born 1967), English artist curator
