= Marc Howard =

Marc Howard may refer to:

- Marc Howard (news anchor) (born 1937), retired Philadelphia news anchor
- Marc Morjé Howard, Professor of Government at Georgetown University, author and prison reformer

== See also ==
- Mark Howard (disambiguation)
