= Arthur Howard (New Zealand cricketer) =

New Zealand cricketer (1866–1951)

Personal information
- Full name: Arthur Harold Spowers Howard
- Born: 23 May 1866; Auckland, New Zealand
- Died: 26 March 1951 (aged 84); Auckland, New Zealand
- Batting: Right-handed

Domestic team information
- Years: Team
- 1895/96–1897/98: Wellington
- 1904/05–1905/06: Hawke's Bay
- Source: Cricinfo, 24 October 2020

Arthur Harold Spowers Howard (23 May 1866 – 26 March 1951) was a New Zealand cricketer. He played in seven first-class matches for Wellington and Hawke's Bay between the 1895–96 season and 1905–06.

Howard was born at Auckland in 1866, one of four sons and two daughters of Captain FW Howard, one of the earliest settlers of Auckland who had arrived in the city in the 1840s. He played cricket in the city for Auckland Cricket Club and worked for the post office.

In 1894 Howard was transferred to Wellington. He played club cricket in for Rival Cricket Club. By the 1895–96 season he was club captain and a member of the committee. He was the club's leading run scorer during the season and made his first-class debut for Wellington, playing in all four of the side's top-level matches, scoring 107 runs, including a half-century made against Canterbury on his representative debut. He played a further first-class match for Wellington in 1897–98 and after transferring to work at Napier, played two top-level matches for Hawke's Bay, one in each of the 1905–06 and 1906–07 seasons.

A further transfer to Wanganui, where he was the senior mail clerk, saw Howard captain Wanganui Cricket Club. By 1910 was the club's chairman and a delegate to the Wanganui Cricket association. In 1914 he was promoted to be chief mail clerk at Dunedin.

Howard died at Parnell in Auckland in 1951. He was aged 84.
