= Samuel Howard =

Samuel Howard may refer to:

- Samuel Howard (bishop) (born 1951), Episcopal bishop
- Samuel L. Howard (1891–1960), US Marine Corps general
- Samuel Howard (soccer) (born 1992), American soccer player
- Samuel Howard (surgeon) (1731–1811), English surgeon

== See also ==
- Shemp Howard (1895–1955), American comedian and actor
