= Bezaleel Howard =

- Born: November 22, 1753; Bridgewater, Massachusetts Bay Colony
- Died: January 20, 1837 (aged 83)
- Spouses: Lucinda Dwight (1785-1788); Prudence Williams
- Children: 5

Bezaleel Howard (November 22, 1753 – January 20, 1837) was an American Congregationalist minister.

== Life ==
Howard was born in Bridgewater, Massachusetts to Jane and farmer Nathan Howard. Bezaleel worked on the family farm until age 21.

He enrolled at Harvard in 1777, after about nine months of preparation. He graduated in 1781. Following this, he began studying theology under a Dr. Gay while teaching at a school in Hingham. From 1783 until 1785, he was a tutor at Harvard.

In 1784, he was invited to preach at First Church in Springfield, Massachusetts for six weeks. He was well-received, and in November 1784 they asked him to become their new pastor. He was ordained at the Springfield church on April 27, 1785.

In the late 1780s, Howard criticized both the insurgents of Shay's Rebellion and local authorities, whom he saw as abusing their power.

He resigned from First Church in September 1803, due to ill health. He was succeeded by Samuel Osgood.

In February 1808, Howard bought a home on Elm Street, where he lived until his death.

In 1809, Howard led a group of 18 other Springfield residents in raising money to purchase the freedom of a woman named Jenny, who had escaped from slavery in New York. Howard had officiated the wedding of Jenny and a freeman named Jack Williams several years prior, in 1802.

In 1819, Howard joined a splinter group of Unitarian congregation members in forming the new Third Congregational Society of Springfield, and remained with that church until his death.

He died in 1837 at the age of 83.

== Family ==
In December 1785, he married Lucinda Dwight (b. 1767), the daughter of a prominent congregation member. She died in March 1788, leaving Howard with a daughter. Two years after her death, he married Prudence Williams (d. 1853), from Wethersfield, Connecticut. The couple went on to have four children (three sons and one daughter), including John and Charles (b. 1794).

In 1802, Howard became the guardian of Mary Lyman following the death of her parents.

== Organizations and honors ==
In 1793, Howard co-directed a "select school for young ladies". He was also president of the Hampton Bible Society.

In 1818, Howard was elected to the American Academy of Arts and Sciences.

In 1824, he received the Doctor of Divinity degree from Harvard.

== Legacy ==
Howard Street in Springfield is named after Howard and his family.
