= Paul Howard (artist curator) =

English contemporary artist curator

- Born: January 1, 1967 (age 59); Brighton, Sussex, England
- Occupations: Artist, curator
- Years active: 1990s–present
- Known for: Contemporary art, curating
- Notable work: AquaVoltaic, Rush Hour, Restoration, Starship Enterprise
- Movement: Contemporary art

Paul Howard (born 1967, Brighton, Sussex, England) is an English contemporary artist curator.

Currently based in Sydney, Australia, and Visual Arts Curator at Blacktown Arts Centre. Recent projects include diaspora-making machines exhibition; It's Our Thing: More History on Australian Hip-Hop program curated with Kon Gouriotis and Maria Mitar; It's Timely touring exhibition curated with Gary Carsley; Riverstones and Ramifications: Bronwyn Bancroft; Stitching the Sea exhibition curated with Karen Ruki; UNCOVERED: Hidden Pleasure of the Day exhibition; and Native Institute exhibition curated with Brook Andrew.

AquaVoltaic is an international touring exhibition created with David Matthews. The Australian version was exhibited with the latest episode at The Lock-Up contemporary arts space in 2015. In the UK the exhibition toured with additional episodes created for each venue installation: B-Side Festival 2012 Cultural Olympiad; Metal Liverpool; and Metal Southend. The project was produced with artist curator Simon Poulter. AquaVoltaic is a commentary on the commercial use and abuse of water, and a satire of globalisation and popular media. After buying a consignment of water from a shady Nigerian in Sierra Leone, quixotic Afro-Caribbean businessman John Jay-Jay Joseph attempts to smuggle his booty through Essex and London to Outback Australia, where he intends to sell it to a mysterious Aboriginal tribe with magical realist ambitions. But when Jay-Jay's bizarre plans go awry, the transaction between him and the other ethnics unravels a darkly comic tale that raises questions about racial stereotyping, global trade, and the mutating qualities of water.

Rush Hour was a UK national touring exhibition in 2007 to coincide with the 200 year anniversary of the Abolition of the Transatlantic Slave Trade Act in the British Empire, created with David Matthews. The picture was shot as a single-take in Siaka Stevens Street in Freetown and the soundtrack recorded at the Sierra Leone State Television Studios with the street theatre group, The Freetong Players. Rush Hour was shown at HPF2011 and in 2010 at the inaugural exhibition entitled 'Plug-In' at MAC (Midlands Arts Centre). Curator Simon Poulter commented: "Rush Hour gives the exhibition a true sense of globalisation at work. A single tracking shot courses through a static crowd in Freetown, Sierra Leone. The film beautifully encapsulates Marshall McLuhan's idea of the global village, where we see western influences alongside truly local culture."

Other notable works include Starship Enterprise, a seven-minute animation and limited edition print, and Restoration, a five-minute animation and limited edition print, exhibited at Whitechapel Art Gallery, London, Ormeau Baths Gallery, Belfast, Substation, Singapore and Muse London, from 2005 to 2007.

The Museum of London Docklands permanent exhibition, London, Sugar and Slavery, reveals how London's involvement in slavery has shaped the capital since the 17th century, and challenges perceptions about the transatlantic slave trade. Paul Howard's commission for the permanent gallery is a contemporised portrait of the son of a slave, revolutionary and abolitionist, Robert Wedderburn, and is based on the museum's painting of the first chairman of the West India Dock Company and slave owner Sir George Hibbert. Lloyd Gordon as Robert Wedderburn was reviewed in The Guardian and The Independent.

Paul Howard was Curator at Tate Modern from 2003 to 2008. He led the UK national collections initiative across the Tate galleries in London, Liverpool and St Ives, from 2003 to 2006, and led the pan-European programme of modern and contemporary art with the Irish Museum of Modern Art, Dublin, Serralves Museum, Porto, Museum of Contemporary Art, Zagreb, National Gallery of Modern Art, Prague, Centre of Contemporary Art, Warsaw and the Pinokotek Moderne, Munich from 2006 to 2008.
