= Richard Howard (disambiguation) =

Richard Howard (1929−2022) was an American writer, literary critic, and translator.

Richard Howard may also refer to:

- Richard Howard, 4th Earl of Effingham (1748−1816), British peer and member of the House of Lords
- Richard Howard (actor) (1944–2024), British actor
- Richard Howard (priest) (1884−1981), Anglican Provost of Coventry
- Richard A. Howard (1917−2003), American botanist
- Richard C. Howard, former mayor of Malden
- Richard Howard (NASCAR owner), former NASCAR race car owner
- Richard Watson Howard (1896−1918), World War I flying ace
- Richard P. Howard, historian emeritus of Community of Christ
- Richard Baron Howard (1807–1848), English physician

== See also ==
- Dick Howard (disambiguation)
