= Ken Howard (priest) =

American religious leader

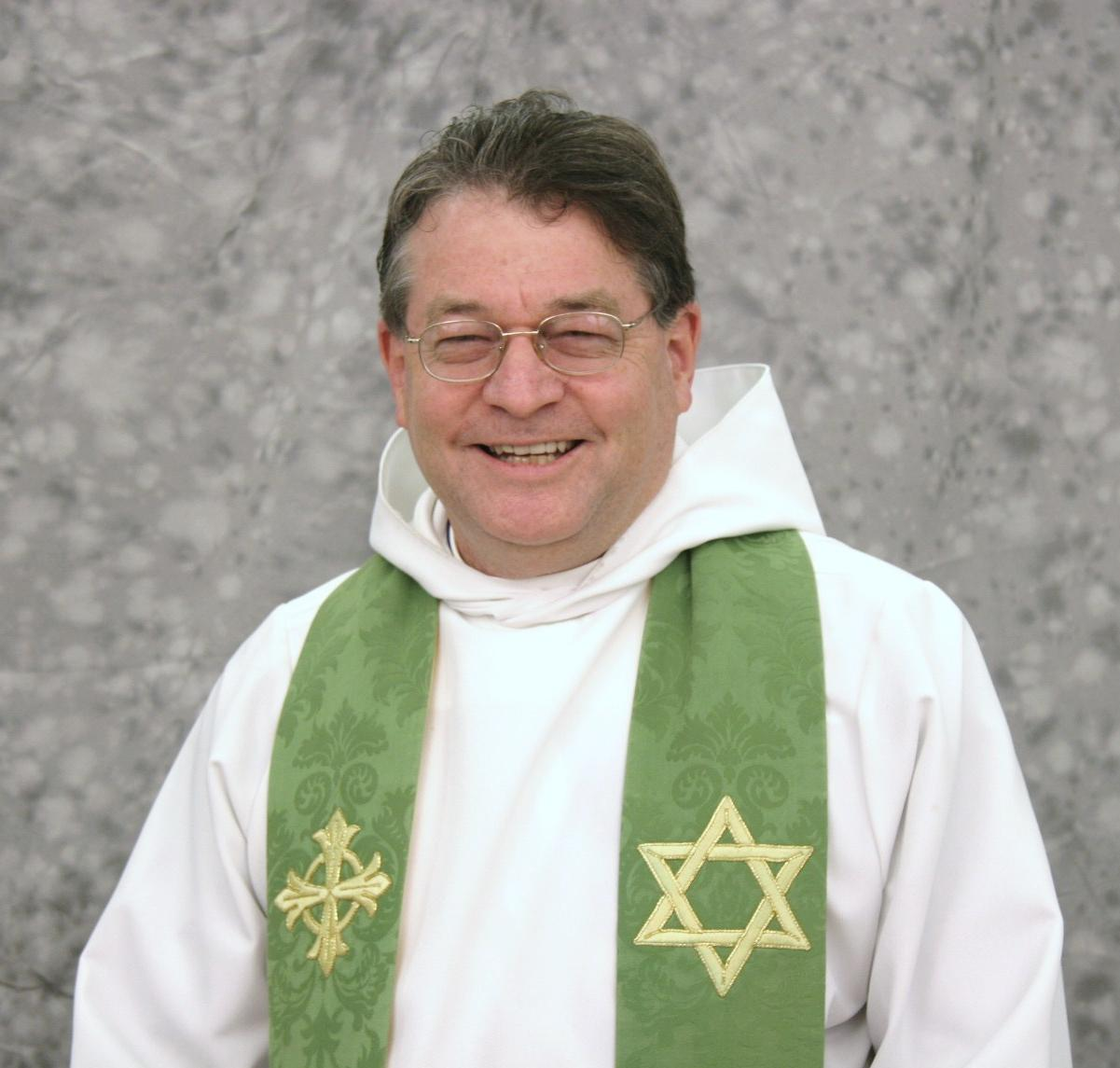
- Portrait of Ken Howard, wearing a stole featuring both Christian and Jewish symbols (taken 2012).
- Born: Kenneth Wayne Howard; September 19, 1952 (age 73); Texas
- Education: Virginia Theological Seminary
- Occupations: Faith leader, author, religion demographer, consultant, nonprofit executive

Kenneth W. Howard (born September 19, 1952) is an American faith leader, author, religion demographer, consultant, and nonprofit executive – currently executive director of The FaithX Project.

== Early life and career ==
Born in Lubbock, Texas, Howard is the son of a Jewish mother and a gentile father, the grandson of Russian immigrants, and the great-grandson of the town rabbi of Mogilev, Belarus. In his early 20s he became a follower of Jesus and helped start a Messianic Jewish synagogue. Eventually, he joined The Episcopal Church because it was "the most Jewish church [he] could find."

Public Sector (1974–1989): Howard worked in the public behavior health and developmental services field in the Commonwealth of Virginia, from 1974 to 1981 for local community services boards, first as a volunteerism director, then as a community organizer, and from 1981 to 1989 as director of training and development for the Virginia Department of Behavioral Health and Developmental Services.

Private Consulting Practice (1978–1993): In 1989, Howard started a consulting practice focusing on management development, rightsizing, team building, and board management for both private, public, and nonprofit sector organizations. He maintained this practice through his graduation from seminary in 1993.

== Ordained ministry ==
Seminary (1990–1993): Studied at Virginia Theological Seminary in Alexandria, Virginia, focusing on church history and biblical languages, and including international study in Biblical archeology at St. George's College, Jerusalem in Israel. Assisted in redesigning in the Introduction to the New Testament curriculum. Graduated in 1993 with honors in Church history for his research into the Jewish origins of early Christianity, published in Jewish Christianity in the Early Church.

Ordination (1993): Ordained as a deacon, then as a priest in the Episcopal Church in the Diocese of Washington.

Parish Ministry (1993–2016): Served as assistant rector at the Episcopal Church of the Ascension in Gaithersburg, Maryland from 1993 to 1995, focusing on leadership development, spiritual formation, and stewardship.

Left in 1995 to start a new congregation, St. Nicholas Church in Germantown, Maryland, the first successful new church start in the Diocese of Washington in over 40 years. By the time he left in 2016, the congregation had experienced more than ten-fold growth, purchased property for its eventual campus, and constructed its first multipurpose worship and gathering center.

Faith-Based Nonprofit Ministry (2016–present): Howard stepped down from parish ministry in 2016 to start The FaithX Project, a 501(c)3 nonprofit consulting, research, and resource development practice, the mission of which is to help congregations survive and thrive in challenging times through data-grounded discernment, vision-guided experimentation, and strategic mission planning. FaithX serves faith leaders and faith communities in all denominations and faith traditions. FaithX was instrumental in developing tools to assess congregational vitality and sustainability, and applying GIS demographics, analytics, and market segmentation to congregational, judicatory, and denominational planning. These include:

- Congregational Vitality Assessment (CVA) – A 65-question, research-based congregational vitality inventory, developed by Howard and FaithX and brought online through a partnership with the Episcopal Church Foundation.
- CVA Judicatory Platform – A customized dashboard through which a judicatory can directly administer the CVA to each of its congregations, receive anonymized results, and monitor their results over time.
- MapDash for Faith Communities – An online, interactive demographic and analytic platform for congregations and judicatories. Howard served as subject matter expert and beta test coordinator for Datastory (the GIS company he worked with to develop it).

Paradoxy (2010): In 2010, Howard authored the book Paradoxy: Creating Christian Community Beyond Us and Them, the premise of which is to help congregations "transcend dead-end divisions and transform conflict into healthy diversity united by the love of Christ and the power of the Holy Spirit". Notable critical reviews of the book include the following:

- Phyllis Tickle, a leader in the Emerging Christianity movement, called Paradoxy "one of the clearest and most concise commentaries presently available about where the Church may reasonably be seen as going in this time of paradigmatic shift."
- Brian McLaren wrote in the book's foreword, "Ken Howard does what good leaders do in times of change and challenge. First, he describes where we are. Then he tells the story of how we got here. Then he gives us a vision of where to go from here [...] he simplifies without oversimplifying complex historical and philosophical developments."

The Religion Singularity: A ground-breaking research paper a demographic crisis the is destabilizing and transforming institutional Christianity.

== Education ==
- 2007 – Yale University School of Theology, New Haven, CT: Emergent Theology Colloquium (Miroslav Volf).
- 2005 – Cambridge University, Cambridge, UK: Visiting Scholar on the history of the Early Church and Celtic Christianity.
- 1993 – Virginia Theological Seminary, Alexandria, VA: Master of Divinity with honors in Church History.
- 1989 – Virginia Commonwealth University, Richmond, VA: Master of Education, specializing in Human Resources Development.
- 1979 – Old Dominion University, Norfolk, VA: Bachelor of Science in Interdisciplinary Studies (Education and Psychology).

== Associations, Elections, and Appointments ==
- 2017–present: International Positive Psychology Association – Work and Meaning SIG (chair 2017–2018)
- 1993–present: Episcopal Diocese of Washington – Elected/appointed positions include: Task for Common Ground Dialogue on Human Sexuality (chair), Diocesan Council (executive committee), General Convention Delegate (alternate), Bishop's pastoral representative to troubled congregations, Bishop's Working Group on Mission Canons (chair), Bishop's Working Group on Episcopal-Jewish Relations (co-chair), Ecclesiastical Trial Court (member).
- 2008–2015: Washington Episcopal Clergy Association – Elected positions include: Board Member, Vice President, Secretary, Communications Director, Program Chair.

== Affiliations ==
- Episcopal Diocese of Washington – Howard serves as executive director of FaithX under an extension of ministry from the Diocese.
- Datastory – Howard acts as Subject Matter Expert (SME) and FaithX has an affiliate relation.
- Esri – FaithX is an Esri Partner organization.

== Books ==
- "Paradoxy: Creating Christian Community Beyond Us and Them." Published by The FaithX Project (2016, 2nd Edition). ISBN 1557257752, ISBN 978-1557257758.
- "Excommunicating the Faithful: Jewish Christianity in the Early Church." Published by The FaithX Project (3rd Edition, 2013).

== Publications ==
- "Grounding Discernment in Data: Strategic Missional Planning Using GIS Technology and Market Segmentation Data," Socio-Historical Exploration of Religion and Ministry (2019), 1(2).
- "The Religion Singularity: The Religion Singularity: A Demographic Crisis Destabilizing and Transforming Institutional Christianity," International Journal of Religion and Spirituality in Society (2017)
- "A New Middle Way? Surviving and Thriving in the Coming Religious Realignment," Anglican Theological Review (Winter 2009/2010)
- "A Comprehensive Expectancy Motivation Model: Implications for Adult Education and Training," Adult Education Quarterly (May 1989).
