= Church of the Unity =

Historic church building in Springfield, Massachusetts

- Third Congregational Society
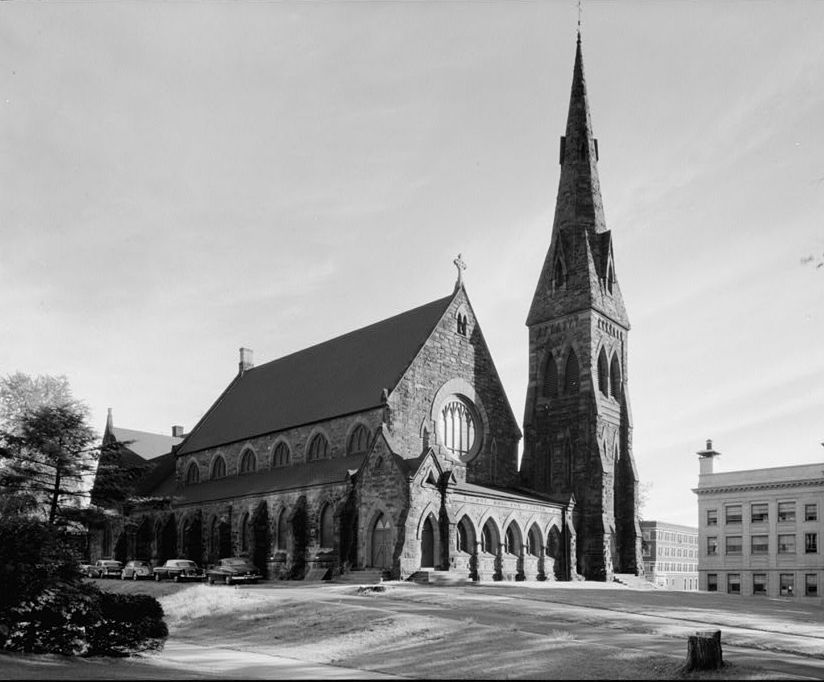
- Church of the Unity
- 42.1030°N 72.5840°W
- Address: 207 State Street, Springfield, Massachusetts, United States
- Denomination: Unitarianism

Architecture
- Years built: 1866–1869
- Demolished: 1961

The Church of the Unity was a church building designed by H. H. Richardson and built in Springfield, Massachusetts in 1866. It housed the Third Congregational Society, a Unitarian congregation founded in 1819 (although they were referred to as the Church of the Unity during their residence in the building). It was demolished in 1961.

== Description ==
The church, built in the Gothic style, was Richardson's first commissioned work. It had no transepts or western portal, but it did have a tower and spire on its southwest corner. The pulpit was on the east end of the building, and was flanked by choir and organ lofts. The building's windows were acutely pointed, and its ceiling was wooden coffered. The stone for the project was sourced from Longmeadow.

Its design was praised in contemporary articles in the Springfield Republican. The design of the church influenced other local architects, including the builders of West Springfield's First Congregational Church in the 1870s.

== History ==
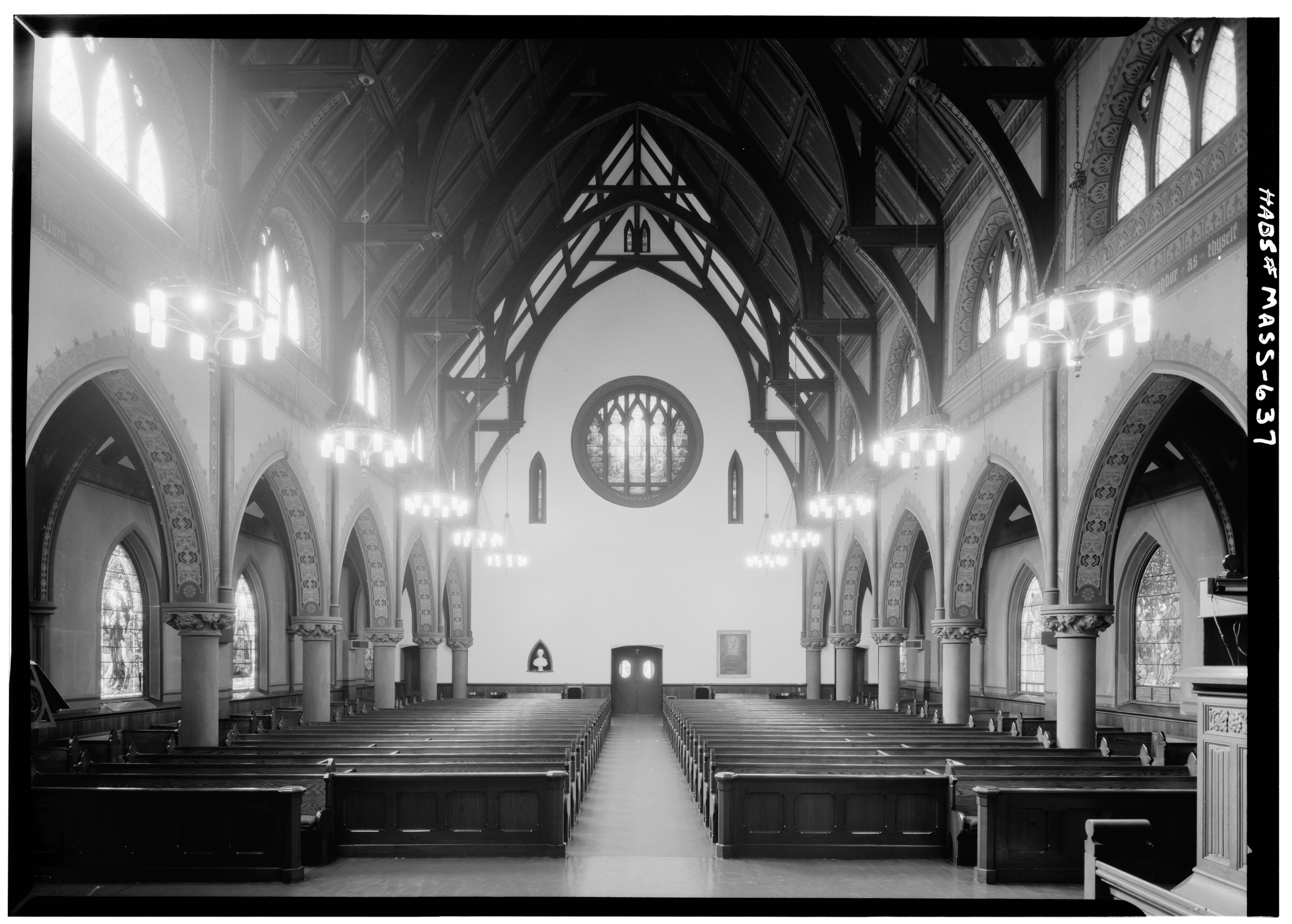
1959 photograph of the inside of the Church of the Unity

The building began construction in November 1866 and was completed in February 1869. An organ was bought for the completed church from a Boston company.

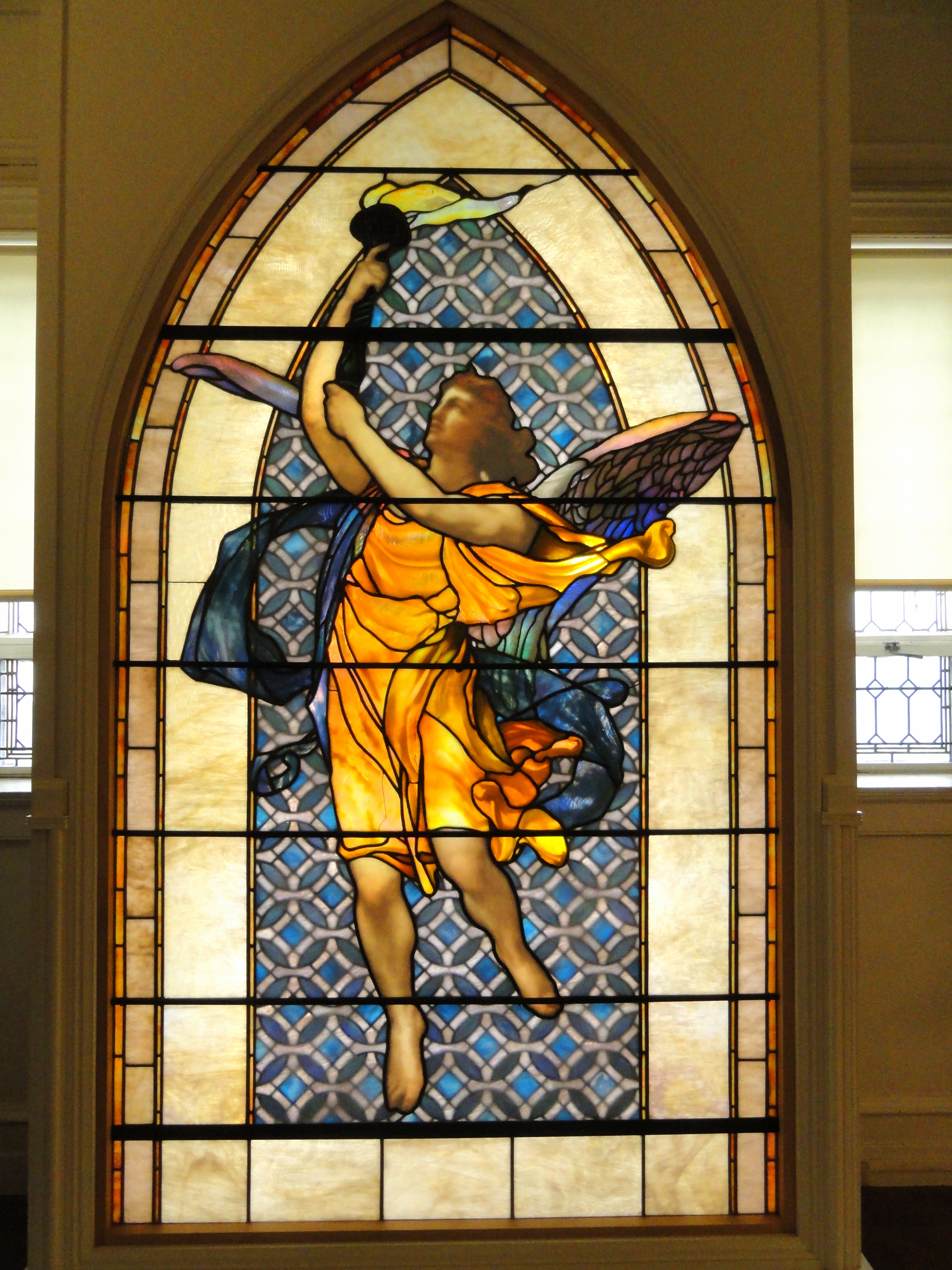
The Lightbearer at Springfield's George Walter Vincent Smith Art Museum in 2012

Beginning in the 1890s, stained glass windows were donated to the Church as memorials to fill the dozen apertures on the sides of the sanctuary. Several of these were Tiffany glass. One of these windows, "The Lightbearer", was designed in 1894 by Edward Simmons, the son of church minister George Frederick Simmons. It was donated to the George Vincent Walter Smith museum after the church's closure.

In 1928 St. Paul's Universalist Church merged with Church of the Unity, making the church Unitarian Universalist.

In 1935 the church acquired a new organ.

In 1959 the congregation voted to relocate from their original building to a new location near Forest Park. The organ was relocated as well, but all but one of the church's stained glass windows were sold; the last one is displayed in the congregation's successor church.

It was demolished in 1961, with plans to build apartments on the site. This never came to pass, and as of 2023 the location is a parking lot across from the Springfield City Library.
