= Donald Howard =

Donald Howard may refer to:

- Donald Howard, 3rd Baron Strathcona and Mount Royal (1891–1959), British politician
- Donald Howard (priest) (1927–2007), Anglican priest
- Donald L. Howard, American jockey
- Donald R. Howard (1927–1987, Donald Roy Howard), American academic and author
- Donald Ray Howard (1933–2013), American educator and author
