= Charles Howard (cricketer, born 1823) =

English cricketer

Charles William Howard (1823 – 10 September 1908) was an English cricketer who played in one first-class cricket match for Kent County Cricket Club in 1844. He was born and died in Bridge near Canterbury in Kent.

Howard married twice, had 12 children and worked as a Veterinary surgeon in Bridge.

== Bibliography ==
- Carlaw, Derek (2020). Kent County Cricketers, A to Z: Part One (1806–1914) (PDF). Cardiff: ACS.
