= Anna Howard =

Anna Howard may refer to:

- Anna Howard (cinematographer)
- Anna Howard (politician)
- Anna Howard Shaw (1847–1919), suffragette

== See also ==
- Anne Howard (disambiguation)
