= Kenneth Howard (cricketer) =

English cricketer (1941–2006)

Kenneth Henry Howard (2 June 1941 – 9 August 2006) was an English cricketer active from 1958 to 1966 who played for Lancashire. He was born in Manchester. He appeared in 61 first-class matches as a lefthanded batsman who bowled right arm off break. He scored 395 runs with a highest score of 23 and held 57 catches. He took 104 wickets with a best analysis of seven for 53. Howard died in Manchester on 9 August 2006, at the age of 65.
