= James Howard (soldier) =

American Union soldier

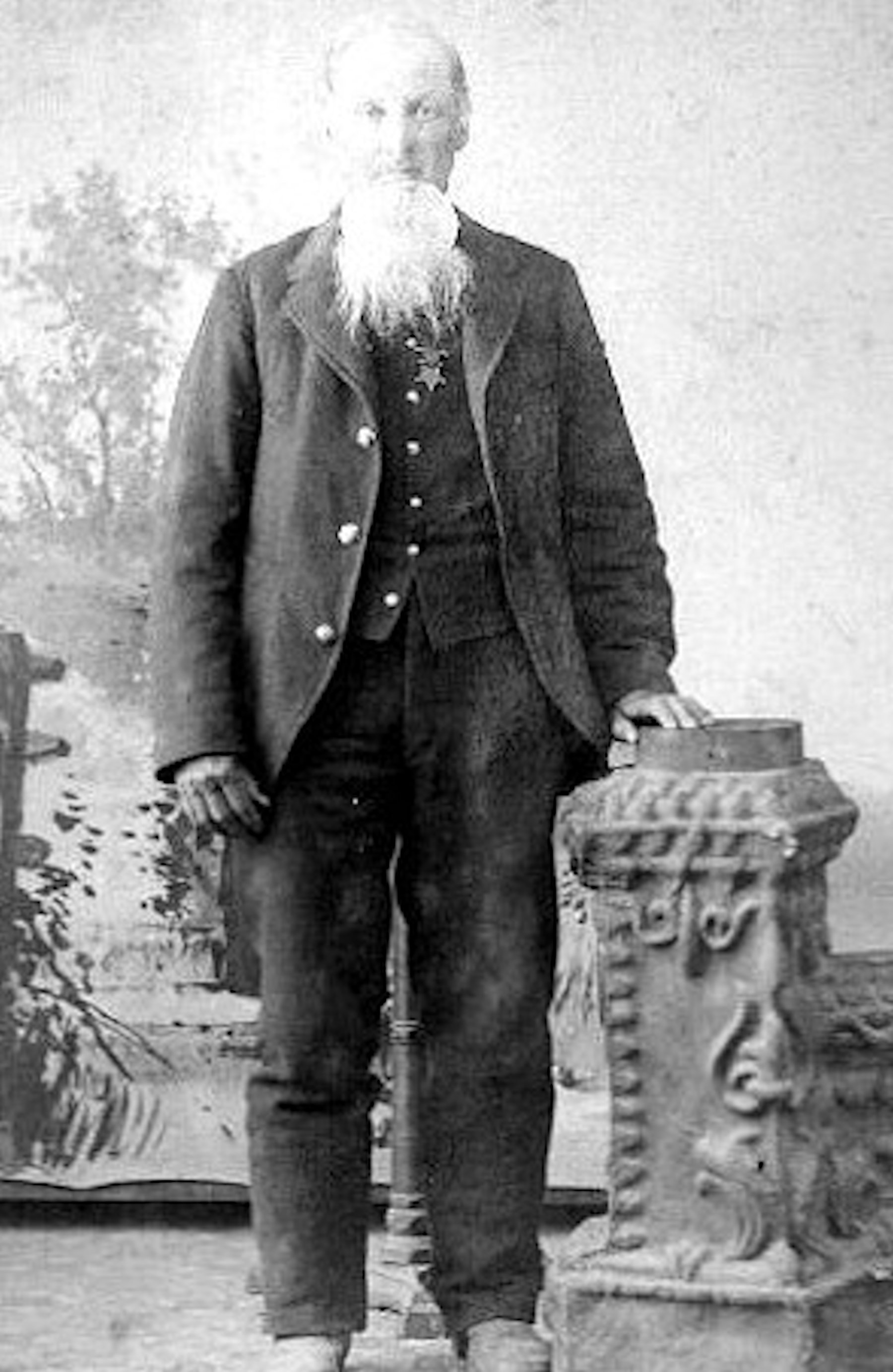
Howard, James c1879 GAR MoH public domain image

James Howard (November, 1842 - November 8, 1879) was an American soldier and Medal of Honor recipient.

== Biography ==
Howard was born in Newton, New Jersey. He served in the Union Army as a Sergeant in Company K of the 158th New York Volunteer Infantry Regiment during the American Civil War. Howard earned his medal in action at Battery Gregg during the Third Battle of Petersburg, Virginia on April 2, 1865. He received his medal on May 12, 1865. He died on November 8, 1879, in Fort McKavett, Texas and is now buried in San Antonio National Cemetery, Texas.

== Medal of Honor Citation ==
Howard had carried the colors in advance of the line of battle, the flagstaff being subsequently shot off while he was planting it on the parapet of the fort.
