= Maurice Howard =

British art historian

Maurice Howard OBE (b. 16 June 1948) is a British art historian, and was Professor of History of Art at the University of Sussex until his retirement in 2016.

Howard has a bachelor's degree in history from Christ's College, Cambridge, followed by MA and PhD degrees in history of art from the Courtauld Institute of Art, London.

He was director of the Society of Antiquaries of London from 2007 to 2010, and its president from 2010 to 2014.

In 2016, he was appointed an Officer of the Order of the British Empire (OBE) for services to higher education and architectural heritage.

== Major publications ==
- The Buildings of Elizabethan and Jacobean England (Yale, 2007)
- The Early Tudor Country House: Architecture and Politics, 1490–1550 (George Philip: London, 1987)
