= Percy W. Heward =

- Born: 13 December 1882; Hackney, London, England
- Died: 6 May 1948 (aged 65)
- Website: www.heshallcome.com student-thoughts.com

Percy Weston Heward (13 December 1882 – 6 May 1948) was an independent English Christian evangelist, Biblical scholar, author and principal of a "Bible Training College" in London. In 1908 he founded a movement which aimed to "literally carry out the word of the Gospel" and re-establish Churches/Assemblies according to the New Testament pattern. He became the leading teacher of a gathering of Christians in Forest Gate, East London, which was in association with a number of other similar assemblies in England.

== Life ==
Heward was born in Hackney (parish) (today London Borough of Hackney), England on 13 December 1882 and was "raised in a godly home" by his parents John Reeves Heward and Sarah Ann Heward. They were married in "Clapton Park Congregational Chapel" on 10 January 1878. He was converted at the age of 4, "trusting [Jesus Christ] as his personal Saviour". His parents, who "had a deep spiritual interest in fellow-believers and held meetings in their own home", taught him according to their understanding of the Bible. His tutors at St Olave's Grammar School, Southwark, London "desired him to follow a scholastic profession" because of his "very successful career" at school. He refused. His parents "had dedicated him to the service of the Lord Jesus Christ" and so his education was centred on the Bible and languages. Later the American missionary S.C. Duce wrote: "He seemed to enter into the very warp and woof of the Scriptures and his deep knowledge of the Hebrew and Greek languages made him an authority on questions of interpretation. A learned Hebrew Christian in the United States once remarked to the writer that Mr. Heward was the most deeply instructed student of the Scriptures in the original languages he had met on either side of the Atlantic".

"Straight from school he entered into Christian service", began to issue his magazines and then "instituted courses of Bible study amongst men". "In June 1901 'The Young Men's Bible Study and Training Association' was begun with Mr. Heward as 'General Secretary'." In 1903 a "Bible Training College" (B.T.C.) on an interdenominational basis was established, which moved in 1904 into No. 68 Fleet Street, London. Although he was now only 21 years of age, "the work of the college was under his supervision as principal, his father and many friends helping". "His work of overseeing the B.T.C., and taking a large share of the lectures (others also lectured for the B.T.C., e.g. Mr. Archibald Brown, pastor of East London Tabernacle; Mr. Marcus Bergman, Hebrew Christian worker with the London City Mission; Mr. E. Bendor Samuel, Mr. Bloxsidge, Mr. J. Neil, Mr. Wilkinson of the Mildmay Mission to the Jews), necessitated constant study of Holy Scriptures". From his study of the Scripture he realized in 1906:

"There is a need for more and more simplicity and a return to Scriptural arrangements, so that some of the grander developments proposed must be put aside and others delayed till the basis thereof (a local Christian church to which they can be attached on right lines) are organized". And in March 1907 he wrote: "The idea of our "Bible Training College", as an organization, apart from any church after God's appointment, and training preachers for varied connexions, failed to stand God's test." Putting his teaching into practice, he had in 1906 shut the college down while inviting those "who had joined in the work to take an assembly (or church) position. Some continued with him, and some did not, but whatever choice they made, they did not cease to regard [Percy Heward] with respect. Thenceforward the work proceeded on lines conceived by him to be in accord with God's revealed will for this present age."

The work under his direction was characterized by strong evangelistic efforts locally in Forest Gate and beyond, "sound doctrine" followed by godly practice and an increasing literature ministry maintained on a basis of faith. Several missionary journeys (e.g. 4 March – 25 May 1935) to countries such as Poland, Belgium, Netherlands, Germany, France, Austria, Switzerland, Luxembourg, Latvia and Czechoslovakia were undertaken and international connections to Christian workers and fellowships (e.g. in South America, Germany and United States) marked his latter life.

He remained unmarried to the end of his life and after contracting pneumonia he died suddenly at the age of 65 on 6 May 1948 in London, shortly after returning from his last missionary journey to Germany, where he had stayed for about one month. A crowd of about 150 Christians assembled at his funeral in Ilford on 13 May 1948.

== Teaching ==
From 1902 to 1904 Heward had published his magazine "The Puritan Quarterly". Together with his own writings it contained "contributions from modern Puritans, such as Jonathan Ranken Anderson". The strong influence of his devout parents, his "great love for the writings of the Puritans", hints of Christian friends and especially his own studies of the Scriptures in Hebrew and Greek gradually led him to the conviction that many customs, traditions and teachings amongst the Christians of his time were not to be found in the Bible, but originated from man. His life-long ministry amongst Christians was characterized by standing against what he saw to be error and by his fervent pleas to return to the doctrine of the Holy Scriptures. However, Heward was marked by a readiness to learn from other Christians if the matter in question could be proven by Scripture. A learning process in his magazines is clearly visible. Many of his sermons, preached either to the congregation in the "Meeting room" in Forest Gate (East London) or in other places, were transcribed as he spoke and were published as Typewritten Notes and are still available. S.J. Duce wrote in his short biography about his perceived characteristics of Heward's teaching: "I was attracted by some of his writings which came into my hands (Duce did not know him at this time) and particularly with the emphasis put upon the finished work of Christ for the redemption of the sinner and the complete efficacy of His grace". Apart from his emphasis on the sovereignty of God and on "absolute inspiration" of Scripture, Heward's own words in 1917 show revealing aspects of his theological views: "Alas, God's greatness, His holiness, and His righteous wrath against sin, are not emphasized in these perilous times. Neither is the utter depravity of man believed, though the Holy Scriptures set this forth throughout. Hence there is little, or no sense of the dreadfulness of sin [...]. Consequently the work of Christ is not appreciated, as it should be [...]. We have become accustomed to think lightly about God [...]."

== Evangelistic zeal ==
His ministry, however, was not restricted to believers. "The Gospel of the grace of God" was his motive for open-air preaching in various locations in London (e.g. in Jewish streets, Hyde Park) and abroad, for "a quiet word to his fellow passengers in a bus or on the subway", for leaflet distribution on race courses (Epsom, Ascot), and for regular visits to the London docks, to which he held a pass. Unusually gifted with languages, he was able to spread the Gospel message not only to immigrants (e.g. "Chinese in their gambling dens", "Arab bar tenders"), but also in the ports of Cardiff, Liverpool and London amongst the seamen of many nations, either by word or by a leaflet in their particular language. A short message to the assembled crew of a foreign vessel was not unusual in his outreach activities. Hospitals and sick individuals were visited, and during the two wars, [Heward] was allowed access to some of the camps, including those where there were prisoners of war. On Tuesdays he held a mid-week meeting in the "John Pearce Restaurant", Aldgate, where he taught Greek and Hebrew. As a result of these endeavours he had to deal with a worldwide correspondence. Duce wrote about him: "Most of his Gospel preaching and ministry was in England but he also made visits to the countries of Europe in the service of the Lord and he reached the far corners of the earth by his tracts and correspondence."

== Writings ==
His writing ministry was strikingly similar to that of Arthur Pink, Heward's contemporary and Christian friend. They held very similar theological views on many issues. Pink quoted Heward in his literature, corresponded with Heward, and used to come down from Stornoway, Scotland, for fellowship in "special meetings at Holiday seasons, announced as 'Quiet Bible Hours'" in the "Meeting room" in East London. Like Pink, Percy Heward had both the ministry of letter writing and writing in exposition of the Scriptures in a magazine. The Student of Scripture (similar to Pink's Studies in the Scriptures) was Heward's second monthly magazine for more advanced Christians. It contained expositions and studies and was published by him from January 1904 until March 1948. The more readable magazine from his pen for a wider audience was called Thoughts from the Word of God, published by Heward from 15 August 1898, at the age of 16, until his death in 1948. Both were monthly magazines and reached 10.000 copies each. His August 1900 issue of Thoughts had in total 4000 copies and included some statements of contemporary Christians:

- "Your "Thoughts from the Word of God" are full of excellent matter." – J.C. Ryle
- "The good matter which you present." – W.Y. Fullerton
- "In its earnest, evangelical, and Scriptural tone I rejoice." – William Fuller Gooch
- "I am delighted with your magazine. May the blessing of the Lord rest upon it abundantly." – James Sprunt

His expository books God's letters to His Church and God manifest in the flesh were published in 1904 and were followed by The Deity of Christ and others. A series of expositions of all parables in the New Testament were produced in one volume under the name of The Parables of the Lord Jesus. Throughout his life he authored a vast number of tracts and booklets about very different subjects. He also published an irregular magazine with gospel-related articles, called A Testimony of the Truth, in various languages like French, German, Japanese, Spanish, Portuguese, Dutch, Greek, Yiddish, Russian, Chinese, Italian, Bengali, and Norwegian.

He wrote hundreds of poems, published the Gospel leaflet Come; For All Things Are Now Ready in "over 20 languages" and sent regular letters to many different lands; e.g. a missionary in Lebanon received "in all about 150 letters from him over a period of about eight years and these have been read and re-read many times with much refreshment of soul". Although Heward's many letters are mainly lost and have never been collected with the purpose of printing, his two main magazines are well preserved in bound volumes. A numerous collection of his writings is to be found in The University of Manchester Library, England, a smaller collection is in the Evangelical Library in London and books of his are in other libraries around the world.

By 1915, Heward began distributing his literature free of charge. This move was based on his understanding of Matthew 10:8 and so since 1915 his writings have no longer been on sale. As a result of this unusual policy, Heward has become virtually unknown among evangelical Christians. However, since his death parts of his written legacy have been republished, translated into different languages and distributed without charge.

== Biography ==
- Some Brief Memories by S. J. Duce
- A Reminiscence by S. C. Bown
- A Further Record of His Sufficiency by P. W. Heward
- The Story of a Magazine by S. C. Bown
- Forty Years by S. C. Bown
- Fifty Years by S. C. Bown
