= Philip Howard =

Philip Howard may refer to:

- Philip Howard, 13th Earl of Arundel (1557–1595), English nobleman and saint
- Philip Howard (1629–1717), English army officer and Member of Parliament
- Philip Howard (died 1686) (c. 1631–1686), English soldier and politician
- Philip Howard (1669–1711), English Member of Parliament for Morpeth and Carlisle
- Philip Howard (cardinal) (1629–1694), English Roman Catholic cardinal
- Philip Howard (journalist) (1933-2014), British journalist
- Philip Howard (pianist) (born 1976), British pianist and composer
- Philip Howard (Whig politician) (1801–1883), Member of Parliament for Carlisle
- Philip K. Howard (born 1948), American author and lawyer
- Philip N. Howard (born 1970), Canadian author and Oxford professor
- Phil Howard (musician), Australian jazz drummer
- Phil Howard (chef), British chef, chef patron, and restaurateur
