= Howard C. Thomas =

British academic

- Born: July 31, 1945 (age 81)
- Education: Newcastle University; University of Glasgow
- Awards: British Society of Gastroenterology's Research Medal (1984)
- Scientific career
- Fields: Hepatology
- Workplaces: Imperial College London

Howard C. Thomas is a British hepatologist and academic. He is Emeritus Professor of Hepatology at Imperial College London, known for his research on viral hepatitis, liver immunology, and antiviral therapies. Thomas chaired national advisory groups on hepatitis for the UK Department of Health, led clinical trials of interferon therapy, and was founding editor of the Journal of Viral Hepatitis. He has received multiple international awards and delivered named lectures including the Humphry Davy Rolleston, Hans Popper, and Sheila Sherlock lectures. He was elected a Fellow of the Academy of Medical Sciences in 1999.

== Early life and education ==
Thomas studied at Newcastle University, where he received a BSc in Physiology and MB BS in Medicine with honours, and was awarded the Phillipson Prize. He gained a PhD in Medicine from the University of Glasgow in 1974 with a thesis on liver immunology. Following his PhD, he became a Lecturer and Wellcome Senior Clinical Research Fellow at the Royal Free Hospital.

== Academic and clinical roles ==
From 1974 to 1987, Thomas held a Wellcome Senior Clinical Research Fellowship and then became Professor of Medicine under Dame Sheila Sherlock at the Royal Free Hospital Medical School. In 1987, he moved to St Mary's Hospital Medical School as Professor of Medicine and Chair of the Academic Department, serving as Vice Chairman of Imperial's Division of Medicine (1997–2004) and Clinical Dean of the Faculty of Medicine (2001–2004). He practised clinically as Consultant Physician and Hepatologist at St Mary's Hospital until 2011, after which he became Emeritus Professor of Hepatology.

== Advisory and leadership roles ==
Thomas has served as an advisor to the UK Department of Health, including as Chair of the Advisory Group on Hepatitis and the NICE group on treatment of chronic hepatitis B. He has also contributed to committees on infected health care personnel, vaccination policy, and national strategies for blood-borne viruses. Internationally, he participated in expert groups convened by the World Health Organization on hepatocellular carcinoma and hepatitis and reviewed the medical school of the University of Mauritius.

== Research and contributions ==
- Studies on oral tolerance to protein antigens and immunological effects of liver injury.
- Hepatitis B vaccine development: Thomas co‑authored a study demonstrating neutralization of hepatitis B virus infectivity using a murine monoclonal antibody, contributing to early vaccine research and diagnostics.
- Identification of molecular variants of hepatitis B, including e antigen-negative and vaccine escape mutants.
- Discovery of hepatitis C virus infection of the brain and its association with cognitive impairment ("brain fog").
- Epidemiological studies on increasing incidence of cholangiocarcinoma in the UK.
- Interferon-alpha trials for chronic viral hepatitis, including a controlled trial in chronic hepatitis B (Hepatology, 1985) and a randomized trial in chronic hepatitis C (BMJ, 1989).
- Genetic studies linking host factors to viral hepatitis and alcohol-related liver disease, including susceptibility to hepatitis B (Nature Genetics, 1997) and genetic determinants of alcohol preference and alcoholic liver disease (Nature Communications, 2012).
- Mutations in the GABRB1 gene promoting alcohol consumption through increased tonic inhibition, furthering understanding of genetic control of alcohol use.

He has authored over 500 scientific publications, co-edited multiple editions of Viral Hepatitis and Hepatitis C, and founded the Journal of Viral Hepatitis.

== Inquiries and legal testimony ==
Thomas provided scientific and clinical expertise to UK inquiries into infected blood, including the Skipton Infected Blood Compensation Scheme, and gave expert testimony in the case Chiron Corporation v. Organon Teknika Ltd (1994), relating to patents on hepatitis C virus testing.

== Awards and honours ==
Thomas's contributions to hepatology and liver research have been recognised through a number of awards:

- British Society of Gastroenterology Research Medal (1984).
- Hans Popper International Prize for Distinction in Hepatology (1989).
- Lifetime Recognition Award, British Association for the Study of the Liver (2010).
- Lifetime Achievement Award, European Association for the Study of the Liver (2010).
- Imperial College Medal (2013).

He has delivered named lectures including:

- Humphry Davy Rolleston Lecture at the Royal College of Physicians (1986, United Kingdom)
- Cohen Lecture (1988, Israel)
- Bushell Lecture (1990, Australia)
- Hans Popper Lecture (1996, Switzerland)
- Ralph Wright Lecture (1999, United Kingdom)
- Sheila Sherlock Lecture (2005, South Africa and Canada).
