= Ronald Howard =

Ronald Howard may refer to:

- Ron Howard (born 1954), American actor and director
- Ron Howard (politician) (1953–2021), American politician
- Ronald Howard (actor) (1918–1996), British actor
- Ronald A. Howard (1934-2024), Stanford professor
- Ron Howard (American football) (born 1951), American football player
- Ron Howard (Australian footballer) (1940–2023), Australian footballer for Footscray
- Ron Howard (basketball) (born 1982), American professional basketball player
- Ronald Ray Howard (1973–2005), American executed murderer
