= George Howard =

George Howard may refer to:

== Music ==
- George Howard (jazz) (1956–1998), American smooth jazz saxophonist
- George S. Howard (1902–1995), American colonel and conductor of United States Air Force Band

== Politics ==
- George Howard (Governor of Maryland) (1789–1846), governor of Maryland, 1831–1833
- Sir George Howard (courtier) (c.1525–1580), MP for Devizes, Rochester, Winchelsea, Newton and Reigate
- George Howard (died 1671) (1622–1671), English politician who sat in the House of Commons between 1660 and 1671
- George Howard, 4th Earl of Suffolk (1624–1691)
- George Howard, 6th Earl of Carlisle (1773–1848), English statesman
- George R. Howard (died 1884), American politician
- George Howard, 7th Earl of Carlisle (1802–1864), British politician and statesman
- George Howard, 9th Earl of Carlisle (1843–1911), English aristocrat, politician and painter
- George Howard, 11th Earl of Carlisle (1895–1963), British peer
- George Howard, 13th Earl of Carlisle (born 1949), English hereditary peer
- George Howard, Baron Howard of Henderskelfe (1920–1984), British life peer

== Sports ==
- George Howard (rugby league), rugby league footballer of the 1940s and 1950s
- George Howard (footballer) (born 1996), association footballer for Melbourne Victory

== Other ==
- Sir George Howard (British Army officer) (1718–1796), British military officer and field marshal
- George C. Howard (1818–1887), Nova Scotian-born American actor and showman
- George W. Howard (1848–1940), American railway worker and union leader
- George Elliott Howard (1849–1928), American professor of history
- George Bronson Howard (1884–1922), American reporter and fiction writer
- George Wren Howard (1893–1968), British publisher
- George Howard Jr. (1924–2007), American federal judge
- George Howard (Hebraist) (1935–2018), American professor of Jewish Studies
- 'George Howard', a pseudonym used by bank robber George Leonidas Leslie
