= Tim Howard (disambiguation) =

Tim Howard (born 1979) is an American professional soccer player.

Tim Howard may also refer to:

- Tim Howard (attorney) (born 1961), American lawyer
- Tim Howard (field hockey) (born 1996), Australian field hockey player
- Soltero (musician), American singer/songwriter
