= Ben Howard (poet) =

American poet

Ben W. Howard (born 1944 in Iowa), Emeritus Professor of English at Alfred University, is an American poet, essayist, scholar, and critic. He is the author of twelve books, including three collections of essays on Zen practice, six collections of poems, a verse novella, and a critical study of modern Irish writing. From 1973-2000, he served as a regular reviewer for Poetry. Over the past four decades, he has contributed more than 250 poems, essays, and reviews to leading journals in North America and abroad, including Poetry, Shenandoah, Poetry Ireland Review, Agenda, and the Sewanee Review. Until his retirement in 2006, he taught courses in literature and writing and an Honors course in Buddhist meditation at Alfred University. He also taught classical guitar and often performed in faculty recitals. From 1998 to 2022 he led the Falling Leaf Sangha, a Rinzai Zen practice group in Alfred, New York. For the past decade he has also offered guest lectures and conducted meditative retreats at the Olean Meditation Center in Olean, New York. "One Time, One Meeting," his monthly column, explores aspects of Zen practice.

== Bibliography ==
Books

- The Absolute Moment: Essays on Western Zen, Jericho Hill Publishing, 2023 ISBN 9781732446861
- Immovable Awareness: The Intimate Practice of Zen, Whitlock Publishing, 2016 ISBN 978-1-943115-16-7
- Firewood and Ashes: New and Selected Poems, Salmon Poetry, 2015 ISBN 978-1-910669-10-5
- The Backward Step: Essays on Zen Practice, Whitlock Publishing, 2014 ISBN 978-0-9770956-1-2
- Entering Zen, Whitlock Publishing, 2011 ISBN 978-0-9770956-7-4
- Leaf, Sunlight, Asphalt, Salmon Publishing, 2009 ISBN 978-1-907056-13-0
- Dark Pool, Salmon Publishing, 2004 ISBN 978-1-903392-32-4
- Midcentury, Salmon Publishing, 1997 ISBN 978-1-897648-74-2
- The Pressed Melodeon: Essays on Modern Irish Writing, Story Line Press, 1996
- Lenten Anniversaries: Poems 1982–1989, Cummington Press,1990
- Northern Interior: Poems 1975–1982, Cummington Press, 1986 ISBN 978-99976-229-0-7
- Father of Waters: Poems 1965–1976, University of Nebraska: Abattoir Editions, 1979

Inclusion in anthologies

  - Open-Eyed, Full-Throated: An Anthology of American / Irish Poets, Arlen House, 2019
  - If Ever You Go: A Map of Dublin in Poetry and Song, Dedalus Press, 2014
  - The Book of Irish American Poetry, University of Notre Dame Press, 2007
  - 180 More: Extraordinary Poems for Every Day, Random House, 2005
  - The POETRY Anthology: 1912–2002, Ivan R. Dee, 2002
  - A Green Place:Modern Poems, Delacorte, 1982.
  - The POETRY Anthology: 1912–1977, Houghton Mifflin, 1978
  - Strong Measures: Contemporary American Poetry in Traditional Form, Longman, 1997

== Reviews ==
About The Backward Step, Roshi Joan Halifax, Abbot of the Upaya Center, has written: "Wise and true, this wonderful book transmits the essence of practice realization."

Reviewing Firewood and Ashes: New and Selected Poems in Poetry Northwest (December 17, 2015), Adam Tavel observes that this collection "displays the poet's lyrical sonorousness, formal mastery, and spiritual inquisitiveness ... His poems are notable and noble in their craft, heart, and panoramic gaze. For a half-century now, he has written poems with one foot in the Romantic tradition and the other firmly planted in our modern predicament ... One hopes this representative gathering of poems old and recent will allow a new generation of readers to discover Ben Howard's lush wisdom—a wisdom rooted in the poetic tradition and attuned to our fraught young century."

In his review of Leaf, Sunlight, Asphalt, Howard's fifth collection of poems, Ray Olson observes that the author "manages iambs as well as anyone since Christopher Marlowe ... Few other contemporary poets make ordinary living seem as rich and rewarding." (Booklist, 35, January 1 & 15, 2010).

Reviewing Dark Pool, Howard's fifth collection of poems, for Booklist, Ray Olson notes that Howard "writes just about the most natural, musical iambic line around these days, primarily in a propulsive, precise, and vocal blank verse but also in sonnets, quatrains, and unrhymed forms. It's as seductive of the inner ear as Irish storytelling is of the outer, gently drawing attention to large, subtle meanings."

Reviewing Midcentury for Irish Echo, Michael Stephens remarks that Howard's verse is "elegant, elegiac, casual yet moving," and he likens the structure of the book to "a great symphony, the kind that, moment to moment, is intimate, and yet its overall reach is almost beyond human grasp."

== Awards ==
- NEA Fellowship in Creative Writing
- Milton Dorfman Prize in Poetry
- Theodore Christian Hoepfner Award
