= Charlie Howard (cricketer) =

English cricketer

Personal information
- Full name: Charlie Howard
- Born: 27 September 1854; Chichester, Sussex, England
- Died: 20 May 1929 (aged 74); Chichester, Sussex, England
- Batting: Right-handed
- Bowling: Unknown

Domestic team information
- Years: Team
- 1874–1882: Sussex

Career statistics
Competition	First-class
Matches	23
Runs scored	588
Batting average	16.33
100s/50s	1/–
Top score	106
Balls bowled	16
Wickets	–
Bowling average	–
5 wickets in innings	–
10 wickets in match	–
Best bowling	–
Catches/stumpings	6/–
- Source: Cricinfo, 26 August 2012

Charlie Howard (27 September 1854 – 20 May 1929) was an English cricketer. Howard was a right-handed batsman, although his bowling style is unknown. He was born at Chichester, Sussex.

Howard made his first-class debut for Sussex against Surrey in 1874 at the County Ground, Hove. He made 21 further first-class appearances for Sussex, the last of which came against Hampshire in 1882. In his 22 first-class appearances for Sussex, he scored 508 runs at an average of 17.14, with a high score of 106. He made this score against Hampshire in 1880, with this score being his only first-class century, as well as being the only time he passed fifty. He also made a single first-class appearance for a United Eleven against the touring Australian in 1882, which was his final first-class match.

He died at the city of his birth on 20 May 1929.
