= David Howard (photographer artist) =

American photographer

David E. T. Howard
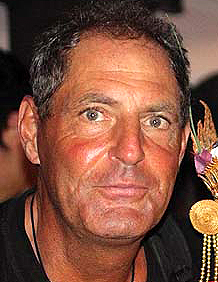
- David Howard in 2010
- Born: January 25, 1952 (age 74); Brooklyn, New York
- Education: San Francisco Art Institute
- Occupation: Artist
- Known for: Documenting Keith Haring and Asian Headhunting Tribes

David E. T. Howard (1952) is an American photographic artist. Howard collaborated with Keith Haring, Christo, Nam June Paik when, in the late 1980s, he created the documentary series: "Art Seen" that featured in excess of 120 programs; it was created in artists' studios, broadcast on PBS, and televised in more than 17 American cities.

== Works and accomplishments ==
The San Francisco Chronicle and The Village Voice have described Howard as "An experimental photographer of amazing ability." Howard interviewed photographers Ansel Adams, Aaron Siskind, Jerry Uelsmann, and Ralph Gibson and in 1978 published their interviews in his book entitled: "Perspectives." Howard's other books include: "The Last Filipino Head Hunters" (Last Gasp 2000), "Sacred Journey: The Ganges to the Himalayas" (published by Taschen in four languages in 2004), "Ten Southeast Asian Tribes from Five Countries" (Last Gasp 2008) and "Realities; Final Revised Vision Version III David Howard, Keith Haring, Christo, Nam June Paik, Ansel Adams, Aaron Siskind, Ralph Gibson, Jerry Uelsmann, Robert Heinecken" (Art Sales and Rentals 2018).

Howard collaborated with Keith Haring, Christo, Nam June Paik when, in the 1980s, he created the documentary series: "Art Seen" that featured in excess of 120 programs, was created in artist's studios, broadcast on PBS, and televised in more than 17 American cities. In 1985, the first episode, entitled: "New York's East Village Art Scene," premiered at the Whitney Museum of American Art in New York City, the Hirshhorn Museum in Washington DC, and the San Francisco Art Institute. Howard is also an athlete: he swam the complete span under the Golden Gate bridge twice, from San Francisco to Marin County, in 1985 and 1986.
