= James Scott Howard =

First postmaster in Toronto (1798–1866)

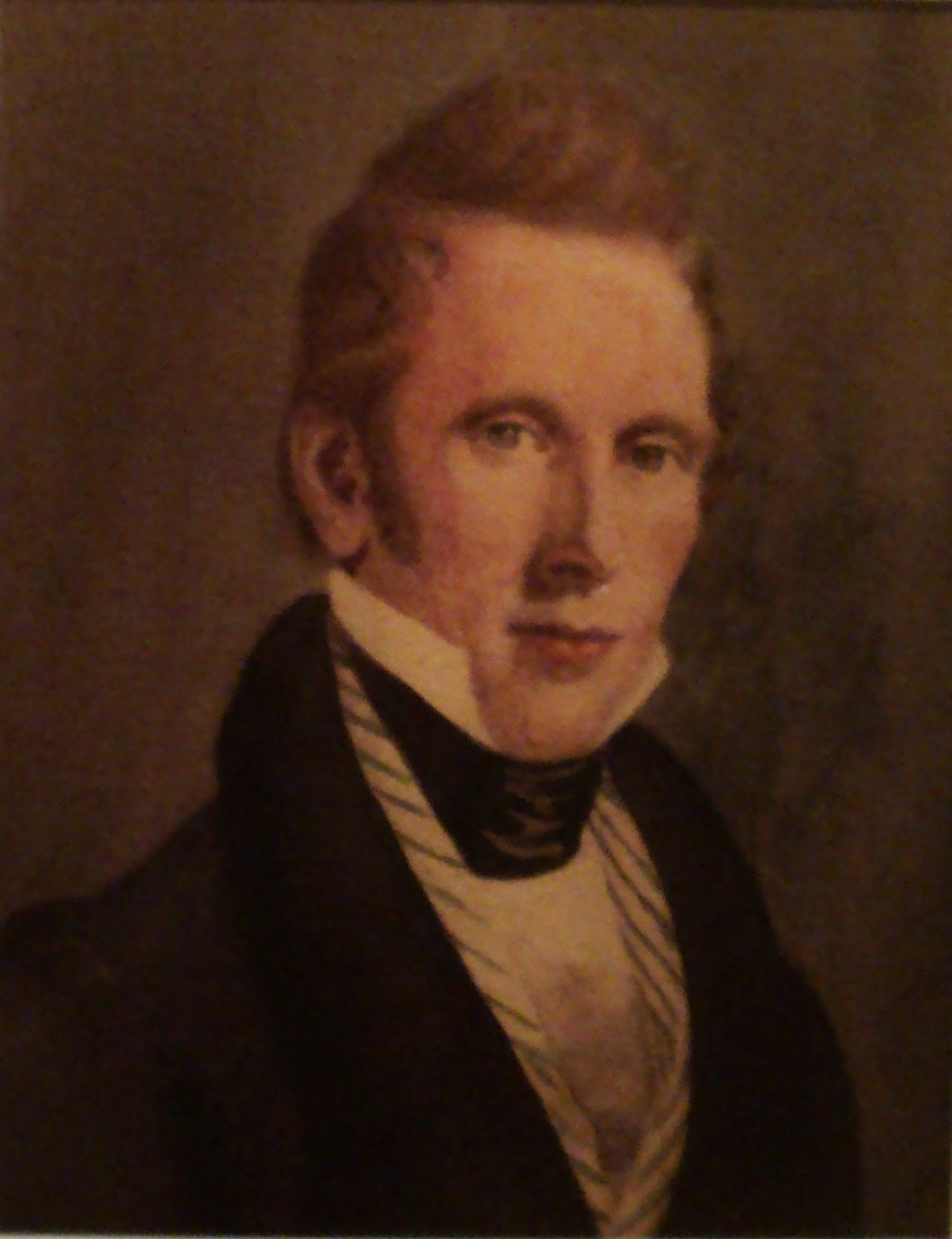
- Painting of Howard

Postmaster for Town of York; first postmaster in the new City of Toronto government
- In office July 2, 1828 – December 13, 1837
- Monarchs: George IV, William IV

Personal details
- Born: September 2, 1798 Bandon, County Cork, Ireland
- Died: March 1, 1866 (aged 67) Toronto, Canada West

James Scott Howard (September 2, 1798 – March 1, 1866) was a public servant in Canada West. He served as postmaster in the Town of York and later was the first postmaster in the newly formed City of Toronto government. He lost his position during the Upper Canada Rebellion in 1837.

== Biography ==
=== Early and personal life ===
Howard was born on September 2, 1798, to John Howard and Mary Scot in Bandon, County Cork in what is now the Republic of Ireland. At 21, he left Ireland in 1819 and briefly settled in Fredericton, New Brunswick. There, he met and married Salome McLean, becoming the son-in-law of Archibald McLean. Together, James and Salome would have three children.

=== Work with the Post Office ===
Howard arrived in the Town of York in 1820, shortly after which he was appointed as a member of staff for the First Toronto Post Office, where he worked under William Allan. On July 2, 1828, he succeeded Allan as postmaster of the Town of York, a "plum position" in a colonial capital. His annual salary in the position of Postmaster was 713 pounds. He reported to Thomas Stayner, the Deputy Postmaster General for British North America stationed in Quebec City. The postmaster of York was the unofficial Deputy Postmaster General for Upper Canada, the most important postal official in the colony. To the residents of York, being a British and very Anglican town, having an Irish Methodist in this position caused him to be viewed with wariness by some. Howard moved his family north to an area close to Yonge St and St. Clair Avenue. The move freed up his former living space in the post office, allowing it to expand. He would commute to the post office on horseback.

During this busy time, Stayner offered Howard the newly created position of Post Office Surveyor of Upper Canada. Having recently relocated his family and happy with his job in Toronto, he declined the position (Charles Albert Berczy would accept the position). This decision would have "dire consequences" for Howard in the future. Amid the tension surrounding the Rebellion and growing suspicious, Howard wrote to Berczy asking for an investigation on December 9, 1837. He was assured that there was nothing against him except that he had associated too much with "those people" (the rebels); however, he was removed from his post by Lieutenant Governor Francis Bond Head on December 13, 1837, much to his surprise. Howard would learn from Thomas Stayner in January 1838 that Governor Head suspected him "of compliance with the aims and plans of the rebels" because of prior contact he had with John and Joseph Lesslie and the fact that he mostly appointed revolutionary party sympathizers to the Toronto post office. Howard did not take up arms against the rebels, further reinforcing Head's doubts about him. Howard tried to answer the accusations against him by stressing his political neutrality and explaining that as postmaster he had never voted nor attended a political meeting. He was never asked to leave his post and take up arms. Despite this, Head wanted a "zealously loyal man" in charge of the post office and he was unable to understand nor tolerate Howard's neutrality. Howard also refused to open mail of suspected rebels before the 1837 uprising, further infuriating his superiors.

Howard's case was brought before Lord Glenelg, the colonial secretary in February 1838. Glenelg consulted both Bond Head and his successor, George Arthur; Head stood firm in his position; though Arthur agreed, he did obtain a report from the Executive Council in May 1838, signed by Robert Baldwin Sullivan, Allan, and Augustus Baldwin. Although supporting Howard's political neutrality, it upheld Head's action to dismiss Howard. Lord Glenelg chose not to act and would let the matter rest. During the Rebellion, William Lyon Mackenzie entered Howard's house, harassed his wife, and commandeered provisions for the rebel troops.

After Howard's wrongful dismissal, postal operations were moved in 1839 to a location at Front and Yonge Streets in Toronto.

=== Later years ===
After losing his job at the Post Office, he was employed as Treasurer of the Home District from 1842 to 1866, also serving as Secretary of the Upper Canada Bible Society and serving on the Board of Education from 1846 to his death in 1866.

Howard was granted a coat of arms on January 23, 1857, bearing the motto "PRO FIDE" by Letters Patent. At the time of issuance, Howard was a Justice of the Peace and the Treasurer of the United Counties of York and Peel.

Howard died on March 1, 1866, in Toronto, Canada West.

== Legacy ==
His firing has been called "the best documented drama of the 1837 Rebellion" by one source. Another source explains "Ultimately, the shadowy prejudices and self-interest of the ruling colonial elite, the Family Compact, conspired to deny justice to a man not part of the in-crowd. He fought and fought and fought for a year and a half, and eventually lost his house and his farm."
