= Matthew Howard III =

American neurosurgeon (born 1959)

Matthew Howard III (born 1959) is an American neurosurgeon, electrophysiologist, and inventor. He is currently a Professor and Chairman of the Department of Neurosurgery at the University of Iowa. He is well known for his contributions in the field of human brain mapping using intracranial electrophysiology.
