= Doc Howard =

American baseball player

- Outfielder
- Born: May 1873; Pennsylvania, U.S.
- Died: August 14, 1904; East Liverpool, Ohio, U.S.

Negro league baseball debut
- 1897, for the Cuban Giants

Last appearance
- 1899, for the Cuban X-Giants

Teams
- Cuban Giants (1897); Cuban X-Giants (1898–1899)

Charles Howard (May 1873 – August 14, 1904), nicknamed "Doc", was an American Negro league outfielder in the 1890s.

A native of Pennsylvania, Howard played for the Cuban Giants in 1897 and the Cuban X-Giants the following two seasons. He died in East Liverpool, Ohio in 1904 at age 31. Howard was shot and killed by a woman he had been attacking.
