= Clodomir Houard =

French botanist and entomologist (1873–1943)

Clodomir Antony Vincent Houard (1873–1943) was a French botanist and entomologist whose chief interest was plant galls. He was Professor of Botany at the University of Strasbourg in 1940, and was the author of some 95 works on cecidology in 230 publications in 3 languages.

Houard's interest in galls developed while he was studying in Paris. After assisting in a botanical laboratory, he was appointed as Inspector of Phytopathology and adjunct professor in Caen between 1911 and 1917, whereafter from 1919 to 1934 he was Director of the Institute of Botany and the Botanical Garden in Strasbourg. Despite retiring from this last position in 1934 he stayed on until Germany's WWII occupation of Strasbourg in 1940 made it prudent to leave.

He travelled widely in Europe and North America, studying and gathering galls in herbaria and in nature, building up an extensive collection which is housed at the Muséum national d'Histoire naturelle in Paris. He published a series of 6 seminal books between 1908 and 1940 on gall structure, another on the galls of North America not seeing publication because of the manuscript's being lost during the occupation of Strasbourg.

== Selected works ==
- Les Zoocécidies des Plantes d'Afrique, d'Asie et d'Océanie (1922)
- Les zoocécidies des plantes d'Europe et du bassin de la Méditerranée
- Les zoocécidies des plantes de l'Amérique sud et de l'Amérique centrale
- Catalogue sytématique des zoocécidies de l'Europe et du bassin méditerranéen
- Recherches anatomiques sur les galles de tiges
- Les zoocécidies des plantes de l'Amérique du Nord
