= James M. Howard Jr. =

American school teacher

James Merriam Howard Jr.
- Born: 1922; Morris town, New Jersey.
- Died: 2002 (aged 79–80)
- Education: Harvard University.
- Occupation: Teaching

James Merriam Howard Jr. (1922–2002) was an American teacher, educational advocate, and national expert on the use of writing to enhance learning and improve critical thinking. Howard served as the headmaster of Blair Academy, a private boarding school in Blairstown, New Jersey, for 22 years (1954–1976). While serving in this role, he guided the revival of Blair's academic reputation. Blair Academy awarded Howard their Citation of Merit, the school's highest honor, in 1994.

== Early life, education, and career launch ==
Howard was born in Morristown, New Jersey in 1922. He graduated from Morristown School (now Morristown-Beard School) in 1938 and then completed a post-graduate year at All Saints School in Bloxham, England. Howard received his bachelor's degree from Yale University in New Haven, Connecticut in 1943. During his time at the school, Howard sang in The Whiffenpoofs, an a cappella group. He was the first second-generation member of the group, which his father co-founded in 1919. Howard graduated from Yale after receiving election to Phi Beta Kappa.

In 1953, Howard completed his master's degree at Harvard University. Launching his educational career, he worked as a history teacher at Lawrenceville School, a private boarding school in Lawrence Township, Mercer County, New Jersey, for nine years.

== Authorship and seminars ==
Howard served as editor for the Council for Basic Education in Washington D.C. from 1976 to 1982. During this period, he co-authored Empty Pages: A Search for Writing Competence in School and Society. The 1979 text analyzed the writing instruction crisis in America. Howard's second book, Writing to Learn, achieved national recognition as a handbook on how to teach writing and helped launch his consulting career.

During the 1980s, Howard ran writing seminars for staff members at the U.S. Department of Justice, the U.S. Department of Health and Human Services, and the Internal Revenue Service. He also led writing seminars for public school systems around the U.S. and promoting writing instruction by teachers of all subjects. While consulting for governmental and private organizations, Howard penned articles and book reviews for Federal Bar News & Journal (the Federal Bar Association's journal) and other periodicals.

== Military service ==
Howard enlisted with the U.S. Marine Corps as a private in December 1943. Three months later, he received a commission of second lieutenant. Howard served overseas in the Pacific Theatre of World War II until returning to the U.S. for the birth his first son on March 19, 1944.

== Recognition and legacy ==
During his career, Howard received multiple honors for his educational advocacy. The Educational Press Association (now the Association of Educational Publishers) awarded him their Distinguished Service Award for Excellence in Educational Journalism in 1985. Lafayette College in Easton, Pennsylvania awarded Howard an honorary doctorate in literature in 1963. Following his death in 2002, the Westport River Watershed Alliance in Westport, Massachusetts named their book award for significant improvement in writing after Howard. Howard had served as editor-in-chief of the watershed alliance's newsletter and assisted students who worked on the student insert to the newsletter.

== Family ==
James Howard married Sarah Seymour Howard on September 25, 1942. They had one child together, James M. Howard, III. Sally Howard died in 1945 after she contracted poliomyelitis. Four years later, James Howard married Selena Tatlock Howard. They had three children together: Alida Howard Woods, Mollie Howard Conklin, and Eleanor Howard.
