= Daniel Howard =

Daniel Howard may refer to:

- Daniel Howard (rugby league) (born 1984), rugby league footballer
- Daniel Edward Howard (1861–1935), President of Liberia
- J. Daniel Howard (born 1943), U.S. Under Secretary of the Navy
- Danny Howard (born 1987), British dance music DJ and producer
- Dan Howard (born 1976), Australian volleyball player
