= Charles Howard (cricketer, born 1904) =

English cricketer

Cricket information
- Batting: Right-handed
- Bowling: Right-arm medium

Career statistics
Competition	First-class
Matches	9
Runs scored	123
Batting average	12.30
100s/50s	0/0
Top score	29
Catches/stumpings	2/–
- Source: CricInfo, 17 June 2011

Charles William Henry Howard (7 November 1904 – 1982) was an English cricketer.

Born in Beckenham, Kent and educated at Tonbridge School. He represented Tonbridge (1921–1923), Kent 2nd XI (1924–1925) and Middlesex in nine first-class matches as a professional right-handed batsman with modest success in 1931.

Howard disappeared from the cricket scene after 1931. Following research by ESPNcricinfo, it was revealed that Howard had died in 1982 at the age of 77.
