= Marie-Claire Houard =

Belgian civil servant

Marie-Claire Houard is a Belgian civil servant from the city of Liège committed to preserving the unity of Belgium amidst the ongoing political crisis. She organized a protest march of 35,000 on 18 November 2007 and her petition supporting Belgian unity was signed by more than 100,000 people. In 2000 she was dismissed from her job at the Post for having stolen 5000 euro from elderly people.
