= Ann Howard (author) =

Australian historian (born 1942)

- Born: 1942 (age 83–84); London, England
- Writing career
- Subjects: Australian wartime history; Dangar Island history
- Notable works: You'll Be Sorry!; A Carefree War; C'mon Over; Rainbow River

Ann Howard (born 1942) is an Australian author and historian. She has written books on the history of the Australian Women's Army Service, including You'll Be Sorry! How World War II Changed Women's Lives. Her more recent books include A Carefree War: The Hidden History of World War II Child Evacuees, which she wrote after interviewing more than 100 Australians about their experiences. Howard made a podcast of this material on Afternoon Light with Georgina Downer Podcast 157, at the invitation of Melbourne University. A resident of Dangar Island on the Hawkesbury River, New South Wales, for over 50 years, Howard has also authored four books on the island's history.

== Early life in England ==
Howard was born in London in 1942. During World War II, she was evacuated with her mother to Eastbourne on the coast of Sussex, where her family remained after the war. She received a scholarship to Goldsmiths, University of London, intending to become a painter.

== Life in Australia ==
Howard moved to Sydney, Australia, with her husband and their two young children in the 1970s. After he died unexpectedly, she bought a run-down property on Dangar Island, just north of Sydney. Called The Pavilion, it was the last remaining part of the homestead of politician Henry Cary Dangar, built in 1889. Howard completed two masters degrees while working as a teacher, raising her three sons, and gradually restoring the heritage home.

Howard shared her home with her husband, singer and accused paedophile Robert Bickerstaff

Regarding her work as a historian, Howard has stated, "I like grassroots history; I don't like history that is politicised. I like to hear people's voices and try to provide a platform for people's voices. So I'm always listening for stories."

== Major works and critical reception ==
=== You'll Be Sorry! ===
Howard's You'll Be Sorry: How World War II Changed Women's Lives (2016) is based largely on extracts from interviews, letters, and other recollections of 150 Australian women who served in the wartime auxiliary services, focusing on their experiences in assisting the military and their return to often "duller or frustrating lives" afterwards. The women worked as clerks, cryptographers, transport drivers, despatch riders, and at coastal artillery installations.

The 2016 edition published by BigSky Publishing is an augmented version of two volumes Howard originally published in 1990, including You'll Be Sorry! and Where Do We Go From Here? In 2017, You'll Be Sorry was shortlisted for the Society of Women Writers' non-fiction history prize.

=== C'mon Over ===
Her book, C'mon Over: Voluntary Child Migrants from Tilbury to Sydney (2002), examined the lives of children who were sent from England to Australia under a child welfare scheme started by Dr Thomas Barnardo.

In 2003, a review in The Journal of Australian Studies commended the way that Howard "skilfully outlines the precarious act faced by policy makers" in C'mon Over: Voluntary Child Migrants from Tilbury to Sydney. Noting that Howard, like Barnardo, "[eschews] statistics in favour of personal vignettes and concrete details" about the child migrants' experiences, the review stated that the "main complaint is simply that too little of each story is told", while acknowledging "the need to compress what is surely a staggering amount of research".

=== A Carefree War ===
For A Carefree War: The Hidden History of World War II Child Evacuees (2018), Howard interviewed more than 100 Australians about their wartime experiences as children who were sent inland for their protection. A 2018 review in Agora said that A Carefree War: The Hidden History of World War II Child Evacuees "succeeds in painting a picture of this darkest and most perilous year", 1942, when it appeared a Japanese invasion of Australia was imminent. A review in The Australian called it a "scrupulously researched and usefully indexed book".

=== Dangar Tales ===
In addition, Howard has written four books on the history of Dangar Island, including details about its social history. The Bush Telegraph Weekly said that Rainbow on the River and Other Dangar Tales "sheds light on previously unknown history of Dangar Island with many marvellous river tales." Environmental historian Paul Boon noted that "[Howard's] books collate an amusing collection of anecdotes and snippets of local history."

== Selected bibliography ==
=== Non-fiction historical ===
- A Carefree War: The Hidden History of World War II Child Evacuees
- You'll Be Sorry! How World War II Changed Women's Lives
- Where Do We Go From Here? Compelling Postwar Experiences of Australian Ex-Servicewomen, 1945–1948
- C'mon Over: Voluntary Child Migrants from Tilbury to Sydney, 1921 to 1965
- After Barnardo: Voluntary Child Migrants from Tilbury to Sydney, 1921 to 1965, with Eric Leonard
- Women in Australia

=== Books on Dangar Island ===
- Rainbow on the River & Other Dangar Tales
- Derrymacash to Dangar
- Ten Dry Pies & Other Dangar Tales
- A Ghost, a Murder & Other Dangar Tales

=== Books for Secondary Students ===
- The Cattle Drovers (The Making of Australia)
- Coaches, Riverboats, and Railways (The Making of Australia)

=== Short works ===
- "The Old Country" in Haunted Encounters: Ghost Stories from Around the World
