= Robert Howard =

Robert Howard may refer to:

== Entertainment ==
- Robert Howard (playwright) (1626–1698), English playwright and politician
- Robert Boardman Howard (1896–1983), American muralist and sculptor
- Robert E. Howard (1906–1936), fantasy writer, creator of Conan the Barbarian
- Bob Howard (singer) (1906–1986), American jazz pianist and vocalist
- Robert Howard ("Dr. Robert", born 1961), British pop star and member of the Blow Monkeys

== Politics ==
- Robert Howard (Royalist) (1585–1653), Royalist commander and M.P.
- Robert Danvers (1624–1674), aka Robert Howard, English politician
- Robert Howard, 2nd Earl of Wicklow (1757–1815), Anglo-Irish politician and peer
- Robert Howard (unionist) (1845–1902), British-born American labor union leader and politician
- Robert Mowbray Howard (1854–1928), English official
- Rob Howard (politician) (fl. 2009), Canadian politician

== Religion ==
- Robert Howard (bishop) (1670–1740), Anglican prelate in the Church of Ireland
- Robert Wilmot Howard (1887–1960), British Anglican priest and academic

== Sports ==
- Robert Howard (martial artist) (born 1938), Irish taekwondo master
- Robert Howard (Irish swimmer) (1956–2013), Irish Olympic swimmer
- Robert Howard (American swimmer) (born 1996), American freestyle swimmer
- Robert Howard (triple jumper) (1975–2004), American triple jumper
- Bob Howard (American football) (1944–2008), American football defensive back
- Bobby Howard (running back) (born 1964), American football running back
- Bob Howard (born 1963), American professional wrestler best known as Hardcore Holly
- Robert Howard (wrestler, born 2002)
- Rob Howard (footballer) (born 1999), English footballer

== Other ==
- Robert Howard (knight) (1385–1436), father of John Howard, 1st Duke of Norfolk
- Bob Howard (political scientist) (born 1936), Australian professor of international relations
- Robert F. Howard (1883–1963), Texan farmer and agriculture professor
- Robert L. Howard (1939–2009), Medal of Honor recipient during the Vietnam War
- Robert Howard (1944–2015), responsible for the murder of Hannah Williams in England, and maybe others
- Robert Rice Howard (known as 'Nosey Bob' Howard) (1832–1906), Australian executioner, active from 1875 to 1904
- Robert Souper Howard (1818–1881), Chilean soldier
- Robert Howard Hodgkin (1877–1951), British historian
- Robert Howard (psychiatrist) (born 1961), British professor of psychiatry
