= Michael Howard (disambiguation) =

Michael Howard, Baron Howard of Lympne (born 1941) is a British politician.

Michael Howard may also refer to:

== Arts and entertainment ==
- Michael Howard (comedian) (1916–1988), British actor and comedian
- Michael Howard (musician) (1922–2002), English choral conductor, organist and composer
- Michael Howard (American actor) (1923–2019), American actor and teacher
- Michael Howard (filmmaker) (born 1978), American filmmaker, photographer, and actor
- Michael Howard Studios, an acting studio in Manhattan, New York

== Sports ==
- Michael Howard (fencer) (born 1928), British Olympian
- Mike Howard (born 1958), baseball player
- Michael Howard (Australian footballer) (born 1965)
- Michael Howard (footballer, born 1978), English footballer
- Michael Howard (footballer, born 1999), English footballer

== Other ==
- Michael Howard (Irish politician) (1933–2009), Fine Gael politician
- Michael Howard (historian) (1922–2019), British military historian
- Michael Howard, 21st Earl of Suffolk (1935–2022), English peer
- Michael Howard (Microsoft) (born 1965), in software security
- Michael Howard (Luciferian) (1948–2015), English author
- Michael Howard (American politician) (born 1983)
- Michael L. Howard, US Army general
