= J. J. Howard =

American author

J.J. Howard
- Born: York, PA
- Education: Dickinson College (BA), Tiffin University (MH)
- Occupations: Writer, teacher
- Writing career
- Language: English
- Genres: Young adult fiction; Middle grade fiction
- Website: www.jjhowardbooks.com

J.J. Howard is an American author of young adult fiction. Her debut novel, That Time I Joined the Circus, was published by Scholastic Point in April, 2013. Her second novel, Tracers, was published by Putnam in 2015. The film Tracers starring Taylor Lautner of Twilight fame was released in February of that year. She has written five books for Scholastic's Wish series centering on pugs. The most recent, Girls Just Wanna Have Pugs, was released in 2020.

== Biography ==
J.J. was born and raised in York, Pennsylvania, and attended Dickinson College in Carlisle, Pennsylvania, where she earned her BA in English. She moved to Florida in 1998, and continued her teaching career. J.J. taught Advanced Placement (AP) and ninth grade English at a small private school Lake Mary Preparatory School. In 2010, J.J. earned her MH from Tiffin University. She then began working at Palm Beach Day Academy, where she teaches English. She cites her students as both inspiration and influence. She is currently working on several new young adult novels. Her debut novel began as an assignment for a course on Novel Writing, and she wrote the first draft as part of National Novel Writing Month in 2009.

== Works ==
- That Time I Joined the Circus, Scholastic Point, 2013
- Tracers, Putnam Juvenile, 2015
- Sit, Stay, Love, Scholastic, 2016
- Z on Location, Scholastic, 2017
- Pugs and Kisses, Scholastic, 2018
- Pugs in a Blanket, Scholastic, 2019
- The Love Pug, Scholastic, 2019
- Girls Just Wanna Have Pugs, 2020

== Reception ==
Publishers Weekly said of That Time I Joined the Circus, "Howard's well-paced debut is a contemporary twist on the old-fashioned notion of running away from home to join a circus." Kirkus recommends the book, saying: "For any reader who ever has felt like running away to join the circus."
