= Randy Howard =

Randy Howard may refer to:

- Randy Howard (country singer) (1950–2015), American country singer-songwriter and producer
- Randy Howard (fiddler) (1960–1999), American bluegrass, country and old time fiddler
