= Mary Howard =

Mary Howard may refer to:

- Mary FitzRoy, Duchess of Richmond and Somerset (1519–1557), née Lady Mary Howard, lady-in-waiting, wife of Henry Fitzroy, daughter of the 3rd Duke of Norfolk and daughter-in-law of Henry VIII
- Mary FitzAlan (1541–1557), Duchess of Norfolk, whose married name was Mary Howard
- Mary Howard, of the Holy Cross (1653–1735), English nun
- Mary Howard, Duchess of Norfolk (died 1705) (c. 1659–1705), British peer
- Maria Howard, Duchess of Norfolk (c.1693–1754), British noblewoman, known as Mary
- Mary Scott, Countess of Deloraine (born Howard, 1703–1744), British courtier and royal governess
- Mary Howard, Duchess of Norfolk (died 1773) (c. 1712–1773), British noblewoman after whom Norfolk Island was named
- Mary Howard, pseudonym of American politician Mary E. Woolley Chamberlain (1870–1953)
- Mary Howard (novelist) (1907–1991), British romantic novelist
- Mary Shipman Howard (1911–1976), recording engineer and recording studio owner
- Mary Howard de Liagre (1913–2009), American actress usually credited as Mary Howard
- Mary Howard, fictional character in the 1941 film When Ladies Meet
- Mary Howard (politician) (active since 2023), Vermont state legislator
- Mary Fitz (also Howard) (1596–1671), English noblewoman
- Mary Howard, Countess of Stafford (1619–1693), English suo jure peeress
