= Mark Howard =

Mark Howard may refer to:

- Mark Howard (footballer, born January 1986), English footballer
- Mark Howard (footballer, born September 1986), English football goalkeeper
- Mark Howard (broadcaster) (born 1973), Australian television broadcaster
- Mark Howard, musician and member of the Cluster Pluckers
- Mark Howard (producer) (born 1964), record producer
- Mark Howard (racing driver) (born 1965), British racing driver
- Mark Howard Irish, Canadian politician

== See also ==
- Marc Howard (disambiguation)
