= David Sanctuary Howard =

David Sanctuary Howard (1928 – 2005) was a noted expert on Chinese armorial porcelain.

Born in Manchester 22 January 1928, he died 25 March 2005. He was educated at Stowe School. He served in the Coldstream Guards. He set up and ran Heirloom & Howard, a business specialising in restoring armorial artefacts to the families with whom they were connected. The business began in Mayfair and later relocated to Wiltshire.

He was the author of:

- Chinese Armorial Porcelain Volume I (1974) ISBN 0-571-09811-8
  - Volume II (2003) ISBN 0-954-43890-6
- The Choice of the Private Trader (1994) ISBN 0-302-00642-7
- The Unforgiving Minute (2004) ISBN 1-841-04124-6

He also published a number of other books.

Had four children with his first wife, Elizabeth North.
