= Jane Howard (journalist) =

American journalist

Jane Temple Howard
- Born: May 4, 1935; Springfield, Illinois, US
- Died: June 27, 1996 (aged 61)
- Resting place: Bangor Friends Cemetery, Bango, Marshall County, Iowa
- Education: A.B., University of Michigan, D.Litt., Grinell College, DHumLitt., Hamline University
- Occupations: Author, journalist, educator
- Parent(s): Robert Pickrell and Eleanor Howard

Jane Temple Howard (May 4, 1935–June 27, 1996) was an American journalist, author, and educator. She worked at Life magazine from 1956 to 1972. She contributed articles to many publications and wrote several books; most well-known was her biography of Margaret Mead.

Jane Howard on the back cover of her first book, Please Touch,1970

== Biography ==
=== Family ===
Howard was born in Springfield, Sangamon County, Illinois, but raised in Winnetka. Her father, Robert Pickrell Howard, (1905-1989) was a historian, a political newsreporter and correspondent for the Chicago Tribune for nearly three decades. Her mother, Eleanor, died in 1971, when Jane was in her mid-thirties; her father remarried later, to Elizabeth Thomas (Appel). She had one sister, Ann and one brother, Henry.

In her 1978 book, "Families," she wrote:

Call it a clan, call it a network, call it a tribe, call it a family. Whatever you call it, whoever you are, you need one.

=== Education ===
Howard attended the University of Michigan, graduating in 1956, with her bachelor's degree. She was awarded two honorary degrees, a Doctor of Letters from Grinnell College in 1979 and a Doctor of Humane Letters, from Hamline University in 1984. As a student, she worked as a reporter and editor for the university newspaper.

=== Career ===
Howard joined Time-Life as a trainee at age 21. She worked for Life magazine from 1956 until 1972 as a reporter, assistant editor, associate editor, and staff writer. Some of her work included interviews with novelists, Vladimir Nabokov, (pen name Vladimir Sirin) Truman Capote, Pulitzer prize-winning author John Updike, and Jacqueline Susann, author of "Valley of the Dolls.

Columbia University, in a brief biography, lists her teaching career, as a '"visiting lecturer at the University of Iowa Writers' Workshop (Fall 1974), the University of Georgia School of Journalism (Spring 1975), Yale University English Department (Spring 1976), and the State University of New York Albany English Department (Winter 1978)"' and '"was a John Steinbeck Writer-in-Residence at Southampton College (Summer 1982), and a James Thurber Writer-in Residence at Ohio State University (Fall 1986)."' In 1989, she was a contributing editor for the monthly women's magazine, Lear's, and conducted interviews that were published in the monthly column, "A Woman for Lear's."

As a freelance writer, Howard wrote articles, published in numerous periodicals including, Smithsonian, Esquire, The Washington Post Book World, Mademoiselle, and The New York Times Book Review.

Howard taught non-fiction writing workshops at the Split Rock Arts Program at the University of Minnesota (Summer, 1989 and 1990); she also taught creative writing at Columbia University, during the 1990s.

=== Death ===
Howard died at her home in Manhattan, from pancreatic cancer. She was survived by her sister, Ann Condon.

== Selected works ==
Columbia University Libraries maintains a collection of her works in their archives including correspondence, manuscripts, drafts, notes, journals, scrapbooks, audio tapes, datebooks and calendars, photographs, printed material, memorabilia, and files containing information about articles that she researched and wrote while on the staff of Life magazine.

=== Articles ===
- Close-up/Marianne Moore, 79, keeps going like sixty, Detached from : Life, vol. 62, no. 2, January 13, 1967 (in book format)

=== Books ===
- Please Touch: a guided tour of the human potential movement, McGraw-Hill, 1st ed.,1970, ISBN 0-3852-8766-6
- A Different Woman, 1st ed., Dutton, 1973, ISBN 0 5250 9310 9
- Families, Transaction Publications, 1998, ©1978, ISBN 0-7658-0468-9
- Margaret Mead: a life, Fawcet Crest, 1985, ISBN 0-4499-0497-0

At the time of her death, Howard was writing a book under the working title Heartland.
