= Charlie Howard (footballer) =

English footballer

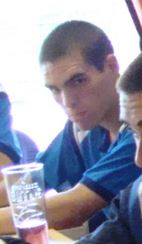

Personal information
- Full name: Charlie Sydney Howard
- Date of birth: 26 November 1989 (age 36)
- Place of birth: Southwark, England
- Height: 6 ft 0 in (1.83 m)
- Position: Midfielder

Youth career
- Gillingham

Senior career*
Years	Team	Apps	(Gls)
2007–2009	Gillingham	1	(0)
2008	→ Dulwich Hamlet (loan)	?	(?)
2008	→ Thurrock (loan)	?	(?)
2009	→ Thurrock (loan)	?	(?)
- * Club domestic league appearances and goals as of 11:14, 1 November 2008 (UTC)

Charlie Sydney Howard (born 26 November 1989 in London) is an English footballer.

He made his senior Gillingham debut in a 4–0 home win in the Football League Trophy southern section quarter final against Dagenham & Redbridge on 3 November 2007. Howard made his full Football League debut at Port Vale on Easter Monday 2008.

In the 2008–09 season, he had loan spells at Dulwich Hamlet and Thurrock (twice). He parted company with Gillingham at the end of the season.
