= Thomas Howard =

Thomas or Tom Howard may refer to:

== Nobility and politicians ==
- Thomas Howard, 2nd Duke of Norfolk (1443–1524), English soldier and statesman
- Thomas Howard, 3rd Duke of Norfolk (1473–1554), Tudor politician
- Lord Thomas Howard (1511–1537), a younger son of the 2nd Duke of Norfolk, half brother of the 3rd Duke, chiefly known for his marriage to Henry VIII's niece, Margaret Douglas
- Thomas Howard, 4th Duke of Norfolk (1536–1572), English nobleman
- Thomas Howard, 5th Duke of Norfolk (1627–1677), English nobleman
- Thomas Howard, 8th Duke of Norfolk (1683–1732), son of Lord Thomas Howard and Mary Elizabeth Savile
- Thomas Howard, 14th Earl of Arundel (1586–1646), English courtier during the reigns of King James I and King Charles I
- Thomas Howard, 1st Earl of Berkshire (1587–1669), second son of Thomas Howard, 1st Earl of Suffolk and Catherine Knyvet
- Thomas Howard, 3rd Earl of Berkshire (1619–1706), English peer
- Thomas Howard, 2nd Earl of Effingham (1714–1763), British nobleman and Army officer
- Thomas Howard, 1st Earl of Suffolk (1561–1626), son of Thomas Howard, 4th Duke of Norfolk by his second wife Margaret Audley
- Thomas Howard (English MP) (died 1682), MP for Haverfordwest
- Thomas Howard, 3rd Earl of Effingham (1746–1791), British nobleman and Army officer
- Thomas Howard, 14th Earl of Suffolk (1721–1783), British peer and politician
- Thomas Howard, 16th Earl of Suffolk (1776–1851), British peer and politician
- Thomas Howard (1651–1701), Teller of the Exchequer and member of parliament
- Thomas Howard (Manitoba politician) (1845–1903), political figure in Manitoba
- Tom Howard (Australian politician) (1880–1949), Australian politician
- Tom Howard (British politician) (1888–1953), British member of parliament for Islington South
- Thomas Howard, 3rd Viscount Howard of Bindon (died 1611), English peer and politician
- Thomas Howard, 1st Viscount Howard of Bindon (c. 1520–1582), English peer and politician

== Sport ==
- Thomas Howard (American football) (1983–2013), American football linebacker
- Thomas Howard (baseball) (born 1964), former outfielder in Major League Baseball
- Thomas Howard (English cricketer) (1781–1864), English professional cricketer who played first-class cricket
- Thomas Howard (Australian cricketer) (1877–1965), Australian cricketer
- Thomas Howard Sr. (born 1954), former American football linebacker who played nine seasons
- Thomas Howard, pseudonym used by the outlaw Jesse James
- Tom Howard (golfer) (1888–1967), Australian professional golfer
- Tom Howard (runner) (born 1948), Canadian Olympic runner
- Tom Howard (wrestler) (born 1969), American professional wrestler, mixed martial artist, kickboxer and actor
- Tom Howard (ice hockey) (1871–1945), Canadian ice hockey player
- Tom Howard (hurler) (born 1962), Irish hurler
- Tommy Howard, Irish referee, see 1993 All-Ireland Senior Football Championship Final

== Other ==
- Thomas Howard (British Army officer, born 1684) (1684–1753), commander of the Buffs
- Thomas Howard (pirate) (fl. 1698–1703), pirate primarily active in the Indian Ocean and the Red Sea during the Golden Age of Piracy
- Thomas Albert Howard, professor of history
- T. Henry Howard (1849–1923), second Chief of the Staff of The Salvation Army
- Thomas B. Howard (1854–1920), U.S. Navy admiral
- Thomas H. Howard (1862–1904), American socialite
- Tom Howard (comedian) (1885–1955), Irish comedian, creator and host of It Pays to Be Ignorant
- Tom Howard (photographer) (1894–1961), photographer who worked at the Washington bureau of P&A Photographs during the 1920s
- Tom Howard (special effects) (1910–1985), British special effects artist
- Tom Howard (attorney) (1917–1965), American attorney who represented Jack Ruby, the killer of Lee Harvey Oswald
- Tom Howard (musician) (1950–2010), American pianist, musical arranger and orchestral conductor
- Thomas Howard, a fictional character played by Robert Pattinson in the 2019 film The Lighthouse
- Thomas Howard (pilot boat), a pilot boat in Philadelphia and Delaware
