= Matt Howard (baseball) =

American baseball player (born 1967)

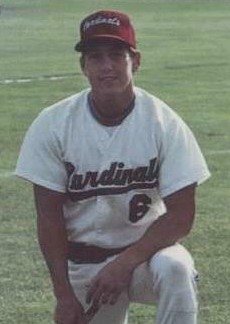
- Second baseman
- Born: September 22, 1967 (age 58); Fall River, Massachusetts, U.S.
- Batted: Right Threw: Right

MLB debut
- May 17, 1996, for the New York Yankees

Last MLB appearance
- September 19, 1996, for the New York Yankees

MLB statistics
- Batting average: .204
- Runs: 9
- Hits: 11
- Stats at Baseball Reference

Teams
- New York Yankees (1996)

Matthew Christopher Howard (born September 22, 1967) is an American former Major League Baseball (MLB) second baseman. He played one season at the major league level for the New York Yankees.

Howard attended Pepperdine University. In 1988, he played collegiate summer baseball with the Orleans Cardinals of the Cape Cod Baseball League and was named a league all-star. He was selected by the Los Angeles Dodgers in the 34th round of the 1989 MLB draft.

Howard played his first professional season with the Rookie league Great Falls Dodgers in 1989, and his last season with the Pittsburgh Pirates' Triple-A affiliate, the Nashville Sounds, in 1999.
