= Elizabeth Howard =

Elizabeth Howard may refer to:

- Elizabeth Boleyn, Countess of Wiltshire (c. 1480–1538), née Elizabeth Howard, mother of Anne Boleyn
- Elizabeth Howard, Duchess of Norfolk (1497–1558), née Stafford, wife of Thomas Howard, 2nd Duke of Norfolk
- Elizabeth Leyburn (1536–1567), wife of Thomas Howard, 4th Duke of Norfolk
- Elizabeth Howard, Countess of Carrick (1564—1646), English aristocrat and courtier
- Elizabeth Manners, Duchess of Rutland (1780–1825), born Elizabeth Howard
- Elizabeth Howard (d. 1658), Countess of Banbury
- Elizabeth Jane Howard (1923–2014), English writer
- Elizabeth Tilney, Countess of Surrey (died 1497), married name Elizabeth Howard
- Elizabeth Howard, Countess of Effingham (died 1791)
- Liz Howard, 27th president of the Camogie Association
- Liz Howard (writer) (born 1985), Canadian writer
- Elizabeth Howard, proprietor of the Encore Dinner Theatre, Tustin, California

== See also ==
- Emily Elizabeth Howard, character
