= USS Effingham =

Two ships in the United States Navy have been named USS Effingham:

- USS Effingham, a frigate under construction for the Continental Navy, but burned before she ever saw service. Named for Thomas Howard, 3rd Earl of Effingham - an English nobleman who resigned his commission rather than fight an unjust war against the American colonists.
- USS Effingham (APA-165), a transport used during World War II, and named for Effingham County, Georgia and Effingham County, Illinois.
