= Life Guards (United Kingdom) =

British military unit

The Life Guards
- Cap badge of the regiment
- Active: 21 May 1922 (Note: The current 'Life Guards' were raised in 1922 following reductions to the Cavalry Corps. The regiment's predecessors, the 1st and 2nd Life Guards, have their roots dating back to 1660.)–present
- Allegiance: United Kingdom
- Branch: British Army
- Type: Horse Guards
- Role: Armoured reconnaissance and ceremonial
- Size: Regiment
- Part of: Household Cavalry
- Garrison/HQ: HCMR – London; HCR – Bulford Camp
- Mottos: Honi soit qui mal y pense (Middle French for 'Shame on him who thinks evil of it')
- March: Quick: "Milanollo"; Slow: "Life Guards Slow March"; Trot past: "Keel Row"

Commanders
- Colonel-in-Chief: King Charles III
- Colonel of the Regiment: Lt Gen Sir Edward Smyth-Osbourne

Insignia
- Tactical Recognition Flash
- Abbreviation: LG

The Life Guards (LG) is the most senior regiment of the British Army and part of the Household Cavalry, along with The Blues and Royals.

== History ==
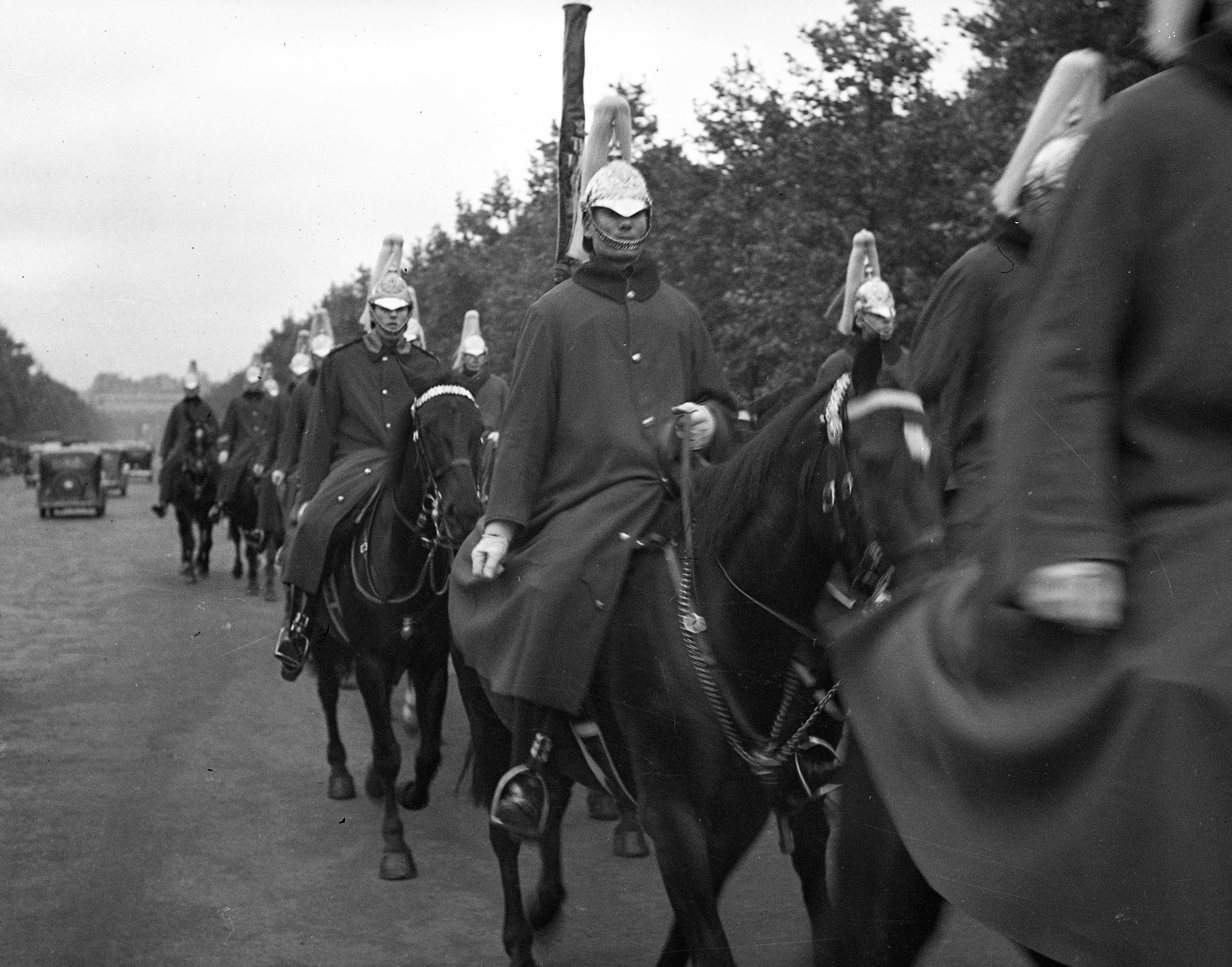
Regimental troops parading on The Mall, 1938

The Life Guards grew from the four troops of Horse Guards (exclusively formed of gentleman rankers until the transformation of the last two remaining troops into Regiments of Life Guards in 1788) raised by Charles II around the time of his restoration, plus two troops of Horse Grenadier Guards (rank and file composed of commoners), which were raised some years later.

- The first troop was originally raised in Bruges in 1658 as His Majesty's Own Troop of Horse Guards. They formed part of the contingent raised by the exiled King Charles II as his contribution to the army of King Philip IV of Spain who were fighting the French and their allies the English Commonwealth under the Lord Protector Oliver Cromwell in the Franco-Spanish War and the concurrent Anglo-Spanish War.
- The second troop was founded in 1659 as Monck's Life Guards.
- The third troop, like the first troop was formed in 1658 from exiled Royalists and was initially known as The Duke of York's Troop of Horse Guards.
- The fourth troop was raised in 1661 in England.
- The first troop of horse grenadier guards was formed in 1693 from the amalgamation of three troops of grenadiers.
- The second troop of horse grenadier guards was raised in Scotland in 1702.

These units first saw action during the Third Anglo-Dutch War in 1672 and then at the Battle of Sedgemoor during the Monmouth Rebellion in 1685.

The 3rd and 4th troops were disbanded in 1746. In 1788, the remaining 1st and 2nd troops, along with the two troops of Horse Grenadier Guards, were reorganised into two regiments, the 1st and 2nd Regiments of Life Guards (from 1877, simply 1st Life Guards and 2nd Life Guards). From then on (1788), rank and file were mostly formed of commoners giving rise to their pejorative nickname: "the cheesemongers", while the bulk of the gentlemen-troopers were pensioned off.

From 1812 to 1814, two squadrons from each of the Life Guard regiments served in the Peninsular War. In 1815 they were part of The Household Brigade at the Battle of Waterloo under Major-General Lord Edward Somerset. This would be their last active service for more than 60 years, during which time they performed ceremonial and public order duties in London.

In 1821, the Life Guards under the command of Captain Oakes fired upon mourners trying to redirect the funeral procession of Queen Caroline through the city of London. Two civilians were killed. Though charges of manslaughter and murder were brought, no Life Guards were prosecuted.

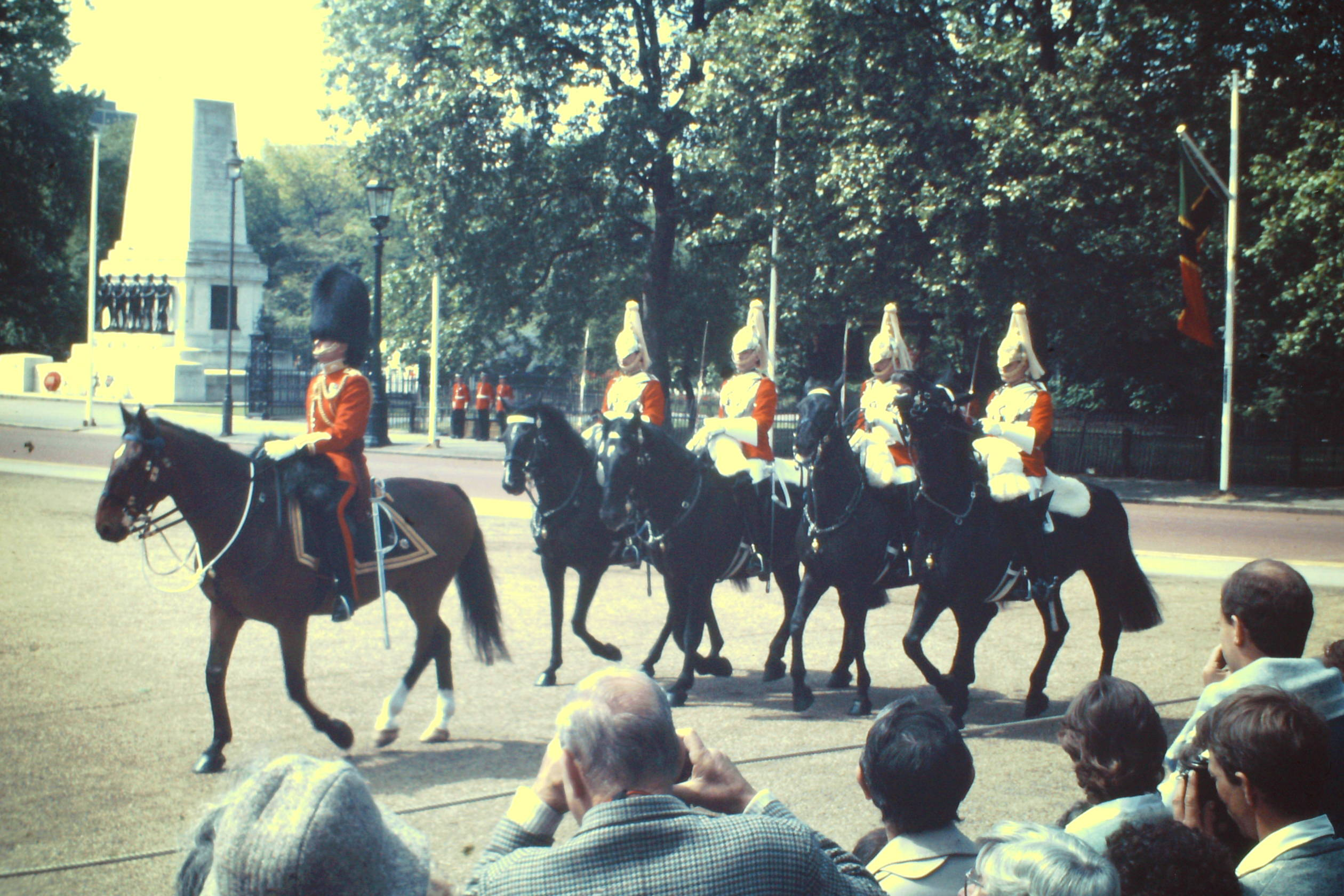
Regimental troops parading on The Mall, 1985

Elements of the Life Guards, along with the Royal Horse Guards, formed the Household Cavalry Composite Regiment (HCCR) for active service. The HCCR was in action in the Anglo-Egyptian War of 1882 and the Second Boer War of 1899 to 1902. The HCCR was mobilized again in 1914 at the start of the First World War, where they formed part of the British Expeditionary Force and fought in most of the major battles on the Western Front.

In 1918, the two Life Guards regiments gave up their horses and were re-roled as machine gun battalions, becoming the 1st and 2nd Battalions, Guards Machine Gun Regiment. They reverted to their previous names and roles after the end of the war. In 1922, the two regiments were merged into one regiment, The Life Guards (1st and 2nd). In 1928, it was re-designated The Life Guards.

During the Second World War, again forming part of the HCCR, the Life Guards undertook armoured reconnaissance duties in Palestine, Iraq, Iran, Egypt and Italy. In 1944, the Life Guards took part in the Normandy landings and the advance through France to liberate Brussels. In the late 1940s, they were deployed to the Middle East, initially in Egypt, garrisoned at Kasr-el-Nil Barracks in Cairo from 1946 to 1947, and then in Palestine from 1947. In 1948, the unit left the Middle East and returned to England on leave. In 1952, it returned to Germany as part of the 11th Armoured Division.

Throughout the 1950s and 1960s, the unit repeatedly rotated from Britain to Germany. In 1965, the unit was deployed to Asia for the first time in central Malaysia until 1968, returning to England. Like in the past decades, the unit was stationed in West Germany and England through the early to late 1970s. During its deployments, the unit always maintained a squadron in London conducting public duties. In 1971, several squadrons were deployed to Northern Ireland during The Troubles, and the regiment would see action there several more times through the mid-1970s. In March 1979, B Squadron was deployed to Cyprus as part of the United Nations Peacekeeping Force, and this would become another location that components of the unit would be deployed to.

In 1980, the unit's headquarters would be moved from Combermere Barracks in Windsor to Lothian Barracks in Detmold, North Rhine-Westphalia, West Germany as a part of the 4th Armoured Division of the British Army of the Rhine, in a heavy armoured role equipped with Chieftain MBT, and also tasked with the defense of part of the North German Plain. In January 1981 it became a component of the 20th Armoured Brigade. The unit provided a mounted escort for then Charles, Prince of Wales and then Lady Diana Spencer during their wedding ceremony on 29 July 1981, in London. Throughout the rest of the 1980s-1990s, its headquarters moved frequently from Germany to Britain, and in January 1984 had squadrons deployed to Cyprus as part of a UN tour. In 1990–1991, the Life Guards saw action with their Challenger 1 tanks in the Gulf War.

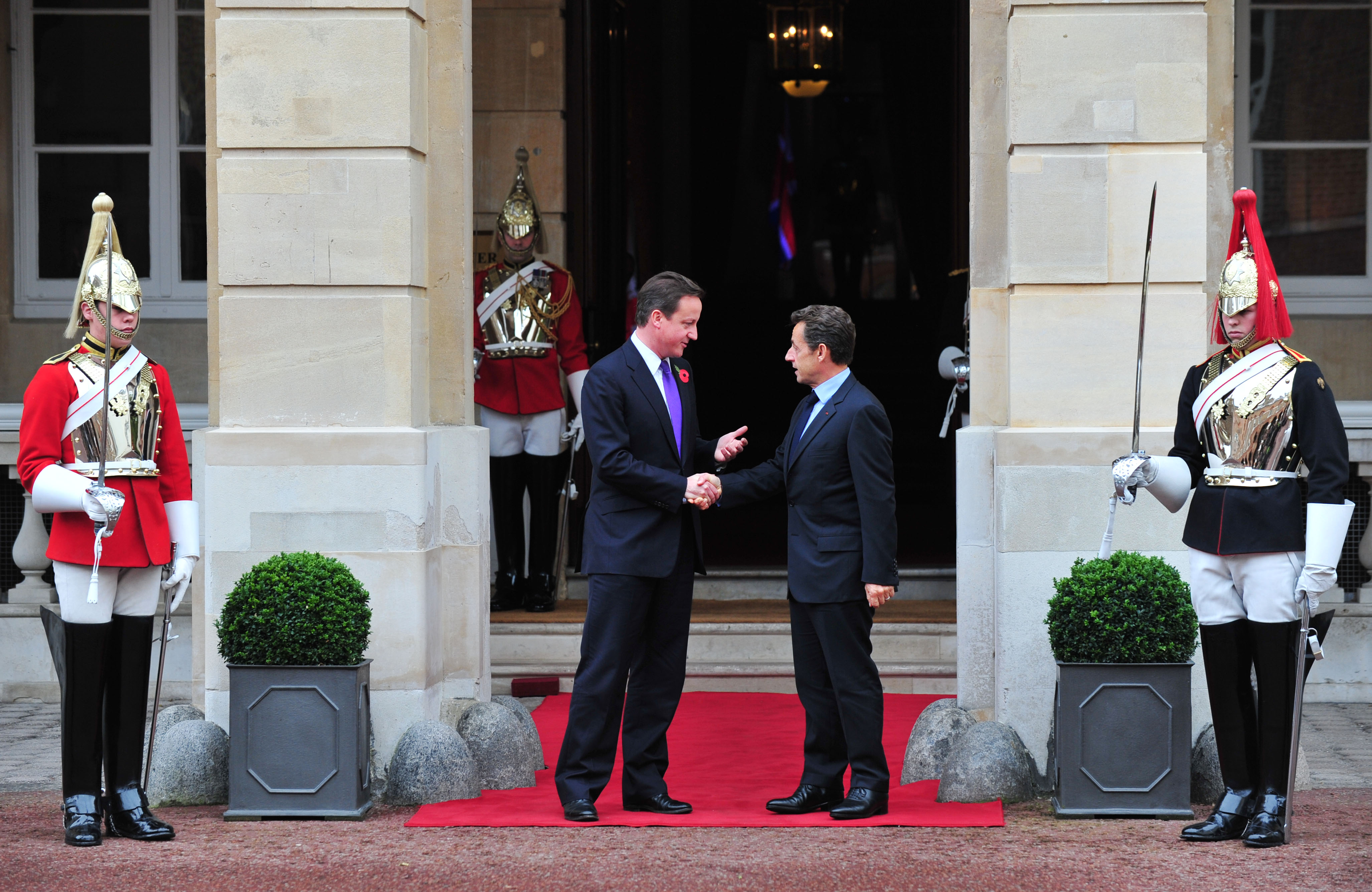
Regimental soldiers (left) at Lancaster House, 2010

In 1992, as part of the Options for Change defence review, The Life Guards were joined with the Blues and Royals in a 'Union', becoming part of the new Household Cavalry, classified as a corps, not an amalgamation, forming the Household Cavalry Regiment (armoured reconnaissance) and the Household Cavalry Mounted Regiment (ceremonial duties). However, both units maintain their regimental identity, with distinct uniforms and traditions, and their own colonel. Like The Blues and Royals, they have a peculiar non-commissioned rank structure: In brief, they lack sergeants, replacing them with multiple grades of corporal. Since the union, the Household Cavalry Regiment has seen active service in the Balkans, Iraq and Afghanistan.

In 2018, the Life Guards began admitting women. In 2020, Elizabeth Godwin became the first woman to be commissioned as an officer in the Life Guards.

=== Previous names ===
Names used by the regiment were as follows:

- From 1788, 1st Regiment of Life Guards and 2nd Regiment of Life Guards
  - The following troops were reorganised into 1st Regiment of Life Guards
    - 1st Troop of Horse Guards
    - 1st Troop, Horse Grenadier Guards
  - and the following troops were reorganised into 2nd Regiment of Life Guards
    - 2nd Troop of Horse Guards
    - 2nd Troop (Scots), Horse Grenadier Guards
- From 1877, 1st Life Guards and 2nd Life Guards
- From 1922, The Life Guards (1st and 2nd)
- From 1928, The Life Guards

== Uniform ==
Troopers in full dress uniform

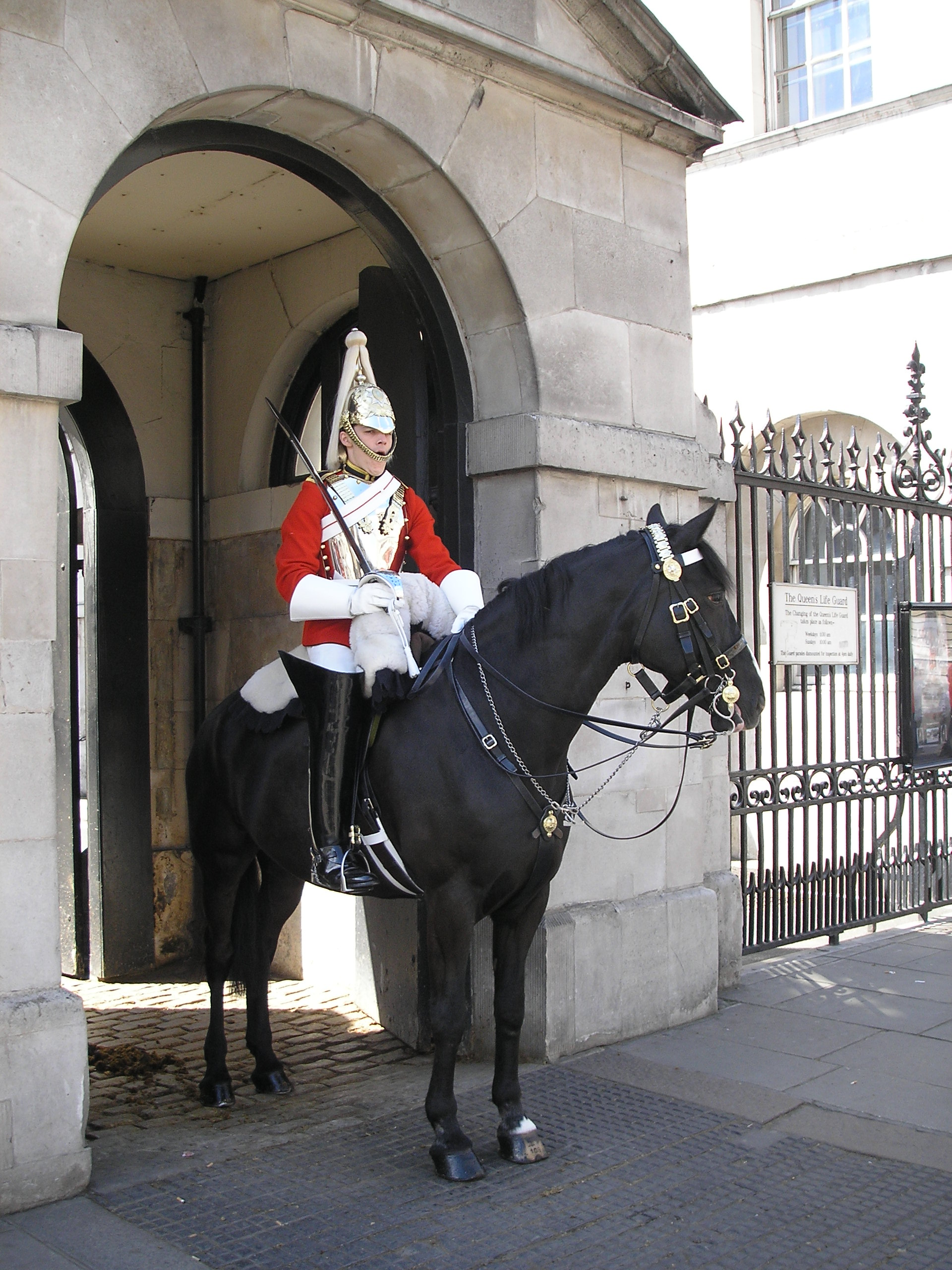
Mounted, with cuirass

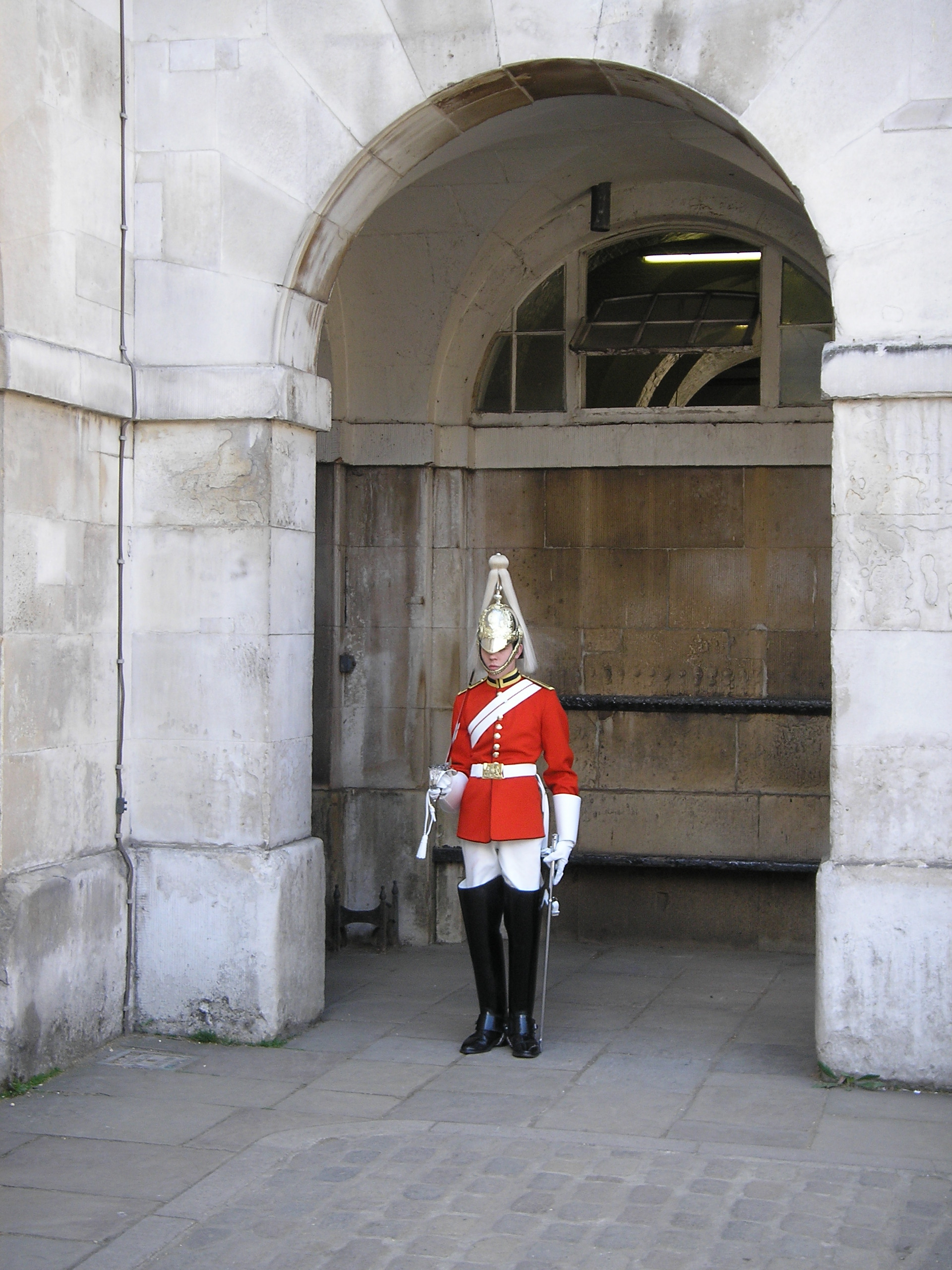
Dismounted, without cuirass

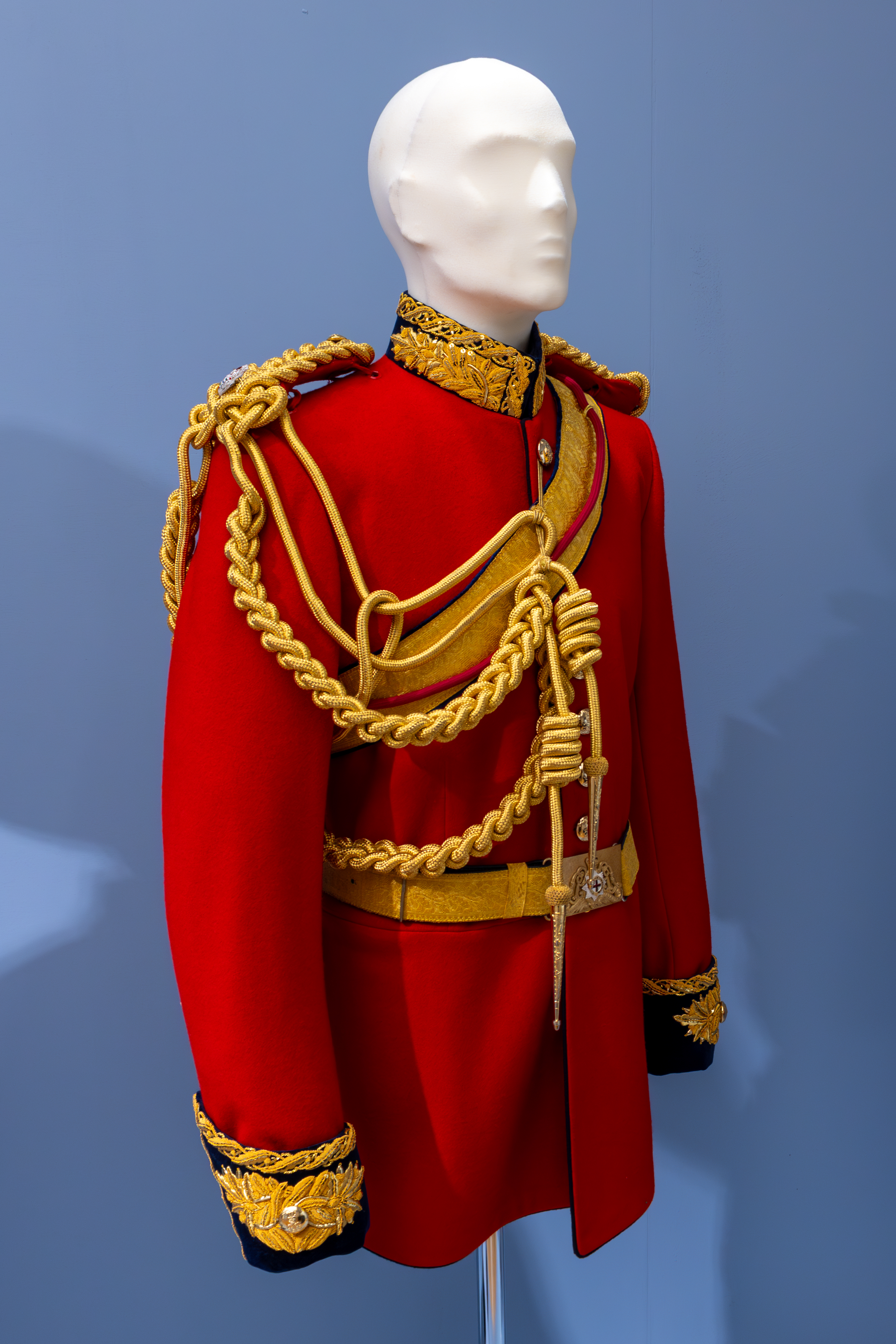
Full dress tunic worn by an officer

On ceremonial occasions, The Life Guards wear a scarlet tunic, a metal cuirass and a matching helmet with a white plume worn bound on the top into an 'onion' shape; the exceptions to this are the regiment's trumpeters, who wear a red plume, and farriers, who wear blue tunics and have a black plume. In addition, The Life Guards wear their chin strap below their lower lip, as opposed to The Blues and Royals, who wear it under their chin. On service dress, The Life Guards Officers and Warrant Officers Class One wear a red lanyard on the right shoulder, as well as a Sam Browne belt. The Life Guards, as part of the Household Division, does not use the Order of the Bath Star for its officer rank "pips", but rather the Order of the Garter Star.

== Battle honours ==
The battle honours are: [combined battle honours of 1st Life Guards and 2nd Life Guards, with the following emblazoned]: (Note: The regiment maintained the fiction of separate regiments until 1928, receiving in 1927 two separate sets of Standards with different (but almost identical) battle honours emblazoned.)

- Dettingen, Peninsula, Waterloo, Tel-el-Kebir, Egypt 1882, Relief of Kimberley, Paardeberg, South Africa 1899–1900
- The Great War: (Note: Revised combined list issued May 1933, omitting from emblazonment "Passchendaele" and "St. Quentin Canal" of the 1st Life Guards.) Mons, Le Cateau, Marne 1914, Aisne 1914, Messines 1914, Ypres 1914, Passchendaele 1917 '18, Somme 1916 '18, Arras 1917 '18, Hindenburg Line, France and Flanders 1914–18
- The Second World War: (Note: Awarded jointly to The Life Guards and Blues and Royals, for services of Household Cavalry Regiment.) Mont Pincon, Souleuvre, Noireau Crossing, Amiens 1944, Brussels, Neerpelt, Nederrijn, Nijmegen, Lingen, Bentheim, North-West Europe 1944-45, Baghdad 1941, Iraq 1941, Palmyra, Syria 1941, El Alamein, North Africa 1942–43, Arezzo, Advance to Florence, Gothic Line, Italy 1944
- Wadi al Batin, Gulf 1991, Al Basrah, Iraq 2003.

== Commanding officers ==
The Commanding Officers of the regiment have been:

- Lt Col Emerson M. Turnbull: November 1959 – April 1962
- Lt Col Julian P. Fane: April 1962 – May 1964
- Lt Col Sir James W. Scott: May 1964 – October 1966
- Lt Col Ian B. Baillie: October 1966 – May 1969
- Lt Col Henry Desmond A. Langley: May 1969 – September 1971
- Lt Col Simon E. M. Bradish-Ellammes: December 1971 – December 1973
- Lt Col Simon C. Cooper: December 1973 – August 1976
- Lt Col Andrew J. Hartigan: August 1976 – October 1978
- Lt Col Arthur B. S. H. Gooch: October 1978 – February 1981
- Lt Col James B. Emson: February 1981 – July 1983
- Lt Col Timothy J. Earl: July 1983 – November 1985
- Lt Col V. Anthony L. Goodhew: November 1985 – June 1988
- Lt Col James W. M. Ellery: June 1988 – December 1990
- Lt Col Anthony P. de Ritter: December 1990 – October 1992

== Colonels-in-Chief ==
Since consolidation into a single regiment, the Colonel-in-Chief of the regiment has always been the monarch, as follows:

- 21 May 1922 – 20 January 1936: King George V
- 20 January 1936 – 10 December 1936: King Edward VIII
- 10 December 1936 – 6 February 1952: King George VI
- 6 February 1952 – 8 September 2022: Queen Elizabeth II
- 8 September 2022 — present: King Charles III

== Regimental Colonels ==
The Regimental Colonels were:

- 1922: Major General Sir Cecil Edward Bingham GCVO KCMG CB (from 2nd Life Guards; Joint Colonel)
- 1922: Field Marshal Edmund Henry Hynman Allenby, 1st Viscount Allenby GCB GCMG GCVO KStJ (from 1st Life Guards; Joint Colonel)
- 1936–1957: Major General Alexander Cambridge, 1st Earl of Athlone KG GCB GCMG GCVO DSO KStJ PC ADC FRS
- 1957–1965: Field Marshal John Harding, 1st Baron Harding of Petherton GCB CBE DSO** MC
- 1965–1979: Lieutenant General Louis Mountbatten, 1st Earl Mountbatten of Burma KG GCB OM GCSI GCIE GCVO DSO GCStJ PC ADC
- 1979–1999: Major General Lord Michael Fitzalan-Howard GCVO CB CBE MC DL
- 1999–2019: Field Marshal Charles Guthrie, Baron Guthrie of Craigiebank GCB GCVO OBE DL
- 2019–present: Lieutenant General Sir Edward Smyth-Osbourne KCVO CBE

== Order of precedence ==
Preceded by First in Order of Precedence of the Cavalry	Cavalry Order of Precedence	Succeeded by The Blues and Royals (Royal Horse Guards and 1st Dragoons)

== Gallery ==
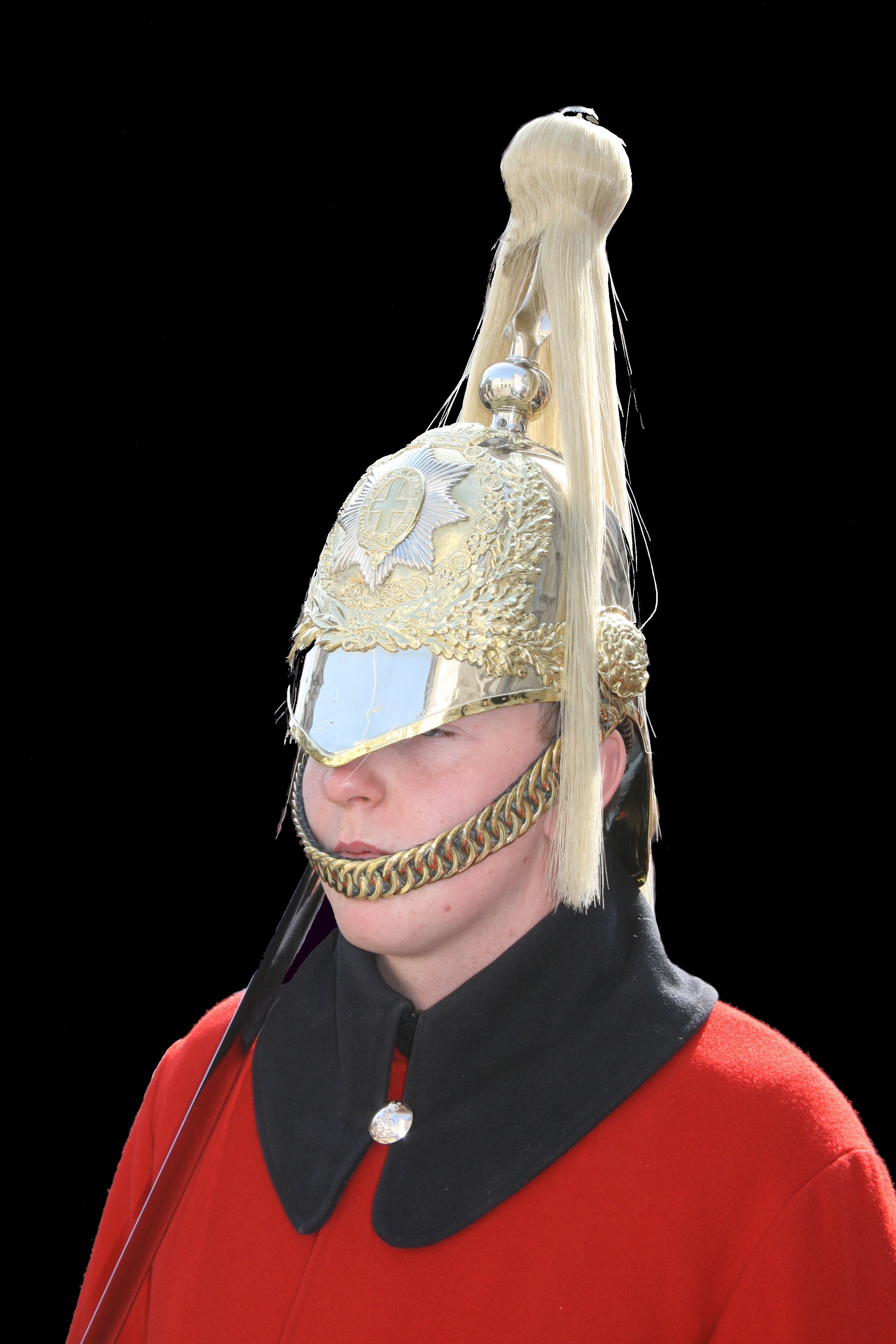
Life Guard (close up of helmet and plume)

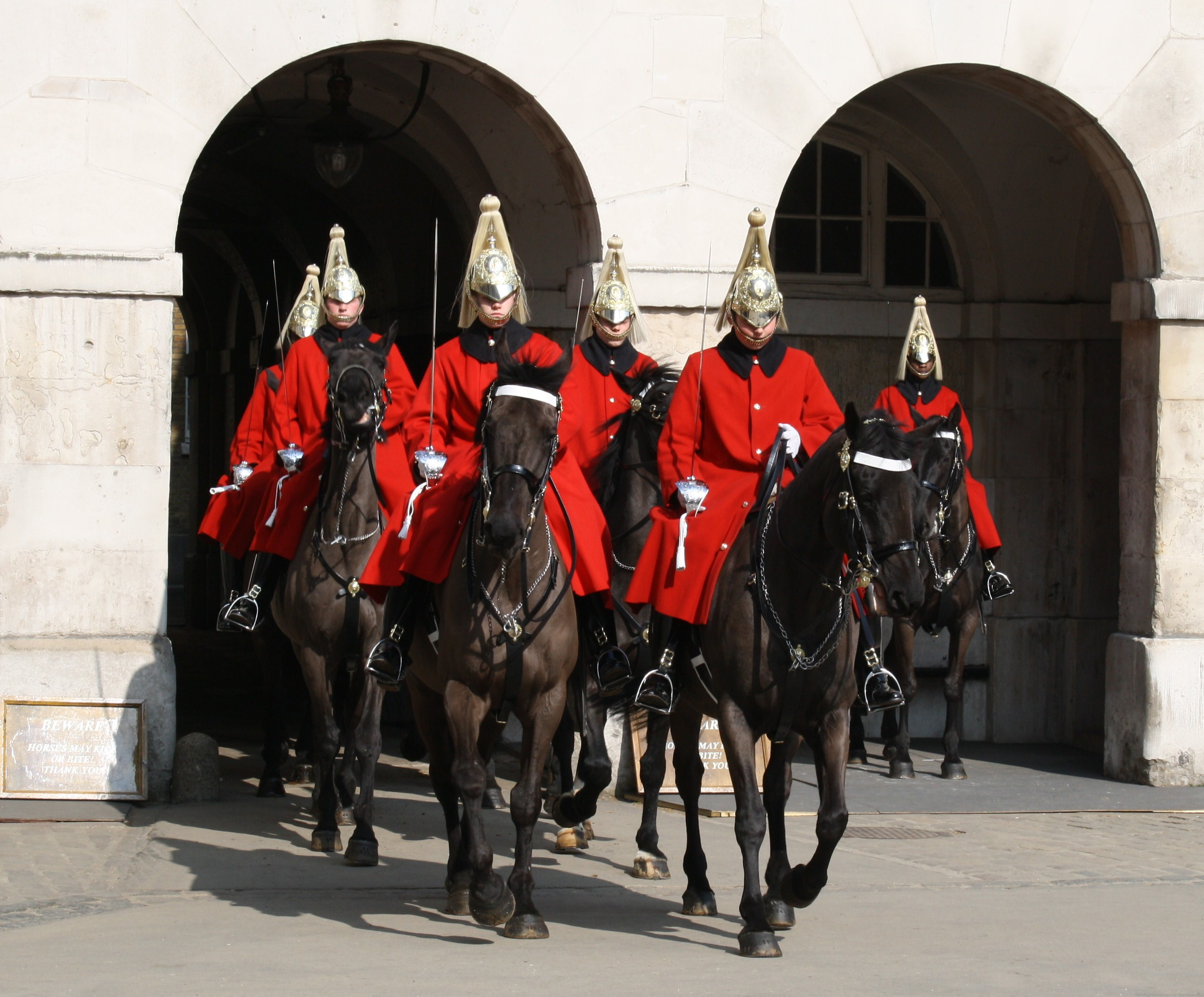
Life Guards (wearing cloaks over full dress uniform)

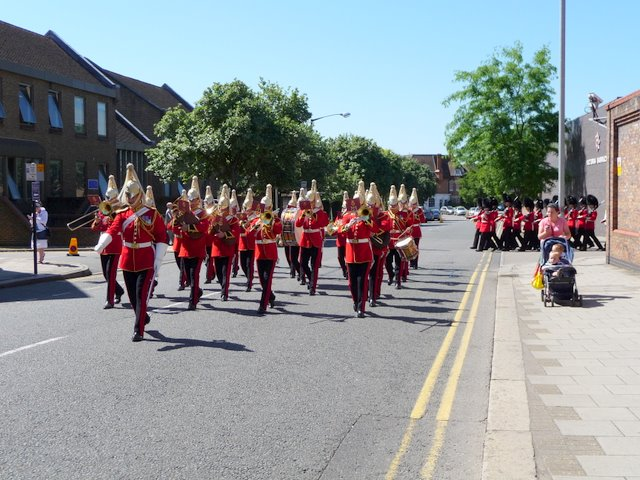
The Band of The Life Guards

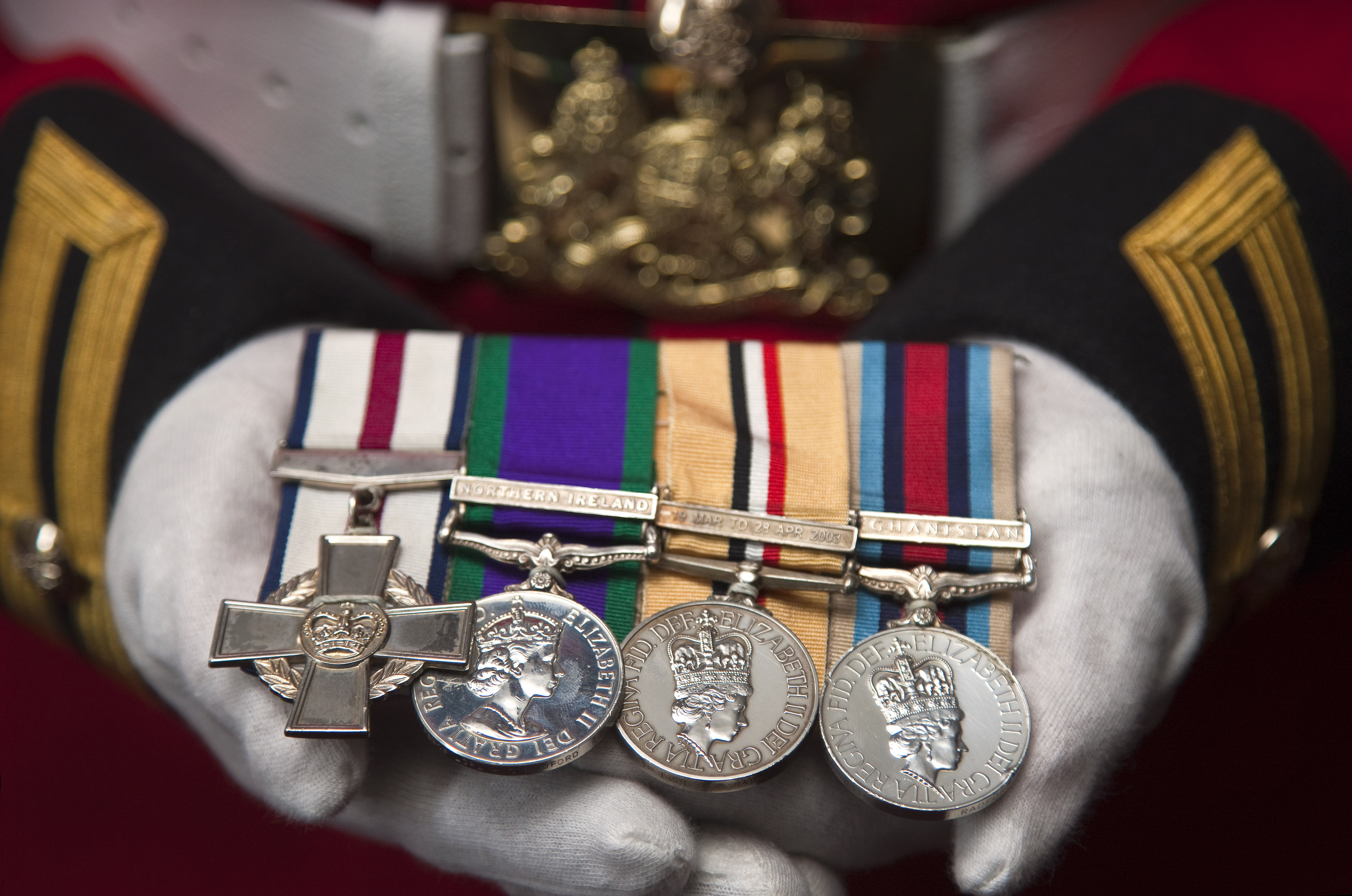
Group of medals belonging to Andrew Radford CGC including Conspicuous Gallantry Cross
