= Elizabeth Howard, Countess of Effingham =

English noble (1725–1791)

The Right Honourable The Countess of Effingham
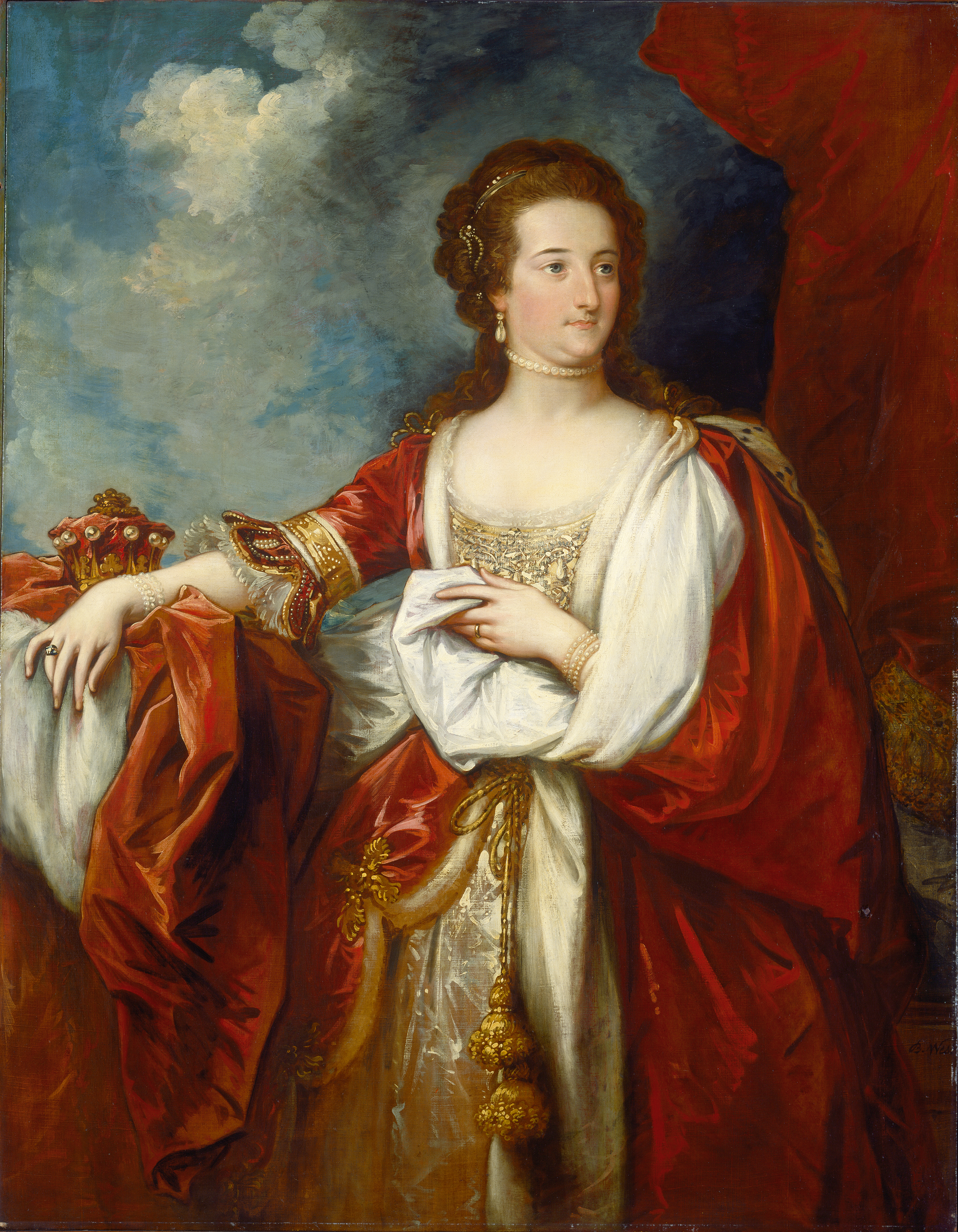
- The Countess of Effingham by Benjamin West, 1797
- Born: 1725
- Died: 12 December 1791 (aged 65–66)
- Spouse: Thomas Howard, 2nd Earl of Effingham
- Issue: 5, including Thomas and Richard
- Father: Peter Beckford
- Mother: Bathsuba Hering

Elizabeth Howard, Countess of Effingham (née Beckford; died 12 October 1791) was the wife of Thomas Howard, 2nd Earl of Effingham, and the mother of both Thomas Howard, 3rd Earl of Effingham, and Richard Howard, 4th Earl of Effingham.

She was born in 1725 to Peter Beckford, the Speaker of Jamaica's House of Assembly, and his wife, the former Bathsuba Hering. Her brother was William Beckford, who was Lord Mayor of London on two occasions.

She married the Earl on 14 February 1745.

In addition to Thomas Howard and Richard Howard, their children included:

- Lady Elizabeth Howard (d. 31 Oct 1815), who married Rt. Rev. Henry Reginald Courtenay and had children
- Lady Anne Howard (d. 1787), who married Lt Col Christopher Carleton
- Lady Maria Howard (1753-1836), who married Guy Carleton, 1st Baron Dorchester, and had children

The Earl died in 1763, and the Countess remarried on 21 May 1771, her second husband being Field Marshal Sir George Howard, a relation of the earl. There were no children from this second marriage.

From 1761 until her own death in 1791, she was a Lady of the Bedchamber to Charlotte of Mecklenburg-Strelitz, queen of George III of the United Kingdom.

She died at the Royal Hospital Chelsea, where her second husband was governor. By coincidence, her daughter-in-law Catherine died within a few days of her, while travelling from her home in Jamaica by sea to New York. Elizabeth's elder son, Catherine's husband, who had inherited the earldom, died only a few weeks later.

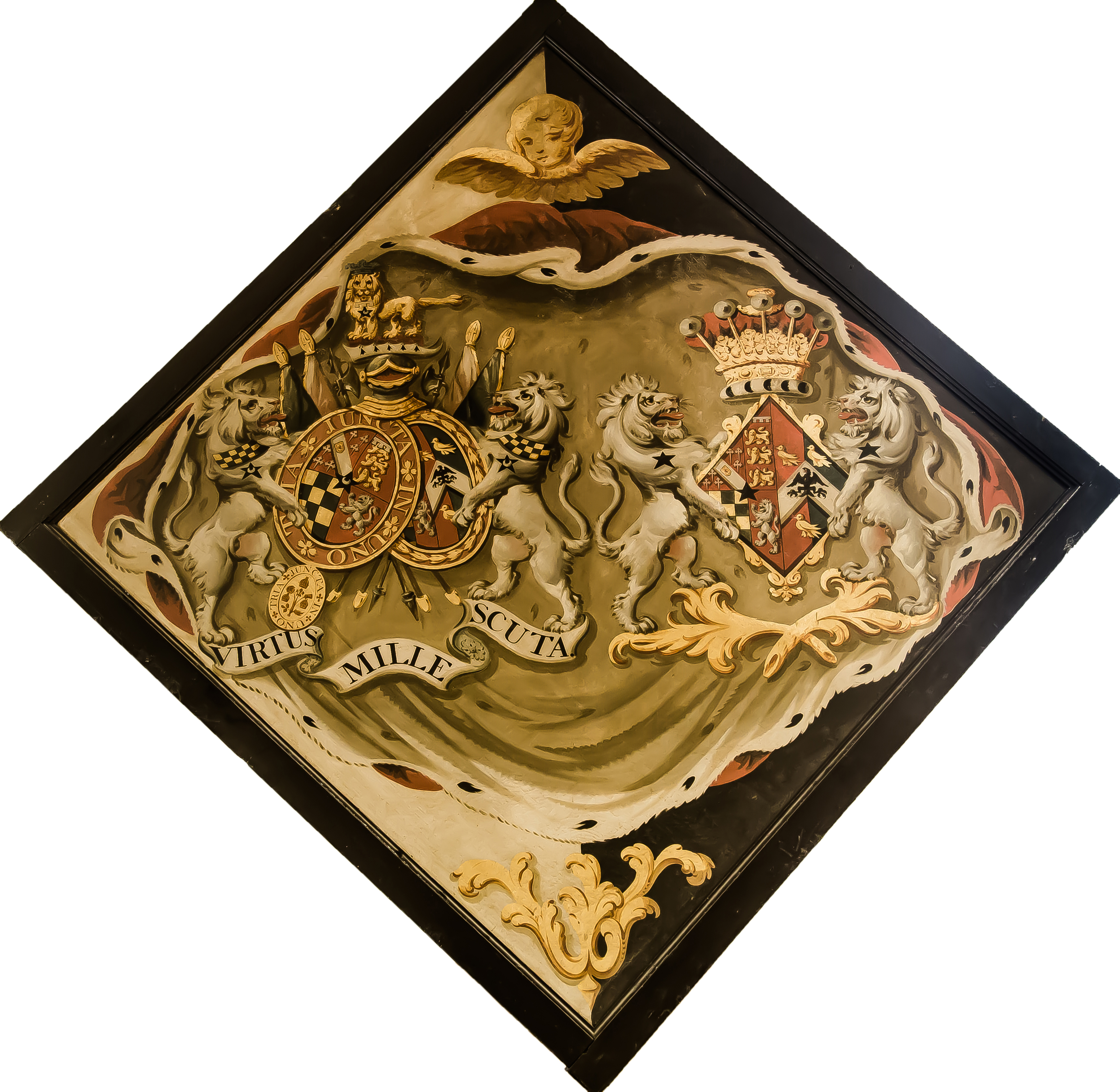
Funeral hatchment in Church of St Giles, Stoke Poges
