= Anne Howard, Countess of Effingham =

Anne Howard, Countess of Effingham (27 January 1695 – 15 November 1774), formerly Anne (or Annie) Bristow, was the second wife of Francis Howard, 1st Earl of Effingham.

She was the daughter of Robert Bristow, MP. Her brothers Robert and John also became MPs; Robert was also Clerk of the Board of Green Cloth.

She married the earl on 23 May 1728. His first wife, Diana, had produced an heir, Thomas, but Anne had no surviving children. The couple's only child, George, was born in 1730 and died in 1731.

In 1736, the countess was appointed a Lady of the Bedchamber to the Princess of Wales, Augusta of Saxe-Gotha.

Her portrait was painted by William Hoare of Bath.
