= Thomas Howard, 2nd Earl of Effingham =

British Army officer

Lieutenant-General The Right Honourable The Earl of Effingham
- Born: 1714
- Died: 19 November 1763 (aged 48–49)
- Noble family: House of Howard-Effingham
- Spouse: Elizabeth Beckford
- Issue: Lady Elizabeth Howard; Thomas Howard, 3rd Earl of Effingham; Richard Howard, 4th Earl of Effingham
- Father: Francis Howard, 1st Earl of Effingham
- Mother: Diana O'Farrell

Lieutenant-General Thomas Howard, 2nd Earl of Effingham (1714 – 19 November 1763), styled Lord Howard from 1731 to 1743, was a British Army officer, the son of Francis Howard, 1st Earl of Effingham.

Lord Howard was appointed a deputy lieutenant of the West Riding of Yorkshire on 19 February 1734. On 7 January 1739, he was commissioned a guidon in the 2nd Troop of Horse Grenadier Guards, of which his father was then captain and colonel. He was promoted first lieutenant and captain on 10 May 1740. Upon his father's death in February 1743, he succeeded him as Earl of Effingham, and subsequently as Deputy Earl Marshal. On 11 April 1743, Effingham was made first lieutenant and lieutenant-colonel in the 2nd Troop of Horse Guards.

Effingham (as he was now known) married Elizabeth Beckford, daughter of Peter Beckford and sister of the politician William Beckford, on 14 February 1745. The couple's children included:

- Thomas Howard, 3rd Earl of Effingham (1747–1791)
- Richard Howard, 4th Earl of Effingham (1748–1816)

Effingham was appointed an aide-de-camp to king George II on 20 August 1749. He received the colonelcy of the 34th Regiment of Foot on 2 December 1754. He was promoted major-general on 15 January 1758 and lieutenant-general on 22 February 1760. George II died on 25 Oct 1760. Less than a week later, on 30 October 1760, Effingham left the 34th to become Captain and Colonel of the 1st Troop Horse Grenadier Guards.

Early in the reign of the new king, Effingham, who held the position of Deputy Earl Marshal due to being a Protestant and a member of the Howard family, was entrusted with organizing the Coronation of George III and Charlotte. By every account, the event was badly organized. When the king remonstrated with Effingham, he admitted that there had been "some neglect," but that he would make sure that the next coronation would be organised properly (when, of course, the king would be dead). King George, who was twenty-two years old at this time (while Effingham was forty-seven), was highly amused by the answer and made Effingham repeat it several times over.

Effingham was unable to keep his word to the king. He died two years after the coronation of George III. He was succeeded in his peerages by his eldest son, Thomas.

Political offices
Preceded by The Earl of Effingham	Deputy Earl Marshal; 1743–1763	Succeeded by The Earl of Suffolk
Military offices
Preceded by Charles Russell	Colonel of the 34th Regiment of Foot; 1754–1760	Succeeded by Lord Frederick Cavendish
Preceded by Richard Onslow	Captain and Colonel of the 1st Troop Horse Grenadier Guards; 1760–1763	Succeeded by Viscount Cantelupe
Peerage of Great Britain
Preceded by Francis Howard	Earl of Effingham; 1743–1763	Succeeded by Thomas Howard
