= Francis Howard, 1st Earl of Effingham =

British Army general (1683–1743)

Brigadier-General The Right Honourable The Earl of Effingham
- Born: 1683
- Died: 12 February 1743 (aged 59)
- Noble family: House of Howard-Effingham
- Spouses: Diana O'Farrell (1713–?); Anne Bristow (1728–1743)
- Issue: Thomas Howard, 2nd Earl of Effingham
- Father: Francis Howard, 5th Baron Howard of Effingham
- Mother: Philadelphia Pelham

Francis Howard, 1st Earl of Effingham (20 October 1683 – 12 February 1743) was an English peer and army officer.

Francis was the second son of Francis Howard, 5th Baron Howard of Effingham. On 26 July 1722, he was commissioned captain and lieutenant-colonel in the 3rd Regiment of Foot Guards. Howard succeeded as Baron Howard of Effingham in 1725, with the death of his older brother Thomas Howard.

He continued to rise in the Army, and was made lieutenant and lieutenant-colonel in the 1st Troop of Horse Grenadier Guards on 15 July 1731. He was created Earl of Effingham on 8 December of that year, and made a Deputy Earl Marshal on 13 December. The next year, on 22 July 1732, he received the colonelcy of a regiment of foot, which he held until 1737. On 21 June 1737, he became Captain and Colonel of the 2nd Troop Horse Grenadier Guards, with the rank of a colonel of horse, and was promoted brigadier-general on 2 July 1739. On 22 December 1740, he became Captain and Colonel of the 4th Troop of Horse Guards. He died in February 1743, and was succeeded by his eldest son Thomas (the son of his first wife Diana), then an officer in the Horse Grenadier Guards.

Political offices
Preceded by The Earl of Sussex	Deputy Earl Marshal; 1731–1743	Succeeded by The Earl of Effingham
Military offices
Preceded by Hon. William Egerton	Colonel of The Earl of Effingham's; Regiment of Foot; 1732–1737	Succeeded by Richard St George
Preceded by Hon. Henry Berkeley	Captain and Colonel of the 2nd Troop Horse Grenadier Guards; 1737–1740	Succeeded by The Earl of Crawford
Preceded by The Viscount Shannon	Captain and Colonel of the 4th (Scots) Troop Horse Guards; 1740–1743	Succeeded by The Earl of Crawford
Peerage of Great Britain
New creation	Earl of Effingham; 1731–1743	Succeeded by Thomas Howard
Peerage of England
Preceded by Thomas Howard	Baron Howard of Effingham; 1725–1743	Succeeded by Thomas Howard
