= 4th Troop of Horse Guards =

Former military unit

The 4th Troop of Horse Guards was the Scottish unit within the Horse Guards Regiment. It was part of the United Kingdom military establishment from 1709 to 1746, but before the Union of the Parliaments, it had been an independent unit in Scotland, sometimes referred to in modern works as the Scots Troop of Horse. The unit's establishment is usually dated to 1661, although its antecedents extend back to the fifteenth century.

== The mounted Guard before 1650 ==
The recorded history of the royal guard in Scotland dates from the 1440s, when Sir Patrick Gray is recorded as captain of the guard under King James II. A regular succession of captains is recorded from then on, but the size and organization of the unit changed several times: in 1584 it was a small mounted escort of forty veteran troopers, its lowest recorded strength, but in 1594 it reached what was probably its largest size, mustering four cavalry troops plus 400 infantry. Although the guard was retained in Scotland after the Union of the Crowns, the unit was downsized to just ten men in 1609, and it seems to have been disbanded in 1628.

After 1628, there seems to have been no separate Guard in Scotland, although when Charles I raised a Life Guard to fight in the English Civil War, it incorporated a sizable Scottish contingent, including the commanding officer, Lord Bernard Stewart.

== The Life Guard, 1650-1709 ==
In 1650, when Charles II landed in Scotland, a mounted regiment of Life Guards was formed, with the Earl of Eglinton as Colonel or Captain-General, and Viscount Newburgh as lieutenant-colonel and as captain of the bodyguard troop. Eglinton was captured early in 1651, but the Life Guard appears to have fought at the Battle of Worcester, after which Newburgh escaped into exile.

After the Restoration, Newburgh mustered a revived bodyguard troop in Edinburgh in March 1661, numbering four officers, five NCOs, and 120 troopers, plus a surgeon and clerk, three trumpeters and a drummer. This was a prestige unit, in which the lowest-ranking NCOs held captains' commissions from the Civil War, and the lowliest troopers were gentlemen's sons. It ranked as the senior unit of Scotland's new standing army.

At the same time, a second troop of guards was raised, commanded directly by the Lord High Commissioner, effectively the Scottish viceroy for the absent king in London, who was also Captain-General of the army. When the Earl of Rothes fell from office in 1667, he retained command of his troop along with the ceremonial dignity of Lord Chancellor, but the unit was disbanded in 1676 due to military cost-cutting and replaced in its ceremonial role by the volunteer Company of Archers. Two years later, the officers of the disbanded troop formed a new unit separate from the life guard, the first of several Independent Troops of Horse which were combined into a regiment in 1682.

From 1676 onwards, the Scottish life guard consisted effectively of a single troop, usually identified as the "Troop of Life Guard" or "Life Guard of Horse", but it could be described as a nominal "Royal Regiment of Horse Guards" in the reign of James VII and II, and its officers were now explicitly regarded as the equivalent of regimental field officers, led by the "Colonel and Captain".

In 1688, during the Glorious Revolution, all but one of the officers remained loyal to King James, or at the very least, resigned their commissions; but William of Orange quickly appointed the Earl of Drumlanrig to command a reconstituted Scots Troop. From 1690, they were based in England, initially as a bodyguard for Queen Mary while the English Life Guards were with William in Ireland. They did not deploy to Scotland until 1697.

In 1709, due to the full merger of the separate English and Scottish armies, the unit was transferred to the British establishment, where it was designated as the 4th Troop of Horse Guards.

== 4th Troop of Horse Guards ==
Before 1709, two other troops on the English establishment had been designated 4th Horse Guards. The 4th (Lord Dover's) Troop of Horse Guards was formed in 1686 and disbanded in 1689 upon the deposition of James II. A Dutch troop of horse designated Garde du Corps van Zijne Majesteit (His Majesty's Life Guards) was placed on the English establishment in 1689, ranked as the 4th Troop of Life Guards, and returned to Dutch service in 1699.

On its transfer to the British Establishment, the Scots Troop moved back to London in 1709. The unit still remained distinctively Scottish, but it became a unit reserved for the rich, with even a trooper's appointment costing 100 guineas, and the men being expected to supply their own horses. Nonetheless, the troopers distinguished themselves at the Battle of Dettingen and Battle of Fontenoy, but in 1746, the Horse Guards were reorganized. The Scots Troop, along with the Duke of York's Troop, ceased to exist as a unit, although the continuity of the 4th Troop was later vested in the 2nd Troop of Horse Guards.

== Colonels and former names of the 4th Troop of Horse Guards ==
=== 4th (Lord Dover's) Troop ===
- 1687-1689 Lt-Gen. Henry, Baron Dover —Jermyn's or Lord Dover's Horse Guards

=== Scots Troop (1661-1709) ===
- 1661-1671 Col. James, Earl of Newburgh —Livingston's or Earl of Newburgh's Horse Guards
- 1671-1678 Col. John, Marquess of Atholl —Murray's or Marquess of Atholl's Horse Guards
- 1678-1684 Col. James, Marquess of Montrose —Graham's or Marquess of Montrose's Horse Guards
- 1684-1688 Col. George, Earl of Linlithgow —Livingston's or Earl of Linlithgow's Horse Guards
- 1688-1696 Col. James, Duke of Queensberry —Douglas's or Duke of Queensberry's Horse Guards
- 1696-1703 Maj-Gen. Archibald, Duke of Argyll —Campbell's or Duke of Argyll's Horse Guards
- 1703-1715 F.M. John, Duke of Argyll —Campbell's or Duke of Argyll's Horse Guards

=== 4th Troop (1709-1746) ===
- 1715-1719 Col. John, Earl of Dundonald —Earl of Dundonald's Horse Guards
- 1719-1727 Col. George, Lord Forrester —Baillie's or Lord Forrester's Horse Guards
- 1727-1740 F.M. Richard, Viscount Shannon —Boyle's or Lord Shannon's Horse Guards
- 1740-1743 Brig-Gen. Francis, Earl of Effingham —Howard's or Earl of Effingham's Horse Guards
- 1743-1746 Lt-Gen. John, Earl of Crawford —John Lindsay's or Earl of Crawford's Horse Guards
