= Brigadier (United Kingdom) =

Military rank of the United Kingdom

- Army No. 2 and Royal Marines No. 1B service uniform insignia

- Motor car star plate
- Country: United Kingdom
- Service branch: British Army; Royal Marines
- Abbreviation: Brig
- Rank group: Field officers
- Rank: One-star rank
- NATO rank code: OF-6
- Formation: c. 1685–1688
- Next higher rank: Major general
- Next lower rank: Colonel
- Equivalent ranks: Commodore (RN); Air commodore (RAF)

Brigadier (Brig) is a senior rank in the British Army and the Royal Marines. Brigadier is the superior rank to colonel and subordinate to major-general. It corresponds to the rank of brigadier general in many other nations, although it is not considered to be a general officer rank in the United Kingdom.

The rank has a NATO rank code of OF-6, placing it equivalent to the Royal Navy commodore and the Royal Air Force air commodore ranks and the brigadier general (1-star general) rank of the United States military and numerous other NATO nations.

== Insignia ==
The rank insignia for a brigadier is a Tudor Crown over three "pips" ("Bath" stars).

== Usage ==
Brigadier was originally an appointment conferred on colonels (as commodore was an appointment conferred on naval captains) rather than a substantive rank. However, from 1 November 1947 it became a substantive rank in the British Army. The Royal Marines, however, retained it as an acting rank until 1997, when both commodore and brigadier became substantive ranks.

== Historical rank of brigadier-general ==
Rank insignia (until 1921)

Brigadier-general was formerly a rank or appointment in the British Army and Royal Marines, and briefly in the Royal Air Force. It first appeared in the army in the reign of James II, but did not exist in the Royal Marines until 1913. In the 1740s, the substantive rank of brigadier-general was suppressed, and thereafter brigadier-general was a temporary appointment only, bestowed on a colonel or lieutenant-colonel (or on a colonel commandant in the Royal Marines) for the duration of a specific command (similar to a commodore).

The appointment was abolished in both the Army and the Marines in 1921, being replaced in the Army by the appointments of colonel-commandant (which already existed as a rank in the Marines) and colonel on the staff. These appointments, although reflecting its modern role in the British Army as a senior colonel rather than a junior general, were not well received and were both replaced with brigadier in both the Army and the Marines (although not replacing the substantive rank of colonel commandant in the latter) in 1928. From the formation of the Royal Air Force on 1 April 1918 until 31 July 1919, it used the appointment of brigadier-general. This was superseded by the rank of air commodore on the following day.

The rank insignia for appointment of the brigadier-general was a crossed sword and baton. The rank insignia for colonel-commandant and colonel on the staff was that later adopted for brigadiers.

Brigadier is the highest field officer rank (hence the absence of the word "general"), whereas brigadier-general was the lowest general officer "rank". However, the two ranks are considered equal.

== Junior officer rank ==
Historically, brigadier and sub-brigadier were the junior officer ranks in the Troops of Horse Guards. This corresponded to French practice, where a brigadier was the cavalry equivalent of a corporal. To reflect the status of the Horse Guards as Household Troops, brigadiers ranked with lieutenants and sub-brigadiers with cornets in other cavalry regiments. When the Horse Guards were disbanded in 1788, the brigadiers and sub-brigadiers of the 1st and 2nd Troops became lieutenants and cornets in the 1st and 2nd Regiments of Life Guards, respectively.

Brigadier remains the lowest officer rank in the Royal Company of Archers, the King's Bodyguard for Scotland. There are twelve brigadiers on the establishment, ranking after ensigns.

== See also ==
- British and U.S. military ranks compared
- British Army other ranks rank insignia
- British Army officer rank insignia
