= Horse Grenadier Guards =

British Army cavalry troops

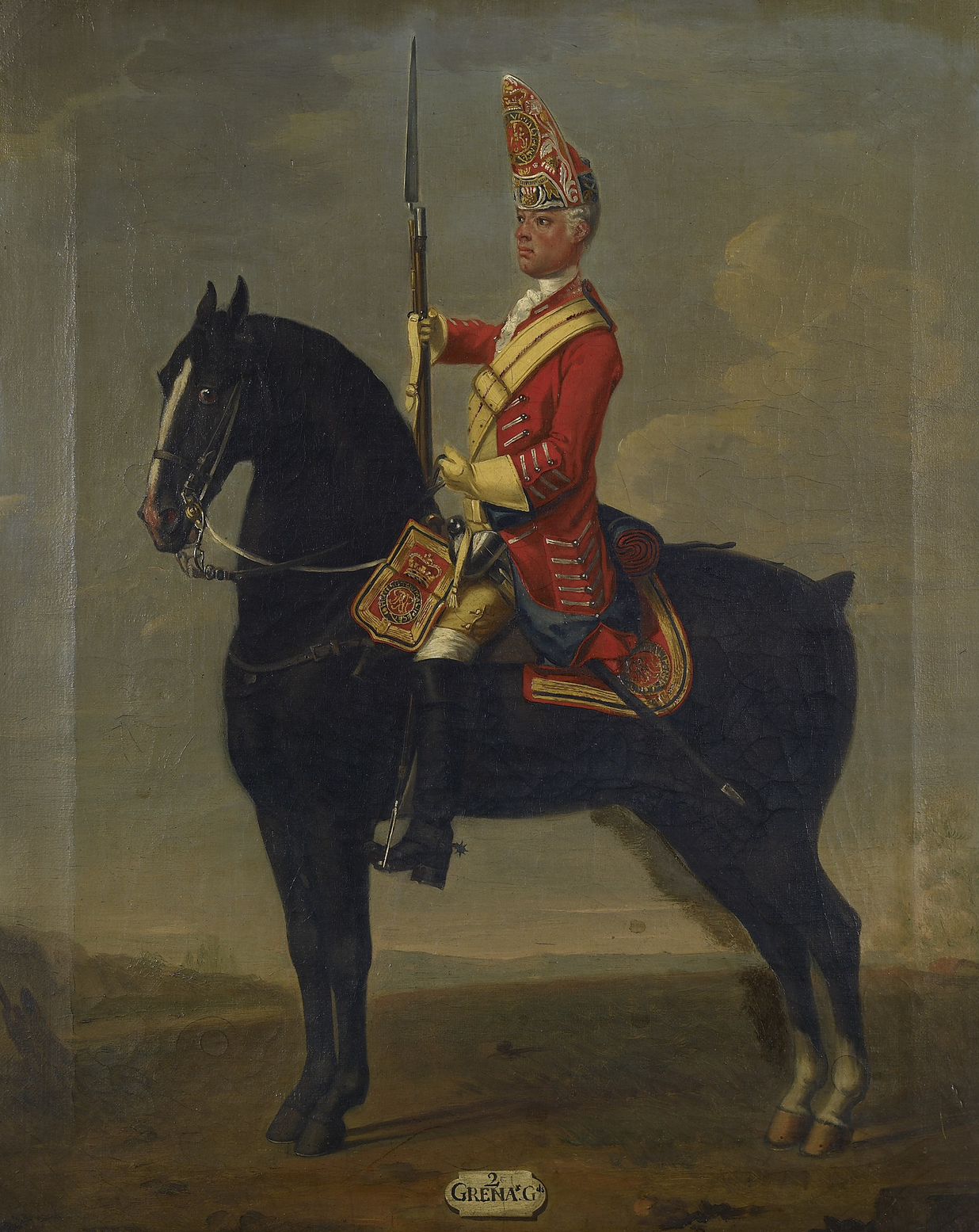
c. 1751 painting of a 2nd Troop of Horse Grenadier Guards private

The Horse Grenadier Guards, usually referred to as Horse Grenadiers, were a group of cavalry troops of the English Army and British Army which existed between 1687 and 1788. Originally attached to the troops of Horse Guards, they became independent for a century before being disbanded. The Horse Grenadier Guards formed the basis of the new troops of Life Guards following their disbandment.

== History ==
=== Origins ===
The origins of the Horse Grenadiers lie in the grenadiers a cheval of the French army. Louis XIV added a troop of 154 to the Maison Militaire du Roi in December 1676, making it perhaps the most impressive regiment in Europe. Charles II was eager to copy the exciting new innovation of grenade technology. Grenadiers, soldiers specially trained to carry and use hand grenades, first appeared in the English Army in 1677. Particularly tall and strong soldiers were usually picked to become grenadiers, because of the weight of extra equipment that they carried. Their use became general in the English Army in 1678, when a company from each infantry regiment was picked and trained as grenadiers. It was at this time that the horse grenadiers were first raised.

=== Purposes ===
Their intended role was to reinforce the Horse Guards, a unit made up of gentlemen volunteers. In contrast, the horse grenadiers were recruited from the regular rest army.John Evelyn described their appearances in his Diary entry for 5 December 1683.

The King had now augmented his guards with a new sort of dragoons, who carried also granados, and were habited after the Polish manner, with long picked caps, very fierce and fantastical.

In 1680 the Horse Grenadiers were briefly disbanded due to protest from anti-militarists in the backlash to the Popish Plot, but the King was insistent that they provided much-needed protection, and they were promptly reinstated in 1683. The Exclusion Bill Parliament attempted to dismiss the standing army and separate the militia from the King's command. In May 1679 they passed another Disbanding Act, calling for disbanding of all troops and the prohibition of domestic quarter billeting without householder consent. The controversy caused the downfall of Tory minister Thomas Osborne, 1st Earl of Danby. From August the Horse Grenadiers were all quartered at the Royal Mews, Charing Cross, stabling for 222 horses.

These grenadiers functioned as mounted infantry, riding with the Horse Guards but fighting with grenades and muskets on foot. (Contemporary dragoons fought in a similar manner, but without grenades.) To The King's Troop of Horse Guards were attached 80 privates, officered by one captain, two lieutenants, three sergeants, and three corporals, and accompanied by two drummers and two hautboys. The grenadiers attached to The Queen's Troop of Horse Guards and The Duke of York's Troop of Horse Guards had no drummers, two sergeants and two corporals, and only sixty privates per troop. Apparently no grenadiers were raised for the 4th Troop then extant. However, The Earl of Dover's Troop of Horse Guards, raised in May 1686, did receive a grenadier contingent.

In November 1687, the horse grenadiers were separated from the Horse Guards as the 1st, 2nd, 3rd, and 4th Troop of Grenadiers, one for each of the four existing troops of Horse Guards. As with the Horse Guards, the captains commanding the troops were ranked as Captain & Colonel. The 4th Troop was disbanded in 1689, together with the Horse Guards troop it accompanied, after the abdication of James II.

=== Revolutionary 'common men' ===
The Horse Grenadier Guards fought at the Battle of the Boyne, under the command of George Cholmondeley, then a lieutenant-colonel in the 1st Horse Guards. One of the Horse Grenadiers was reportedly the first casualty of the battle. They then saw foreign service during the Nine Years' War, fighting dismounted at the Battle of Steenkerque. In 1693, the three troops were amalgamated into one troop, known as the Horse Grenadier Guards, and Cholmondeley was made Captain and Colonel. Another troop, the Scots Troop of Grenadiers, was raised in 1702 as part of the Scots Army, it was associated with the 4th or Scots Troop of Horse Guards. These became part of the British Army in 1707, and the Scots grenadiers became the 2nd Troop of the Horse Grenadier Guards, while the English troop was 1st Troop.

From the June 1691 Battle of Leuze, to the Peace of Ryswick, the Horse Guards and Horse Grenadiers had been exclusively in Britain and saw little action. Most of the Life Guards were deployed as King William III's bodyguard, but others were as troops of Horse Grenadiers as a regiment of horse. During the reigns of Queen Anne and George I they were deployed to keep the peace. The rivalry between the two regiments was intense. While Life Guards escorted General Frederick Schomberg, 1st Duke of Schomberg to a royal reception, the Horse Grenadiers were relegated to the baggage train. They considered they were being treated as if second rate. But thanks to the Life Guards class as private gentlemen, an insult to Willem van Keppel, 2nd Earl of Albemarle in 1719 only required an apology; the matter never reached court. 'Private gentlemen of the right quality' were expected to join a Household regiment as they were expected to carry out public duties. By contrast Robert Walpole's policy of isolationism from continental wars frustrated the Blues and Royals, who were used to police riots and on anti-smuggling patrols.

=== Battle troop commanders ===
c. 1751 painting of a 1st Troop of Horse Grenadier Guards private

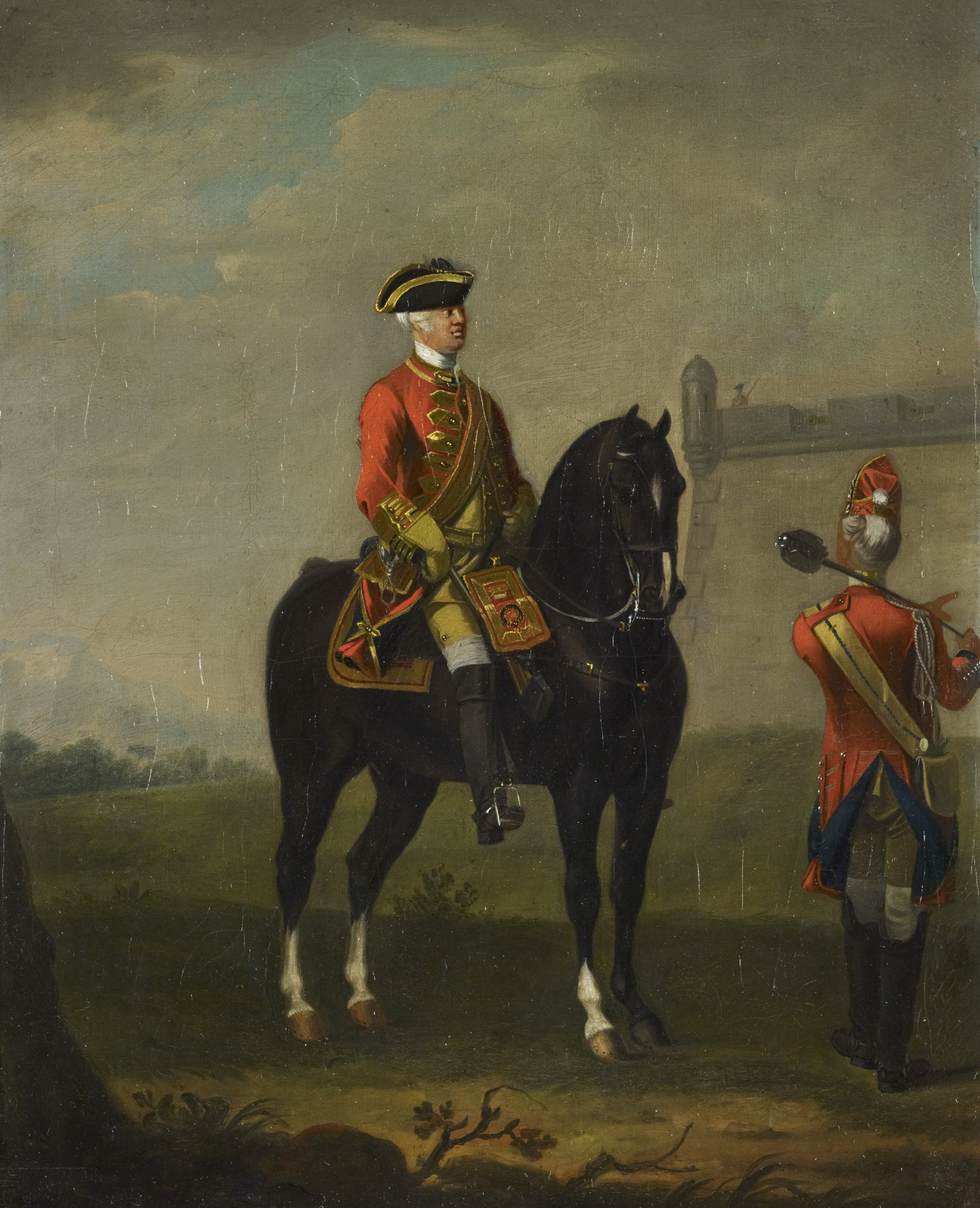
c. 1750 painting of a 2nd Troop of Horse Grenadier Guards private (right)

In the person of Earl of Cholmondeley the Horse Grenadiers had a successful commander of 1st Troop until 1733. Less competent were the Earl of Dundonald and Lord Forester both of 4th Troop. One of the problems was the standardization of pay; a technique known as "Off-reckonings" varied enormously between regiments. Lord Shannon did a better job 1735–40. However, in 1742, the 3rd and 4th (Scots) Troops of Horse Guards were sent abroad for service in the War of the Austrian Succession, and the 2nd Troop of Horse Grenadier Guards went with them. The brigade was engaged at the Battle of Dettingen, where it guarded George II on the field. It sustained less than twenty casualties, out of an allied total of 2,000 due to improved breastplate armour. When on 25 March 1745, Prince William, Duke of Cumberland was appointed Commander-in-chief and arrived in Flanders, the Horse Grenadiers were put into a brigade with Life Guards, and Blues, under Lord Craufurd. Two troops of Horse Grenadiers and Two from Life Guards constituted the Household Cavalry. This arrangement was abolished by royal decree on 18 June 1788, to be replaced by two regiments of Life Guards.

One distinguished Horse Grenadier was General Onslow, Colonel of 1st Troop, who was a divisional commander in Flanders under Cumberland. The regiment took part in all royal escorts providing the van and rearguards; with Life Guards around the King's body in the centre. The brigade also fought at the Battle of Fontenoy and helped to cover the Allied retreat from the field. With the outbreak of the Jacobite rising of 1745, the Household Cavalry was recalled from Europe.

The losses of 1756–7 prompted one Horse Grenadier officer, George Elliot, to re-evaluate the reasons for their defeat. He tackled questions such as the purchasing of commissions, dragoon tactics, care and size of horses, and the quality of leadership and discipline. On 20 October 1760, at his last public engagement, George II reviewed the Horse Grenadiers with Life Guards in Hyde Park. Two of the regiment would ride escort in the King's funeral cortège on 13 November as it trundled into Westminster Abbey. The King went out on a high note after the army's notable victories in 1759 and 1760 gave him real hope.

Thereafter, the military service of the Horse Grenadier Guards was only employment in occasional actions against rioters. They took part in the Massacre of St George's Fields in 1768 and the Spitalfield Riots in 1769. A party of Horse Grenadier Guards had to be called out to protect Sir George Savile's house in 1780 during the Gordon Riots, their last significant action. By 1775, the drummers and hautboys were replaced by four trumpeters.

=== Royal service and Empire ===
During George III's intensely political reign, the Household cavalry were called upon to intervene in elections in the name of the King. In 1784, they were required to support Sir Cecil Wray against Charles James Fox at the Westminster hustings. A total of 280 troopers were ordered to vote Tory.

"All Horse Guards, Grenadier Guards, Foot Guards and Blackguards, that have not polled for the destruction of Chelsea Hospital... are desired to meet at the Gutter Hole opposite the Horse Guards, where they will have a full bumper of knock-me down and plenty of soapsuds before they go in to poll for Sir C Wray." read a Fox party poster.

In 1788, army reforms broke up the "gentlemen's club" of the Horse Guards, and a decisive mood prevailed in parliament for Pitt to act. The two extant troops of Horse Guards became the Life Guards, and the private gentlemen who had heretofore made up the ranks of the regiment were largely pensioned off. The Horse Grenadier Guards were disbanded at the same time, and many of the men transferred to the Life Guards, making up the bulk of the new regiment. The wholesale replacement of aristocrats by common troopers gave the Life Guards the derisory nickname of "Cheeses" or "Cheesemongers". Prince Frederick, Duke of York and Albany, Commander-in-Chief wrote to Lord Cornwallis:

"I have no doubt that Your Lordship will not regret the reduction of the Troops of Horse Guards and Horse Grenadiers as they were the most useless & the most unmilitary Troopes that ever were seen. I confess that I was a little sorry for the Horse Grenadiers because they were to a degree Soldiers, but the Horse Guards were nothing but a collection of London Tradespeople."

One reason for the symptom of declining reputation was poor pay. But after the reforms regimental prestige rose as officers wanted to purchase a commission just for the honour of serving. Generous retirement annuities were negotiated by Colonel of Horse Grenadiers, Hugh Percy, 2nd Duke of Northumberland and his deputy, John Griffin, 4th Baron Howard de Walden. Their regiment became a 'feeder' to 1st and 2nd Life Guards. Traditionally chosen for their size and strength, the Horse Grenadiers' more professional complexion changed the character of the 'gentlemanly' Life Guards. In 1806 Northumberland took over as Colonel of The Blues. The Duke was a popular figure who reduced rents through a period of failed harvests, and an effective colonel. He had served with the Horse Grenadiers in the Seven Years' War. The Horse Grenadiers disappeared after 1788 as the amalgamated part of the Life Guards two regiments. Devonshire's long black jackboots, and the flash cord of the grenades from the Horse Grenadiers were used in the design of the modern ceremonial cartouche of the 1850s.

== Captains & Colonels, 1st Troop, Horse Grenadier Guards ==
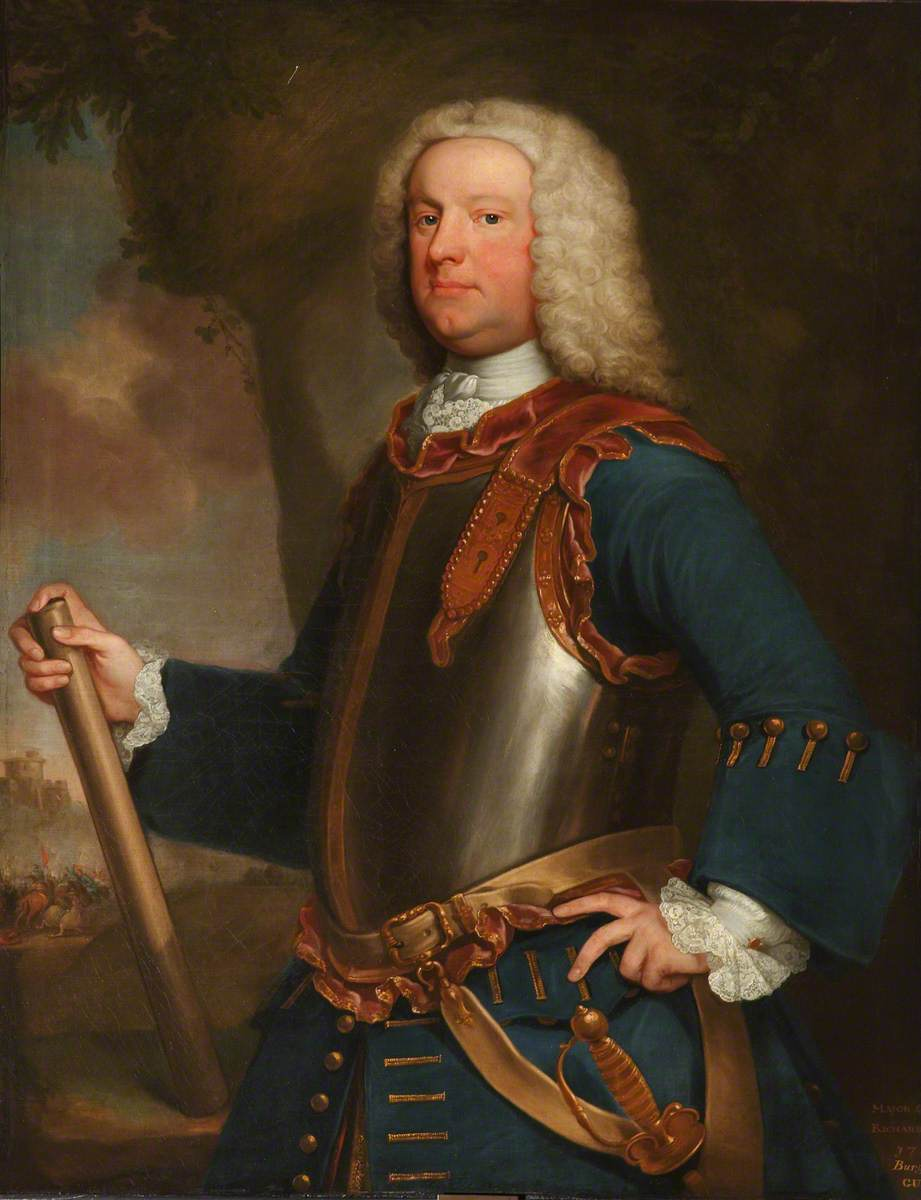
Richard Onslow, the captain and colonel of the 1st Troop from 1745 to 1763

- 1693 George Cholmondeley (4 October 1693 –2 February 1715)
- 1715 Richard, Lord Lumley (2 February 1715 –11 December 1717)
- 1717 John Fane (11 December 1717 –7 August 1733)
- 1733 Sir Robert Rich, 4th Baronet (7 August 1733 –13 May 1735)
- 1735 Sir Charles Hotham, 5th Baronet (13 May 1735 –10 February 1738)
- 1742 Richard Temple, 1st Viscount Cobham (25 December 1742 – 25 April 1745)
- 1745 Richard Onslow (25 April 1745 –16 March 1760)
- 1760 Thomas Howard, 2nd Earl of Effingham (30 October 1760 –19 November 1763)
- 1763 John West, Viscount Cantelupe (21 November 1763 –21 March 1766)
- 1766 John Griffin, 4th Baron Howard de Walden (21 March 1766 –8 June 1788)

On 8 June 1788 1st Troop was absorbed by 1st Troop Horse Guards

== Captains & Colonels, 2nd Troop (Scots), Horse Grenadier Guards ==
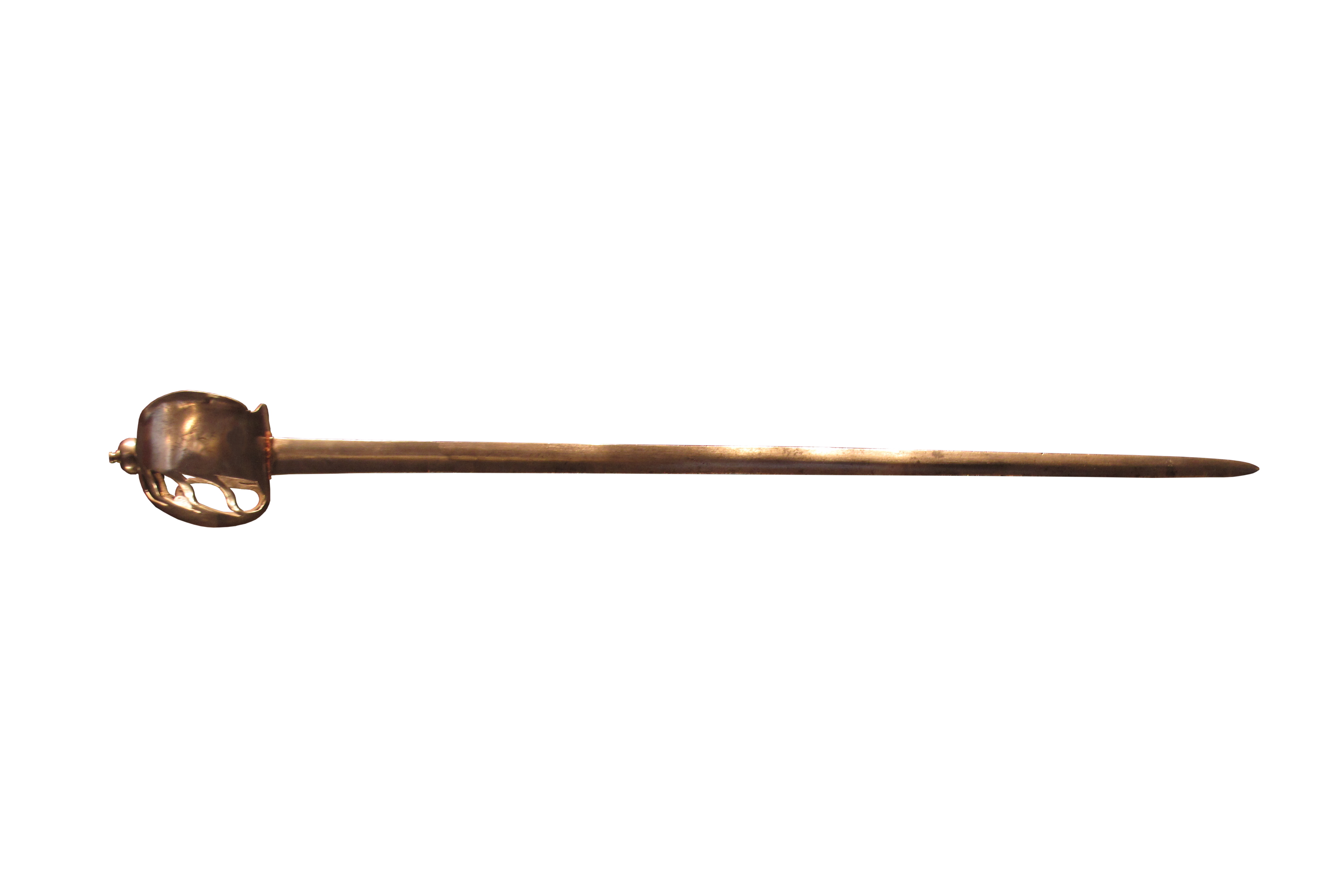
Broadsword of the 2nd Troop made c. 1750

- 1702 William Forbes, 13th Lord Forbes (12 May 1702 –4 May 1704)
- 1704 John Lindsay, 19th Earl of Crawford (4 May 1704 –December 1713)
- 1714 George Keith, 10th Earl Marischal (5 January 1714 –1 June 1715)
- 1715 Henry Scott, 1st Earl of Deloraine (1 June 1715 –17 July 1717)
- 1717 George Forrester, 5th Lord Forrester (17 July 1717 –21 April 1719)
- 1719 Henry Berkeley (21 April 1719 –May 1736)
- 1737 Francis Howard, 1st Earl of Effingham (21 June 1737 –25 December 1740)
- 1740 John Lindsay, 20th Earl of Crawford (25 December 1740 –1 April 1743)
- 1743 James O'Hara, 2nd Baron Tyrawley (1 April 1743 –25 April 1745)
- 1745 John Leslie, 10th Earl of Rothes (25 April 1745 –5 June 1745)
- 1745 William Stanhope, 2nd Earl of Harrington (5 June 1745 –1 April 1779)
- 1779 Jeffery Amherst, 1st Baron Amherst (21 April 1779 –23 March 1782)
- 1782 Prince Frederick, Duke of York and Albany (23 March 1782 –1 November 1784)
- 1784 Hugh Percy, 2nd Duke of Northumberland (1 November 1784 –8 June 1788)

On 8 June 1788 2nd Troop were absorbed by 2nd Troop Horse Guards
