= John Lindsay, 19th Earl of Crawford =

Scottish peer and politician

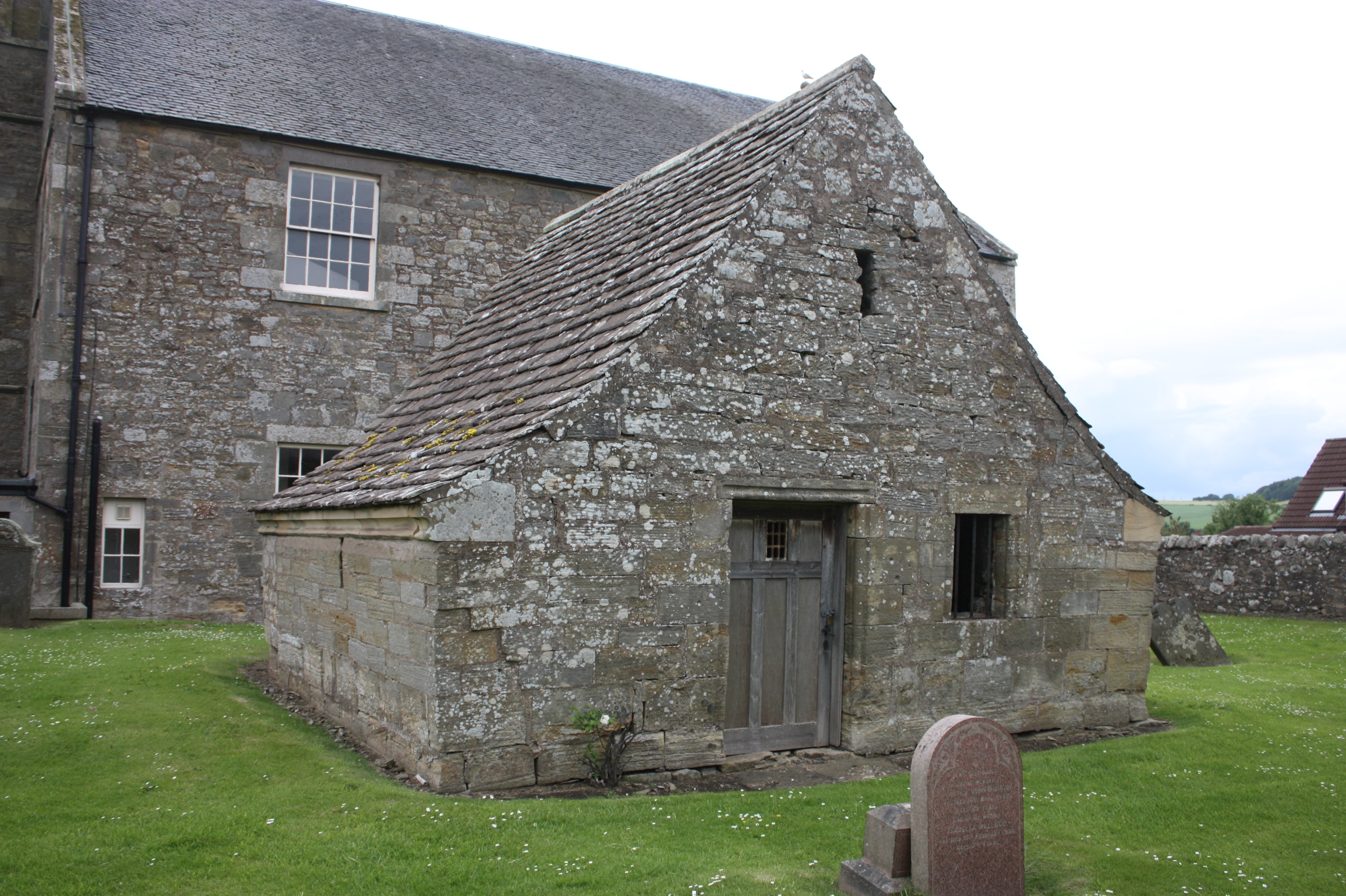
The vault of John Lindsay (often called Lady Boyd's House) Ceres Churchyard

John Lindsay, 19th Earl of Crawford and 3rd Earl of Lindsay (born before 1672; died December 1713) was a Scottish peer and politician.

== Life ==
He was born before 1672, the eldest son of William Lindsay, 18th Earl of Crawford, and Lady Mary Johnstone. He succeeded to the earldoms in 1698 on the death of his father.

On 6 March 1698, he succeeded to the title of 12th Lord Lindsay of Byres. He married Amelia Fraser, widow of Alexander Fraser, around 1700. He had four children: John (who succeeded as 20th Earl), William, Catherine, and Mary.

Trained as a lawyer, in 1708 he was appointed to the Privy Counsellor position for Scotland. He was Colonel of the 2nd Troop of Horse Grenadier Guards from 1704 to 1713.

Following the Treaty of Union in May 1707, he was elected as one of the first Scottish representative peers, serving from 13 February 1707 until September 1710.

He died in London in December 1713. He is buried in the family vault of Ceres, Fife churchyard in central Fife.

Military offices
Preceded by The Lord Forbes	Captain and Colonel of the 2nd Troop Horse Grenadier Guards; 1704–1713	Succeeded by The Earl Marischal
Peerage of Scotland
Preceded by William Lindsay	Earl of Crawford; Earl of Lindsay; 1698–1713	Succeeded by John Lindsay
Political offices
Preceded by None	Scottish representative peer 1707–1710	Succeeded by The Duke of Atholl
