= George FitzRoy, Duke of Northumberland =

British Army general

Lieutenant-General His Grace The Duke of Northumberland KG PC
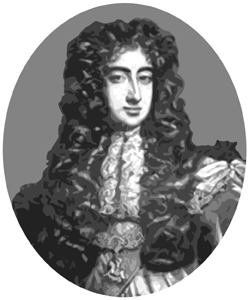

Duke of Northumberland
- Born: 28 December 1665
- Died: 28 June 1716 (aged 50)
- Spouses: Catherine Wheatley (1686-1714); Mary Dutton (1714-1716)
- Father: Charles II of England
- Mother: Barbara Palmer, 1st Duchess of Cleveland

Lieutenant-General George FitzRoy, Duke of Northumberland, KG, PC (28 December 1665 – 28 June 1716) was the third and youngest illegitimate son of King Charles II of England ('Charles the Black') by Barbara Villiers, Countess of Castlemaine (also known as Barbara Villiers, Duchess of Cleveland); he was the fifth of Charles's eight illegitimate sons. On 1 October 1674, he was created Earl of Northumberland, Baron of Pontefract (Yorkshire) and Viscount Falmouth (Cornwall). On 6 April 1683, he was created Duke of Northumberland. He was described as "a most worthy man", and as "...a tall, Black-Man, like his father, the King." The same John Macky files described his half-sibling, Charles Lennox, Duke of Richmond as Black complexion, also like his father, King Charles II.

The first Duke of Northumberland was born at Merton College, Oxford. In 1682, he was employed on secret service in Venice. Upon his return to England in 1684, he was elected (10 January) and installed (8 April) Knight of the Garter. That summer, he served as a volunteer on the side of the French at the Siege of Luxembourg. In 1687, Northumberland commanded the 2nd Troop of Horse Guards. A year later, he was appointed a lord of His Majesty's bedchamber. In 1701, he was appointed Constable of Windsor Castle, in 1710 Lord Lieutenant of Surrey, and in 1712, he became Lord Lieutenant of Berkshire as well. In 1703, he succeeded the Earl of Oxford as Colonel of the Royal Regiment of Horse. Seven years later, on 10 January 1710, he became Lieutenant-General. On 7 April 1713, he was sworn into the Privy Council and as Chief Butler of England.

In March 1686, Northumberland married Catherine Wheatley, the daughter of a poulterer, Robert Wheatley of Bracknell in Berkshire. Catherine was the widow of Thomas Lucy of Charlecote Park, a captain in the Royal Horse Guards. Her sister married the Earl of Dumbarton. Soon after the marriage, Northumberland and his brother, Henry FitzRoy, 1st Duke of Grafton, allegedly attempted to privately convey her abroad to an English convent in Ghent, Belgium. After Catherine's death in 1714, Northumberland married Mary Dutton, the sister of Cpt. Mark Dutton.

The Duke lived at Frogmore House at Windsor in Berkshire, but died suddenly aged 50 at Epsom on 28 June 1716. He had no legitimate offspring. His wife Mary FitzRoy, Duchess of Northumberland died at Frogmore House in 1738.

== Arms ==
Coat of arms of George FitzRoy, Duke of Northumberland
Coronet A Coronet of a Duke Crest On a Chapeau Gules turned up Ermine a Lion statant guardant Or ducally crowned Azure and gorged with a Collar compony counter-compony ermine and Azure. Escutcheon The Royal Arms of King Charles II of England (viz. quarterly: 1st and 4th, France and England quarterly; 2nd, Scotland; 3rd, Ireland); the whole debruised by a Baton sinister compony ermine and Azure. Supporters Dexter: a Lion guardant Or ducally crowned Azure, gorged with a Collar compony counter-compony ermine and Azure. Sinister: A greyhound Argent, with a Collar compony counter-compony ermine and Azure. Motto None listed

Military offices
Preceded by Sir Philip Howard	Captain and Colonel of The Queen's Troop of Horse Guards; 1685–1689	Succeeded by The Earl of Ossory
Preceded by The Earl of Oxford	Colonel of the Royal Horse Guards; 1703–1712	Succeeded by Viscount Colchester
Preceded by The Duke of Ormonde	Captain and Colonel of The Queen's Troop of Horse Guards; 1712–1715	Succeeded by Earl of Hertford
Honorary titles
Preceded by The Duke of Norfolk	Constable of Windsor Castle; 1702–1716	Succeeded by The Lord Cobham
Preceded by The Earl of Berkeley	Lord Lieutenant of Surrey; 1710–1714	Succeeded by The Earl of Halifax
Preceded by The Lord Craven	Lord Lieutenant of Berkshire; 1712–1714	Succeeded by The Duke of St Albans
