= Henry Berkeley (British Army officer) =

British Army officer and politician

Brigadier-General Henry Berkeley (after 1682 – 23 May 1736) was a British Army officer and politician who sat in the House of Commons from 1720 to 1734.

Berkeley was the third son of Charles Berkeley, 2nd Earl of Berkeley and his wife Elizabeth Noel, daughter of Baptist Noel, 3rd Viscount Campden. He served as a page of honour to the Duke of Gloucester, and afterwards to Queen Anne. He obtained a commission in the Army in December 1709, rising to be a Brigadier-General in the Horse Grenadier Guards in 1735. He married, in 1712, Mary Cornewall, daughter of Col. Henry Cornewall, MP of Moccas, Herefordshire'

In June 1717 Berkeley was appointed first commissioner for executing the office of Master of the Horse to King George I, and on 25 December following he was appointed to the colonelcy of the King's Own Regiment of Foot, from which he was removed in 1719 to the Scots Troop of Horse Grenadier Guards, a position he held until his death. He was also one of the King's equerries.

Berkeley was returned unopposed as a Whig Member of Parliament for Gloucestershire at a by-election on 30 March 1720. He was re-elected in a contest at the 1722 general election and returned unopposed at the 1727 general election. All his recorded votes were for the Government. He did not stand in the 1734 general election.

Berkeley died at Bath on 23 May 1736. He and his wife had three sons and five daughters.

Parliament of Great Britain
Preceded by Thomas Stephens; Matthew Moreton	Member of Parliament for Gloucestershire; 1720–1734; With: Matthew Moreton 1720; Edmund Bray 1720–1722; Kinard de la Bere 1722–1727; Sir John Dutton 1727–1736	Succeeded by Thomas Chester; Benjamin Bathurst
Military offices
Preceded by William Seymour	Colonel of the King's Own Regiment of Foot; 1717–1719	Succeeded by Charles Cadogan
Preceded by The Lord Forrester	Captain and Colonel of the 2nd Troop Horse Grenadier Guards; 1719–1736	Succeeded by The Earl of Effingham
Court offices
Preceded by Conyers Darcy	Gentleman of the Horse; 1717–1736	Succeeded by James Brudenell
