= Thomas Edwards-Freeman (younger) =

Thomas Edwards-Freeman (1754–1788) was a British politician who sat in the House of Commons from 1785 to 1788.

Edwards Freeman was the only son of Thomas Edwards-Freeman of Batsford, Gloucestershire and his wife Elizabeth Reveley, daughter of Henry Reveley of Newby Wisk, Yorkshire. He matriculated at Queen's College, Oxford on 31 December 1772, aged 18. He married Mary Curtis daughter of John Curtis of Butcombe, Somerset. She died in 1781.

On 9 August 1785 Edwards Freeman was returned at a by-election as Member of Parliament for Steyning on the Honywood interest. There is no record of his having spoken in the House. He died on 23 March 1788.

Parliament of Great Britain
Preceded by Sir John Honywood; Hon. Richard Howard	Member of Parliament for Steyning; 1785–1788; With: Hon. Richard Howard	Succeeded by Sir John Honywood; Hon. Richard Howard
