= Timothy Earl =

Colonel Timothy James Earl, OBE was Private Secretary to the Princess Royal between 1999 and 2002. He was educated at Brentwood School and the Royal Military Academy, Sandhurst.

Commissioned into The Life Guards in 1964, he was promoted major in 1976, and was later Commanding Officer of The Life Guards. He was promoted to colonel in 1988 and attended the Royal College of Defence Studies in 1989.

He retired from the British Army in 1993 and became Secretary of the Government Hospitality Fund.

In 1999 he joined the Office of the Princess Royal.

The Household of The Princess Royal provides the administrative support to The Princess Royal, daughter of Queen Elizabeth II. It is based at Buckingham Palace, and is headed by the Private Secretary.

The Household is separate from the Royal Household and is funded from the Civil List annuity paid to The Princess Royal for her public duties - which is however reimbursed to HM Treasury by The King.

Colonel Earl was made an OBE in 2000.
