= John Lindsay, 20th Earl of Crawford =

British army officer (1702–1749)

Lieutenant-General The Right Honourable The Earl of Crawford FRS
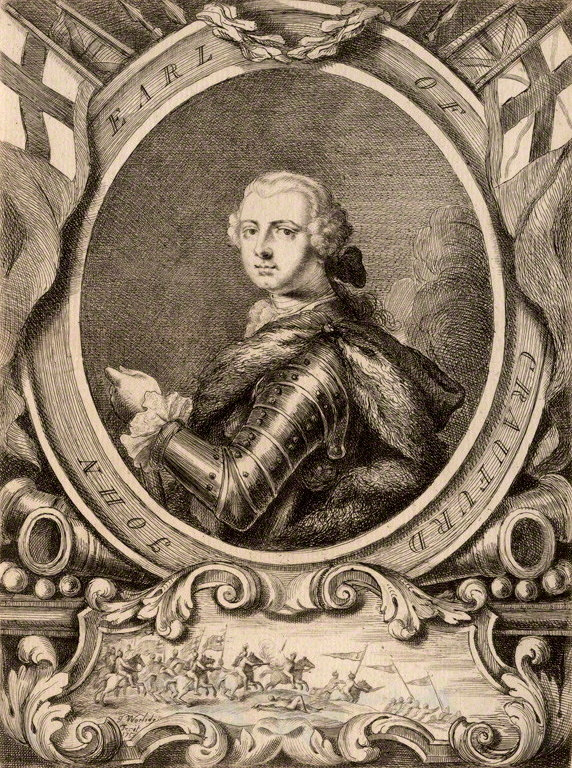
- Born: John Lindsay, Lord Balniel; 4 October 1702
- Died: 25 December 1749 (aged 47)

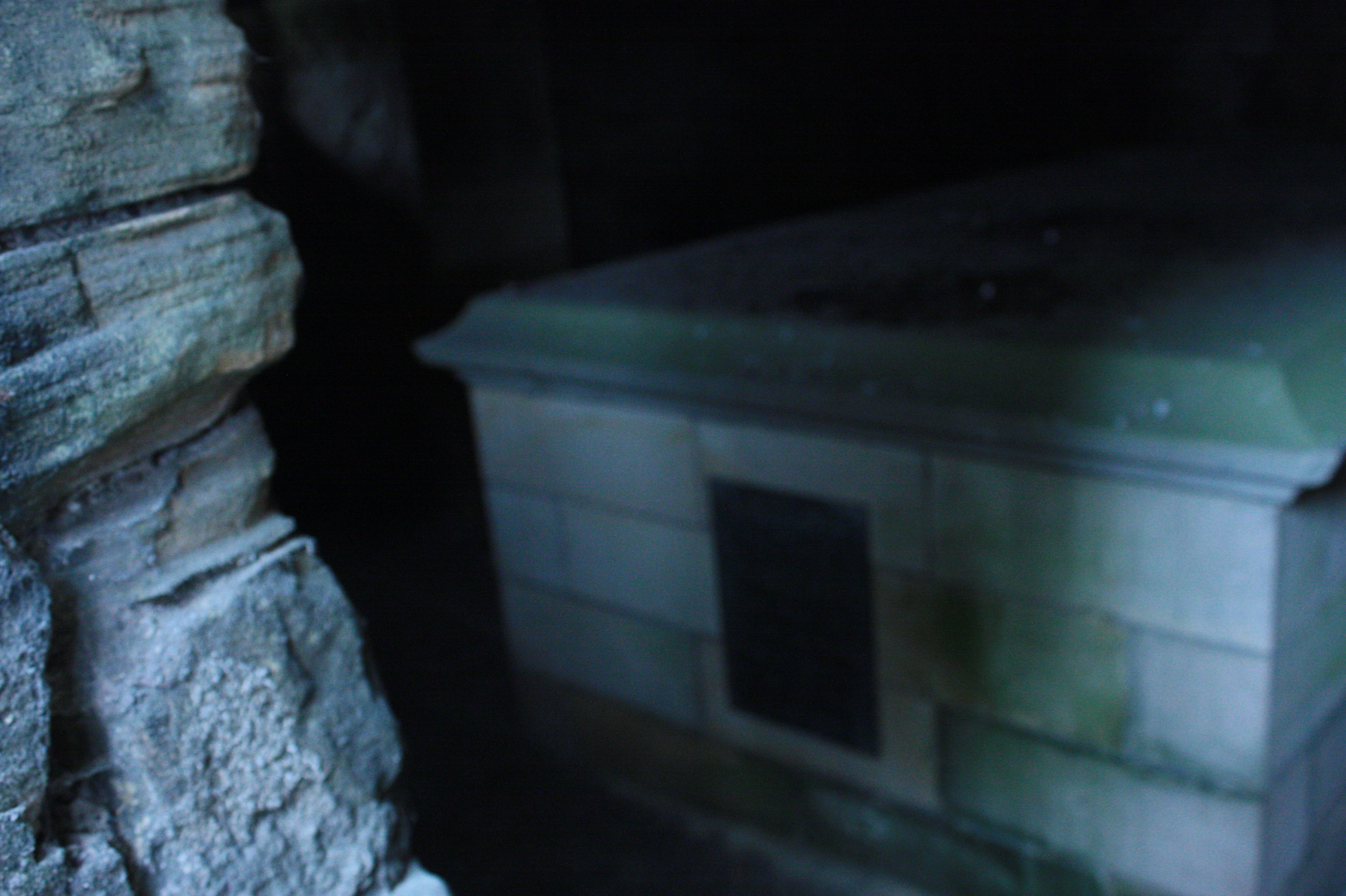
The grave of John Lindsay, Earl of Crawford, Ceres, Fife

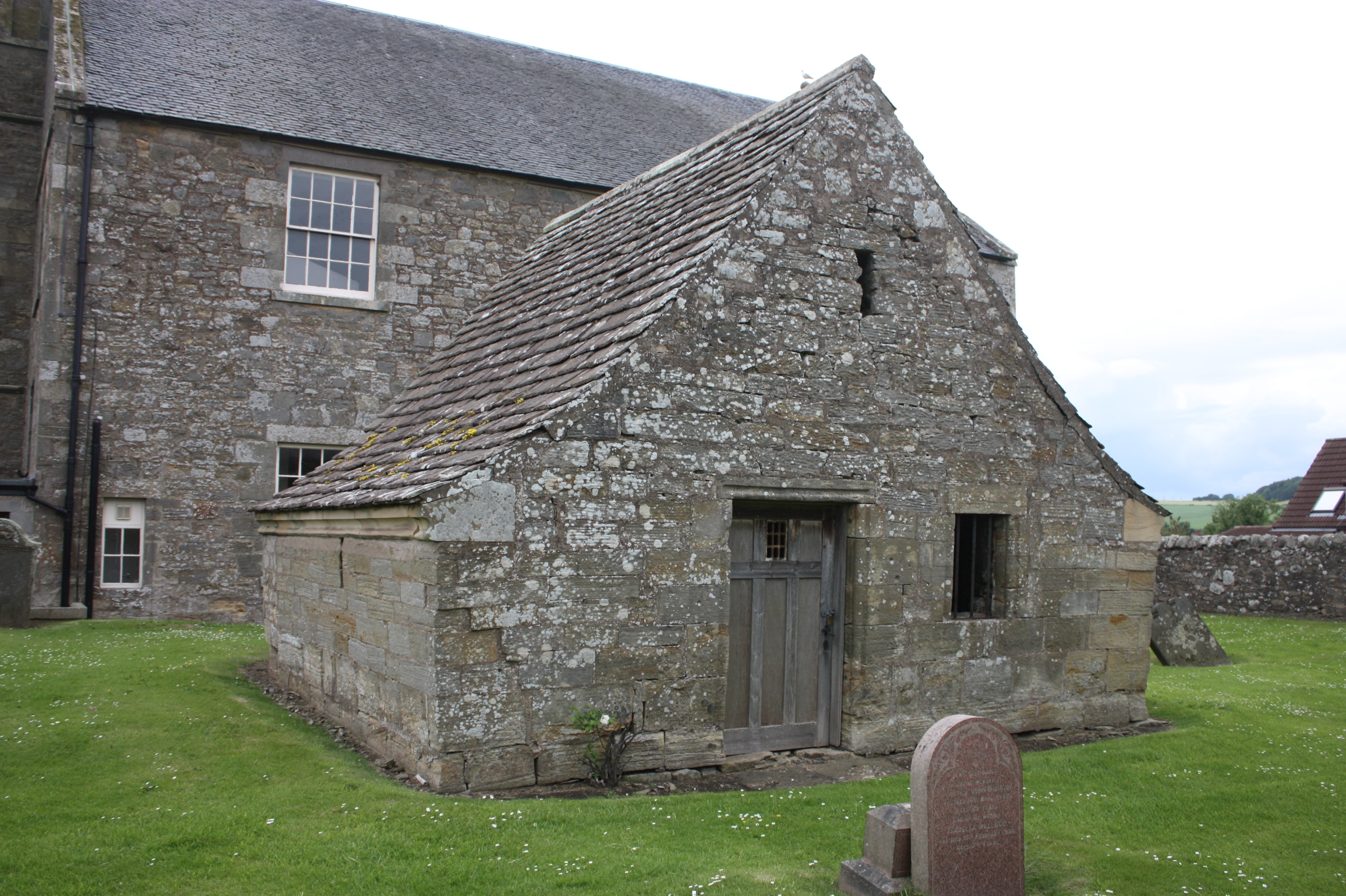
The vault of John Lindsay (often called Lady Boyd's House) Ceres Churchyard

Lieutenant-General John Lindsay, 20th Earl of Crawford (4 October 1702 – 25 December 1749) was a British army officer and the first colonel of the Black Watch on its formation in 1739.

== Biography ==
Lindsay was the son of Lieutenant-General John Lindsay, 19th Earl of Crawford and Emilia Stuart and inherited his titles on the death of his father in 1714. He was educated at University of Glasgow and the Vaudeuil Military Academy, Paris.

The Earl of Crawford was commissioned into the 3rd Regiment of Foot Guards in 1726, but later served in the Austrian and Russian armies. In the summer of 1739, during the Battle of Grocka (part of Siege of Belgrade), he was badly wounded by a bullet to his thigh and was almost abandoned for dead on the battlefield. However, after partial recovery and against advice, he travelled back to Vienna, and onward to Britain, where he took command of the Black Watch (1739–1740).

He was then Colonel of the 2nd Troop of Horse Grenadier Guards (1740–1743) and Colonel of the 4th Troop of Horse Guards ('Scottish Horse Guards') (1743–1746), fighting at the Battle of Dettingen on 16 June 1743. He gained the rank of Brigadier-General in 1744 and Major-General in 1745. He fought in the Jacobite rising of 1745 and the Battle of Fontenoy on 30 April 1745.

Crawford was Colonel of the 25th Foot (1746–1747). He fought in the Battle of Rocoux on 11 October 1746 and gained the rank of Lieutenant-General in 1747. He was Colonel of the 2nd Dragoons ('Scots Greys') (1747–1749)

In 1732 Crawford was elected a Fellow of the Royal Society. In 1734 he was Grand Master of the Premier Grand Lodge of England.

== Family ==
Crawford married Lady Jean Murray, daughter of James Murray, 2nd Duke of Atholl, in 1747, but she died only nine months after their marriage. The widowed Crawford shared his London home, 35 Upper Brook Street, with his mother-in-law, the Duchess of Atholl.

He died on 26 December 1749, from a leg wound received at the Battle of Krotzka in 1739. He was the last member of the Lindsay family to be buried in the mausoleum in the cemetery at Ceres, Fife, Scotland.

== Bibliography ==
- Leigh Rayment's Peerage Pages

Military offices
New regiment	Colonel of the 42nd Highland Regiment of Foot "Black Watch"; 1739–1741	Succeeded by The Lord Sempill
Preceded by The Earl of Effingham	Captain and Colonel of the 2nd Troop Horse Grenadier Guards; 1740–1743	Succeeded by The Lord Tyrawley
Preceded by The Earl of Effingham	Captain and Colonel of the 4th (Scots) Troop Horse Guards; 1743–1746	Troop disbanded
Preceded by The Lord Sempill	Colonel of The Earl of Leven's, or Edinburgh, Regiment of Foot; 1746–1747	Succeeded by The Earl of Panmure
Preceded by The Earl of Stair	Colonel of the Royal Regiment of North British Dragoons; 1747–1749	Succeeded by The Earl of Rothes
Peerage of Scotland
Preceded by John Lindsay	Earl of Crawford; Earl of Lindsay; 1713–1749	Succeeded by George Lindsay-Crawford
Masonic offices
Preceded by The Earl of Strathmore and Kinghorne	Grand Master of the Premier; Grand Lodge of England; 1734	Succeeded by The Viscount Weymouth
