= USS Effingham (1777) =

History

United States
- Name: USS Effingham
- Namesake: Earl of Effingham
- Laid down: 1776
- Fate: Scuttled, 2 November 1777

General characteristics
- Type: Frigate
- Armament: 26 × 12-pounder guns 2 × 6-pounder guns

USS Effingham was a 32-gun frigate of the Continental Navy named after Thomas Howard, 3rd Earl of Effingham. She was built at Philadelphia in 1776 and 1777, and Captain John Barry was ordered to command her. When the British took possession of Philadelphia in September 1777, Barry was ordered to take the uncompleted ship up the Delaware River to a place of safety.

On 25 October general George Washington asked for the crew of Effingham for use in the fleet, and two days later the ship was ordered sunk or burned. Effingham was sunk on 2 November just below Bordentown, New Jersey, to deny her use to the British. She was burned to the water's edge by a British raiding party on their way north from Philadelphia on 8 May 1778.

There was also an earlier galley named Effingham built in 1775 by the Pennsylvania Navy.
