= Richard Howard, 4th Earl of Effingham =

British peer (1748–1816)

Richard Howard, 4th Earl of Effingham (21 February 1748 – 11 December 1816) was a British peer and a member of the House of Lords, styled Hon. Richard Howard until 1791.

== Biography ==
On 21 November 1763, Howard was commissioned a sub-brigadier and cornet in the 1st Troop of Horse Guards, and a brigadier and lieutenant on 21 January 1765. He was a Member of Parliament (MP) for Steyning from 1784 to 1790. On 29 March 1784, he was appointed Secretary and Comptroller of the Household to Queen Charlotte.

Howard inherited the earldom in 1791 from his brother, Thomas Howard, 3rd Earl of Effingham. On 7 September 1803, he was appointed Colonel of the Sheffield Regiment of Volunteers, and became Treasurer to the Queen in 1814, dying in 1816. At his death, the Earldom of Effingham became extinct, while his distant cousin Kenneth succeeded him as Baron Howard of Effingham.

== Notes ==
Parliament of Great Britain
Preceded by John Bullock; Sir Thomas Skipwith, Bt	Member of Parliament for Steyning; 1784–1790; With: Sir John Honywood, Bt 1784–1785; Thomas Edwards Freeman 1785–1788; Sir John Honywood, Bt 1788–1790	Succeeded by Henry Thomas Howard; James Martin Lloyd
Court offices
Preceded by Hon. George North	Secretary and Comptroller to Queen Charlotte; 1784–1814	Succeeded by William Price
Preceded by The Earl of Ailesbury	Treasurer to Queen Charlotte; 1814–1816	Succeeded by Herbert Taylor
Peerage of Great Britain
Preceded by Thomas Howard	Earl of Effingham; 1791–1816	Extinct
Peerage of England
Preceded by Thomas Howard	Baron Howard of Effingham; 1791–1816	Succeeded by Kenneth Howard
