= 2nd Troop of Horse Guards =

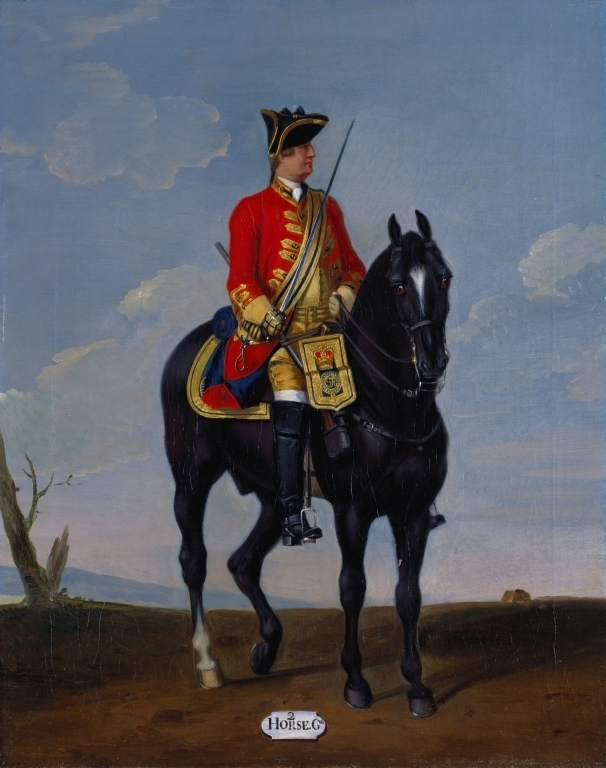
c. 1751 painting of a regimental private

The 2nd Troop of Horse Guards was a British regiment formed in 1659 for Spanish service as Monck's Life Guards. It was successively renamed 3rd, or The Duke of Albemarle's Troop of Horse Guards (1660), 3rd, or The Lord General's Troop of Horse Guards (1661) and, finally, 2nd, or The Queen's Troop of Horse Guards. It fought at the Battle of Dettingen and, in 1746, absorbed the 4th Troop of Horse Guards. In 1788, it absorbed the 2nd Troop Horse Grenadier Guards and was reorganized to become the 2nd Regiment of Life Guards.

== Colonels of the 2nd Troop of Horse Guards ==
Until 1751, British regiments, including the 2nd Troop, were generally known by the name of their colonel, e.g., Howard's Troop of Horse Guards.

- 1659: Sir Philip Howard
- 1685: Lt-Gen. George Fitzroy, 1st Duke of Northumberland
- 1689: Gen. James Butler, 2nd Duke of Ormonde
- 1712: Lt-Gen. George Fitzroy, 1st Duke of Northumberland
- 1715: Gen. Algernon Seymour, 7th Duke of Somerset
- 1740: Gen. Charles Spencer, 3rd Duke of Marlborough
- 1742: Gen. Charles Cadogan, 2nd Baron Cadogan (absorbed 4th Troop of Horse Guards in 1746)
- 1776: Gen. Lord Robert Bertie
- 1782: F.M. Jeffery Amherst, 1st Baron Amherst
