= Troops of Horse Guards =

c. 1672 portrait of a lieutenant colonel of the 1st Troop of Horse Guards

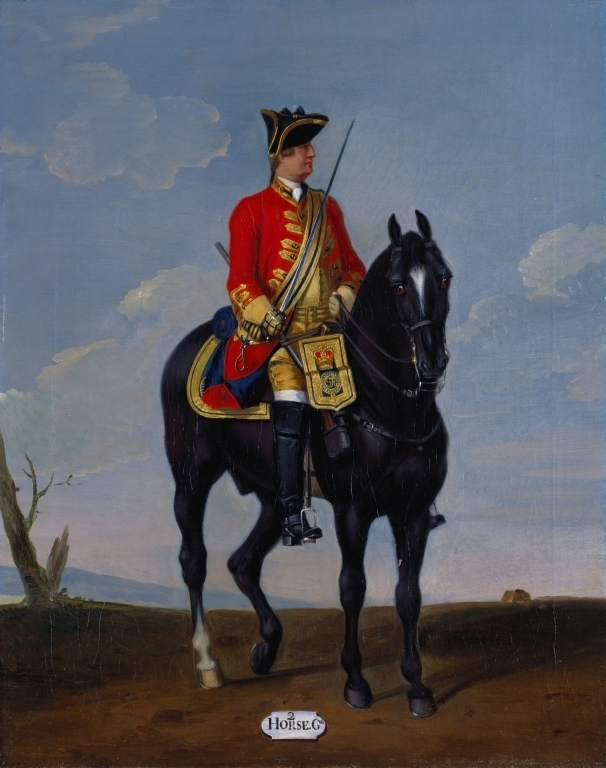
c. 1751 painting of a 2nd Troop of Horse Guards private

In the British Army, the Horse Guards comprised several independent troops raised initially on the three different establishments. In the late 1660s, there were thus three troops in England, one in Ireland, and two in Scotland of which one was ceremonial for attendance of Lord High Commissioner (named after John Middleton, 1st Earl of Middleton and after John Leslie, 7th Earl of Rothes). In 1707, there were four troops of Horse Guards (the three original English and one Scots), and two troops of Horse Grenadiers.

From 1658 to 1788, the Horse Guards existed as independent troops. They were placed on the English establishment in 1661, with the founding of the modern Regular British Army. In 1788, as part of the re-organisation of the British Army, the remaining 1st and 2nd Troops were united with the 1st and 2nd Troops of Horse Grenadier Guards to form, respectively, the 1st and 2nd Regiments of Life Guards.

Originally, as befitted their role as bodyguards to the Sovereign, the ranks of these Troops were filled by members of the gentry. They, therefore, had no non-commissioned officers, their brigadiers (i.e. corporals) being commissioned and ranking as lieutenants, their sub-brigadiers (i.e. sub-corporals) ranking with cornets in the rest of the army. Although this no longer obtains, the non-commissioned officers of their successor regiment, the Life Guards, are still grades of Corporal, rather than sergeants.

== 1st Troop [1658-1788] ==
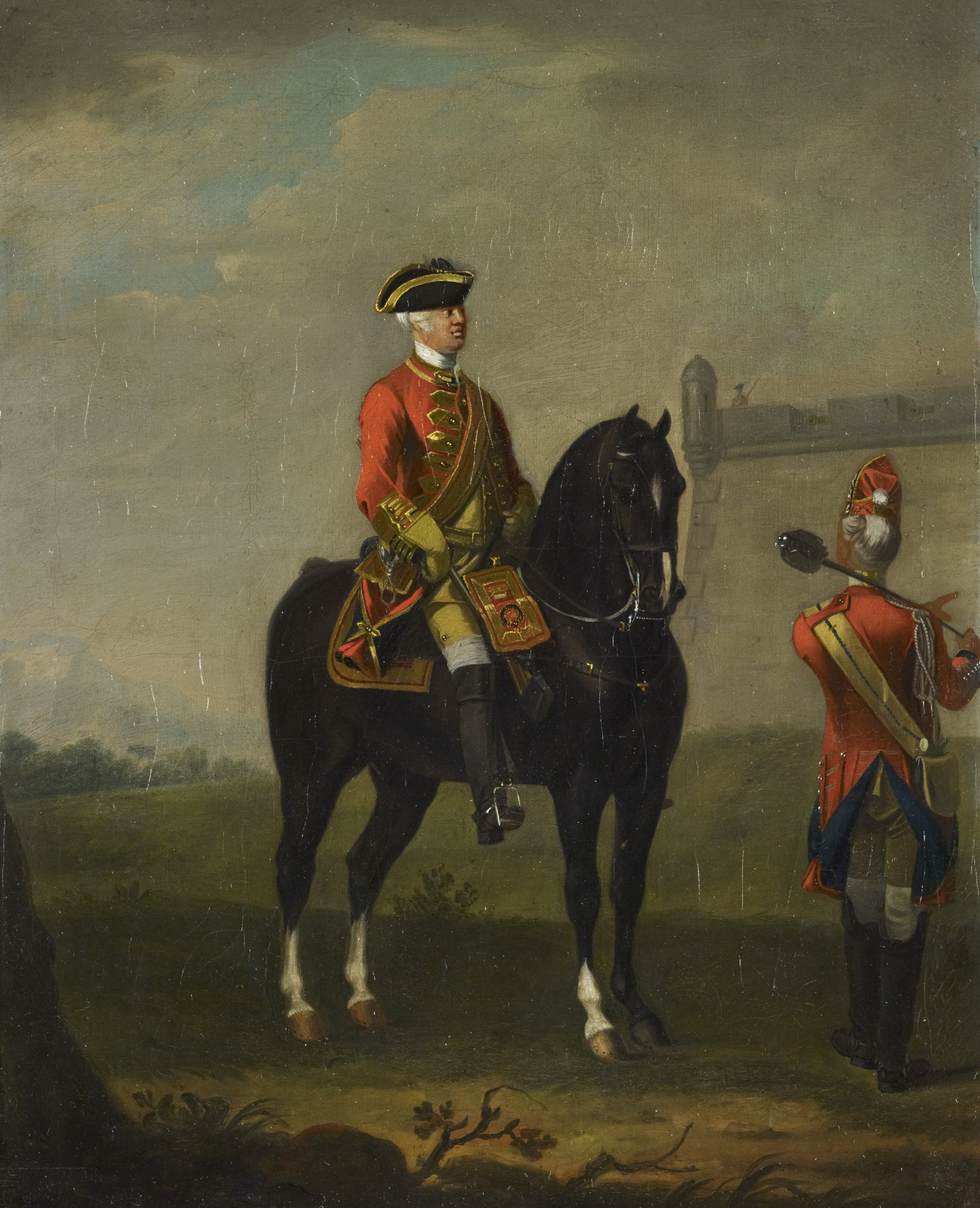
c. 1750 painting of a 1st Troop of Horse Guards private (left)

- 1658-1788 1st (His Majesty's Own) Troop of Horse Guards [formed in exile in Holland from followers of Charles II].
- 1746 absorbed 3rd Troop, The Horse Guards.
- 1788 absorbed 1st Troop, The Horse Grenadier Guards and was reorganised to form the 1st Regiment of Life Guards

== 2nd Troop [1659-1788] ==
- 1659 [raised as a Parliamentary life guard for attending the Council of State].
- Nov 1659 re-modelled as Monck's Life Guards
- 1660-1661 3rd (The Duke of Albemarle's) Troop of Horse Guards.
- 1661-1670 3rd (The Lord General's) Troop of Horse Guards.
- 1670-1788 2nd (The Queen's) Troop of Horse Guards.
- 1788 absorbed 4th Troop, The Horse Guards.
- 1788 On 8 June it absorbs the 2nd Troop, The Horse Grenadier Guards, and on 25 June it is reorganised to form the 2nd Regiment of Life Guards.

== 3rd Troop [1658-1746] ==
- 1658-1670 2nd (The Duke of York's) Troop of Horse Guards [formed in exile in Holland from followers of Charles II]
- 1670-1746 3rd (The Duke of York's) Troop of Horse Guards
- 1746 absorbed by 1st Troop, The Horse Guards.

== Scots and 4th Troop ==
=== 4th Troop [1686-1689] ===
- 1686-1689 4th (Lord Dover's) Troop of Horse Guards [Disbanded upon the deposition of James II.]

=== 4th (Dutch) Troop [1689-1699] ===
- 1599 raised on 30 April in Holland as a troop of horse and redesignated in 1665 as Garde du Corps van Zijne Majesteit, i.e., His Majesties Life Guards.
- 1689-1699 Placed on English establishment in 1689 and returned to Dutch service in 1699 upon conclusion of the Nine Years' War and the Treaty of Ryswick. During this period the Dutch troop was ranked as the 4th Troop of Life Guards. In literature this troop is sometimes confused with the Dutch Regiment of Horse Guards, known as Portland's Horse after its commander William Bentinck, 1st Earl of Portland.
- 1705 The troop lost its Guards status.

=== 4th (Scots) Troop [1709-1746] ===
- 1661-1709 Scots Troop of Horse Guards [raised on the Scottish establishment]
- 1709-1746 4th Troop of Horse Guards [transferred to the British establishment]
- 1746 absorbed by 2nd Troop, The Horse Guards.

== Other Troops ==
=== The Scottish Troop [1661-1676] ===
Raised on the Scottish Establishment for attendance on the Lord High Commissioner to the Parliament of Scotland.

- 1661-1663 The Earl of Middleton's Troop of Horse Guards
- 1664-1676 The Earl of Rothes' Troop of Horse Guards

=== The Irish Troop [1662-1685] ===
- 1662 raised on the Irish Establishment
- 1685 disbanded following the ascent of James II

=== Remarks ===
In some literature reference is made to the existence of a 4th, 5th and 6th Troop of Horse Guards, between 1661 and 1683, 1664 and 1676, and 1664 and 1685, respectively. However, no explicit evidence if found of these troops and it is thought that these 4th, 5th and 6th Troops were confused with the Scots Troop, the (other) Scots Troop for attendance of the Lord High Commissioner, and the Irish Troop.

== Ranks [1766] ==
=== Officers ===
- Captain and Colonel
- First Lieutenant and Lieutenant Colonel
- Second Lieutenant and Lieutenant Colonel
- Guidon and Major

=== Others ===
- Exempt and Captain
- Brigadier or Adjutant and Lieutenant
- Sub-Brigadier and Cornet
- Gentleman
