= British Land Units of the First World War =

During the First World War the British Armed Forces was enlarged to many times its peacetime strength. This was done mainly by adding new battalions to existing regiments (the King's Royal Rifles raised a total of 26 battalions). Although sometimes identified by shoulder titles, generally the new battalions could not be identified from appearance. Consequently, the units in this list have been assembled considering only those as having a uniquely different cap badge.

== Royal Navy ==
Although men of the Royal Navy served on land in many areas throughout the world, the units listed below served as an infantry division in Gallipoli, Belgium and France (the 63rd (Royal Naval) Division).

- 1st (Drake) Battalion
- 2nd (Hawke) Battalion
- 3rd (Benbow) Battalion
- 4th (Collingwood) Battalion
- 5th (Nelson) Battalion
- 6th (Howe) Battalion
- 7th (Hood) Battalion
- 8th (Anson) Battalion
- 9th (Chatham) Battalion RMLI
- 10th (Portsmouth) Battalion RMLI
- 11th (Plymouth) Battalion RMLI
- 12th (Deal) Battalion RMLI
- 9th (Machine Gun) Battalion
- Royal Marine Artillery
- Royal Marine Labour Corps
- Royal Naval Air Service Armoured Car Section
- Royal Naval Air Service

== Cavalry ==
=== Regular ===
The cavalry consisted of Guards (Household Cavalry), Dragoon Guards, Dragoons, Hussars and Lancers. The volunteer cavalry was the Yeomanry.

- 1st Life Guards
- 2nd Life Guards
- Royal Horse Guards
- 1st (King's) Dragoon Guards
- 2nd Dragoon Guards (Queen's Bays)
- 3rd (Prince of Wales's) Dragoon Guards
- 4th (Royal Irish) Dragoon Guards
- 5th (Princess Charlotte of Wales's) Dragoon Guards
- 6th Dragoon Guards (Carabiniers)
- 7th (Princess Royal's) Dragoon Guards
- 1st (Royal) Dragoons
- 2nd Dragoons (Royal Scots Greys)
- 3rd (King's Own) Hussars
- 4th (Queen's Own) Hussars
- 5th (Royal Irish) Lancers
- 6th (Inniskilling) Dragoons
- 7th (Queen's Own) Hussars
- 8th (King's Royal Irish) Hussars
- 9th (Queen's Royal) Lancers
- 10th (Prince of Wales's Own Royal) Hussars
- 11th (Prince Albert's Own) Hussars
- 12th (Prince of Wales's Royal) Lancers
- 13th Hussars
- 14th (King's) Hussars
- 15th (The King's) Hussars
- 16th (The Queen's) Lancers
- 17th (Duke of Cambridge's Own) Lancers
- 18th (Queen Mary's Own) Royal Hussars
- 19th (Queen Alexandra's Own Royal) Hussars
- 20th Hussars
- 21st (Empress of India's) Lancers

=== Special Reserve ===
- North Irish Horse
- South Irish Horse
- King Edward's Horse (The King's Own Overseas Dominion Regiment)

=== Yeomanry ===
- Royal Wiltshire Yeomanry (Prince of Wales's Own Royal Regiment)
- Warwickshire Yeomanry
- Yorkshire Hussars (Alexandra, Princess of Wales's Own)
- Nottinghamshire Yeomanry (Sherwood Rangers)
- Staffordshire Yeomanry (Queen's Own Royal Regiment)
- Shropshire Yeomanry
- Ayrshire (Earl of Carrick's Own) Yeomanry
- Cheshire Yeomanry (Earl of Chester's)
- Queen's Own Yorkshire Dragoons
- Leicestershire Yeomanry (Prince Albert's Own)
- North Somerset Yeomanry
- Duke of Lancaster's Own Yeomanry
- Lanarkshire Yeomanry
- Northumberland Hussars
- Nottinghamshire Yeomanry (South Nottinghamshire Hussars)
- Denbighshire Hussars
- Westmorland and Cumberland Yeomanry
- Pembroke Yeomanry (Castlemartin)
- Royal East Kent Yeomanry (The Duke of Connaught's Own)
- Hampshire Yeomanry
- Royal Buckinghamshire Hussars
- Derbyshire Yeomanry
- Queen's Own Dorset Yeomanry
- Royal Gloucestershire Hussars
- Hertfordshire Yeomanry
- Berkshire Yeomanry
- 1st County of London Yeomanry (Middlesex, Duke of Cambridge's Hussars)
- Royal 1st Devon Yeomanry
- Suffolk Yeomanry (The Duke of York's Own Loyal Suffolk Hussars)
- Royal North Devon Yeomanry
- Queen's Own Worcestershire Hussars
- Queen's Own West Kent Yeomanry
- West Somerset Yeomanry
- Queen's Own Oxfordshire Hussars
- Montgomeryshire Yeomanry
- Lothians and Border Horse
- Lanarkshire Yeomanry (Queen's Own Royal Glasgow and Lower Ward of Lanarkshire)
- Lancashire Hussars Yeomanry
- Surrey Yeomanry (Queen Mary's Regiment)
- Fife and Forfar Yeomanry
- Norfolk Yeomanry (The King's Own Royal Regiment)
- Sussex Yeomanry
- Glamorganshire Yeomanry
- Welsh Horse Yeomanry – formed in 1914
- Lincolnshire Yeomanry
- City of London Yeomanry (Rough Riders)
- 2nd County of London Yeomanry (Westminster Dragoons)
- 3rd County of London Yeomanry (Sharpshooters)
- Bedfordshire Yeomanry
- Essex Yeomanry
- Northamptonshire Yeomanry
- East Riding of Yorkshire Yeomanry
- Lovat Scouts
- Scottish Horse – two regiments with a third formed in 1914

=== War-formed ===
- Household Cavalry Composite Regiment
- Reserve Cavalry Regiments

== Support Arms ==
- Royal Regiment of Artillery consisting of three branches:
  - Royal Horse Artillery
  - Royal Field Artillery
  - Royal Garrison Artillery
- Corps of Royal Engineers including
  - Royal Engineers Signal Service

== Infantry ==
=== Guards ===
- Grenadier Guards
- Coldstream Guards
- Scots Guards
- Irish Guards
- Welsh Guards – formed in 1915
- Guards Machine Gun Regiment
- Household Battalion

=== Regular infantry ===
Most regiments had two regular battalions, supported by associated battalions from the Territorial Force ('part-time' soldiers) and Reserve Battalions. After the start of the war, many new battalions were raised and called "Service Battalions". Service battalions raised from a single locale were often called "Pals battalions".

- Royal Scots (Lothian Regiment)
- Queen's (Royal West Surrey Regiment)
- Buffs (East Kent Regiment)
- King's Own (Royal Lancaster Regiment)
- Northumberland Fusiliers
- Royal Warwickshire Regiment
- Royal Fusiliers (City of London Regiment)
- King's (Liverpool Regiment)
- Norfolk Regiment
- Lincolnshire Regiment
- Devonshire Regiment
- Suffolk Regiment
- Prince Albert's (Somerset Light Infantry)
- Prince of Wales's Own (West Yorkshire Regiment)
- East Yorkshire Regiment
- Bedfordshire Regiment
- Leicestershire Regiment
- Royal Irish Regiment
- Alexandra, Princess of Wales's Own (Yorkshire Regiment)
- Lancashire Fusiliers
- Royal Scots Fusiliers
- Cheshire Regiment
- Royal Welsh Fusiliers
- South Wales Borderers
- King's Own Scottish Borderers
- Cameronians (Scottish Rifles)
- Royal Inniskilling Fusiliers
- Gloucestershire Regiment
- Worcestershire Regiment
- East Lancashire Regiment
- East Surrey Regiment
- Duke of Cornwall's Light Infantry
- Duke of Wellington's (West Riding Regiment)
- Border Regiment
- Royal Sussex Regiment
- Hampshire Regiment
- South Staffordshire Regiment
- Dorsetshire Regiment
- Prince of Wales's Volunteers (South Lancashire Regiment)
- Welsh Regiment
- Black Watch (Royal Highlanders)
- Oxfordshire and Buckinghamshire Light Infantry
- Essex Regiment
- Sherwood Foresters (Nottinghamshire and Derbyshire Regiment)
- Loyal North Lancashire Regiment
- Northamptonshire Regiment
- Princess Charlotte of Wales's (Royal Berkshire Regiment)
- Queen's Own (Royal West Kent Regiment)
- King's Own (Yorkshire Light Infantry)
- King's (Shropshire Light Infantry)
- Duke of Cambridge's Own (Middlesex Regiment)
- King's Royal Rifle Corps
- Duke of Edinburgh's (Wiltshire Regiment)
- Manchester Regiment
- Prince of Wales's (North Staffordshire Regiment)
- York and Lancaster Regiment
- Durham Light Infantry
- Highland Light Infantry
- Seaforth Highlanders (Ross-shire Buffs, The Duke of Albany's)
- Gordon Highlanders
- Queen's Own Cameron Highlanders
- Royal Irish Rifles
- Princess Victoria's (Royal Irish Fusiliers)
- Connaught Rangers
- Princess Louise's (Argyll and Sutherland Highlanders)
- Prince of Wales's Leinster Regiment (Royal Canadians)
- Royal Munster Fusiliers
- Royal Dublin Fusiliers
- Rifle Brigade (Prince Consort's Own)

=== Territorial Force ===
Infantry regiments of just Territorial Force battalions (i.e. no regular or Special Reserve battalions).

- Honourable Artillery Company, T.F.
- Monmouthshire Regiment, T.F.
- Cambridgeshire Regiment, T.F.
- London Regiment, T.F.
- Inns of Court, T.F.
- Hertfordshire Regiment, T.F.
- Herefordshire Regiment, T.F.
- Northern Cyclist Battalion, T.F.
- Highland Cyclist Battalion, T.F.
- Kent Cyclist Battalion, T.F.
- Huntingdonshire Cyclist Battalion, T.F.

=== Others ===
- Royal Militia of the Island of Jersey
- Royal Guernsey Light Infantry

== Services ==
- Machine Gun Corps
  - Motor Machine Gun Service
- Labour Corps
- Army Service Corps
- Royal Army Medical Corps
- Army Veterinary Corps
- Tank Corps
- Army Ordnance Corps
- Army Cyclist Corps
- Royal Flying Corps (not separate at this time, but controlled by the War Office)
- Army Remount Service
- Army Dental Corps
- Royal Army Pay Corps
- Army Chaplain Department

== See also ==
- British Army order of precedence
- List of pals battalions

== Bibliography ==
- Talbot-Booth, E.C. (1941). The British Army, Its History, Customs, Traditions, and Uniforms. London: Sampson Low, Marston & Co. Ltd.
- Doyle, Peter; Foster, Chris (20 July 2010). British Army Cap Badges of the First World War. Shire. ISBN 978-0747807971.
