= Wyndham Portal, 1st Viscount Portal =

British politician

The Right Honourable The Viscount Portal GCMG MVO DSO PC
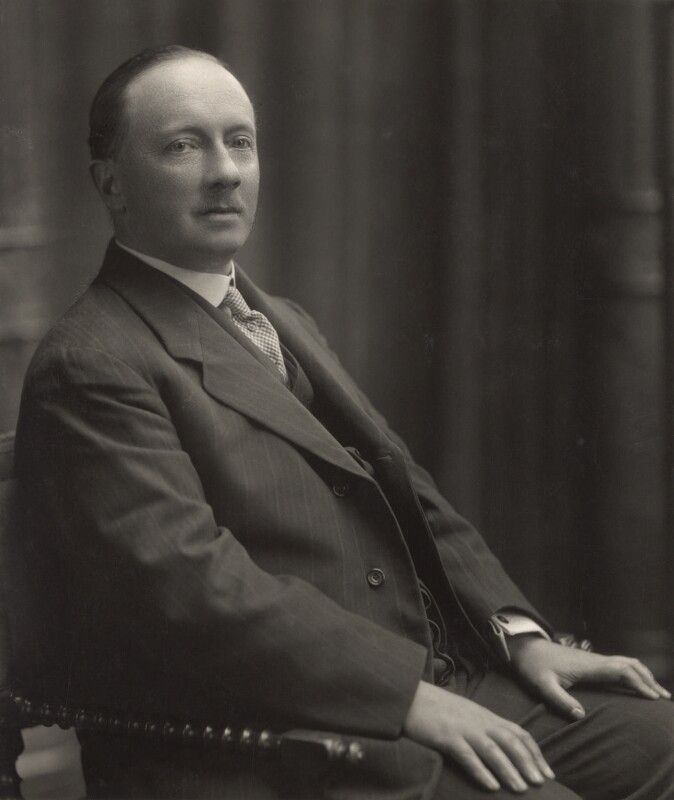
- Photograph by Henry Walter Barnett, c. 1920
- Born: Wyndham Raymond Portal; April 9, 1885
- Died: May 6, 1949 (aged 64)
- Education: Eton College
- Alma mater: Christ Church, University of Oxford
- Occupations: British Army Officer; Politician
- Board member of: Portals Limited; The Rank Organisation; British Olympic Association; Great Western Railway
- Parent(s): Sir William Wyndam Portal, 2nd Baronet, and Florence Elizabeth Mary Glyn
- Awards: Distinguished Service Order

Military service
- Allegiance: United Kingdom
- Branch/service: British Army
- Years of service: 1903– 1911, 1914–1919
- Rank: Lieutenant-Colonel
- Unit: Hampshire Yeomanry; 9th Lancers; 1st Life Guards; Royal 1st Devon Yeomanry; Household Battalion; Machine Gun Corps
- Awards: Distinguished Service Order; Member of the Royal Victorian Order

Wyndham Raymond Portal, 1st Viscount Portal, GCMG, MVO, DSO, PC ( From 9 April 1885 – 6 May 1949), was a British politician.

== Early life ==
The eldest son of Sir William Wyndam Portal, 2nd Baronet, and Florence Elizabeth Mary Glyn, daughter of Hon. St Leger Glyn, 2nd son of George Glyn, 1st Baron Wolverton, he was educated at Eton and Christ Church, Oxford. In 1909 he married Lady Louise Rosemary Kathleen Virginia Cairns, only child of Arthur Cairns, 2nd Earl Cairns.

== Military service ==
He was commissioned into the Hampshire Yeomanry in 1903, was promoted lieutenant in 1905, and transferred to the 9th Lancers later the same year. He transferred to the 1st Life Guards as a second lieutenant in 1908 and was promoted lieutenant again later the same year, but left the Army in 1911. He rejoined the Hampshire Yeomanry in 1914 and served in World War I. He was promoted captain in 1914 while serving as adjutant of the Royal 1st Devon Yeomanry. Transferring back to the Life Guards (Special Reserve) in 1915, he was promoted lieutenant-colonel in 1916 when he took command of the Household Battalion.

He relinquished command of the battalion in 1918 and reverted to the rank of captain, but was soon promoted major and attached to the Machine Gun Corps as a battalion commander, again with the rank of lieutenant-colonel. He resigned his commission in 1919.

== Later life ==
Returning to civilian life, he became chairman of the Portal family's banknote paper mill company in Laverstoke, Portals Limited, in 1919 which had manufactured banknote paper for the Bank of England since 1724. and became the company's chairman when his father died in 1931.

In 1929 he purchased the luxury steam yacht, SY Star of India (built as SY Lady Torfida in 1888 for Sir William Pearce).

In 1936, he was one of the main investors in J. Arthur Rank's General Cinema Finance Corporation, the company which one year later would become the British film industry's most important company, The Rank Organisation. He became General Cinema Finance Corporation's chairman, and worked very closely with J. Arthur Rank for many years.

In 1935, he was made chairman of the Bacon Development Board, and, in April 1939, he was made was regional commissioner for Wales under the Civil Defence Scheme.

In 1940, he became the chairman of the Coal Production Council, and he served in government as Additional Parliamentary Secretary to the Ministry of Supply from 1940 to 1942, and as Minister of Works and Planning from 1942 to 1944.

In 1935, he accepted the chairmanship of the British Olympic Association and thus led the British team in the 1936 Olympic Games in Berlin. That experience made him the perfect president of the 1948 Olympic Games in London.

After the war, in 1945, he became the last chairman of the Great Western Railway (GWR). A GWR Castle Class locomotive, numbered 7000, was named Viscount Portal in his honour in 1946. The GWR ceased to exist upon nationalisation and amalgamation into British Railways in 1948.

Portal was Lord Lieutenant of Hampshire from 1947 until his death in 1949.

== Titles and honours ==
In 1917, he was awarded the Distinguished Service Order and appointed a Member of the Royal Victorian Order (MVO) in the 1918 New Year Honours.

Portal succeeded to his father's baronetcy in 1931. In the 1935 New Year Honours he was raised to the peerage as Baron Portal, of Laverstoke. He was appointed a Privy Counsellor in 1942, created Viscount Portal in the 1945 New Year Honours and appointed a Knight Grand Cross of the Order of St Michael and St George in the 1949 New Year Honours.

On his death in 1949, Portal was succeeded to the baronetcy by his uncle, Sir Spencer Portal as the 4th Baronet.

Political offices
Preceded by Lord Reith	Minister of Works and Planning; 1942–1944	Succeeded by Duncan Sandys
Honorary titles
Preceded by The Lord Mottistone	Lord Lieutenant of Hampshire; 1947–1949	Succeeded by The Duke of Wellington
Peerage of the United Kingdom
New creation	Viscount Portal; 1945–1949	Extinct
New creation	Baron Portal; 1935–1949	Extinct
Baronetage of the United Kingdom
Preceded by William Portal	Baronet (of Malshanger); 1931–1949	Succeeded by Spencer Portal
