= Lord Portal =

Lord Portal may refer to:

- Wyndham Portal, 1st Viscount Portal (1885 – 1949), businessman and politician
- Charles Portal, 1st Viscount Portal of Hungerford (1893 – 1971), RAF officer
