= St Mary's Church, Laverstoke =

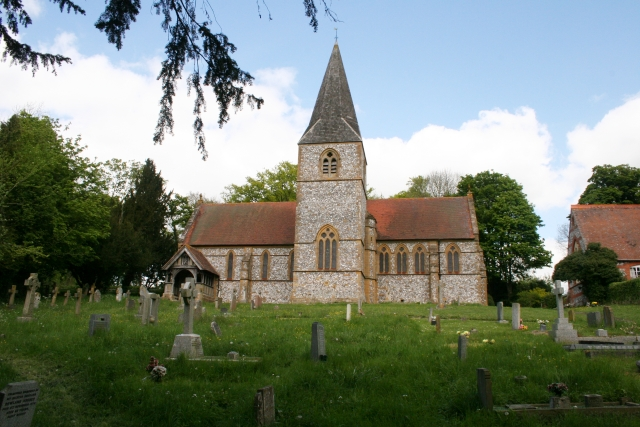
- St Mary's Church, Laverstoke
- St Mary's Church, Laverstoke
- 51°14′12.7″N 1°18′12″W
- OS grid reference: SU 48722 48868
- Location: Laverstoke
- Country: England
- Denomination: Church of England

History
- Dedication: St Mary the Virgin

Architecture
- Heritage designation: Grade II listed
- Architect: John Loughborough Pearson
- Years built: 1896

Administration
- Province: Province of Canterbury
- Diocese: Diocese of Winchester
- Archdeaconry: Winchester
- Deanery: Whitchurch
- Parish: Laverstoke with Freefolk

Clergy
- Vicar: Revd. Ian Keith Smale

St Mary's Church, Laverstoke is a parish church in the Church of England in Laverstoke, Hampshire.

The church is to the east of Laverstoke village, near the small village of Freefolk. It was built in 1896 to designs of the architect John Loughborough Pearson. It was constructed in flint with Bath stone dressings. It has a steeple on the south side containing a chapel.

Pevsner is fairly scathing about the design by Pearson, saying "not a church to do him much credit...Nothing is vaulted, and the only a little more than humdrum feature inside is the wall-passage or detached shafting in the chancel's wall."

== Organ ==
The pipe organ by Wordsworth and Maskell dates from 1896. A specification of the organ can be found on the National Pipe Organ Register.
