= St Nicholas Church, Freefolk =

Coordinates: 51.2346°N 1.3033°W

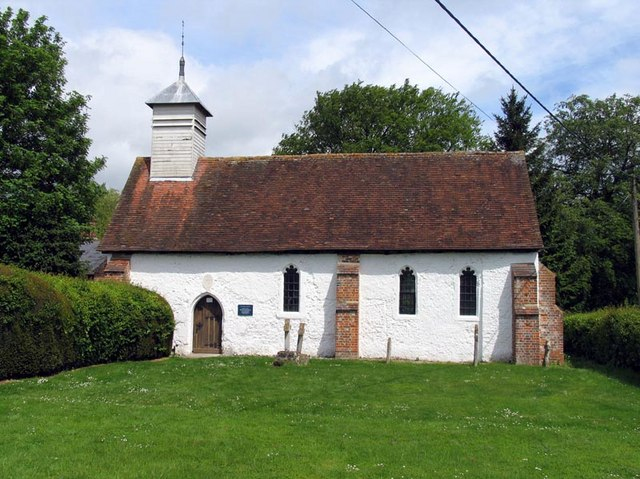
- St Nicholas Church from the south

- Location in Hampshire
- OS grid reference: SU 488 486
- Location: Freefolk, Hampshire
- Country: England
- Denomination: Anglican
- Website: Churches Conservation Trust

History
- Dedication: Saint Nicholas

Architecture
- Functional status: Redundant
- Heritage designation: Grade I
- Designated: 16 May 1966
- Architectural type: Church
- Style: Gothic
- Groundbreaking: 13th century
- Completed: 1703

Specifications
- Length: 36 feet (11.0 m)
- Width: 15 feet 3 inches (4.6 m)
- Materials: Stone, tiled roof

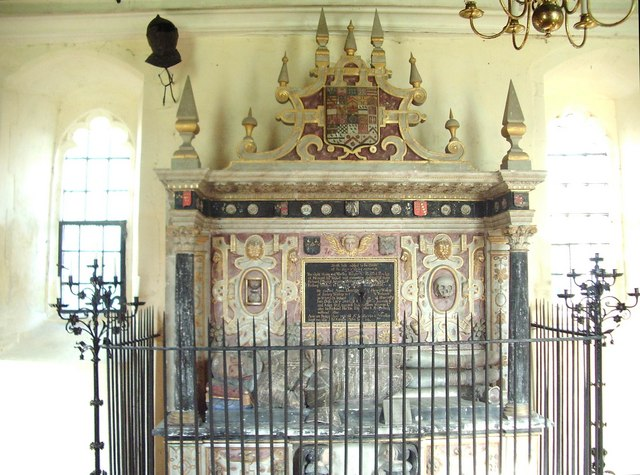
Monument to Sir Richard Powlett

St Nicholas Church is a redundant Anglican church in the village of Freefolk, Hampshire, England. It is recorded in the National Heritage List for England as a designated Grade I listed building, and is under the care of the Churches Conservation Trust. The church stands to the south of the B3400 road and the River Test, some 2 miles (3.2 km) east of Whitchurch.

== History ==
The presence of a church on the site was recorded in the Domesday Book, but the present church dates from the 13th century. The windows and chancel screen were added in the 15th century. In 1703 the interior of the church was remodelled. During the 19th century the parish of Freefolk was united with that of Laverstoke. In 1896 a new, larger church was built to the north, on the other side of the road, and the functions of St Nicholas were transferred to this church, St Mary's, Laverstoke. St Nicholas was declared redundant on 11 December 1974 and was vested in the Churches Conservation Trust on 27 October 1976.

== Architecture ==
=== Exterior ===
The church consists of a single rectangular cell measuring 36 feet (11.0 m) by 15 feet 3 inches (4.6 m). It is constructed in stone rubble with stone dressings. Its walls are partly rendered, and are supported by brick buttresses. The roof is tiled. At the west end of the roof is a weatherboarded bellcote with a lead-covered pyramidal roof. The windows are Perpendicular in style, those on the sides (two on the north, three on the south) having a single light, the west window has two lights and the east window three lights. On the south side is a doorway, above which is a plaque bearing the date 1703.

=== Interior ===
Around the interior of the church is a moulded cornice dating from 1703. On the east wall of the church, on each side of the altar, are painted boards containing the Lord's Prayer and the Creed, and on the south wall is a large board inscribed with the Ten Commandments. On the north wall, opposite the south door, are three layers of wall paintings. To the east of this is the large Jacobean monument to Sir Richard Powlett who died in 1614. This consists of a recumbent effigy on a tomb chest. Two figures kneeling at the front represent his two daughters. The monument is housed in an elaborate surround and enclosed in wrought iron railings. At the west end of the church is a 15th-century screen. Also in the church are two hatchments, a Royal arms dated 1701, and a Victorian font.

== See also ==
- List of churches preserved by the Churches Conservation Trust in South East England
