= Greenall's Gin =

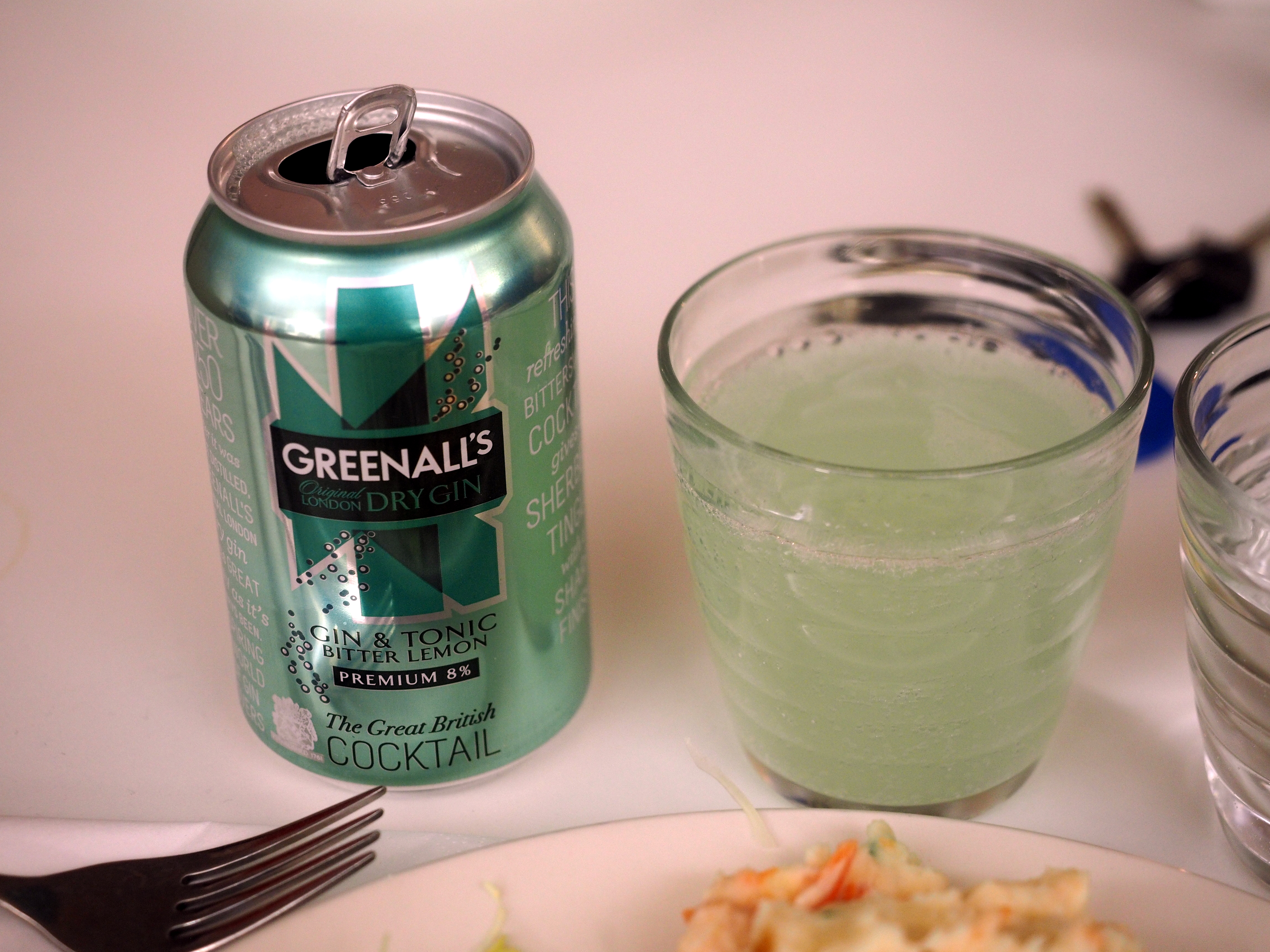
Greenall's Bitter Lemon London Dry Gin & Tonic

Greenall's Gin is a brand of gin that dates back to 1761, and which is distilled by the distillers G&J Distillers, formerly G&J Greenall's, in Warrington, Cheshire, England. Originally founded by Thomas Dakin, the distillers are now part of the Quintessential Brands group. The company claims to be England's oldest gin distillery.

== History ==
Thomas Dakin built his distillery on Bridge Street in Warrington in 1760, although poor grain crops that year meant that he did not distil his first gin until the following year. Thomas Dakin and his descendants continued to own and operate the distillery until 1860, when it was leased to Gilbert and John Greenall, who also owned Greenall's Brewery in nearby St Helens. In 1960 the distillery moved to a larger adjacent site, but much of this was destroyed in a fire in 2005. Three years later the distillery moved to a site in Birchwood, Warrington where Greenall's is still produced today.

In the meantime, Greenall's Brewery had become Greenall Whitley & Co Limited. The company ceased brewing in 1991 to concentrate on running pubs and hotels, and subsequently became the De Vere Group. They sold Greenall's Gin for £7 million in a private equity-backed management buyout in 2011, and the same year the Quintessential Brands - Pioneering Spirits Since 1761 group was founded by former CEO of Campari Enzo Visone, and took over. At that time the distillery produced more than 50 per cent of the UK's own label gin and vodka, including products for Tesco, Sainsbury's and Asda, as well as Bombay Sapphire for Bacardi.

In 2013 Bacardi transferred production of Bombay Sapphire to their own newly created distillery at Laverstoke in Hampshire. As part of this transfer, two of Greenall's stills were moved to Laverstoke.
