= Portal baronets =

Baronetcy in the Baronetage of the United Kingdom

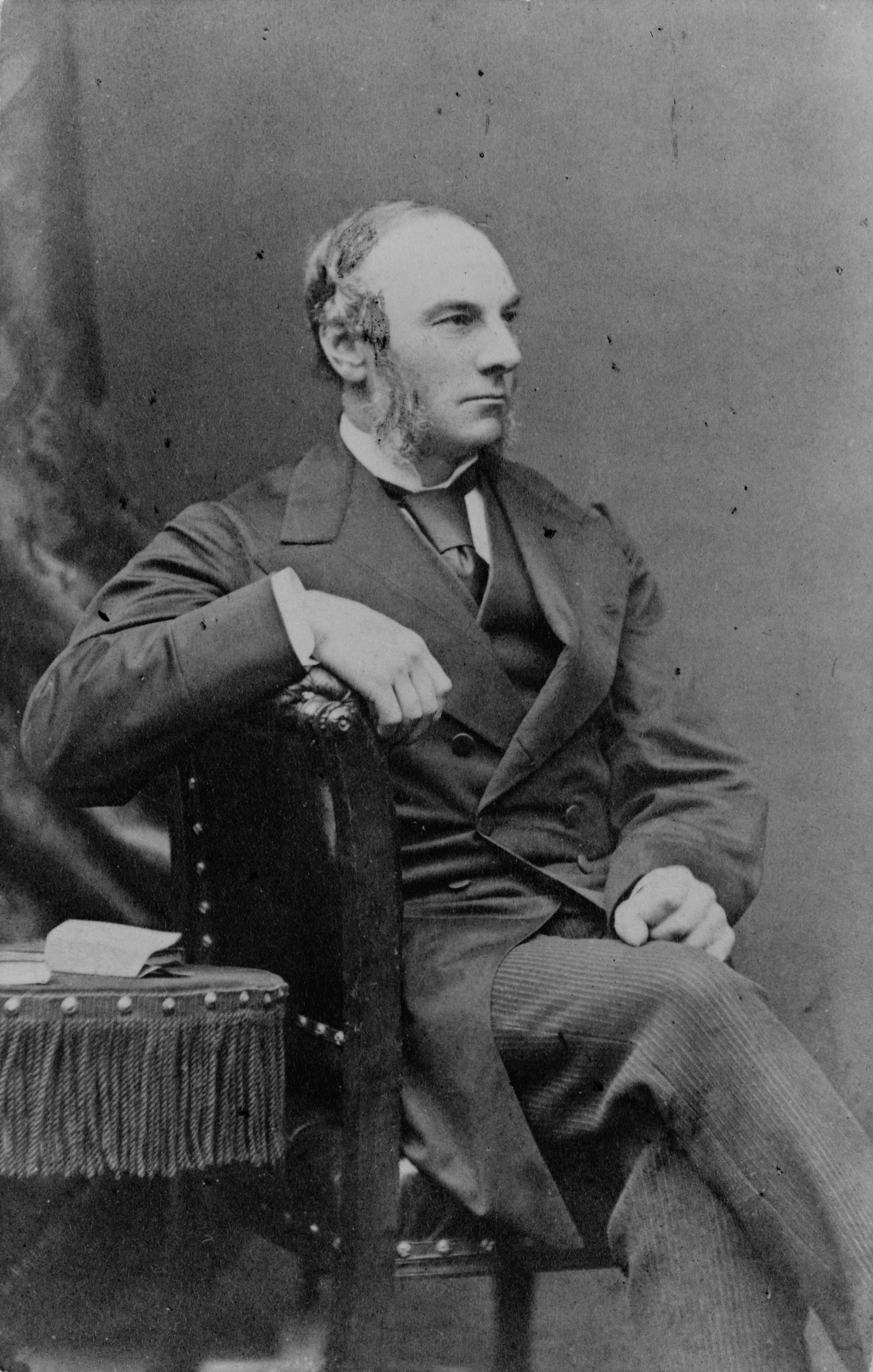
Sir Wyndham Portal, 1st Baronet

The Portal baronetcy, of Malshanger, Church Oakley, in the County of Southampton, is a title in the Baronetage of the United Kingdom. It was created on 18 April 1901 for Wyndham Portal, Chairman of the London and South Western Railway Company. His son, the second Baronet, became chairman of the family's banknote paper mill company in Laverstoke, Portals Limited, which had manufactured banknote paper for the Bank of England since 1724, and deputy chairman of the London and South Western Railway Company. He was succeeded by his son, the third Baronet. He was also chairman of Portals Ltd, and served as Minister of Works during the Second World War. He was created Baron Portal, of Laverstoke in the County of Southampton, in 1935, and Viscount Portal, of Laverstoke in the County of Southampton, in 1945. Both titles were in the Peerage of the United Kingdom. Lord Portal was childless and on his death the peerages became extinct. However, he was succeeded in the baronetcy by his 84-year-old uncle, the fourth Baronet. He was President of the Trustee Savings Banks Association. On his death the title passed to his son, the fifth Baronet. He was chairman and director of Portals Ltd. As of 2026 the title is held by his son, the sixth Baronet, who succeeded in 1984.

Sir Bertram Portal (1866–1949), third son of the first Baronet, was a Brigadier-General in the British Army.

== Portal baronets, of Malshanger (1901) ==
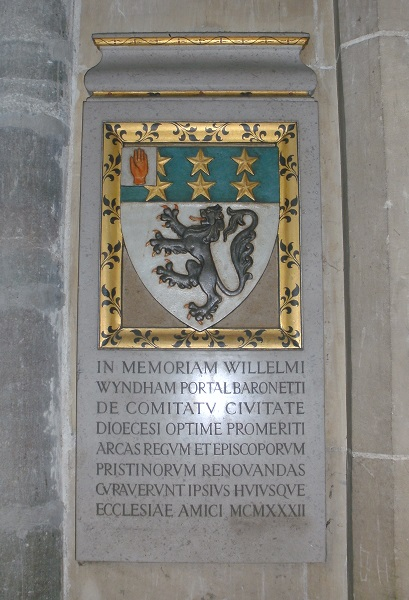
Winchester Cathedral, memorial plaque for Sir William Wyndham Portal, 2nd Bt (1850–1931), with the arms of Portal of Laverstoke rather than those given for the baronetcy

- Sir Wyndham Spencer Portal, 1st Baronet (1822–1905)
- Sir William Wyndham Portal, 2nd Baronet (1850–1931)
- Sir Wyndham Raymond Portal, 3rd Baronet (1885–1949) (created Baron Portal in 1935)

=== Barons Portal (1935) ===
- Wyndham Raymond Portal, 1st Baron Portal (1885–1949) (created Viscount Portal in 1945)

=== Viscounts Portal (1945) ===
- Wyndham Raymond Portal, 1st Viscount Portal (1885–1949)

=== Portal baronets, of Malshanger (1901; reverted) ===
- Sir Spencer John Portal, 4th Baronet (1864–1955)
- Sir Francis Spencer Portal, 5th Baronet (1903–1984)
- Sir Jonathan Francis Portal, 6th Baronet (born 1953)

The heir apparent is the present holder's son William Jonathan Francis Portal (born 1987).

Baronetage of the United Kingdom
Preceded by Gunter baronets	Portal baronets of Malshanger; 18 April 1901	Succeeded by Church baronets
