= Wordsworth and Maskell =

Wordsworth and Maskell was a British firm of church organ makers, established in 1866 in Leeds, West Yorkshire. It produced around sixty organs for churches in Lancashire, around 23 for churches in Lincolnshire, over 50 in Leeds (along with 15 rebuilds) and around 30 in the rest of Yorkshire, along with others for countries of the British Empire. Their largest instrument was for the parish church in Epping, Essex, an 1895 four-manual.

== Selected organs ==
- 1875 – St Peter's Church, East Bridgford, Nottinghamshire
- 1876 – St Helen's Church, Brant Broughton, Lincolnshire
- 1877–1885 – Church of the Holy Angels, Hoar Cross, Staffordshire
- 1881 – St Andrew's Church, Lincoln
- 1883 – St John the Baptist's Church, Collingham, Nottinghamshire
- 1883 – St Luke's Church, Enmore, New South Wales
- 1883 – St Peter and St Paul, Heydon, Norfolk
- 1883 – St Salvador's Church, Dundee
- 1885 – St Giles' Church, Wimborne St Giles, Dorset
- 1885 – St Agnes and St Pancras Church, Toxteth Park, Liverpool
- 1886 – East Street Methodist Free Church, Leeds
- c. 1890 – All Saints Church, Holdenby, Northamptonshire
- 1896 – St Mary's Church, Laverstoke, Hampshire
- c. 1900 – St Peter's Church, Lowick, Northamptonshire
