= De Vere (hotel operator) =

Hotels and leisure business

- Type: Private
- Industry: Hotels
- Founded: 1762; 264 years ago
- Headquarters: Harrogate, UK
- Key people: James Burrell (Group CEO)
- Website: devere.co.uk

De Vere is a hotels and leisure business, which until the 1990s was a brewing company known as Greenall's. It used to be listed on the London Stock Exchange (LSE) and was once a constituent of the FTSE 100 Index.

== History ==
Greenall's Brewery was founded by Thomas Greenall in 1762. Initially based in St Helens, the company established a second brewery at Wilderspool, south of Warrington in 1787.

It bought the Groves & Whitnall Brewery in Salford in 1961, Shipstone's Brewery in Nottingham in 1978 and Davenport's Brewery in Birmingham in 1986. For much of the 20th century, the company traded as Greenall Whitley & Co Limited. The St Helens brewery was demolished in the 1970s to make way for a new shopping centre. The Warrington brewery on the edge of Stockton Heath was bought by Bruntwood, renamed Wilderspool Business Park and is now let to office occupiers.

The company ceased brewing in 1991 to concentrate on running pubs and hotels.

In 1999, the tenanted wing of the Greenall's operation was sold to the Japanese bank, Nomura for £370 million and the main Greenall's operation, involving 770 pubs and 69 budget lodges, was sold to Scottish and Newcastle for £1.1 billion. Greenalls started to focus its resources on its De Vere and Village Leisure hotel branding at that time.

In February 2005, Greenalls sold The Belfry to The Quinn Group for £186 million.

The Greenall family connection remained as Lord Daresbury, the descendant of the original founder, remained the non-executive chairman. This tie was severed in 2006 when Daresbury stepped down from the post and much of the family's interest was sold.

In 2006, the business, by then known as De Vere Group, was acquired by The Alternative Hotels Group plc, a joint venture between HBOS and eight investors led by Richard Balfour-Lynn, for £745.5 million. The Alternative Hotels Group plc renamed itself De Vere Group in 2010.

De Vere Group sold Greenall's Gin for £7 million in a private equity-backed management buyout in 2011. Balfour-Lynn also stood down as chief executive in 2011.

In March 2014, private equity firm Starwood Capital Group acquired the business, by then known as De Vere Venues, and integrated it into Principal Hayley Group which it already owned.

In November 2014, Village Urban Resorts were sold to Denver-based private equity firm KSL Capital Partners for £485 million.

In November 2016, Principal Hayley Group went through a major rebranding and re-investment project; the group became known as the Principal Hotel Company and split their portfolio between two groups of hotels: De Vere (a group of modern country estate hotels) and Principal (a group of luxury city hotels).

== Operations ==
Greenall's ales are distributed by Carlsberg and brewed for them by Molson Coors in Burtonwood, near Warrington. Greenall's ales can still be bought in some pubs in the North West of England, although they are gradually disappearing. Often, only Greenall's Mild can be found. Greenall's Bitter is 3.6% ABV. Greenall's Mild is 3.1%.
