= Laverstoke Mill =

Distillery and former paper mill in England

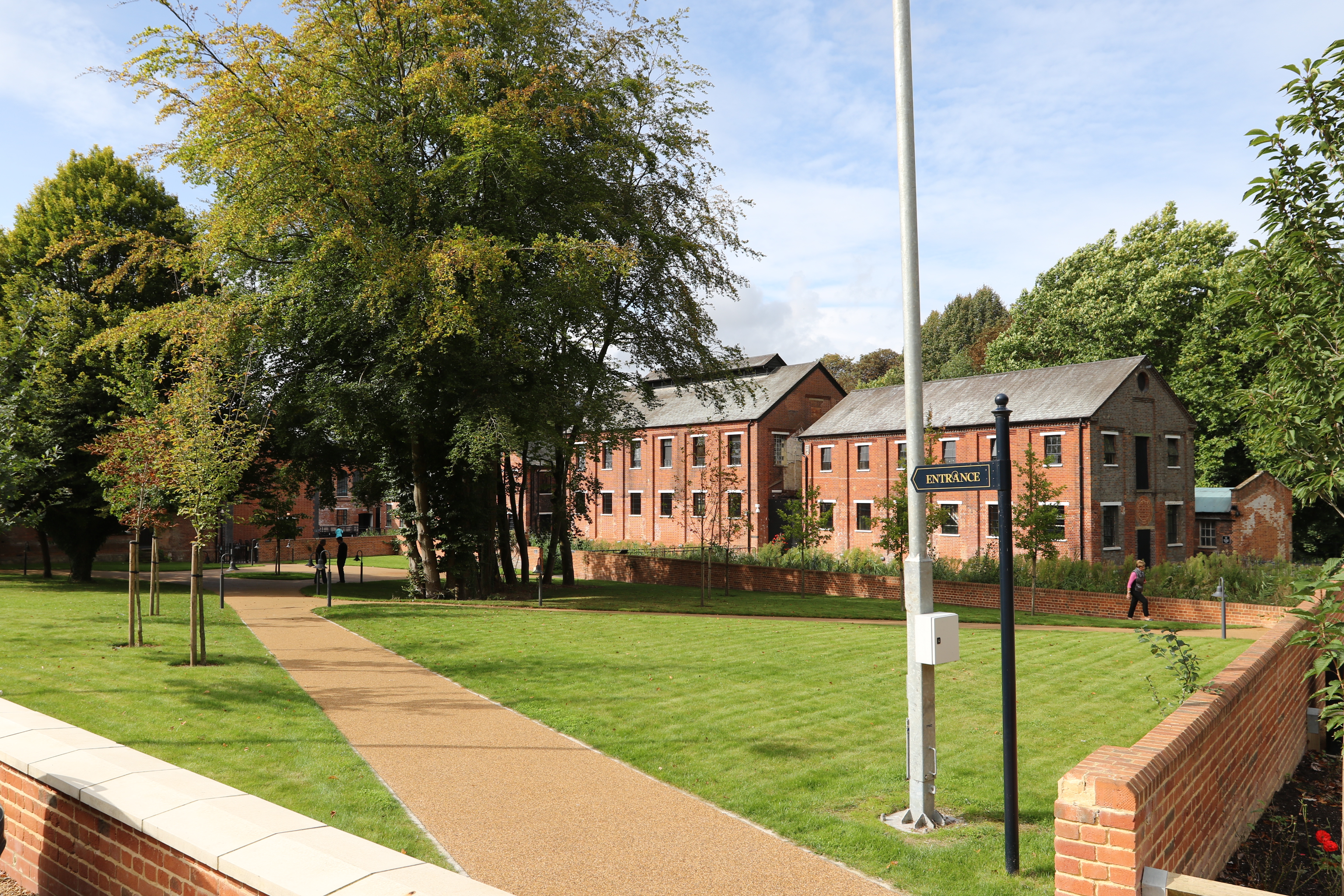
- Laverstoke Mill – entrance to visitor centre

- Location within Hampshire
- 51°14′06″N 1°17′47″W
- Type: Watermill
- Location: Laverstoke
- OS grid reference: SU 49244 48641

Site notes
- Area: Hampshire

Listed Building – Grade II
- Official name: Mill House
- Designated: 12 April 1984
- Reference no.: 1092686

Listed Building – Grade II
- Official name: Former mill cottages at Laverstoke Mill
- Designated: 12 April 1984
- Reference no.: 1339658

Listed Building – Grade II
- Official name: Former wheel house and glazing house at Laverstoke Mill
- Designated: 10 January 1953
- Reference no.: 1092687

Laverstoke Mill is a former paper mill located on the River Test in Laverstoke near Overton, Hampshire, England. The mill complex contains three Grade II listed buildings: the Mill House, Mill Cottages, and the Glazing House. After a major refurbishment between 2011 and 2013, the mill is now the distillery and visitor centre for Bombay Sapphire gin.

== History ==
Laverstoke Mill is recorded as far back as Domesday Book in 1086, in which a corn mill is recorded as being on the site. The site was leased by Henry Portal in 1718 and converted into a paper mill, becoming part of the Portals business. In the 1720s, Portal obtained the contract for the supply of paper to the Bank of England for use in banknotes, and the production of paper for currency and other secure uses would become the main use of the site. The site was expanded in 1842, and again in 1881, to allow for increased production. In 1860, new buildings, including the large India House, were built for a contract for the supply of paper for the Indian Rupee.

By the start of the 20th century, Laverstoke had become old fashioned and inefficient in comparison to other mills. In a report of 1920, Sir William Portal commented 'economy is a difficult word to introduce into Laverstoke Mills'. Instead, between 1920 and 1922, the company built a new mill, Overton Mill, in the nearby village of Overton. From the 1930s, Laverstoke increasingly specialised in research and development in the fields of engineering, manufacture and security. Paper making ceased at the site in 1963, and in 1972, the site was taken over by Patterson Candy, a subsidiary company who used it for the manufacture of water treatment equipment. Portals were taken over by De La Rue in 1995 and the site became vacant in 2005.

The mill was purchased by the Bombay Spirits Company in 2010. The new owners refurbished the site, reusing existing buildings for distilling and a visitor centre, café, bar and shop. New glasshouses, designed by the Heatherwick Studio, were constructed to display examples of the plants used for the gin botanicals. The River Test, which had been covered over as the mill expanded, was opened out to become a feature of the site again.

== Gallery ==
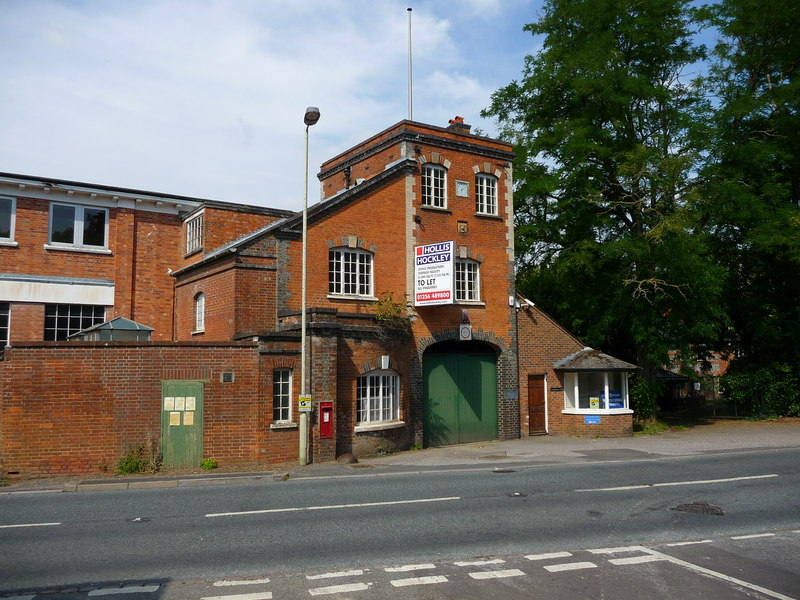
The gatehouse before renovation, 2010

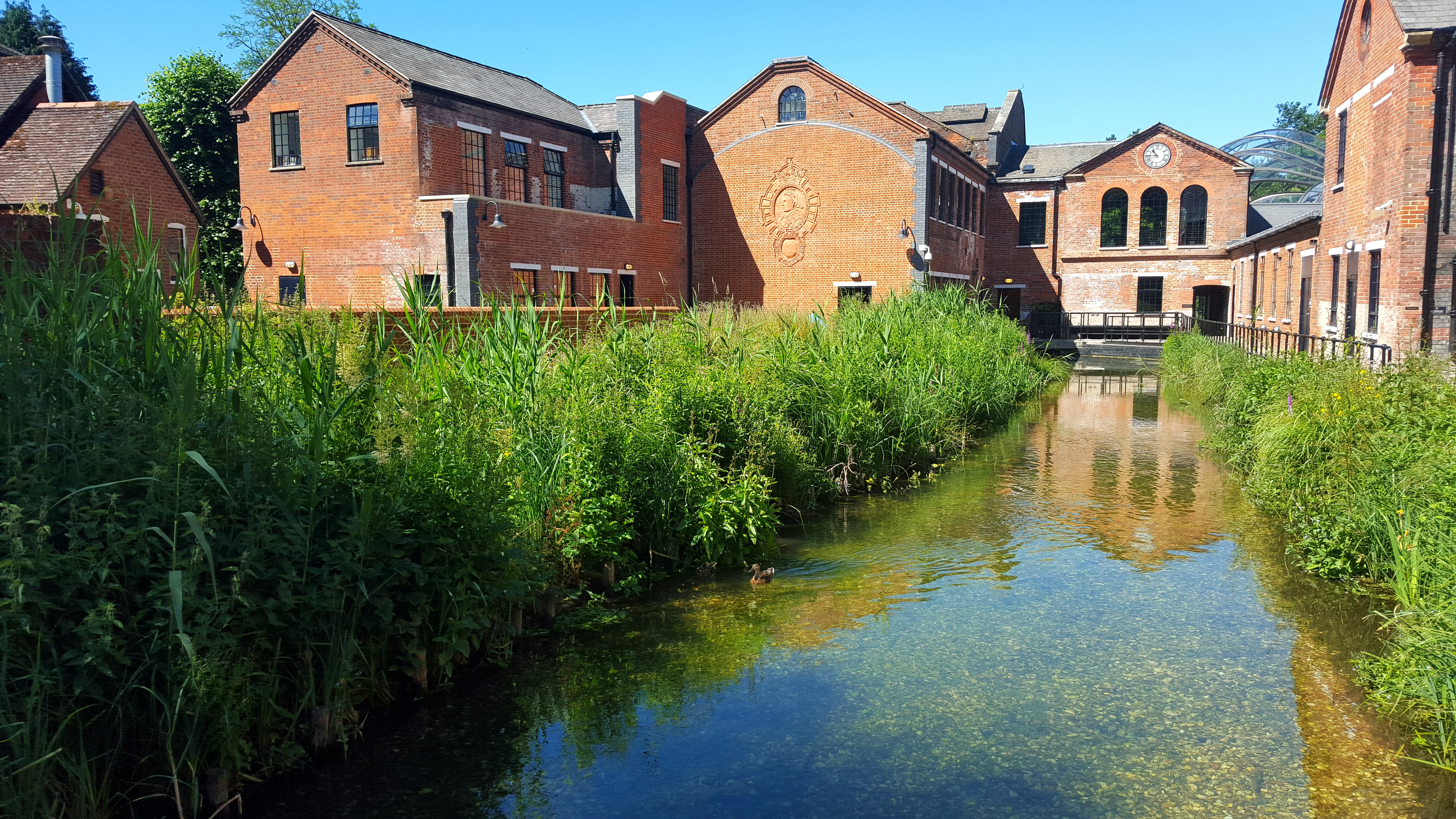
The River Test with shop and bar to left, visitor centre ahead, 2015
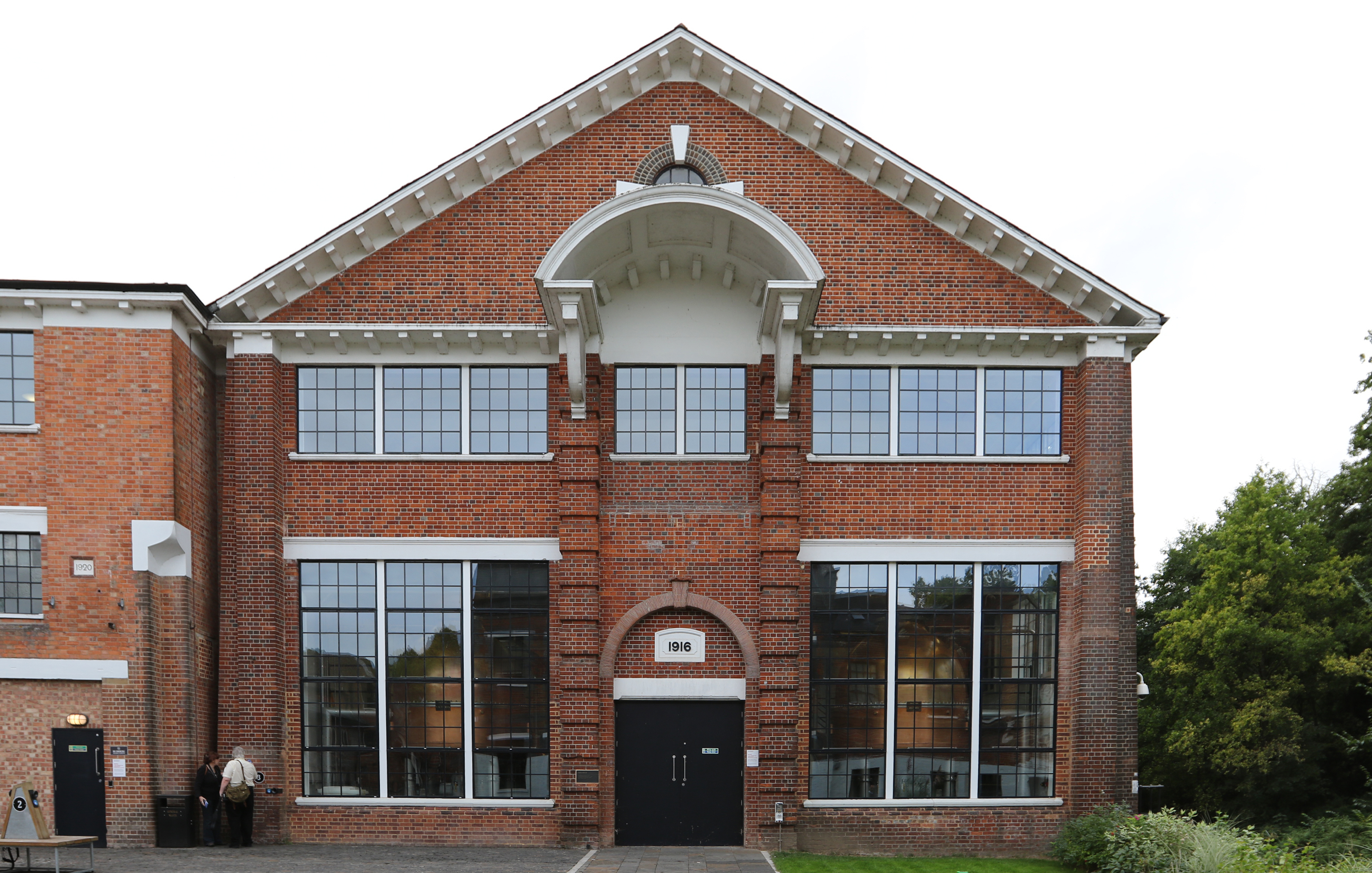
India House, housing the stills Victoria and Henry, 2016

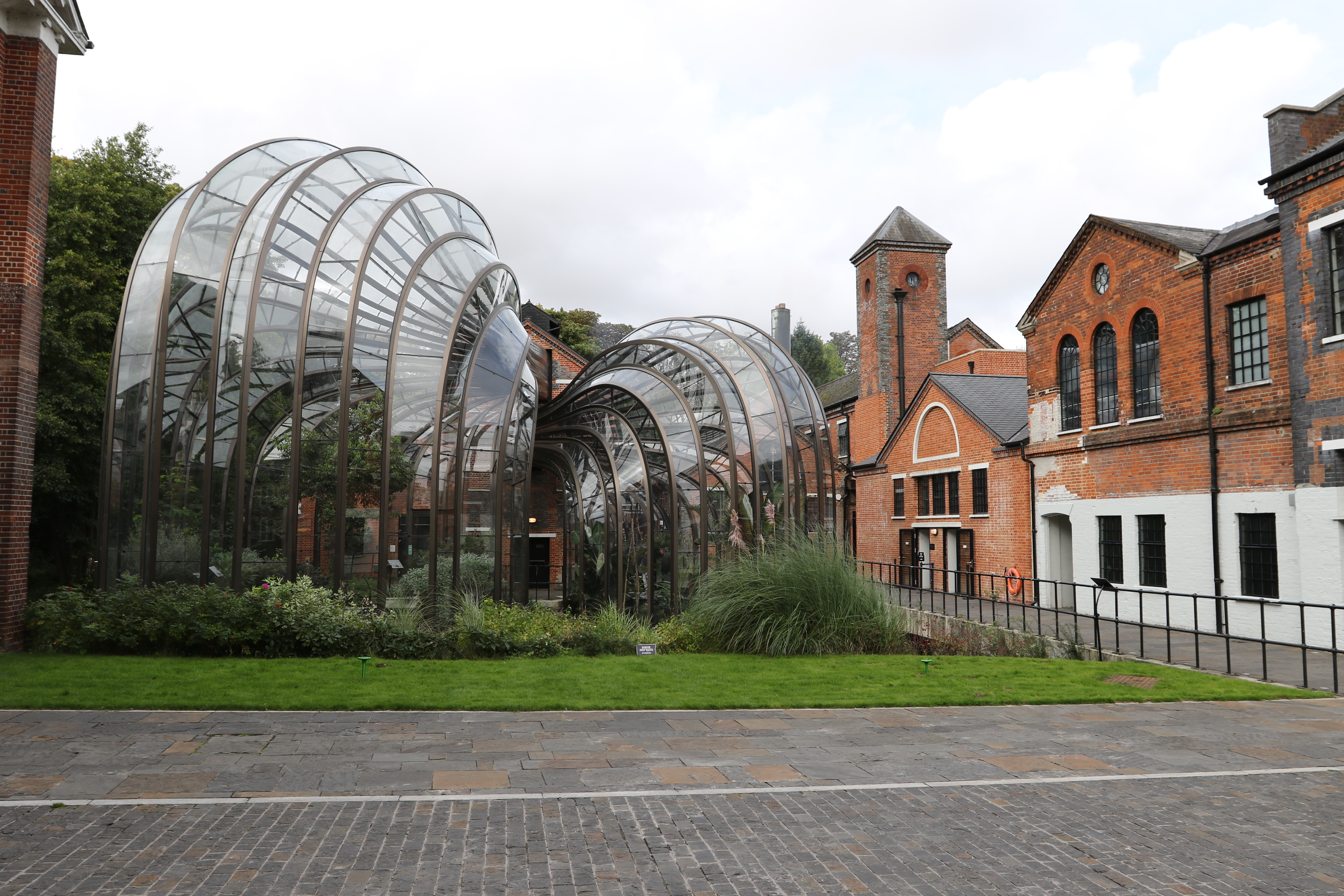
The glasshouses with visitor centre to left, 2016

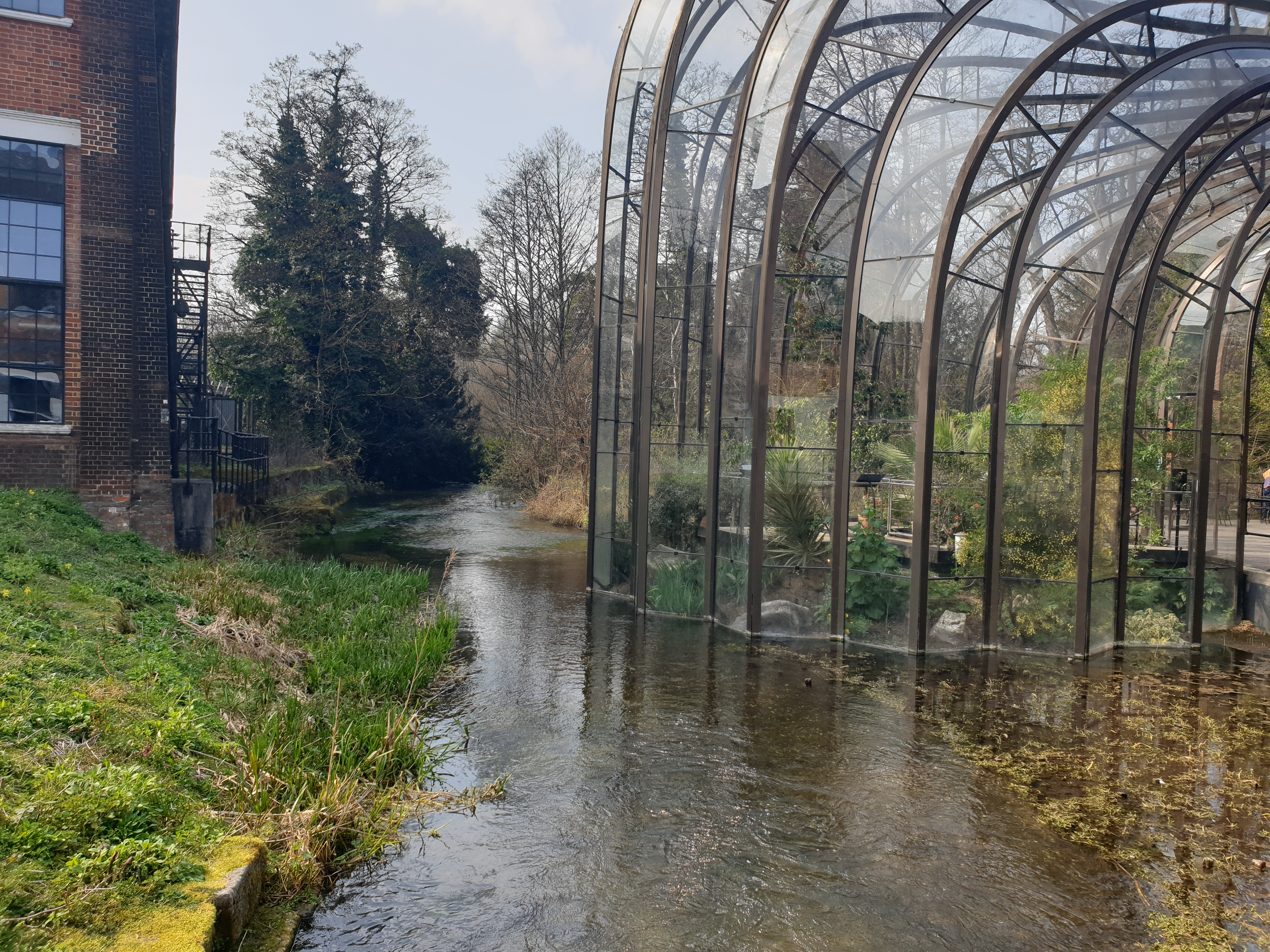
The glasshouses and the River Test, 2022

== See also ==
- List of watermills in the United Kingdom
