= Bombay Sapphire =

Brand of gin

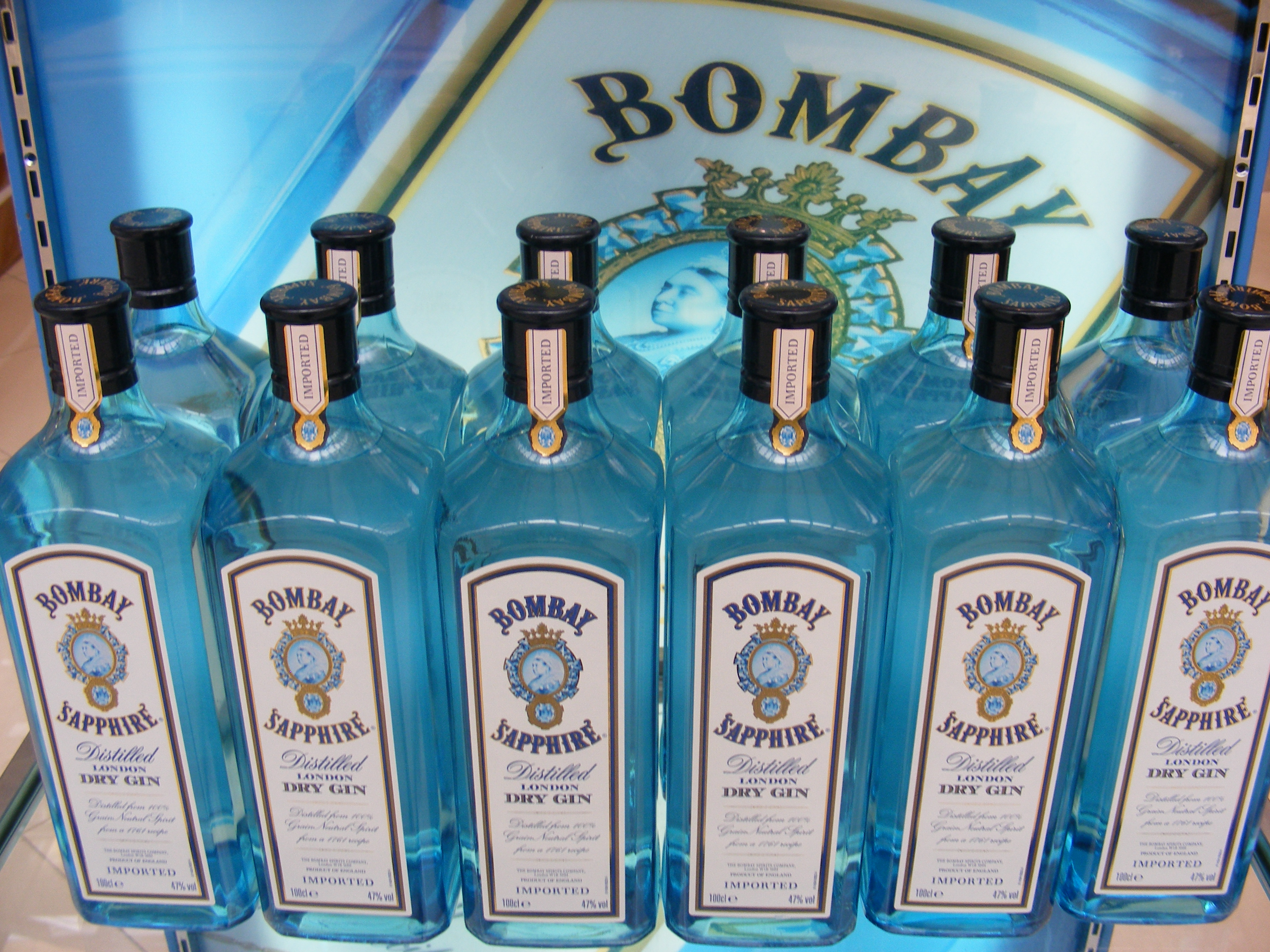
- Type: Gin
- Manufacturer: Bombay Spirits Co., Ltd.
- Distributor: Bacardi
- Origin: England
- Introduced: 1986
- Alcohol by volume: 40% (UK, Nordic countries, continental Europe, Canada, Australia); 47% (US and export/duty-free)
- Proof (US): 80 (UK, Nordic countries, continental Europe, Canada, Australia); 94 (US and export/duty-free)
- Colour: Clear
- Related products: Bombay Original Dry
- Website: bombaysapphire.com

Bombay Sapphire is a brand of infused London dry gin distilled by the Bombay Spirits Company, a subsidiary company of Bacardi, at Laverstoke Mill in the village of Laverstoke in the English county of Hampshire.

The brand was first launched in 1986 by English wine-merchant International Distillers & Vintners. In 1997 Diageo sold the brand to Bacardi. Its name originates from the gin and tonic popularised by the Royal Indian Armed Forces during the British Raj in colonial India; "Bombay" refers to the Indian city and "Sapphire" refers to the violet-blue Star of Bombay which was mined from British Ceylon (Sri Lanka), and is now on display at the Smithsonian Institution. Bombay Sapphire is marketed in a flat-sided, sapphire-coloured bottle that bears a picture of Queen Victoria on the label.

The flavouring of the drink comes from ten ingredients: almond, lemon peel, liquorice, juniper berries, orris root, angelica, coriander, cassia, cubeb, and grains of paradise. Alcohol brought in from another supplier is evaporated three times using a carterhead still, and the alcohol vapours are passed through a mesh/basket containing the ten botanicals to gain flavour and aroma. This is felt to give the gin a lighter, more floral taste compared to gins created using a copper pot still. Water from Lake Vyrnwy, a reservoir in Powys, Wales is added to bring the strength of Bombay Sapphire down to 40.0% (UK, the Nordics, several continental European markets, Canada and Australia).

The 47.0% version is the standard for sale at duty-free shops in all markets.

== Production ==
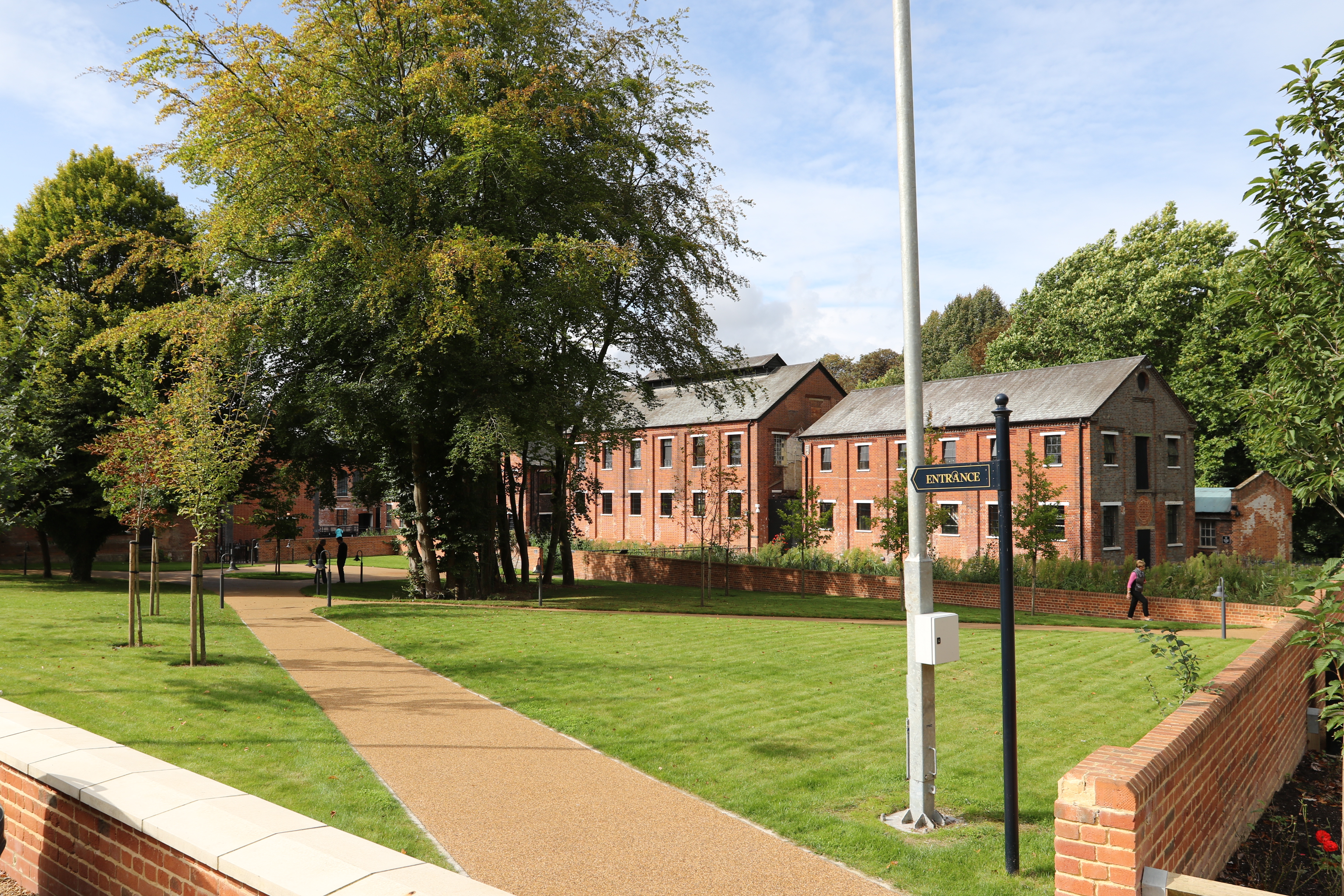
Laverstoke Mill, Hampshire

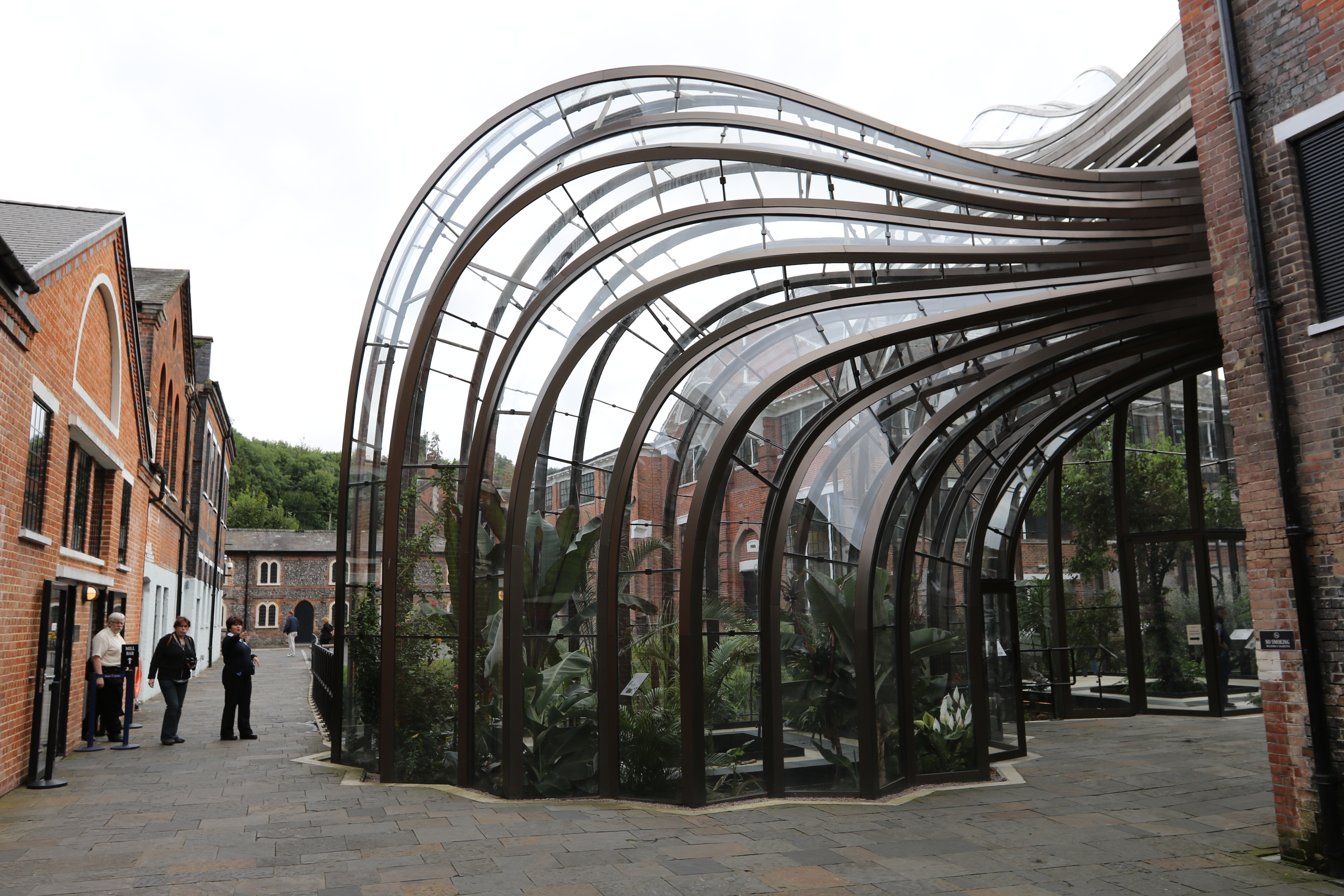
Glasshouses by Thomas Heatherwick for growing the botanicals

Until 2013, production and bottling of Bombay Sapphire was contracted out by Bacardi to G&J Greenall in Warrington, Cheshire. However, in 2011, plans were announced to move the manufacturing process to a new facility at Laverstoke Mill in Laverstoke, Hampshire. These plans included the restoration of the former Portal's paper mill at the proposed site and the construction of a visitor centre.

Bombay Sapphire is produced by vapor infusing botanicals into 96.3% ABV wheat grain neutral spirit purchased from a third party supplier.

Planning permission was granted in February 2012, and the centre opened to the public in the autumn of 2014. The visitor centre included a new construction by Thomas Heatherwick of two glasshouses for plants used as botanicals in the production of Bombay Sapphire gin. As part of the transfer of production, two of Greenall's stills were moved from Warrington to Laverstoke.

After production was shifted to Laverstoke, bottling of the drink remained contracted out by G&J Greenall, with the undiluted gin being tankered to Warrington for dilution and bottling. Bottling has subsequently been shifted to Glasgow in Scotland.

== Varieties ==
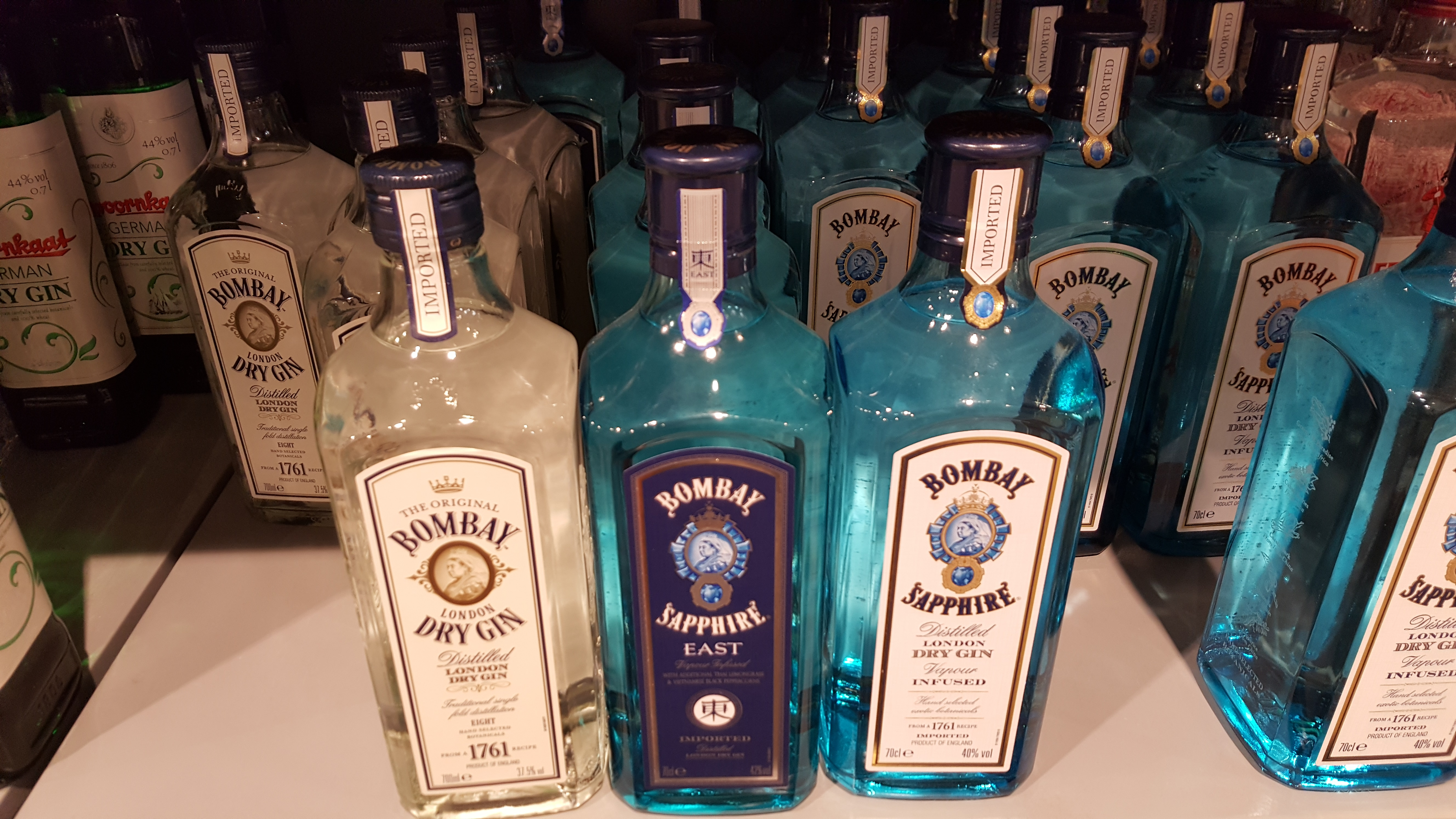
Three of the Bombay varieties

Bacardi also markets Bombay Original London Dry Gin (or Bombay Original Dry). Eight botanical ingredients are used in the production of the Original Dry variety, as opposed to the ten in Bombay Sapphire. Wine Enthusiast preferred it to Bombay Sapphire.

In September 2011, Bombay Sapphire East was launched in test markets in New York and Las Vegas. This variety has another two botanicals, lemongrass and black peppercorns, in addition to the original ten. It is bottled at 42% and was designed to counteract the sweetness of most tonic water.

A special edition of Bombay gin called Star of Bombay was produced in 2015 for the UK market. It is bottled at 47.5% and is distilled from grain. It features bergamot and ambrette seeds in harmony with Bombay's signature botanicals. This version has later been extended to several other markets.

Bombay Bramble is a variety infused with blackberries and raspberries and bottled at 37.5% ABV.

In the summer of 2019, Bacardi launched a limited edition gin called Bombay Sapphire English Estate, which features three additional English-sourced botanicals: Pennyroyal Mint, rosehip and hazelnut. It is bottled at 41%.

== Cultural references ==
- Bombay Sapphire was used in the video work Victoria Day (Bombay Sapphire), 2002 by contemporary artists Marina Roy and Abbas Akhavan.
- American hip-hop artist Wiz Khalifa and his "Taylor Gang" are also known for their love of Bombay Sapphire dry gin.
- Former Las Vegas, Nevada mayor Oscar Goodman is known for his love of Bombay Sapphire Gin, and he has served as a spokesman for the brand.
- American country singer-songwriter and entertainer Robert Earl Keen references "a quart of Bombay gin" in the song "The Road Goes on Forever".
- American YouTuber and live streamer Etika was known for drinking Bombay Sapphire, among other alcoholic drinks, during streams as a way to celebrate donations.
- English rapper and former YouTuber Scarlxrd has shown his love for Bombay Sapphire in music videos early on in his career, such as "Glx up"
- The gin is referenced in the Kaytranada song 4EVA
