= Household Cavalry Composite Regiment =

- Active: 1882; 1889–1900; 4 August–11 November 1914; 1939–1945
- Country: United Kingdom
- Allegiance: British Crown
- Branch: British Army
- Type: Cavalry
- Size: Regiment
- Part of: 4th Cavalry Brigade (World War I and World War II)
- Engagements: Anglo-Egyptian War Second Boer War; World War I Western Front World War II Anglo-Iraqi War Syria-Lebanon Campaign

The Household Cavalry Composite Regiment was a temporary, wartime-only, cavalry regiment of the British Army consisting of personnel drawn from the 1st Life Guards, 2nd Life Guards and Royal Horse Guards. It was active in 1882 for service in the Anglo-Egyptian War, in 1889–1900 during the Second Boer War, from August to November, 1914 during the opening months of World War I and in World War II.

== Anglo-Egyptian War ==
The regiment was first formed in 1882 to take part in the Anglo-Egyptian War.

== Second Boer War ==
The regiment was re-raised and served in the Second Boer War. A formation of the 12th Royal Lancers and the Household Cavalry undertook a successful charge at the Battle of Diamond Hill in June 1900.

== World War I ==
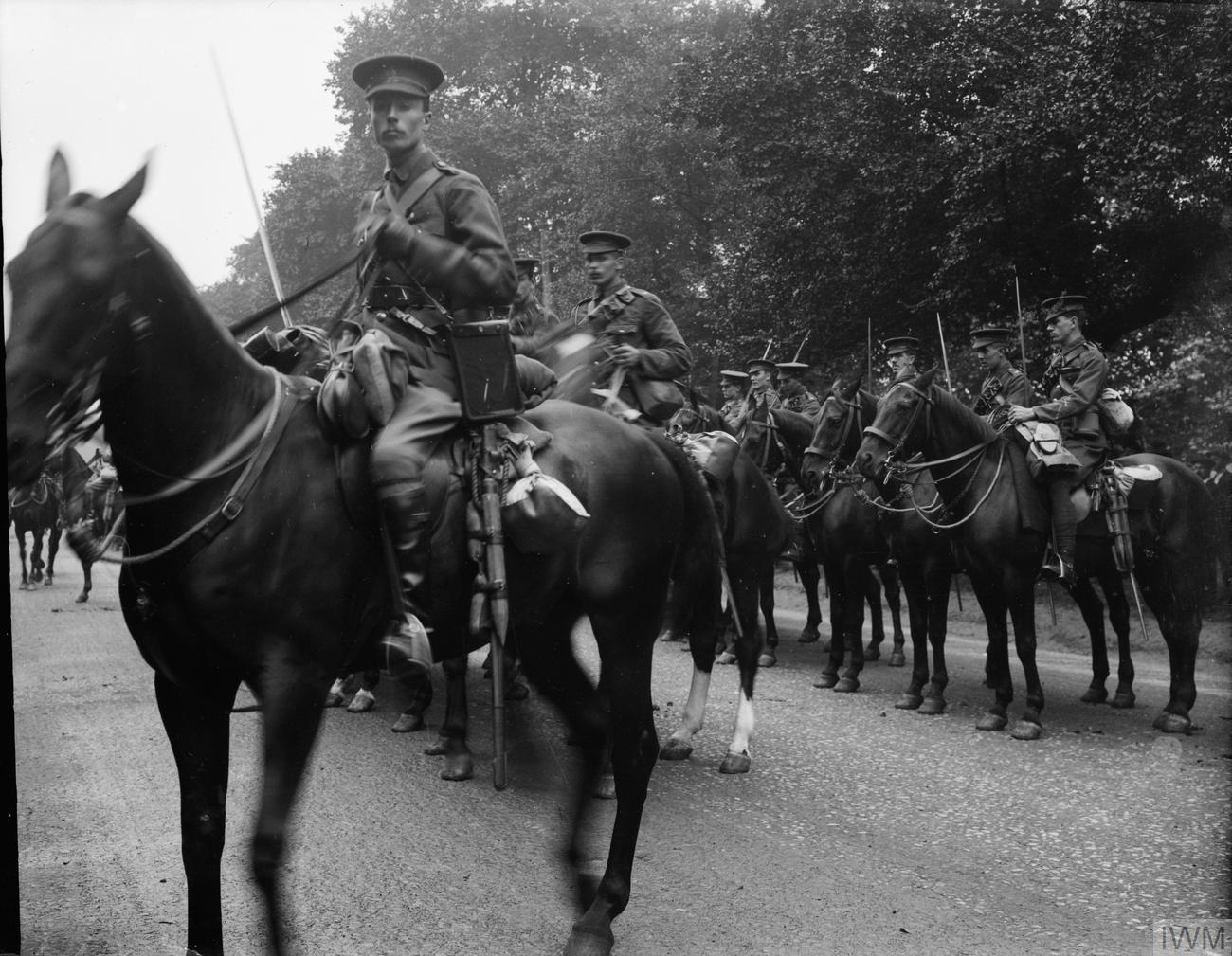
Squadron from the 1st Life Guards August 1914, attached to the Household Cavalry Composite Regiment, preparing to leave for France.

When the British Expeditionary Force was mobilised, it had a war establishment of 17 cavalry regiments – five cavalry brigades of three regiments each, and two regiments which would be broken up to serve as reconnaissance squadrons, one for each of the six infantry divisions. The peacetime establishment in the United Kingdom was 19 cavalry regiments – 16 line regiments, and the three regiments of the Household Cavalry.

The 16 regular regiments were earmarked for overseas service, whilst the 17th regiment was to be provided by a composite regiment formed with a squadron from each of the three Household Cavalry regiments – the 1st Life Guards, the 2nd Life Guards, and the Royal Horse Guards – and assigned a mobilisation role in 4th Cavalry Brigade.

=== Mobilisation ===
On the outbreak of war on 4 August 1914, the regiment was duly constituted with a squadron each from the 1st Life Guards at Hyde Park, the 2nd Life Guards at Regent's Park and the Royal Horse Guards at Windsor. The regiment joined 4th Cavalry Brigade which was assigned to The Cavalry Division and moved to France in August 1914.

=== Early Actions ===
With The Cavalry Division, the regiment took part in a number of actions during the early war of movement: the Battle of Mons (23–24 August), the Battle of Le Cateau (26 August), the action at Néry (1 September), the Battle of the Marne (6–9 September) and the Battle of the Aisne (12–15 September).

=== 2nd Cavalry Division ===
The regiment was transferred with 4th Cavalry Brigade to the 2nd Cavalry Division on 14 October 1914 to bring it up to the standard three brigade strength. With the division, the regiment took part in First Battle of Ypres, notably the battle of Gheluvelt (29–31 October). On 11 November, the Household Cavalry Composite Regiment was broken up and its constituent squadrons rejoined their parent regiments; these had landed at Zeebrugge on 7 October 1914 with 7th Cavalry Brigade, 3rd Cavalry Division. The Queen's Own Oxfordshire Hussars, a Yeomanry regiment, replaced it in 4th Cavalry Brigade.

=== Household Battalion ===
From 1916 to 1918, an infantry battalion, the Household Battalion, was formed from the 1st Life Guards, 2nd Life Guards and Royal Horse Guards Reserve Regiments.

== World War II ==
By the outbreak of World War II, the 1st and 2nd Life Guards had been amalgamated as the Life Guards. In September 1939, the Life Guards and Royal Horse Guards formed the Household Cavalry Composite Regiment and the Household Cavalry Training Regiment.

=== 1st Household Cavalry Regiment ===
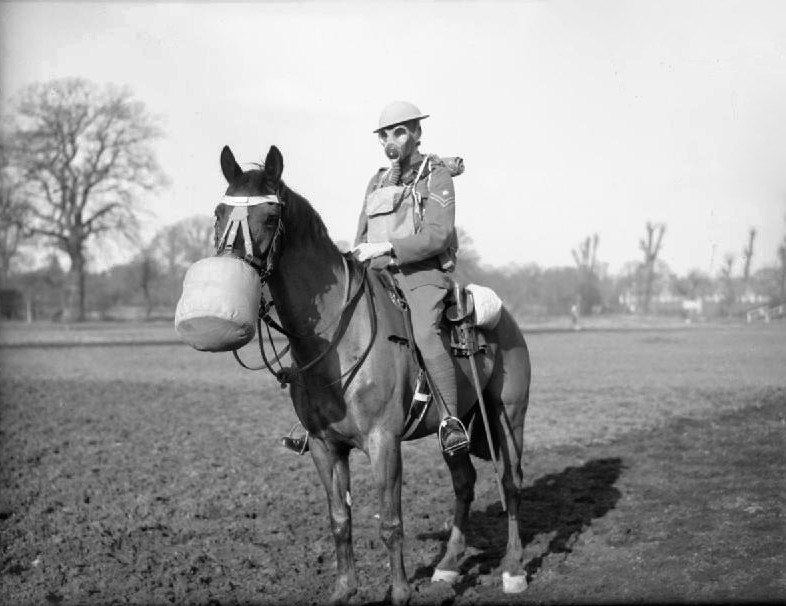
A mounted lance corporal of the Household Cavalry Regiment wearing a gas mask, Windsor, 1939

==== Mobilisation ====
The Blues were at Windsor when war was declared on 3 September 1939. That month, the Life Guards and Royal Horse Guards formed the Household Cavalry Composite Regiment and the Household Cavalry Training Regiment. King George VI was instinctively biased in the favour of the Household Cavalry expressing a wish to see both regiments involved in battle and doing ceremonial duties. From 30 September 1939 the king inspected the Composites and then each unit in turn. Remounts Depots were established to keep the regiments on horseback, but the Composite was short of horses. But it became clear from advice received from Bernard Montgomery that Remounts would soon have to be abandoned. The Household Cavalry Composite Regiment served with the 4th Cavalry Brigade and joined the 1st Cavalry Division when it was formed on 31 October 1939.

Charles Kavanagh had complained that the Household Cavalry Regiment used up "a large number of horses" and was "not getting as good officers as the others." Humphrey Wyndham, who was with Life Guards, told Churchill that his preference was for Household Cavalry to become tank and not machine guns. "Then The Life Guards and Blues would have led the way in the mechanization of the cavalry, instead of being made to follow it." As it was they mobilized their horses in 1939; four of the officers in the Blues at that time were Masters of Fox Hound. Wyndham went on: "The horse, after serving as a medium of mobility in war from the earliest times, was in process of supersession by the internal combustion engine across the valley."

==== Palestine, Iraq and North Africa ====
The Household Cavalry Composite Regiment departed the United Kingdom in February 1940, transited across France, and arrived in Palestine on 20 February 1940. It served as a garrison force under British Forces, Palestine and Trans-Jordan. A reserve regiment remained in London to do ceremonials, whilst training regiments took place at Windsor. It was overcrowded when Regimental HQ Life Guards and two squadrons made their way there from London. B Squadron found accommodation at the Royal Hotel, and C Squadron went to the Old Etonian Club at Combermere Barracks, Windsor. 100 Reservists were drafted from other regiments for a full complement.

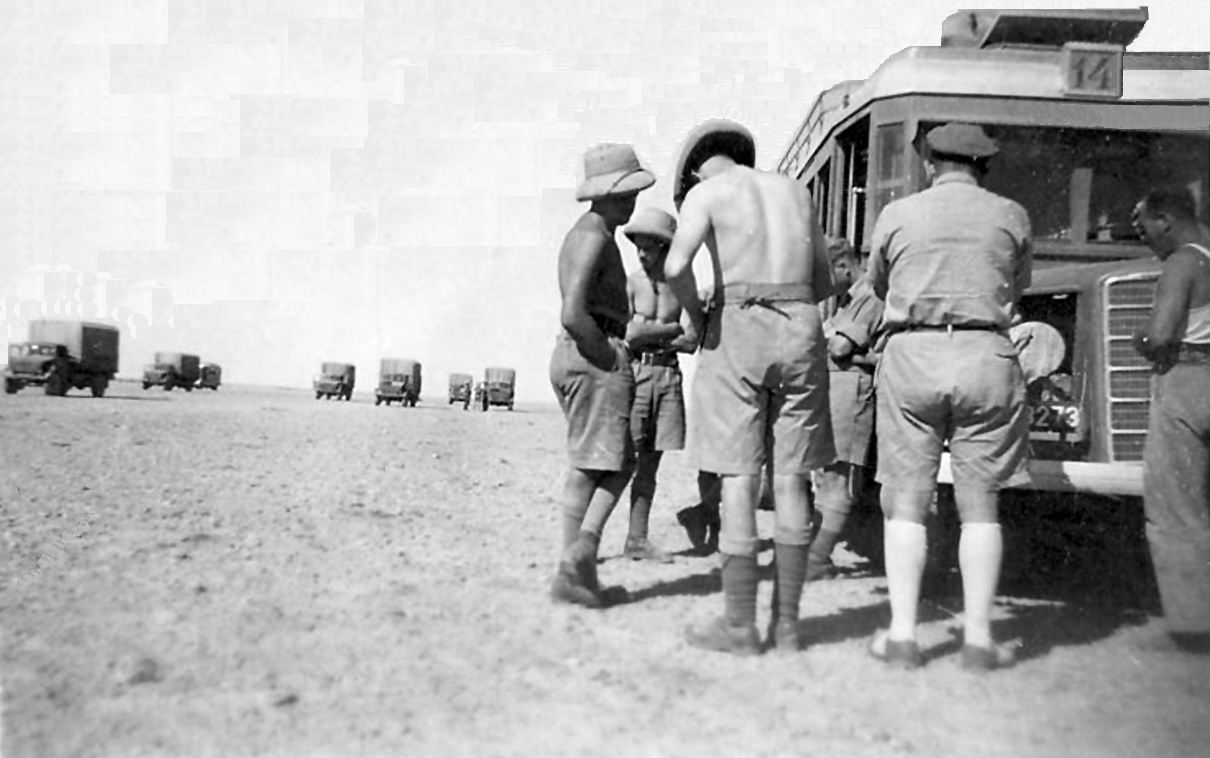
British trucks near Baghdad, 1943.

In November 1940 the Household Cavalry Composite Regiment became the 1st Household Cavalry Motor Battalion. The 1st Household Cavalry Motor Battalion arrived at Haifa on 22 February 1941 under a new commanding officer, Lieutenant-Colonel Reginald Heyworth. The final decision to become mechanized was not taken until later that month. In the Judean desert they were ordered to end their horse cavalry days: horses older than 15 years were put down. In March 1941, the 1st Household Cavalry Motor Battalion was redesignated as the 1st Household Cavalry Regiment.

In April 1941, the 4th Cavalry Brigade, together with a battalion of infantry from the Essex Regiment, a mechanised regiment from the Arab Legion and supporting artillery was organised as Habforce for operations in Iraq as part of the response to pro-Axis Rashid Ali who had seized power in Baghdad and was besieging RAF Habbaniya. On 9 May 1941, 1st Household Cavalry Regiment were ordered to prepare to move with 2-inch mortars, Hotchkiss machine guns and, later, Bren machine-guns (much as they had been armed in 1914): the operation across the desert by was one of the most illustrious in the earlier period of the war. There was a heatwave as they followed the oil pipeline to join Glubb Pasha's Arab Legion at the Rutba Oasis. The column covered 700 miles in six days, led by Household Cavalry officers, who were awarded several Military Crosses. C Squadron was stationed at Fallujah, to hold the Euphrates against any attack from Baghdad. The advance on the capital began on 27 May. Lieutenant-Colonel Andrew Ferguson, the commanding officer, took the main force north, while C Squadron circled south of the city. Faced by an Iraqi division, and flanked by another regiment, the British Regimental HQ was attacked, but repulsed the enemy. B Squadron had a sharp fight at Al-Khadimain, and there was a display of singular courage in the face of the enemy by Corporal of Horse Charles Maxted, who was awarded the Military Medal. But the Germans in Baghdad called a truce, and on 31 May, C Squadron was billeted in the city's railway station unopposed.

Following this, in July 1941, Habforce was placed under the command of the Australian I Corps and was involved in operations against the Vichy French in Syria, advancing from eastern Iraq near the Trans-Jordan border to capture Palmyra and secure the Haditha - Tripoli oil pipeline.

A flying column created from A Squadron, known as Mercol after its commander, Major Merry, was tasked with crossing the Iraqi desert in search of El Fawzi el Rashid, a leading Arab nationalist.

The operation to seize a notorious German agent, Fritz Grobba was carried out by B Squadron led by Major Eric Gooch. Gooch's unit occupied Mosul Airfield, taken from the Germans. It was thought Grobba was hiding at Kameschle in Vichy Syria but on 30 May, Grobba fled Baghdad.

Strafed by enemy planes, they moved into the hills above Palmyra, partly on foot. Palmyra fell on 3 July 1941. Lieutenant John Shaw and Lieutenant Valerian Wellesley of the Blues were awarded Military Crosses. On 15 July they attacked a ridge occupied by the Foreign Legion at Djerboua. On 15 July 1941 they were lauded by Winston Churchill, at a time during the war when there were few victories, for the capture of the oasis and declaration of surrender by the French regime. They quickly moved into Aleppo. The commanding officer left a report to:

"give further accounts to the public ... of Syrian fighting, marked as it was by so many picturesque episodes, such as the arrival of His Majesty's Life Guards and Royal Horse Guards, in armoured cars, across many hundreds of miles of desert, to surround and capture the oasis of Palmyra."

The last mounted expedition took place at the Plain of Esdraelon in October 1941; from their base at Tiberias on the Vichy-Syrian frontier they reported on "the last great mounted exercise ever to be undertaken by British cavalry in the Plain of Esdraelon, which has a nice Biblical sound and involved about two thousands horses."

The 1st Household Cavalry Regiment next saw action at the First Battle of El Alamein in July 1942 and the Second Battle of El Alamein in October 1942 before moving to Syria to patrol the Turko-Syrian border. The 1st Household Cavalry Regiment landed in Italy in April 1944 and then, after a break in the UK between October 1944 and March 1945, took part in the North West Europe Campaign.

The regiment was disbanded in 1945 and the personnel returned to their original units.

=== 2nd Household Cavalry Regiment ===
The Household Cavalry Training Regiment remained in Home Forces until September 1941 when it was redesignated as the 2nd Household Cavalry Regiment and joined the Guards Armoured Division. It acted as the divisional reconnaissance unit until 27 February 1943 when it was replaced by the 2nd Battalion, Welsh Guards.

In July 1943 it was assigned to the Second Army and in June 1944 it landed in Normandy as part of VIII Corps. Thereafter it served throughout the North West Europe Campaign until the end of the war with VIII and XXX Corps. On 19 June 1945, it rejoined the Guards Division (replacing 2nd Welsh Guards).

=== Household Cavalry Reserve Regiment ===
The Household Cavalry Reserve Regiment was formed in September 1939 and remained in the Home Forces until March 1941 when it was disbanded.

== See also ==
- British cavalry during the First World War

== Bibliography ==
- Becke, Archibald F. (1935). Order of Battle of Divisions Part 1–The Regular British Divisions. London: HMSO. OCLC 4405016.
- Bellis, Malcolm A. (1994). Regiments of the British Army 1939–1945 (Armour & Infantry). London: Military Press International. ISBN 0-85420-999-9.
- De Chair, Somerset (1944). The Golden Carpet. Faber & Faber.
- James, Brigadier E.A. (1978). British Regiments 1914–18. London: Samson Books Limited. ISBN 0-906304-03-2.
- Joslen, Lt-Col H.F. (1990) [1st. Pub. HMSO:1960]. Orders of Battle, Second World War, 1939–1945. London: London Stamp Exchange. ISBN 0-948130-03-2.
- Lyman, Robert (2006). Iraq 1941: The Battles for Basra, Habbaniya, Fallujah and Baghdad. Campaign. Oxford, New York: Osprey Publishing. pp. 96. ISBN 1-84176-991-6.
- Mead, Richard (2012). Cavalry General: The Life of General Sir Richard McCreery. Pen & Sword. ISBN 9781848844650.
- White-Spunner, Barney (2006). Horse Guards. London: Macmillan. ISBN 978-1405055741.
