= Freefolk =

Village in Hampshire, England

Coordinates: 51.2361°N 1.3061°W

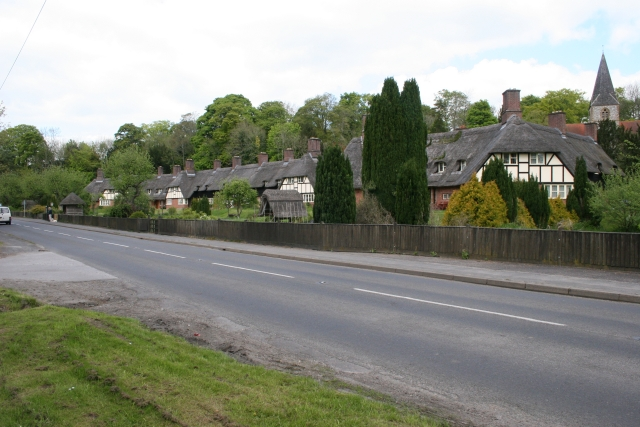

- Location within Hampshire
- OS grid reference: SU4853848772
- Civil parish: Laverstoke
- District: Basingstoke and Deane
- Shire county: Hampshire
- Region: South East
- Country: England
- Sovereign state: United Kingdom
- Post town: WHITCHURCH
- Postcode district: RG28
- Dialling code: 01256
- Police: Hampshire and Isle of Wight
- Fire: Hampshire and Isle of Wight
- Ambulance: South Central
- UK Parliament: North West Hampshire

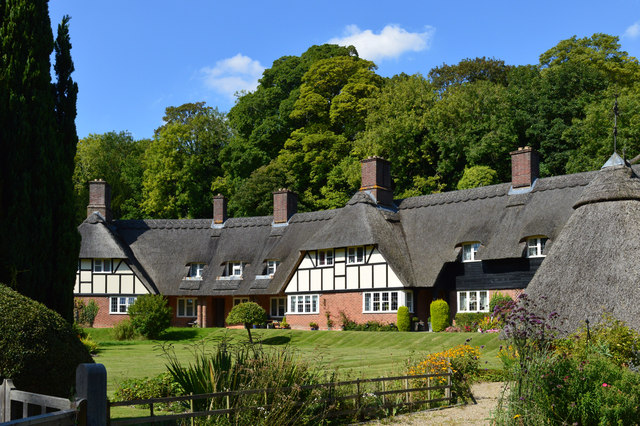
Manor Cottages, Freefolk, Hampshire (2015) by Oswald Bertram

Freefolk is a village in Hampshire, England. It lies to the west and almost directly alongside the village of Laverstoke; the two villages are separated by the River Test.

It is about 1.5 miles (2 km) east of Whitchurch and 1 mile (2 km) west of Overton on the B3400 road between Basingstoke and Andover.

In the village is an inn named the "Watership Down", known locally as "the jerry". Built in 1840, it was called the Freefolk Arms but was renamed in honour of local author Richard Adams and his book Watership Down, which took its name from the down about 5 miles (8 km) to the north of the village.

The village name was brought to many people's attention by the "Forever Freefolk" garden at the 2016 Chelsea Flower Show, sponsored by Brewin Dolphin and designed by Rosy Hardy of local nursery Hardy's Cottage Garden Plants. The garden highlighted the fragility of England's chalk streams, and won a silver medal.

== Governance ==
The village is part of the civil parish of Laverstoke and is part of the Overton, Laverstoke and Steventon ward of Basingstoke and Deane borough council. The borough council is a Non-metropolitan district of Hampshire County Council.

== See also ==
- St Nicholas' Church, Freefolk
