= 2nd Regiment of Life Guards =

British Army cavalry regiment

2nd Life Guards
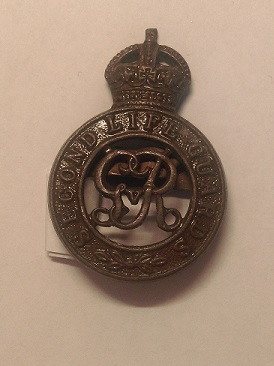
- Cap badge of the regiment (with royal cypher of George V)
- Active: 1788–1922
- Country: Kingdom of Great Britain (1788–1800); United Kingdom (1801–1922)
- Branch: Army
- Type: Household Cavalry
- Role: Cavalry

The 2nd Regiment of Life Guards was a cavalry regiment in the British Army, part of the Household Cavalry. It was formed in 1788 by the union of the 2nd Troop of Horse Guards and 2nd Troop of Horse Grenadier Guards. In 1922, it was amalgamated with the 1st Life Guards to form The Life Guards.

== History ==
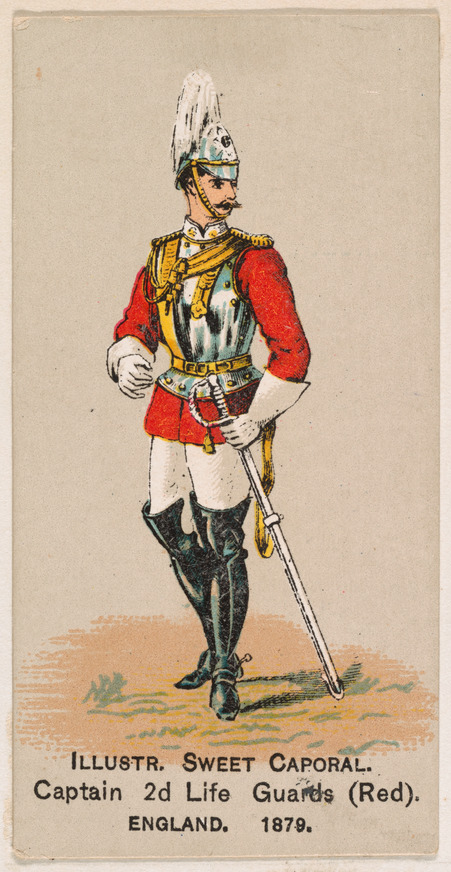
A captain of the regiment in 1879

The regiment was formed in 1788 by the union of the 2nd Troop of Horse Guards and 2nd Troop of Horse Grenadier Guards. It fought in the Peninsular War, under the command of Major-General Charles Barton, and at the Waterloo. In 1877, it was renamed 2nd Life Guards and contributed to the Household Cavalry Composite Regiment in the Anglo-Egyptian War, in the Second Boer War and in the First World War from August to November 1914. From 1916 to 1918, the Reserve Regiment contributed to the Household Battalion. In 1918, the regiment was converted to the 2nd Battalion, Guards Machine Gun Regiment. It was reconstituted in 1919 and was amalgamated with the 1st Life Guards in 1922 to form The Life Guards.

== Battle honours ==
The battle honours of the regiment were:

- Early Wars: Dettingen, Peninsula, Waterloo, Tel-el-Kebir, Egypt 1882, Relief of Kimberley, Paardeberg, South Africa 1899–1900
- The Great War: Mons, Le Cateau, Retreat from Mons, Marne 1914, Aisne 1914, Messines 1914, Armentières 1914, Ypres 1914 '15 '17, Langemarck 1914, Gheluvelt, Nonne Bosschen, St. Julien, Frezenberg, Somme 1916 '18, Albert 1916, Arras 1917 '18, Scarpe 1917, Broodseinde, Poelcappelle, Passchendaele, Bapaume 1918, Hindenburg Line, Épehy, St. Quentin Canal, Beaurevoir, Cambrai 1918, Selle, France and Flanders 1914–18

== Colonels-in-Chief ==
The Colonels-in-Chief of the regiment were:

- 1815–1830: King George IV
- 1831–1837: King William IV
- 1880–1910: King Edward VII
- 1910–1922: King George V

== Regimental Colonels ==
The Colonels of the regiment were:

- 1788–1797: Field Marshal The Rt Hon The Lord Amherst KB
- 1797–1843: General The Rt Hon. The Earl Cathcart KT PC
- 1843–1854: General The Most Hon. The Marquess of Londonderry KG GCB GCH PC
- 1854–1863: Field Marshal The Rt Hon. The Lord Seaton GCB GCMG GCH
- 1863: General The Rt Hon. The Earl Beauchamp DL
- 1863–1876: Field Marshal The Most Hon. The Marquess of Tweeddale KT GCB
- 1876–1890: General The Rt Hon. The Viscount Templetown GCB
- 1890–1900: General The Rt Hon. The Earl Howe GCVO CB
- 1900–1905: General The Rt Hon. The Lord Chelmsford GCB GCVO
- 1905–1907: Field Marshal The Rt Hon. The Lord Grenfell GCB GCMG
- 1907–1919: Lieutenant General The Rt Hon. The Earl of Dundonald KCB KCVO
- 1919–1922: Major General The Hon. Sir Cecil Edward Bingham GCVO KCMG CB

== See also ==
- Life Guards
- British cavalry during the First World War

== Sources ==
- White-Spunner, Barney (2006). Horse Guards. Macmillan. ISBN 978-1405055741.
