= Household Battalion =

The Household Battalion
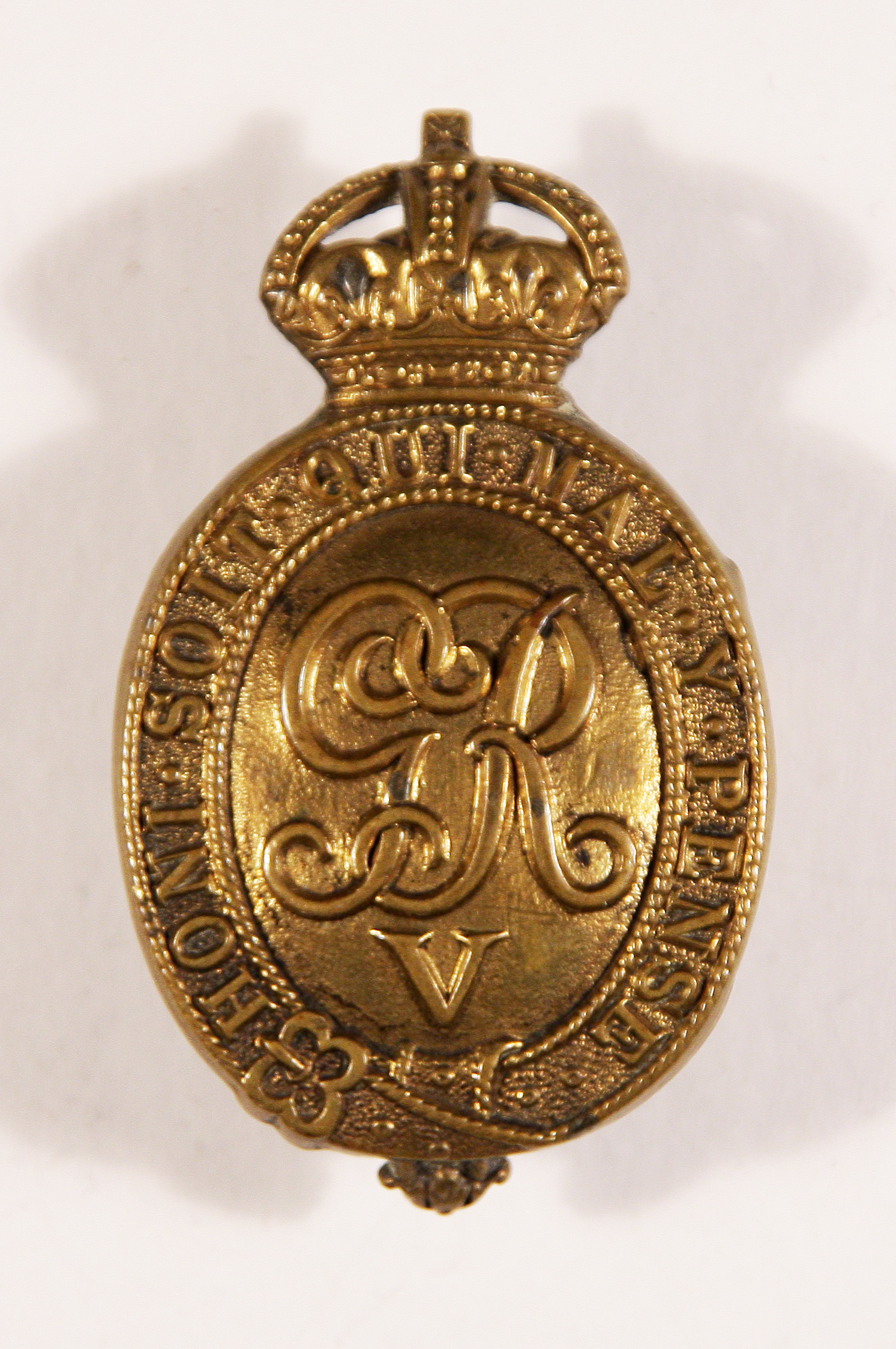
- Cap badge of the Household Battalion
- Active: 1916–1918
- Country: United Kingdom
- Branch: British Army
- Type: Infantry
- Size: 1 Battalion
- Garrison/HQ: Knightsbridge Barracks

The Household Battalion was an infantry battalion of the British army during the Great War. It was formed in September 1916 from the reserves of the Household Cavalry regiments (the 1st Life Guards, 2nd Life Guards and the Royal Horse Guards) to help fill the ever-increasing demands for infantry on the Western Front. Considerable effort was expended in the conversion of cavalrymen into infantry trained and equipped for trench warfare. The battalion spent its entire existence on the Western Front as part of the 4th Infantry Division, arriving as the Battle of the Somme was ending in early December 1916. It fought in the Battle of Arras and later at Third Ypres, suffering severely in the assault on Poelcappelle. Its last major engagement was the defence of Bourlon Ridge during the Battle of Cambrai in late 1917. By this time, it had become apparent that there were insufficient reserves to support all the Household Cavalry regiments that had been converted to infantry (in particular, the Guards Machine Gun Regiments) and it was disbanded as part of a general reorganization in February 1918.

Men of the battalion were paid cavalry rates of pay (a little more than infantry) and wore cavalry uniforms while on leave. The battalion was commanded by Lieutenant-Colonel Wyndham Portal throughout the 14 months of its existence.

== Colours and battle honours ==
The battalion did not receive any Colours during its short existence, but a King's Colour was made in 1919 and laid up in Holy Trinity Garrison Church, Windsor, in 1920. Colonel Portal decided that the battle honours to which the Household Battalion was entitled should be awarded jointly to the 1st Life Guards, 2nd Life Guards and the Royal Horse Guards, so the Household Battalion's colour carries no battle honours.
