= Portals (paper makers) =

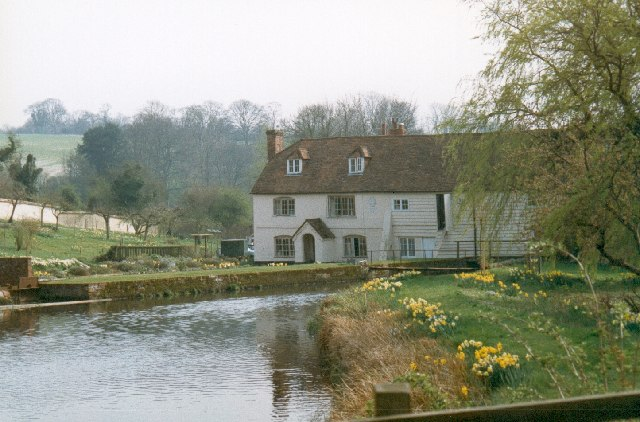
Bere Mill, 1996

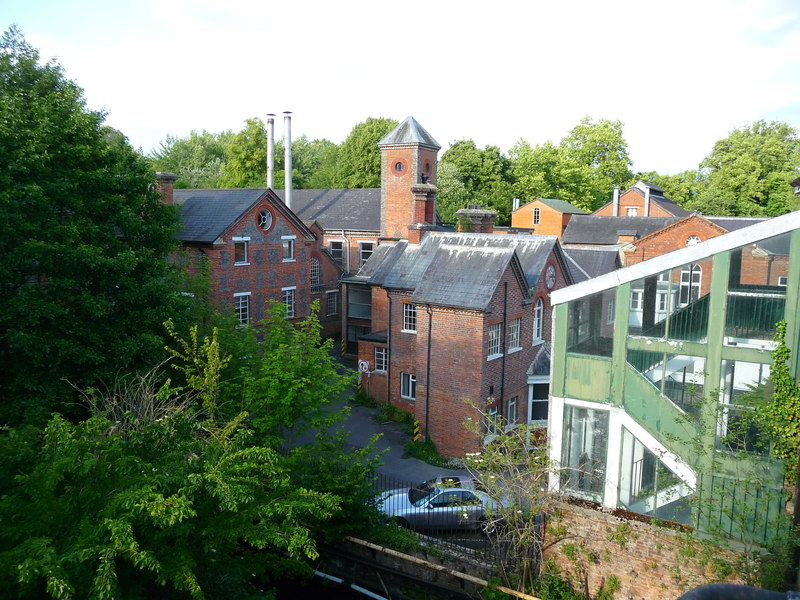
Laverstoke Mill, 2011

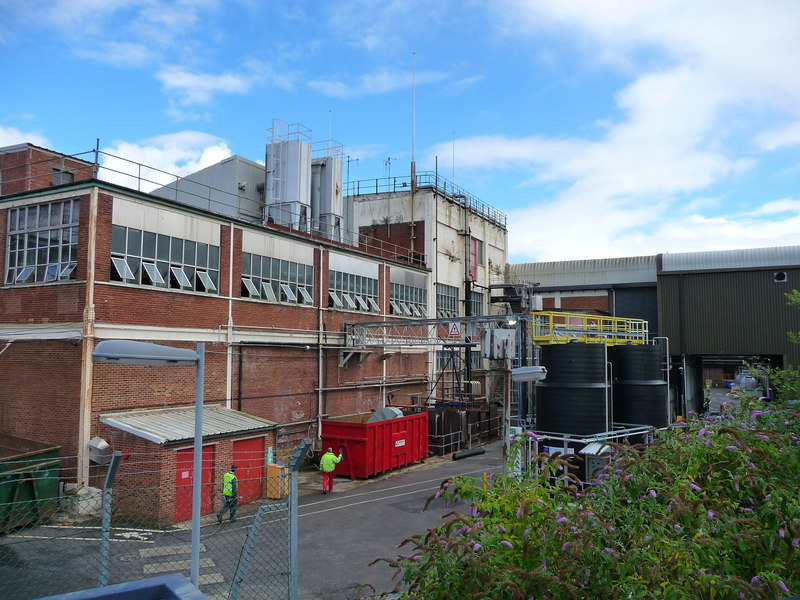
Overton Mill, 2010

Portals is a British papermaking company that has had two distinct existences as an independent business, from 1711 to 1995, and from 2018 onwards. It has been variously known as Portals Limited, Portals Paper Limited, and Portals De La Rue Limited, and currently as Portals International Limited. The present company, based at Bathford, Somerset, specialises in paper for banknotes and other security applications such as passports.

Between 1711 and 1995, the company was owned by the Portal family. The family went on to become major landowners, and were involved in the development of the London and South Western Railway. In 1901 the Portal baronetcy was created for the head of the family.

== History ==
The business was founded in 1711 by Henri de Portal (1690–1747), a Huguenot refugee from Poitiers in France, who had come to England as a child with his father. Before the arrival of the Huguenot immigrants, most of Britain's paper requirements had been imported, but in 1686 a paper mill was established at South Stoneham using Huguenot expertise, and Henri found employment there. Whilst there, he made the acquaintance of William Heathcote, who assisted him in the acquisition, in 1710, of the lease of Bere Mill, near Whitchurch in Hampshire. In 1711, he founded the Portal papermaking business there, and became a naturalised British subject, taking the name Henry.

The papermaking business was successful, and in 1718 Henry leased the nearby Laverstoke Mill in order to expand the business. Laverstoke Mill would be the headquarters of the business for the next 200 years and more. In the 1720s the Bank of England was looking for a supply of improved paper for its banknotes; it so happened that William Heathcote's uncle, Gilbert Heathcote, was the Governor of the Bank of England during this period, and Henry Portal obtained the contract to supply this paper.

In 1860, Portals won the contract to produce the paper for the Indian rupee, and in 1880 for the first postal orders.

Portals opened Overton Mill, near Laverstoke, in 1922. Paper making ceased at Laverstoke Mill in 1963, having transferred to the nearby and more modern Overton Mill. In 1972, Portals acquired Bathford Mill, near Bath in Somerset, which had been producing paper since 1809. In 1995, Portals were themselves acquired by De La Rue, the banknote printers, and the name ceased to be used. In 2018, De La Rue divested its papermaking activities, and the name Portals was again used for the newly independent company, which produced paper at its sites at Overton Mill and Bathford Mill. In July 2022, it was announced that Overton Mill would shut due to lack of profitability.
