= Guards Machine Gun Regiment =

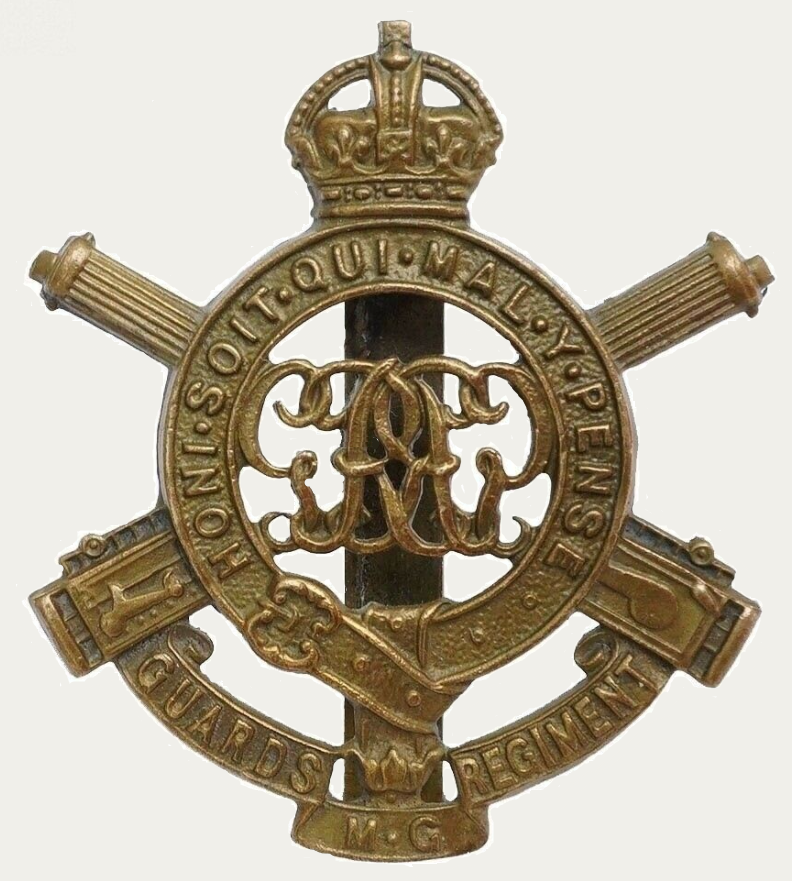
- Regimental cap badge from May 1918
- Active: 1918–1920
- Country: United Kingdom
- Branch: British Army
- Type: Foot Guards
- Role: Machine Gunner
- Size: 5 Battalions
- March: Quick – Machine Gun Guards; Slow – The Soldier's Chorus

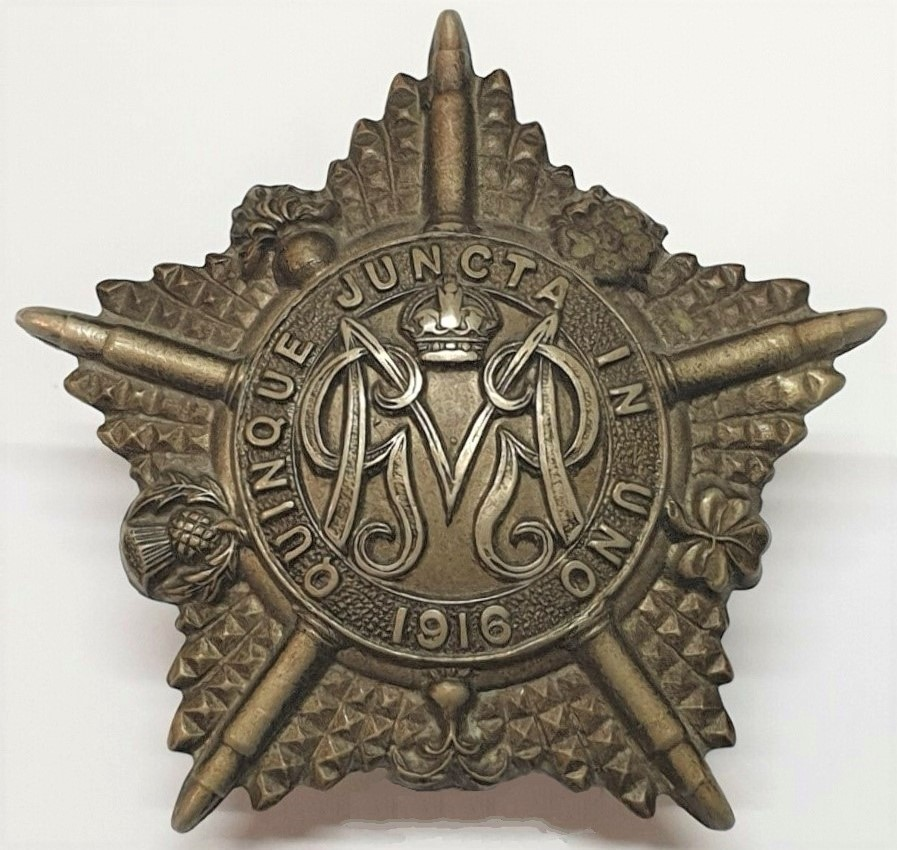
Machine Gun Guards, other ranks cap badge, 1917–18

The Guards Machine Gun Regiment was a regiment of the British Army, formed for service in the First World War.

When the Guards Division was formed in August 1915, it included three machine gun companies, with a fourth added in March 1917. In April 1917, the four companies were grouped together as a single battalion named the Machine Gun Guards, before being re-designated by Royal Warrant in May 1918 as the Guards Machine Gun Regiment. In June, the regiment was reorganised into battalions.

The regiment does not have any battle honours of its own as these were awarded to the parent units.

== Battalions ==
The battalions of the regiment were:

- 1st (Life Guards) Battalion – conversion of 1st Life Guards
- 2nd (Life Guards) Battalion – conversion of 2nd Life Guards
- 3rd (Royal Horse Guards) Battalion – conversion of Royal Horse Guards ("The Blues")
- 4th (Foot Guards) Battalion – re-designation of the existing Machine Gun Guards battalion
- 5th (Reserve) Battalion – re-designation of Guards Machine Gun Training Centre

The first three battalions served with the 1st Army of the British Expeditionary Force, while the 4th Battalion remained with the Guards Division. In November 1918, after the end of the war, the three Household Cavalry battalions resumed their old role as cavalry, with the 4th Battalion disbanded in February 1919.

The regimental establishment of HQ and four machine gun companies was retained until 1920, and the regiment took part in the Trooping the Colour ceremony in Hyde Park, London to mark the King's Official Birthday in June 1919 alongside the other regiments of foot guards.

On 26 February 1920 an army order was issued announcing that the regiment was to be immediately disbanded and the 1918 royal warrant cancelled.

== See also ==
- Machine Gun Corps
