= 1st Regiment of Life Guards =

British Army cavalry regiment

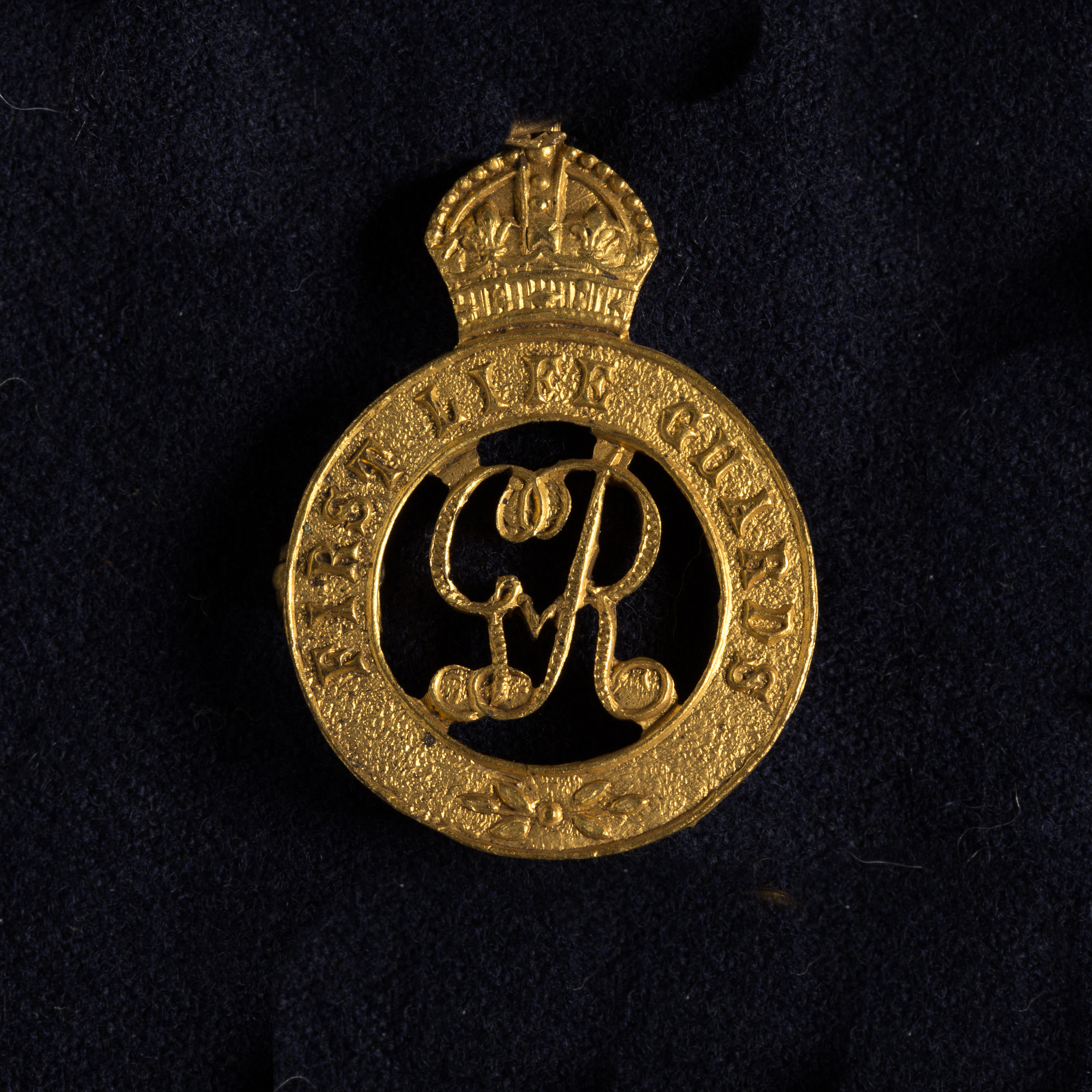
- Cap badge of the regiment
- Active: 1788–1922
- Country: Great Britain (1788–1800); United Kingdom (1801–1922)
- Branch: British Army
- Type: Household Cavalry
- Role: Cavalry

The 1st Regiment of Life Guards was a cavalry regiment in the British Army, part of the Household Cavalry. It was formed in 1788 by the union of the 1st Troop of Horse Guards and 1st Troop of Horse Grenadier Guards. In 1922, it was amalgamated with the 2nd Life Guards to form the Life Guards.

== History ==
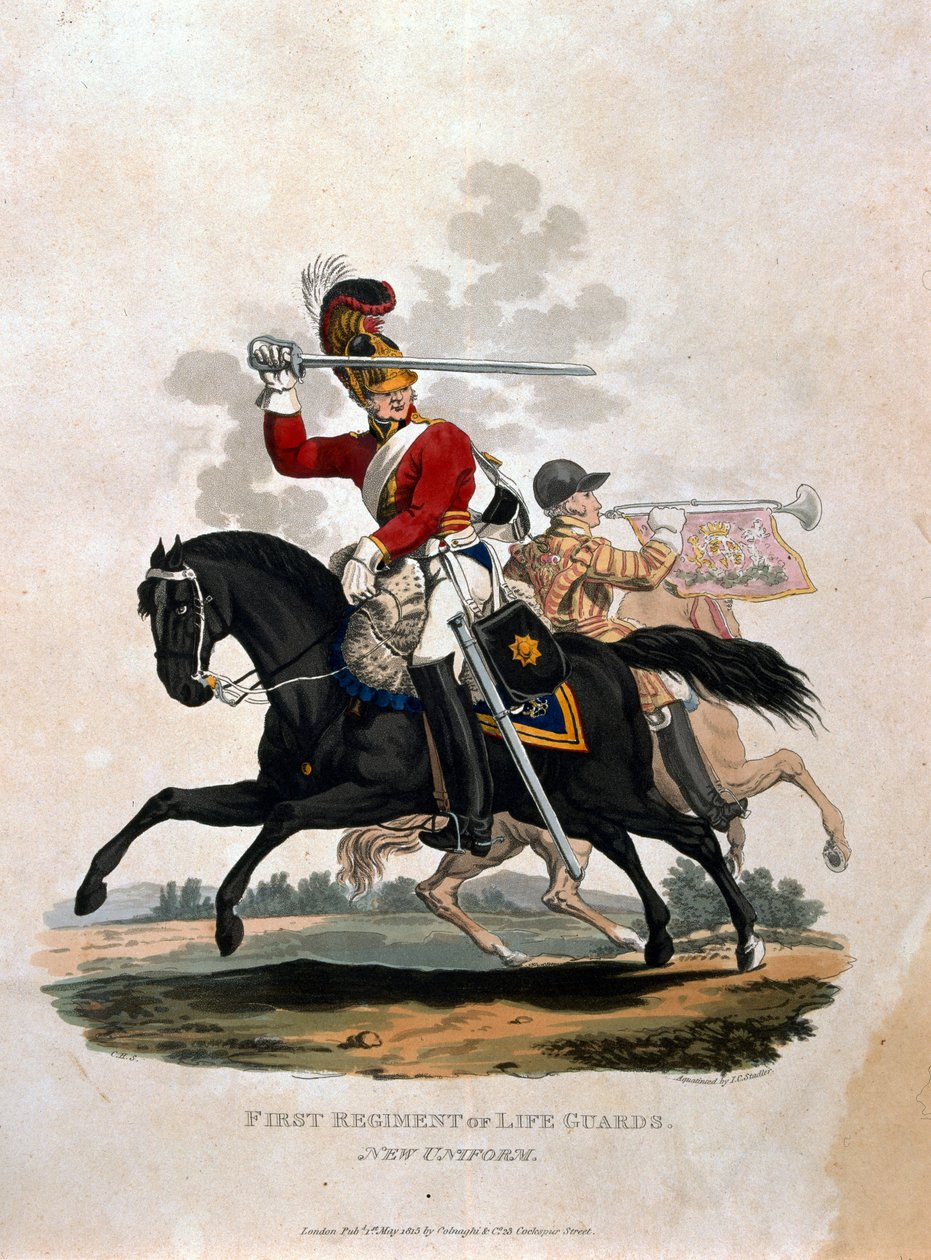
1815 engraving of a regimental private and trumpeter

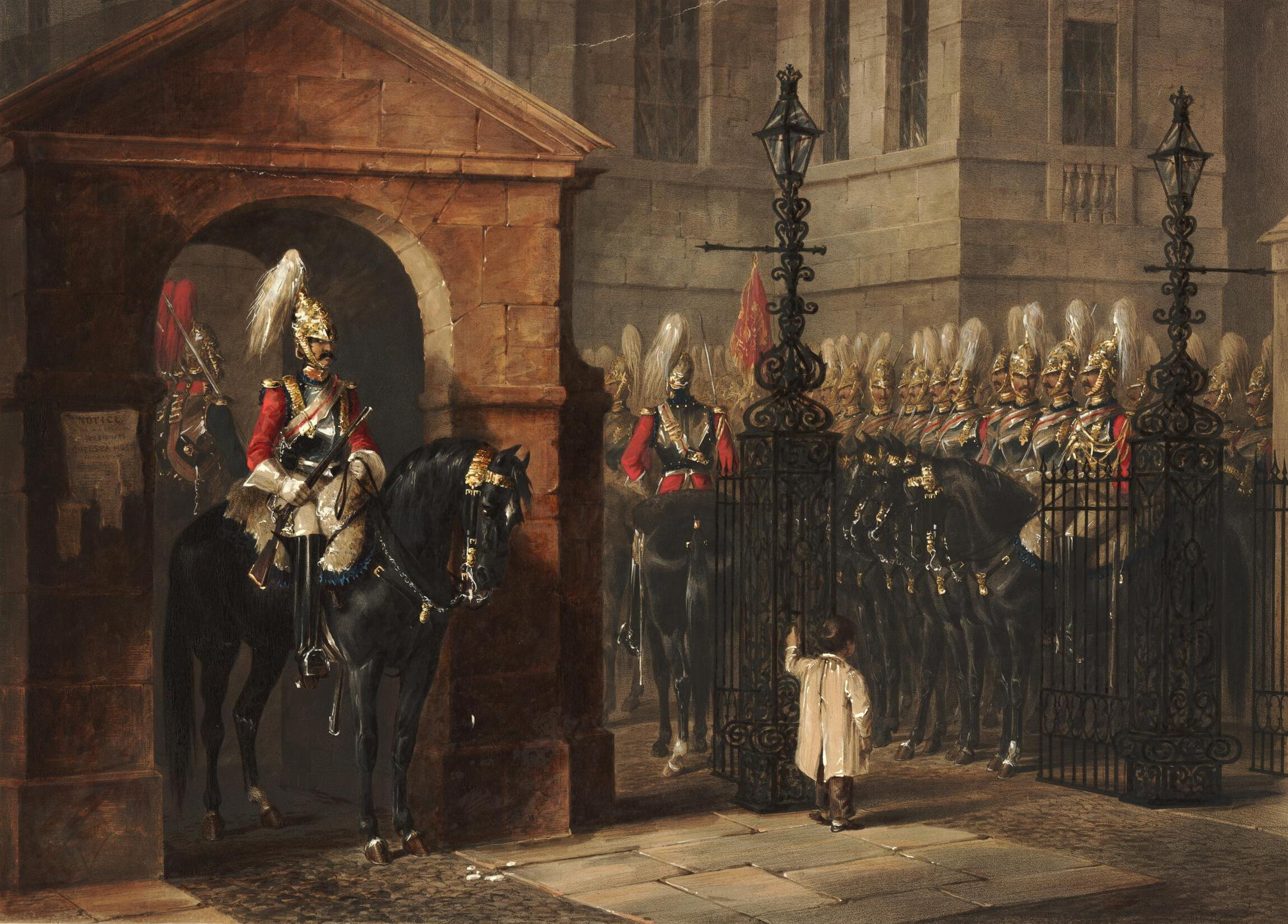
1843 painting of the regiment on duty at Horse Guards

The regiment was formed in 1788 by the union of the 1st Troop of Horse Guards and 1st Troop of Horse Grenadier Guards. It fought in the Peninsular War and at the Waterloo. In 1877, it was renamed 1st Life Guards and contributed to the Household Cavalry Composite Regiment in the Anglo-Egyptian War, in the Second Boer War and in the First World War from August to November 1914. From 1916 to 1918, the Reserve Regiment contributed to the Household Battalion. In 1918, the regiment was converted to the 1st Battalion, Guards Machine Gun Regiment. It was reconstituted in 1919 and was amalgamated with the 2nd Life Guards in 1922 to form The Life Guards.

== Battle honours ==
The battle honours of the regiment were:

- Early Wars: Dettingen, Peninsula, Waterloo, Tel-el-Kebir, Egypt 1882, Relief of Kimberley, Paardeberg, South Africa 1899–1900
- The Great War: Mons, Le Cateau, Retreat from Mons, Marne 1914, Aisne 1914, Messines 1914, Armentières 1914, Ypres 1914 '15 '17, Langemarck 1914, Gheluvelt, Nonne Bosschen, St. Julien, Frezenberg, Somme 1916, Albert 1916, Arras 1917 '18, Scarpe 1917 '18, Broodseinde, Poelcappelle, Passchendaele, Hindenburg Line, Cambrai 1918, France and Flanders 1914–18

== Colonels-in-Chief ==
The Colonels-in-Chief of the regiment were:

- 1815–1830: King George IV
- 1831–1837: King William IV
- 1880–1910: King Edward VII
- 1910–1922: King George V

== Regimental colonels ==
The colonels of the regiment were:

- 1788–1789: General The Most Hon. The Marquess of Lothian KT
- 1789–1792: General The Rt Hon. The Lord Dover KB PC
- 1792–1829: General The Rt Hon. The Earl of Harrington GCH PC
- 1829–1865: Field Marshal The Rt Hon. The Viscount Combermere GCB GCH KSI PC
- 1865–1888: Field Marshal The Rt Hon. The Earl of Lucan GCB
- 1888–1902: Field Marshal Prince Edward of Saxe-Weimar KP GCB GCH GCVO
- 1902–1907: Lieutenant General The Rt Hon. The Lord de Ros KP KCVO DL
- 1907–1920: Field Marshal The Rt Hon. The Lord Grenfell GCB GCMG
- 1920–1922: Field Marshal The Rt Hon. The Viscount Allenby GCB GCMG GCVO KStJ

== See also ==
- British cavalry during the First World War
- Life Guards

== Sources ==
- White-Spunner, Barney (2006). Horse Guards. Macmillan. ISBN 978-1405055741.
