= Laverstoke =

Village in Hampshire, England

Coordinates: 51.2340°N 1.2973°W

- Location within Hampshire
- Population: 415 (2011 Census including Freefolk)
- OS grid reference: SU4916148543
- District: Basingstoke and Deane
- Shire county: Hampshire
- Region: South East
- Country: England
- Sovereign state: United Kingdom
- Post town: Whitchurch
- Postcode district: RG28
- Police: Hampshire and Isle of Wight
- Fire: Hampshire and Isle of Wight
- Ambulance: South Central
- UK Parliament: North West Hampshire

Laverstoke (/ˈlævərstoʊk/ LAV-ər-stohk) is a village in north-west Hampshire, England. On the other side of the River Test there is the settlement at Freefolk which is included in the Laverstock census return.

In the early 18th century, Laverstoke Mill was purchased by the Portals, a family of Huguenot immigrants from Languedoc who were establishing a successful paper-making business. Henry de Portal was naturalised in 1711 and had the mill rebuilt in 1719. In 1724 he won the contract to make Bank of England notes, and pioneered the use of the watermark in paper currency.

Henry Portal's son Joseph went on to become High Sheriff of Hampshire and purchased the Laverstoke estate adjoining the mill. Following generations prospered further, becoming major land owners. By the 1790s they also owned the Manor at Freefolk Priors and Ashe Park House.

Jane Austen and her family were acquainted with the Portals, and two of her brother Edward's sons went on to marry members of the Portal family.

In 1796 the Portals had the old Laverstoke House demolished and a new house erected in neo-classical style by John Bonomi. It is this house that still stands today (although no longer owned by the Portals and not open to the public).

The Bombay Sapphire gin distillery has been located in the old paper mill since late 2014.

== Literature ==
In Richard Adams' novel Watership Down, the punt on which the rabbits escape from the Efrafans was boarded on the River Test at Laverstoke.

== See also ==
- St Mary's Church, Laverstoke
