= Effingham =

Effingham may refer to:

== Geography ==
Europe

- Effingham, Surrey, England
- Effingham Hundred, a hundred in Surrey that includes the village of Effingham
- Effingham Junction railway station, a station near the village

North America

- Effingham, Ontario, Canada
- Effingham, Illinois, US
- Effingham, Kansas, US
- Effingham, New Hampshire, US
- Effingham, South Carolina, US
- Effingham County, Georgia, US
- Effingham County, Illinois, US

== Ships ==
- HMS Effingham (D98), a Hawkins class heavy cruiser

== Other uses ==
- Effingham (Aden, Virginia), a historic home and national historic district

== See also ==
- Earl of Effingham
- "Effington", a song by Ben Folds from his 2008 album Way to Normal mistakenly named for the Illinois town
- Manci Howard, Lady Howard of Effingham
