= Francis Howard, 5th Baron Howard of Effingham =

English colonial administrator (1643–1695)

The Right Honourable The Lord Howard of Effingham
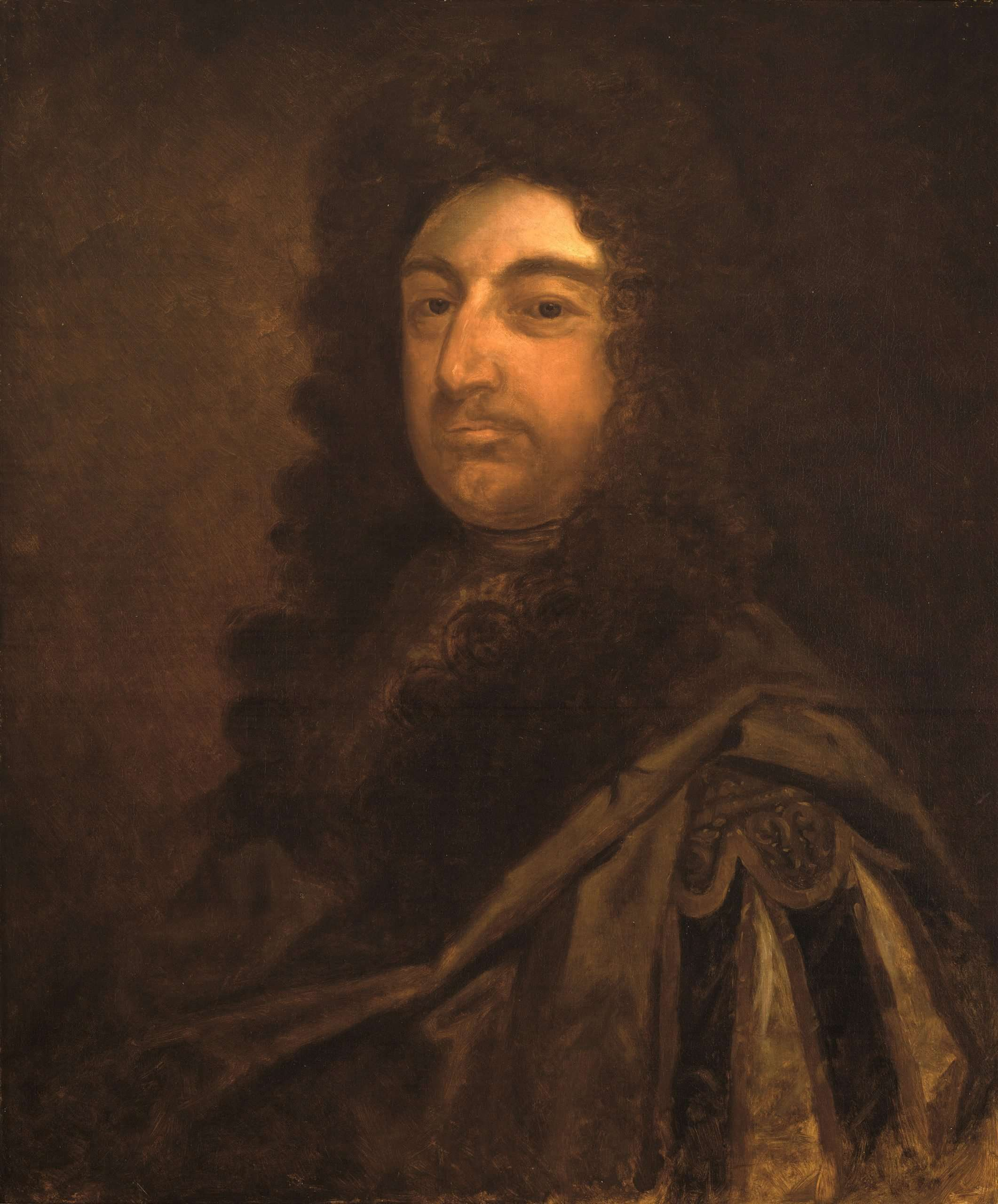
- 1877 portrait

Crown Governor of Virginia
- In office 1683–1692
- Monarchs: Charles II; James II; William III
- Preceded by: Baron Colepeper
- Succeeded by: Sir Edmund Andros

Personal details
- Born: 17 September 1643
- Died: 30 March 1694/95

Francis Howard, 5th Baron Howard of Effingham (c. 1643 – 30 March 1695) was an English colonial administrator who served as the governor of Virginia from 1683 to 1692. A member of the Howard family, he was a descendant of William Howard, 1st Baron Howard of Effingham.

== Family ==
He was the son of Sir Charles Howard and Frances Courthope. Francis Howard's paternal grandfather was the first cousin of both Charles Howard, 2nd Earl of Nottingham and Charles Howard, 3rd Earl of Nottingham. His maternal grandfather was Sir George Courthope of Whiligh, Sussex. Francis was baptised on 17 September 1643 in Great Bookham near Effingham in Surrey. On 8 July 1673, he married Philadelphia Pelham, daughter of Thomas Pelham, 2nd Baronet Pelham of Laughton and half-aunt of Thomas Pelham, eventual 1st Baron Pelham of Laughton. Francis and Philadelphia were the parents of Thomas Howard, 6th Baron Howard of Effingham and Francis Howard, 1st Earl of Effingham as well as another son and three daughters.

In 1681, Howard's cousin, the 3rd Earl of Nottingham, died and did not leave a male heir; nor did his two half-brothers. The earldom was declared extinct, but the title of Baron Howard of Effingham was passed on to Francis Howard.

== Virginia ==
Lord Howard was appointed Governor of Virginia in 1683. His family relocated there in February 1684, and Howard lived primarily at Rosegill plantation in Middlesex County. Howard commenced his duties as Governor on 16 April 1684. (The previous governor, Thomas Colepeper, 2nd Baron Colepeper, had departed suddenly in 1683. He was replaced by acting Governor Nicholas Spencer, Culpepper's cousin, agent, and president of the council, until Lord Howard's arrival nine months later.)

On 23 June 1684, Lord Howard sailed from Virginia for Albany, New York with his daughter, Philadelphia, where he and New York Governor Thomas Dongan brokered a July peace treaty with members of the Iroquois Confederacy. The treaty succeeded in ending a series of raids by the westernmost Seneca nation, whose warriors had traveled south to the frontier of Virginia. Although the Iroquois admitted to breaking the Covenant Chain, Howard and Dongan refrained from demanding reparations in hopes that they would continue attacks against the British rivals in New France. While in New York, Howard and his daughter stayed at Dongan's house and spent much of their time socialising. Howard was impressed by the lifestyle of New York, as compared to Virginia, and urged his wife to bring good silver from England. Lady Howard arrived in Virginia, but died the next year on 13 August 1685 at age 31. Their daughter, Margaret Frances, died while accompanying Lady Howard's body, being transported for return to England.

In 1687, Howard again travelled to New York to negotiate with the Iroquois, with a stop in Philadelphia on the way. Despite his negotiation efforts, Howard was unpopular among Virginians. He ordered that no one in the colony could use a printing press for any reason and tried to gain the power to overturn laws and levy taxes. Land grants could only be passed if Lord Howard was paid a fee. He created a court of equity and named himself a petty Lord Chancellor. In 1687, he expelled Colonel Philip Ludwell from the Virginia Council, calling him "an abettor in fomenting disputes over which the Assembly was so obstinate." The expulsion backfired, however, when Ludwell's resultant popularity led to a meeting with King William. A successful meeting with the king led to Ludwell's council seat being restored on 7 May 1691.

== Late life ==
Howard left Virginia for England on 20 October 1688. He lived mostly in Little Chelsea in Kensington, then Middlesex. He was allowed to remain governor of Virginia from afar at half the salary. Nathaniel Bacon Sr., who had administered the colony during Howard's time in New York in 1684, did so again while Howard was in England until Howard's deputy, Francis Nicholson, arrived on 16 May 1690. Howard remarried on 20 January 1690 to Susan Felton, daughter of Sir Henry Felton, Baronet, and widow of Philip Harbord. His funeral took place at St Giles in the Fields.

He had issue:

- Thomas Howard, 6th Baron Howard of Effingham, married Mary Wentworth, died without male issue
- Francis Howard, 1st Earl of Effingham.

Government offices
Preceded by Lord Colepeper	Colonial Governor of Virginia; 1683–1692	Succeeded by Edmund Andros
Peerage of England
Preceded by Charles Howard	Baron Howard of Effingham; 1681–1695	Succeeded by Thomas Howard
