= Esmeralda's Barn =

Nightclub in London, England, closed 1963

Coordinates: 51.5020°N 0.1563°W

Esmeralda's Barn, with its sign based on a roulette wheel

Esmeralda's Barn was a nightclub in Wilton Place, Knightsbridge, London, that was owned by the Kray twins from 1960 until its closure in 1963. The Krays used the club as a way of expanding their criminal activities into London's West End.

== 1950s ==
Esmeralda's Barn was conceived, designed (with murals by Pietro Annigoni) and owned by Mrs. Esme Noel Smith, and opened in February 1955 as a members theatre club. Tragically Mrs. Noel Smith (née Gullan) died a few weeks later having been overcome by gas at home. Afterwards it became a conventional nightclub run by Stefan de Faye. After the Betting and Gaming Act 1960 legalised gambling in the United Kingdom from 1961, de Faye turned Esmeralda's Barn into a gambling club. According to John Pearson, the Act, which was intended to drive criminals out of gambling, instead proved a boon to them as it enabled them to expand their empires legally.

== Acquired by the Krays ==
The Kray twins were London gangsters Ronnie and Reggie Kray. They acquired Esmeralda's Barn as a result of their attempt to extort landlord Peter Rachman although the exact nature of Rachman's interest in the club, if any, is unclear. Ronnie Kray had become aware of the wealth that Rachman was accumulating through his property empire and wanted a share of it. With his associates he visited Rachman in Soho and succeeded in extracting a cheque from Rachman. The cheque bounced and when Ronnie tried to collect the money Rachman was not to be found. Rachman knew that if he started to pay the Krays for protection they would continue to milk him indefinitely, so he needed to buy them off permanently. He therefore arranged for the Krays, through one of their front men Leslie Payne (whom Ronnie later tried to have killed), to buy Esmeralda's Barn from Stefan de Faye for the sum of £1,000.

Charlie Kray, however, the older brother of the twins, later told a different version of events in which he played a key role in negotiating the purchase from the owners for the sum of £2,000 and the sale was introduced by a Commander Diamond without any involvement by Rachman.

== Management by the Krays ==
The club became a lucrative venture for the twins and enabled Reggie to play the part of the celebrity gangster, as he had always aspired to be like his filmstar hero George Raft. Regular visitors included the artists Francis Bacon and Lucian Freud. The club also became a useful front for the Krays' criminal activities, including the prostitution of young boys whom they used to entrap blackmail targets.

If customers sometimes got carried away and accumulated large debts, that was not necessarily a bad thing as it put them in the power of the Krays. One of their associates, David Litvinoff, accumulated debts of £3,000, which Ronnie Kray agreed to waive in return for what was left of the lease on Litvinoff's flat at Ashburn Gardens, near the Gloucester Road in Kensington and taking over Litvinoff's lover Bobby Buckley, who became a croupier at the club. Litvinoff continued to live in the property as part of the deal.

Ronnie was able to choose the waiters and croupiers to suit his own preferences for attractive young men, and, according to John Pearson, the Barn became the centre of Ronnie's own "private vice ring", which included private sex shows at Ashburn Gardens.

Although the Krays made a lot of money from the club they could never resist extending credit to their criminal friends, who ran up large debts, cancelling other debts on a whim and dipping into the club's money whenever they wanted cash. Eventually the manager, Laurie O'Leary, offered the twins £1,000 per week to stay away from the club. They refused.

== Effingham ==
Leslie Payne came up with the idea of adding the dissolute Lord Effingham to the new board of directors in return for a stipend of £10 per week. Effingham was of distinguished lineage, being descended from Howard of Effingham who helped to defeat the Spanish Armada in 1588, but always short of cash. The Krays wanted the social status they thought an Earl on the board would bring. They either did not know or more likely did not care about his poor reputation and past criminal convictions, bankruptcy, bounced cheques, assaults, a dropped charge of manslaughter and the imprisonment of an ex-wife in Holloway as a threat to the British state. Effingham attended a couple of times each week and also mixed with guests at the Krays' Kentucky Club. The Krays referred to him as "Effing Effingham".

== Cellar Club ==
Under the gambling club was the Cellar Club, run by Ginette, which was a lesbian club open to people of all sexual orientations.

== Staff ==
The resident singer was Cy Grant. Other musicians who regularly played there included Noel Harrison and Lance Percival.

William Ives, a former boxer and, before his death in 2017, one of the richest men in Britain, worked as a doorman at the club during the Kray era.

== Closure ==
By 1963, the Krays' business interests in the West End had grown significantly and were becoming difficult to control. Esmeralda's Barn was closed at the end of that year.

== Today ==
The site is now home to The Berkeley, a five-star hotel.
