= Margaret Howard, Countess of Nottingham =

British noble

The Right Honourable The Countess of Nottingham
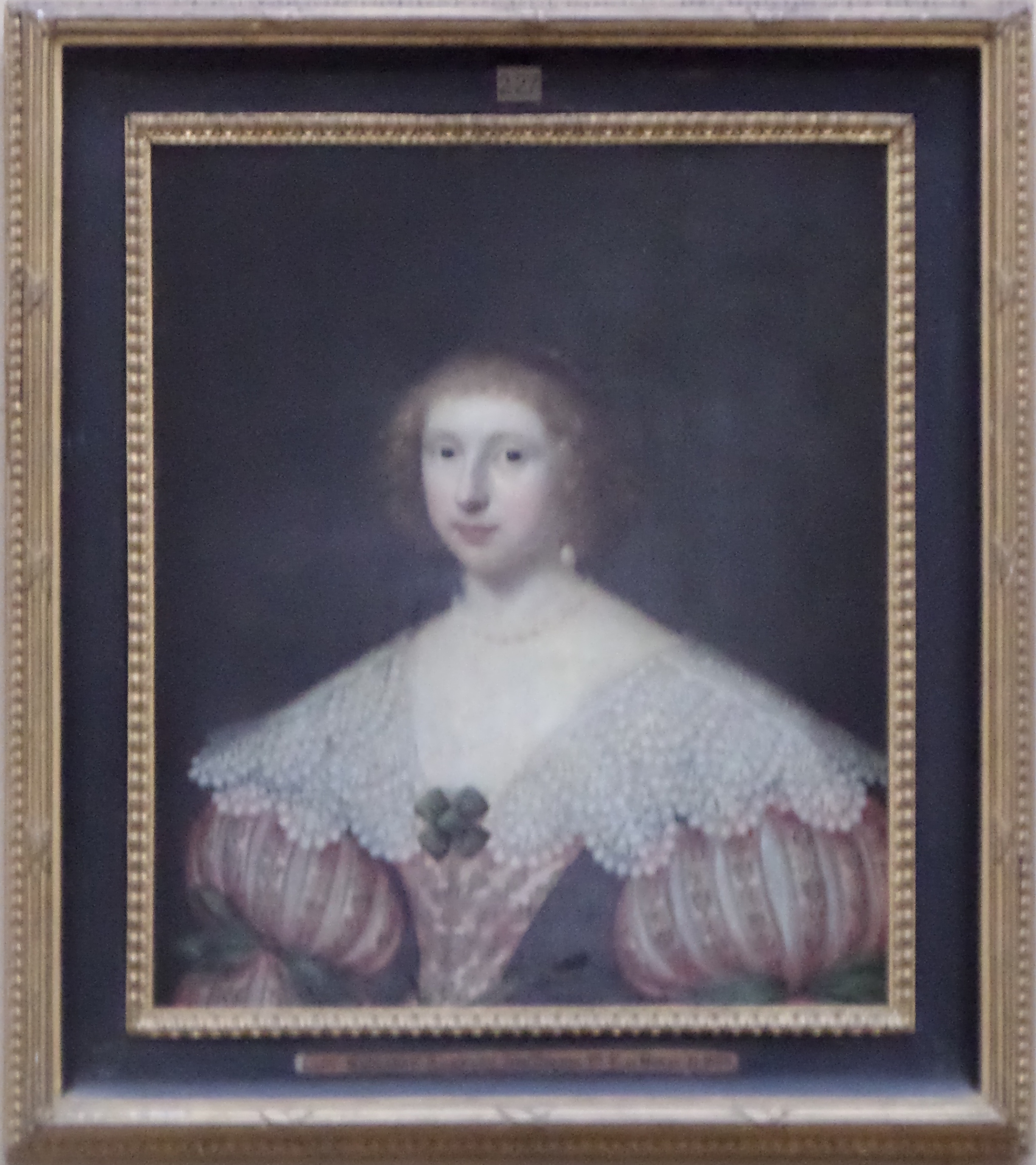
- Margaret Howard, Countess of Nottingham, by Cornelius Johnson, (Dunrobin Castle)
- Born: c. 1591
- Died: 4 August 1639 (aged 47–48)
- Spouse: Charles Howard, 1st Earl of Nottingham (m. 1603)
- Issue: Charles Howard, 3rd Earl of Nottingham; Anne Howard
- Father: James Stewart, 2nd Earl of Moray
- Mother: Elizabeth Stuart, 2nd Countess of Moray

Margaret Stuart (or Stewart) (c. 1591 – 4 August 1639), Scottish aristocrat and courtier in England. She served as lady-in-waiting to the queen consort of England, Anne of Denmark. She was the daughter of James Stewart, 2nd Earl of Moray, and Elizabeth Stuart, 2nd Countess of Moray. The sailor and patron of Ben Jonson, Sir Frances Stuart was her brother.

== Unions ==
Margaret Stewart was probably the sister of the Earl of Moray who joined the household of Anne of Denmark in September 1602. She may have been the subject of marriage negotiations in Scotland in July 1602. A committee of "4 Stewarts" to arbitrate in the feuds and disagreements between the Marquess of Huntly and the Earl of Moray. The four Stewarts were Lord Ochiltree, Walter Stewart of Blantyre, Alexander Stewart of Garlies, and the Tutor of Rosyth.

One solution offered was the marriage of Moray to Huntly's daughter, and Huntly's son to a daughter of the Earl of Argyll. However, in February 1603 Anne of Denmark proposed an alternative solution, that Huntly's son, Lord Gordon, would marry Moray's sister in a double marriage. Moray's sister, perhaps Margaret Stewart, had recently joined the queen's court. The marriage plans were abandoned at this time, but the scheme suggested by the "4 Stewarts" was adopted.

After the Union of the Crowns in 1603, she was appointed to be a lady of the queen's drawing chamber. At Winchester in September the queen ordered fabrics for new clothes for Stewart and other women who had made the journey from Scotland, including Anne Livingstone, Jean Drummond, and Margaret Hartsyde.

In September 1603, Margaret Stewart married Charles Howard, 1st Earl of Nottingham. She attended the trial of Sir Walter Ralegh and the Earl of Cobham in November 1603 with the Countess of Suffolk and Arbella Stuart.

Nottingham was an older man and the marriage in September attracted comment from Anne of Denmark and her brother Christian IV of Denmark, Arbella Stuart, Thomas Edmondes and other letter writers. Anne of Denmark wrote a letter to King James describing them as a match between Mars and Venus.

They had two children:

- Charles Howard, 3rd Earl of Nottingham
- Anne Howard (born c. 1612), married on 29 December 1627 to Alexander Stewart, Baron Garlies, son of Alexander Stewart, 1st Earl of Galloway and Grizel Gordon.

Arbella Stuart wrote to the Earl of Shrewsbury that the Lord Admiral had been to visit Prince Henry and Princess Elizabeth and, "either is or will be my Cousin before incredulous you will believe such incongruities in a Counsellour."

Edmondes described their meeting during dancing organised by the queen at Basing House. The Earl of Worcester wrote of a gallant of 70 years that in one night could dance himself into a fair lady's favour. Robert Cecil wrote that Nottingham had "begun the union", meaning the union of the kingdoms of England and Scotland. The king gave her Chelsea Place and a yearly pension of £600.

In January 1604 she played the part of Concordia in the masque The Vision of the Twelve Goddesses, wearing "crimson and white, the colours of England and Scotland joined". Her party-colored mantle of crimson and white was embroidered in silver with clasped hands and she carried a bush with red and white roses as an offering in the Temple of Peace. Her role in the masque made an allusion to the union of England and Scotland.

In December 1604 she was excused from performing in the queen's masque, The Masque of Blackness, because she had a "polypus" which was thought to require surgery. Ann Howard, her daughter-in-law, appears in the cast list as "Lady Effingham", in the part of "Psychrote". Margaret did not appear in any further court masques.

Her husband was involved with the negotiations with Spain known as the Somerset House Conference and the subsequent ratification of the treaty at Valladolid. The King of Spain, Philip III gave him a diamond and gold feather jewel for his hat, and other jewellery and gilt plate. The countess was given a gold chain with diamonds and portraits of Philip III and Margaret of Austria, Queen of Spain, and a casket decorated with diamonds and the Spanish royal portraits, and perfumed gloves and other perfumed goods.

=== Misunderstanding on the Thames ===
In 1606, when Christian IV was preparing to leave London, he had an argument with the Earl of Nottingham aboard ship about time and tide. The Danish king insisted it was two o'clock and waved two fingers at the Earl. Nottingham or the countess thought he had made a joke about their age difference. An angry correspondence ensued.

Arbella Stuart attempted to mediate in the scandal in letters to Christian's chamberlain, Sir Andrew Sinclair. Margaret insisted in a letter to Sinclair that Christian IV should know "that I deserve as little that name he gave me as either the mother of himself or his children". Sinclair had to pass the letter on to Christian IV. Anne of Denmark asked James to banish her from court.

The French ambassador Antoine Lefèvre de la Boderie was aware of the quarrel, and wrote of the age difference between Lady Nottingham and the Admiral. He describes the argument centering on a clock and the time of departure. Christian IV two or three times indicated the time two o'clock with his fingers. The Countess, who was pregnant, thought Christian IV and Anne of Denmark were laughing at her. Boderie knew that Margaret had written to Sinclair, and Anne of Denmark had expelled her from court, berating her as the grandchild of an illegitimate son of James V. His letter is an important source for our knowledge of the incident. Boderie's version of events was a source of amusement to Henry IV of France.

Dudley Carleton found fault with Christian IV. He heard that Christian IV had written to Anne of Denmark to complain about the Countess of Nottingham's letter to him, which did "some hurt". Carleton thought that Christian IV had shown two fingers to the Earl of Nottingham, who took no offence. The Countess was offended, more so because she was pregnant and anxious of her credit and honour.

Another, possibly apocryphal, cause for the quarrel was included in Edward Peyton's Catastrophe of the House of Stuarts. During The Entertainment of the Kings of Great Britain and Denmark at Theobalds House. King James was carried to bed and Christian IV was so "disguised" or drunk that he tried to seduce the Countess of Nottingham, causing a quarrel with the Earl of Nottingham, "And Denmark was so disguised, as he would have lain with the Countess of Nottingham, making horns in derision at her husband the high Admiral of England; which caused a deep discontent between them".

== Life at court ==
The countess seems to have been quickly returned to royal favour. Like many courtiers she gave Anne of Denmark clothes as New Year's Day gifts. On 1 January 1609, she gave the queen a satin petticoat embroidered round about the hem and up the front with grapes, roses, pansies, birds, clouds, and bats described as "fruits batts or flindermyse".

There was another incident at the wedding of Princess Elizabeth and Frederick V of the Palatinate in February 1613, recorded by the master of court ceremony, John Finet. He noted a confrontation between the French ambassador's wife and the Countess of Nottingham. As the ambassador's wife was directed to a place at dinner deemed inappropriate by the Countess, she grasped her hand and would not let her go all through the meal.

In July 1614, she was a godparent to Thomas Ingram.

When the Earl of Nottingham gave up the admiralty he was declared to be the first earl of England. However, during the planning of the funeral of Anne of Denmark in 1619 other aristocrats including Alethea Howard, Countess of Arundel and Dorothy Percy, Countess of Northumberland refused to give her precedence. One solution suggested was to make Helena, Marchioness of Northampton the chief mourner.

== Material culture ==
An inventory of luxury goods belonging to Margaret and the Earl of Nottingham written by the notary David Moysie in 1606 gives an idea of the material culture of Jacobean courtiers. There were a large number of buttons set with diamonds and rubies, a flask of amber for musk, two bezoar stones, a variety of silver plate including a lemon squeezer and dishes for sausages and eggs, a silver sugar box shaped like a scallop shell, and bed curtains of velvet and of "China stuff." A portrait of the countess attributed to Paul van Somer places her in a rich interior with curtains dressed with bobbin lace and wearing needle lace collar and cuffs.

== William Monson ==
After her first husband's death, she married William Monson, 1st Viscount Monson in October 1625 at Reigate. She rode with him in the market on the next day and several visits to show off her new husband. They had no children.

With other Chelsea residents, including Katherine Villiers, Duchess of Buckingham she was a partner in Lady Lane of Horton's Charity. Margaret died in her house at Covent Garden on 4 August 1639 and was buried at Chelsea.

== Notes ==
- Henderson, Thomas Finlayson (1898). "Stewart, James (d.1592)" . In Lee, Sidney (ed.). Dictionary of National Biography. Vol. 54. London: Smith, Elder & Co. pp. 307–308.
