= Charles Howard, 3rd Earl of Nottingham =

The Earl of Nottingham
- Born: 25 December 1610
- Died: 26 April 1681 (aged 70)
- Noble family: Howard-Effingham
- Spouse: Arabella Smith
- Father: Charles Howard, 1st Earl of Nottingham
- Mother: Margaret Stuart

Charles Howard, 3rd Earl of Nottingham (25 December 1610 – 26 April 1681) was the son of Charles Howard, 1st Earl of Nottingham by his second wife, the former Margaret Stuart. He studied at the University of Oxford, where he had a reputation for exceptional wildness, and he damaged his prospects by an impulsive love marriage to a barrister's daughter, a marriage which both families disapproved of.

He inherited the earldom following the death of his half-brother, Charles Howard, 2nd Earl of Nottingham. He was married around 1627 to Arabella Smith, "a lady of surpassing beauty and charm", the daughter of Edward Smith, a barrister, and sister of Sir Edward Smith, Chief Justice of the Irish Common Pleas. They had no children.

When he died, the Earldom of Nottingham became extinct, but the Barony was succeeded by Francis Howard, 5th Baron Howard of Effingham.

Peerage of England
Preceded by Charles Howard	Earl of Nottingham; 6th creation 1642–1681	Extinct
Preceded by Charles Howard	Baron Howard of Effingham; 1642–1681	Succeeded by Francis Howard
