= William Howard, 3rd Baron Howard of Effingham =

English nobleman

William Howard, 3rd Baron Howard of Effingham (27 December 1577 – 28 November 1615) was an English nobleman, the eldest son of Charles Howard, 1st Earl of Nottingham (who as Lord Howard of Effingham famously led the English fleet against the Spanish Armada) and Catherine Carey, Lady of the chamber to Queen Elizabeth who died 25 Feb 1603 at Arundel House, Strand, Middlesex, ENG.

As Sir William Howard, he was elected Member of Parliament for Surrey in 1597. However, two days before the Parliament met his father was raised to an Earldom. This meant that, as his heir, William acquired the courtesy title Lord Howard of Effingham. It seems that all concerned mistakenly believed that this disqualified him from sitting in the House of Commons, and his younger brother, Charles, was elected to replace him and sat for Surrey throughout the Parliament. However, the same mistake was not made at the next election and William represented Surrey in the Parliament of 1601.

In 1603, he was summoned to the House of Lords in his father's barony by a writ of acceleration, and sat as a peer until his death. However, he died before his father, without male issue. Both the Earldom and barony were therefore eventually inherited by his younger brother, and William is not considered by some sources to have succeeded as 3rd Baron Howard of Effingham.

Howard married Ann St John, daughter of John St John, 2nd Baron St John of Bletso, on 7 February 1597: they had one daughter, Elizabeth (1603–1671), who married John Mordaunt, 1st Earl of Peterborough. He died in 1615, aged only 37, at Hampton in Middlesex.

Ann Howard, Lady Effingham played the part of "Psychrote" in The Masque of Blackness in January 1605.

== Notes ==
Parliament of England
Preceded by Sir John Wolley; Sir William More	Member of Parliament for Surrey; 1597; With: Sir George More	Succeeded by Sir George More; Charles Howard
Preceded by Sir George More; Charles Howard	Member of Parliament for Surrey; 1601; With: Sir George More	Succeeded by Sir Edmund Bowyer; Sir Robert More
Peerage of England
Preceded by Charles Howard	Baron Howard of Effingham (writ in acceleration); 1603–1615	Succeeded by Charles Howard
