= William Ives (businessman) =

British steel magnate (1943–2017)

William Ives (12 October 1943 – 31 August 2017) was a British steel magnate who was a major donor to the British Conservative Party.

Ives was a former boxer who once worked as a doorman at Esmeralda's Barn, the gambling club owned by the Kray Twins in the early 1960s. In 1973, he founded Rainham Steel which was the source of his wealth. In 2012, Ives accepted a caution from Essex Police for harassing his ex-wife. The incident was seen in the British press as an embarrassment for the Conservative Party.
