= Henry Howard, 3rd Earl of Effingham =

English peer

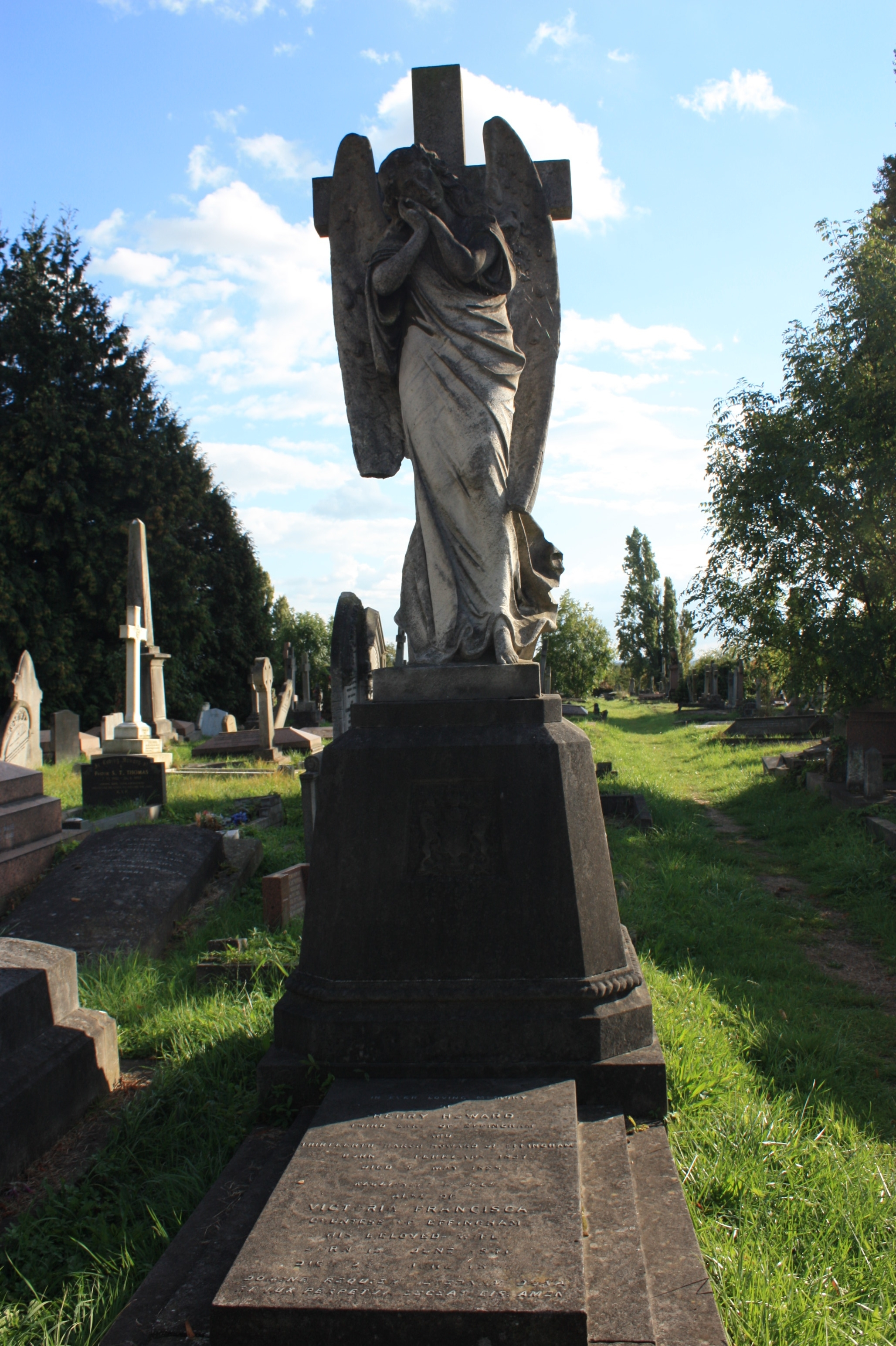
The grave of Henry Howard, 3rd Earl of Effingham, Kensal Green Cemetery

Henry Howard, 3rd Earl of Effingham (7 February 1837 – 4 May 1898) was an English peer, styled Lord Howard from 1845 to 1889.

He was educated at Harrow and Christ Church, Oxford, and served as a cornet in the Oxfordshire Yeomanry.

On 31 October 1865, he married Victoria Francesca Boyer (d. 1899), by whom he had one son:

- Henry Alexander Gordon Howard, 4th Earl of Effingham (1866–1927)

He is buried in Kensal Green Cemetery in London slightly west of the main chapel.

Henry succeeded him as Earl on his death in 1898.

Peerage of the United Kingdom
Preceded by Henry Howard	Earl of Effingham; 1889–1898	Succeeded by Henry Howard
