= Kenneth Howard, 1st Earl of Effingham =

British army officer and peer

Lieutenant-General The Right Honourable The Earl of Effingham GCB
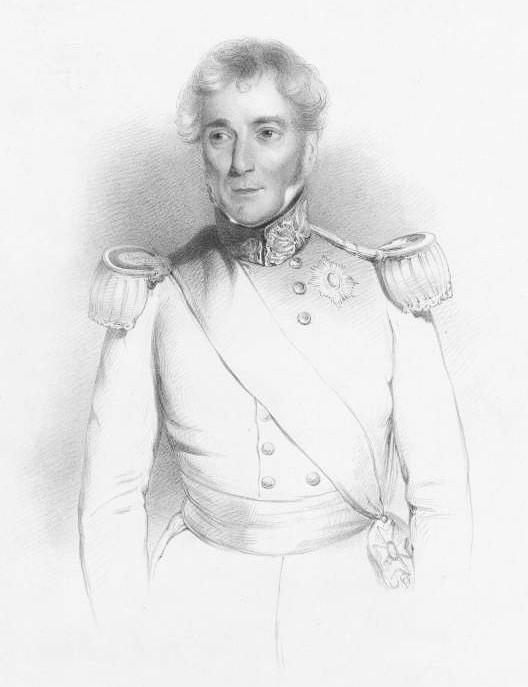
- Print by Thomas Fairland
- Born: 29 November 1767
- Died: 13 February 1845 (aged 77)
- Military career
- Allegiance: United Kingdom
- Branch: British Army
- Rank: Lieutenant-General
- Conflicts: French Revolutionary Wars; Napoleonic Wars

Kenneth Alexander Howard, 1st Earl of Effingham, GCB (29 November 1767 – 13 February 1845) was a British Army officer and peer.

== Background and early life ==
His father, Henry Howard (14 January 1736 – 10 September 1811), was the son of Lieutenant-General Thomas Howard and a male-line descendant of William Howard, 1st Baron Howard of Effingham. His mother, Maria Mackenzie (bef. 1751 – 29 January 1826), was parental granddaughter of William Mackenzie, 5th Earl of Seaforth and maternal one of Alexander Stewart, 6th Earl of Galloway. From 1781 to 1786, Howard was a Page of Honour to George III.

== Military career ==
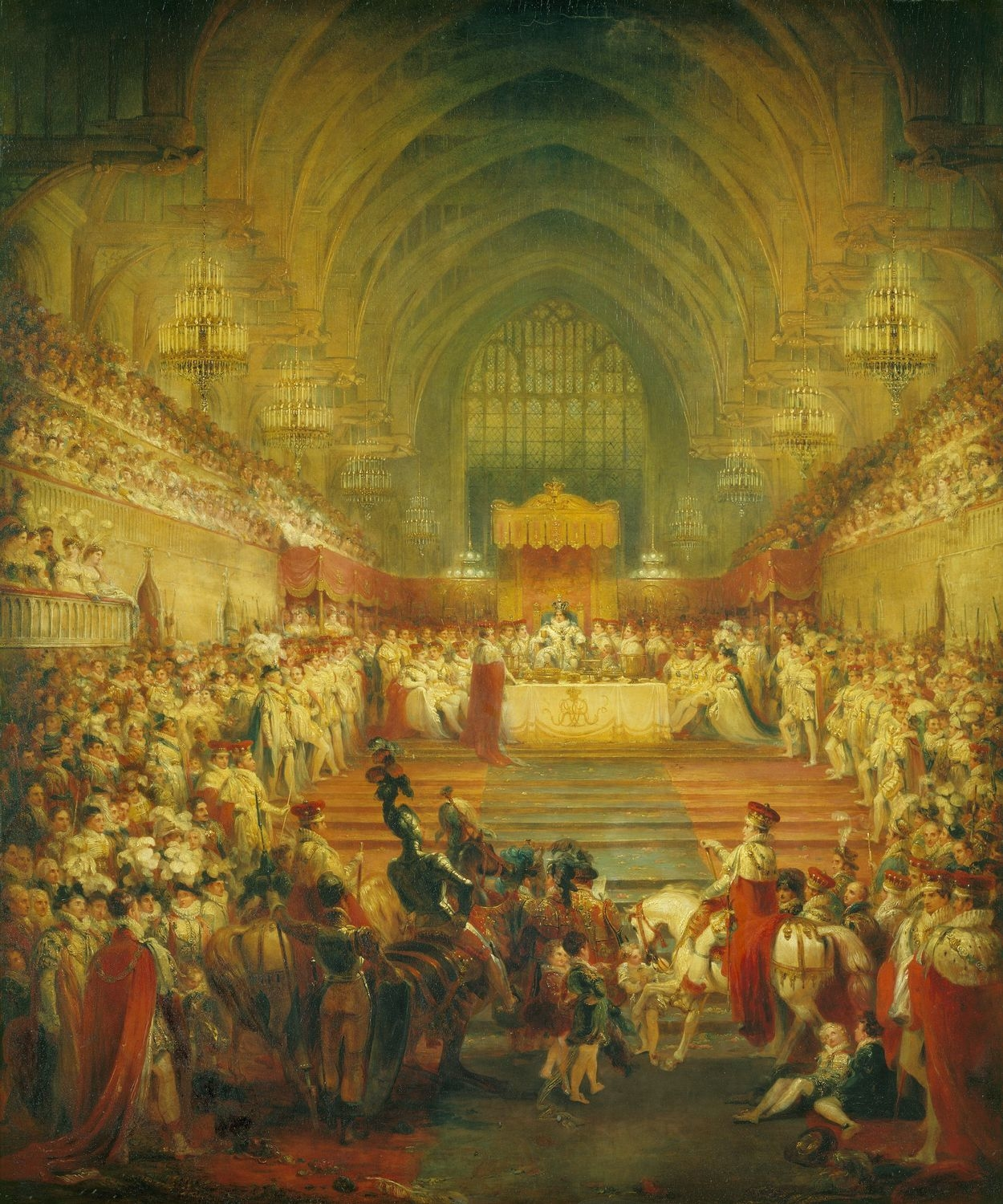
The Banquet at the Coronation of George IV by George Jones. Effingham played a ceremonial role during George IV's Coronation in 1821.

Howard was gazetted to an ensigncy in the Coldstream Guards, 21 April 1786, and served with his regiment in Flanders from February 1793 to May 1795, being wounded at St. Amand 8 May 1793. He was promoted lieutenant and captain 25 April 1793 (acting as adjutant of his regiment from December 1793 to December 1797), captain-lieutenant and lieutenant-colonel 30 December 1797, and brigade-major to the foot-guards 17 April 1798, in which capacity he served throughout the Irish rebellion of that year and the Duke of York's expedition to Holland in 1799. He was present in every action of the last-named campaign. He was gazetted captain and lieutenant-colonel 25 July 1799, and was connected with the foreign troops in the English service as deputy inspector-general, inspector-general, and commandant of the foreign depôt. This latter office he resigned on being appointed colonel and aide-de-camp to the king, 1 January 1805. He became second major of his regiment 4 August 1808, and major-general 25 July 1810.

In January 1811 Howard joined the army in the Peninsula, being placed in command of a brigade of the 1st Division in succession to Sir William Erskine (Wellington Supplementary Despatches, xiii. 544). In the following July, he was transferred to the 2nd Division, as second-in-command under Lord Hill till August 1812. In November of that year, he was selected to command the 1st brigade of guards in the 1st Division, and was in entire command of that division under Sir John Hope from June 1813 to the end of the war. He was present at the battles of Fuentes de Oñoro, Arroyo de Molinos, and Almaraz, and was on the two latter occasions specially commended for gallantry in Lord Hill's despatches (Wellington Despatches, viii. 381–3, 388, ix. 184–5), and was thanked by the home government (Sidney, Life of Lord Hill, pp. 199–200). He took continuous part in the operations on the frontier, 1813–14, and received the medal and one clasp for Vitoria and the passage of the Nive. On the conclusion of the war he became Lieutenant-Governor of Portsmouth and General Officer Commanding South-West District. The duties of this post prevented his joining the army in Belgium, but after Waterloo he was placed in command of the 1st Division of the British Army during the occupation of France, with the local rank of lieutenant-general.

Howard succeeded his third cousin Richard Howard, 4th Earl of Effingham as 11th Baron Howard of Effingham in 1816. In 1837 he was created Earl of Effingham.

== Family ==
Lord Effingham married Lady Charlotte Primrose (c. 1776 – 17 September 1864), daughter of Neil Primrose, 3rd Earl of Rosebery, on 27 May 1800, by whom he had five children:

- Lady Charlotte Howard (30 October 1803 – 8 March 1886).
- Henry Howard, 2nd Earl of Effingham.
- Charles Howard (6 December 1807 – 8 March 1882).
- Lady Arabella Georgina Howard (25 January 1809 – 10 December 1884), married Francis Baring, 1st Baron Northbrook (as his second wife).
- Reverend Hon. William Howard (23 April 1815 – 12 May 1881).

Military offices
Preceded by William Houston	GOC South-West District; 1814–1819	Succeeded by Sir James Kempt
Preceded by Sir George Don	Colonel of the 3rd (East Kent) Regiment of Foot ("The Buffs"); 1832–1845	Succeeded by Sir Henry King
Preceded by Forbes Champagné	Colonel of the 70th (Glasgow Lowland) Regiment of Foot; 1816–1832	Succeeded by Gage John Hall
Court offices
Preceded by William Cerjat	Page of Honour; 1781–1786	Succeeded by James Cockburn
Peerage of England
Preceded by Richard Howard	Baron Howard of Effingham; 1816–1845	Succeeded by Henry Howard
Peerage of the United Kingdom
New creation	Earl of Effingham; 1837–1845	Succeeded by Henry Howard
