= Catherine Howard, Countess of Nottingham =

English noblewoman (c. 1550 – 1603)

Catherine Carey
- Countess of Nottingham
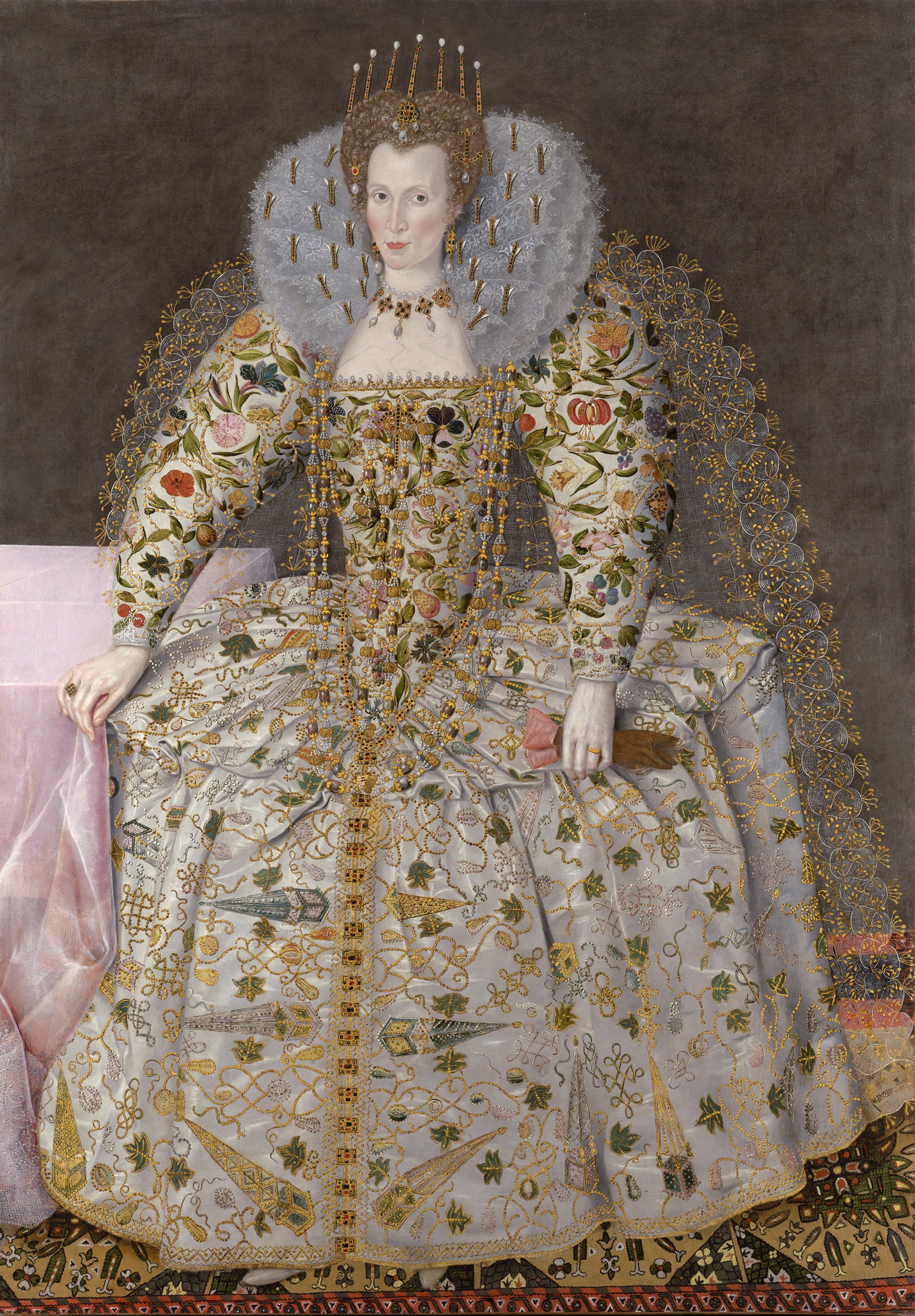
- Portrait believed to be of Catherine Howard, Countess of Nottingham, attributed to Robert Peake the Elder and his studio, c. 1597.
- Born: c. 1550
- Died: 25 February 1603 (aged 52–53); Arundel House
- Buried: 25 April 1603; Chelsea Old Church
- Noble family: Carey
- Spouse: Charles Howard, 1st Earl of Nottingham
- Issue: Frances Howard, Countess of Kildare; William Howard, 3rd Baron Howard of Effingham; Charles Howard, 2nd Earl of Nottingham; Margaret Howard; Elizabeth Howard, Countess of Carrick
- Father: Henry Carey, 1st Baron Hunsdon
- Mother: Anne Morgan
- Occupation: First Lady of the Bedchamber to Queen Elizabeth I

Catherine Howard, Countess of Nottingham (née Carey; c. 1550 – 25 February 1603), was a cousin, lady-in-waiting, and close confidante of Elizabeth I of England. She was in attendance on the queen for 44 years.

== Life ==
Catherine Carey was the eldest daughter of Henry Carey, 1st Baron Hunsdon and his wife Anne Morgan, daughter of Sir Thomas Morgan and Anne Whitney. Hunsdon was Queen Elizabeth's cousin, being the son of Mary Boleyn, and court gossip hinted at a closer connection, since Mary had been the mistress of Henry VIII. Catherine may have joined Elizabeth's household at Hatfield House as a child during the reign of Elizabeth's elder sister Mary. On Elizabeth's accession, Catherine and her younger sister Philadelphia came to court as maids of honour under the auspices of their aunt, Catherine Carey, the queen's first cousin and a Lady of the Bedchamber.

In July 1563, Catherine married Charles Howard (1536–1624), later 2nd Baron Howard of Effingham, Lord High Admiral of England, and first Earl of Nottingham (1597).

Catherine was appointed First Lady of the Bedchamber by 1572. Elizabeth I gave her gifts of clothing, including a French-style gown of wrought velvet.

Her daughter Elizabeth, the queen's goddaughter, was a maid of honour from 1576 until 1583, the year of her marriage. Her daughter Frances, dowager Countess of Kildare, and granddaughter Elizabeth Southwell joined her in the queen's inner circle in the 1590s. Her health began to decline in 1601, and she died at Arundel House on 25 February 1603, only weeks before the death of the queen she had served for 45 years. She was buried at Chelsea Old Church on 25 April 1603.

== Issue ==
The Earl and Countess of Nottingham had five children:

- Frances Howard (buried 11 July 1628). She was married first to Henry FitzGerald, 12th Earl of Kildare. She was secondly married to Henry Brooke, 11th Baron Cobham.
- William Howard, 3rd Baron Howard of Effingham (27 December 1577 – 28 November 1615). Summoned to the Lords as 3rd Baron Howard of Effingham. He was married on 7 February 1596/1597 to Anne St John.
- Charles Howard, 2nd Earl of Nottingham (17 September 1579 – 3 October 1642). He was married first on 19 May 1597 to Charity White (d. 18 December 1618), daughter to Robert White. Secondly on 22 April 1620 to Mary Cokayne, daughter of Sir William Cockayne who served as Lord Mayor of London in 1619 and Mary Morris.
- Margaret Howard, married in 1587 Sir Richard Leveson (died 1605), one child, died in infancy. After a mental breakdown, her wardship was awarded to her brother, William, on the death of Leveson and to her father in 1615.
- Elizabeth Howard (buried 31 March 1646). Maid of honour to Elizabeth I (1576 until 1583). She married Sir Robert Southwell (1563 – c. 1598/9) in 1583. One of their daughters, Elizabeth, also a maid of honour to Elizabeth from 1599, was a lover and eventually the third wife of her cousin Sir Robert Dudley, the illegitimate son of the Earl of Leicester and Douglass Sheffield. Another daughter, Frances, married Edward Rodney, and a daughter Catherine (d. 1657) married Sir Greville Verney, 7th Baron Willoughby de Broke (c. 1586 – 1642). Elizabeth Howard was secondly married to John Stewart, 1st Earl of Carrick, (d. 1644).

== The Countess and the legend of the Essex ring ==
There is a widely repeated romantic legend about a ring given by Queen Elizabeth to the Earl of Essex. There is a possible reference to the legend by John Webster in his 1623 play The Devil's Law Case suggesting that it was known at this time, but the first printed version of it is in the 1695 romantic novel The Secret History of the most renowned Queen Elizabeth and the Earl of Essex, by a Person of Quality. The version given by David Hume in his History of England says that Elizabeth had given Essex a ring after his expedition to Cádiz that he should send to her if he was in trouble. After his trial for his rebellion against the queen, he tried to send the ring to Elizabeth via Catherine, but the Countess kept the ring because her husband was an enemy of Essex. As a result, Essex was executed. On her deathbed, two years later, Catherine is said to have confessed this to Elizabeth, who angrily replied: "May God forgive you, Madam, but I never can". The Queen's Diamond Jubilee Galleries in Westminster Abbey possess a gold ring which is claimed to be this one.

Some historians consider this story of the ring to be a myth, partly because there are no contemporaneous accounts of it. John Lingard in his history of England says the story appears to be fiction. Lytton Strachey states "Such a narrative is appropriate enough to the place where it was first fully elaborated—a sentimental novelette, but it does not belong to history", and Alison Weir calls it a fabrication.

Nevertheless, this version of the story forms the basis of the plot of Gaetano Donizetti's opera Roberto Devereux, with a further twist added to the story, in that Essex is cheating on both the queen and his best friend by having an affair with Lady Nottingham (who in the opera is given the wrong first name of Sarah rather than Catherine): and that this turns out to be (a) the reason why Lord Nottingham turns against his now former friend, when he discovers the ring in question and prevents her sending it, and (b) is the ultimate reason for Queen Elizabeth withdrawing her support for Essex at his trial.
