= David Howard, 7th Earl of Effingham =

Royal Navy officer and peer (1939–2022)

Commander The Right Honourable The Earl of Effingham
- Predecessor: Mowbray Howard, 6th Earl of Effingham
- Successor: Edward Howard, 8th Earl of Effingham
- Born: 29 April 1939
- Died: 26 February 2022 (aged 82)

David Mowbray Algernon Howard, 7th Earl of Effingham (29 April 1939 – 26 February 2022) was a Royal Navy officer and peer who was a member of the House of Lords from 1996 until 1999. A Deputy Lieutenant of Essex, he was president of the Royal British Legion.

== Early life ==
The son of John Algernon Frederick Charles Howard, a younger son of Gordon Howard, 5th Earl of Effingham, and his wife Suzanne Patricia Macassey, the young Howard was educated at Fettes College and the Royal Naval College, Dartmouth.

== Career ==
From Dartmouth, Howard was commissioned as a career officer into the Royal Navy, ultimately rising to the rank of Commander. In his later career, he was an intelligence officer and developed expertise in new forms of intelligence-gathering.

On 22 February 1996, Commander Howard succeeded an uncle, Mowbray Howard, as Earl of Effingham in the peerage of the United Kingdom (1837) and as Baron Howard of Effingham in the peerage of England (1554). He was appointed by Elizabeth II as a Deputy Lieutenant of Essex and was elected as president of the Royal British Legion.

Effingham's seat in the Lords as a hereditary peer came to an end as a result of the House of Lords Act 1999. In 2018 he stood in a by-election for one of the ninety seats in the House of Lords reserved for hereditary peers, saying in his supporting statement:

Although I am confined to a wheelchair I am not past my sell by date and have been active in the past in general debates.

== Private life ==
On 10 October 1964, Howard married Anne Mary Sayer, daughter of Harrison Sayer. They were divorced in 1975, after having a son:

- Edward Mowbray Nicholas Howard (born 1971), later 8th Earl of Effingham.

On 29 December 1992, seventeen years after his divorce, Howard married Elizabeth Jane Eccleston, daughter of Dennis Eccleston. As of 2003, the couple were living at Readings Farmhouse, Blackmore End, Wethersfield, Essex.

Lord Effingham died on 26 February 2022, at the age of 82. He was succeeded by his son, Edward Howard.

== Notes ==
Peerage of the United Kingdom
Preceded by Mowbray Howard	Earl of Effingham; 1996–2022	Succeeded by Edward Howard
