= Gordon Howard, 5th Earl of Effingham =

English peer

Gordon Frederick Henry Charles Howard, 5th Earl of Effingham (18 May 1873 – 7 July 1946) was an English peer and member of the House of Lords. The son of Hon. Frederick Charles Howard and grandson of Henry Howard, 2nd Earl of Effingham, he inherited the earldom in 1927 from his cousin, Henry Howard, 4th Earl of Effingham.

== Early life ==
Howard was the son of the Hon. Frederick Charles Howard and Lady Constance Eleanora Caroline Finch-Hatton. The Hon. Frederick was a younger son of Henry Howard, 2nd Earl of Effingham, while Lady Constance was the daughter of George Finch-Hatton, 11th Earl of Winchilsea.

In 1927, Howard inherited the earldom upon the death of his cousin, Henry Howard, 4th Earl of Effingham. He had earned his living as an art dealer in New York City before inheriting the earldom.

== Personal life ==
In 1904, Howard married Rosamond Margaret Hudson. They had two children, both boys, before being divorced in 1914. The children were:

- Mowbray Henry Gordon Howard, 6th Earl of Effingham (1905–1996)
- Hon. John Algernon Frederick Charles Howard (29 December 1907 – 24 April 1970), father of David Howard, 7th Earl of Effingham

In 1924, ten years after his divorce, Howard married Madeleine Foshay (d. 1958). Together, Howard and Foshay had one son:

- Nicholas Howard (1919–2016)

Peerage of the United Kingdom
Preceded by Henry Howard	Earl of Effingham; 1927–1946	Succeeded by Mowbray Howard
