= Rainham Steel =

Rainham Steel Co. Limited is a steel stockholder and distributor based in South Hornchurch. The firm was founded in 1973 by William Ives, Phillip Lee and Lance O'Brian as Rainham Steel, formerly known as Rainham Reuseables. In 1986 William Ives and Phillip Lee acquired Lance O'Brian's share of the company, forming a partnership which carried on until 1992 when Phillip Lee retired.

Rainham have made a major investment in new plant at Scunthorpe.

== Sport ==
The firm is known for its sports sponsorship which reflects the sporting and business interests of Ives who is a former boxer. The firm have sponsored Scunthorpe United F.C. amongst others.
