= Henry Howard, 4th Earl of Effingham =

English peer

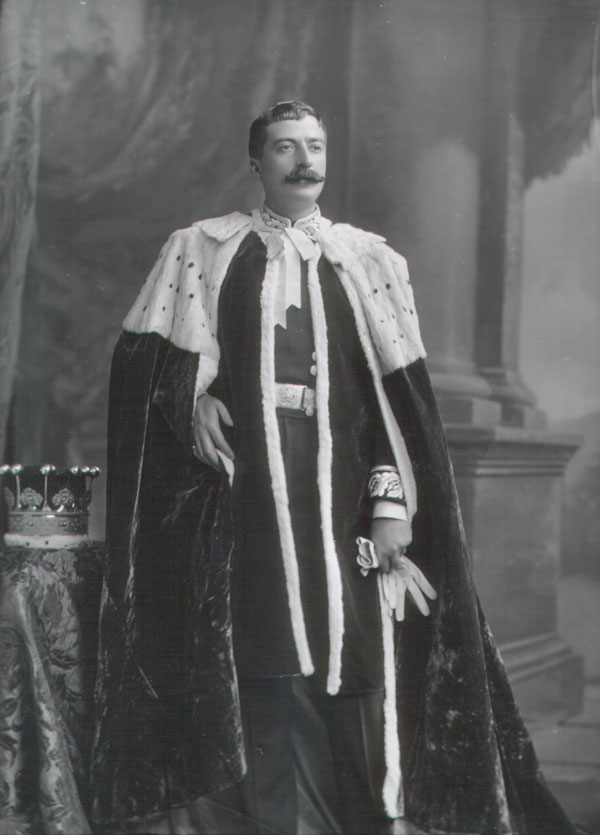
Henry Howard, 4th Earl of Effingham in coronation robes, 1902.

Henry Alexander Gordon Howard, 4th Earl of Effingham, DL (15 August 1866 – 6 May 1927), styled Lord Howard from 1889 to 1898, was an English peer and member of the House of Lords. He inherited the earldom from his father, Henry Howard, 3rd Earl of Effingham in 1898.

Effingham was a Deputy Lieutenant of the West Riding of Yorkshire. He was a Liberal Unionist in politics. He was succeeded in the earldom by his first cousin, Gordon Howard, 5th Earl of Effingham.

Peerage of the United Kingdom
Preceded by Henry Howard	Earl of Effingham; 1898–1927	Succeeded by Gordon Howard
