= Anne St John =

English aristocrat and courtier

- Died: June 1638
- Spouse: William Howard (m. 1597; died 1615)
- Children: 1+
- Father: John St John
- Relatives: William Dormer (grandfather); Oliver St John (grandfather); Oliver St John (uncle)

Anne St John (died June 1638) was an English aristocrat and courtier.

== Biography ==
She was a daughter of John St John, 2nd Baron St John of Bletso and Katherine Dormer, a daughter of William Dormer of Wing, Buckinghamshire.

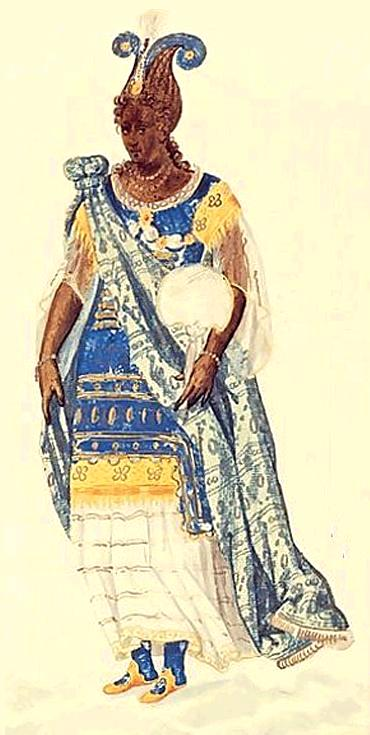
Costume design for The Masque of Blackness by Inigo Jones

She married William Howard, 3rd Baron Howard of Effingham in 1597, and was known as "Lady Effingham". He was a son of Charles Howard, 1st Earl of Nottingham and Catherine Carey.

Her daughter's birth in January 1603 was unexpected, according to John Chamberlain. Elizabeth Howard (1603–1671) married Lord Mordaunt in 1621.

In January 1605 she performed in the court masque, The Masque of Blackness as Psychrote. She was probably a stand-in for her mother-in-law, Margaret Howard, Countess of Nottingham, who was unwell.

Her husband died in 1615. Her properties included Donnington Castle, to which the goldsmith and financier Peter Vanlore also had a claim.

Lady Anne Clifford, a relation, mentions visiting her at the home of Elizabeth Darcy, Lady Lumley on 4 January 1616. There was discussion in 1619 that Lady Effingham might marry Lionel Cranfield, 1st Earl of Middlesex.

Anne, Lady Effingham died in June 1638 and was buried in Westminster Abbey.
