= Mowbray Howard, 6th Earl of Effingham =

British peer

The Right Honourable The Earl of Effingham
- Mowbray Howard, 6th Earl of Effingham

Earl of Effingham
- In office 1946–1996
- Preceded by: Gordon Howard
- Succeeded by: David Howard

Personal details
- Born: 29 November 1905
- Died: 22 February 1996 (aged 90)
- Spouses: Maria Malvina Gertler (m. 1938; div. 1946) Gladys Freeman (m. 1952; div. 1971) Mabel Suzanne Mingay Le Pen (m. 1972)
- Parents: Gordon Howard, 5th Earl of Effingham; Rosamond Hudson
- Education: Lancing College
- Occupation: Peer

Military service
- Allegiance: United Kingdom
- Branch/service: British Army
- Unit: Royal Artillery
- Battles/wars: Second World War

Mowbray Henry Gordon Howard, 6th Earl of Effingham (29 November 1905 – 22 February 1996), styled Lord Howard of Effingham from 1927 to 1946, was a British peer.

He was born on 29 November 1905 to Gordon Howard, 5th Earl of Effingham, and Rosamond Margaret Hudson. He was educated at Lancing College.

In October 1932, Howard was charged with manslaughter after an inquest found that he had knocked down an agricultural labourer in his car. However, the case was dismissed when it came to the magistrates' court at Maidenhead.

He served in the Royal Artillery during the Second World War, succeeding his father as Earl of Effingham on 7 July 1946.

His first wife, Hungarian-born Maria Malvina Gertler, was under suspicion by MI5, and in fact was interned for three months in 1941 on the grounds that she was involved in the "preparation of acts prejudicial to the public safety or the defence of the realm" and held in Holloway prison. They were divorced in 1946.

In 1952 he married Gladys Irene Freeman; they were divorced in 1971. His third wife was (Mabel) Suzanne Mingay Le Pen (1919–2008), whom he married in 1972. He had no children and was succeeded by his nephew David Howard.

In return for £10 per week, Effingham agreed to serve on the board of Esmeralda's Barn, the gambling club operated by the Kray twins in the early 1960s.

== References and sources ==
Sources

- thepeerage.com Mowbray Howard, 6th Earl of Effingham

Peerage of the United Kingdom
Preceded by Gordon Howard	Earl of Effingham; 1946–1996	Succeeded by David Howard
