= Alexander Stewart, 1st Earl of Galloway =

Scottish courtier (c. 1580–1649)

Alexander Stewart, 1st Earl of Galloway (c. 1580-9 October 1649) was a Scottish courtier and landowner.

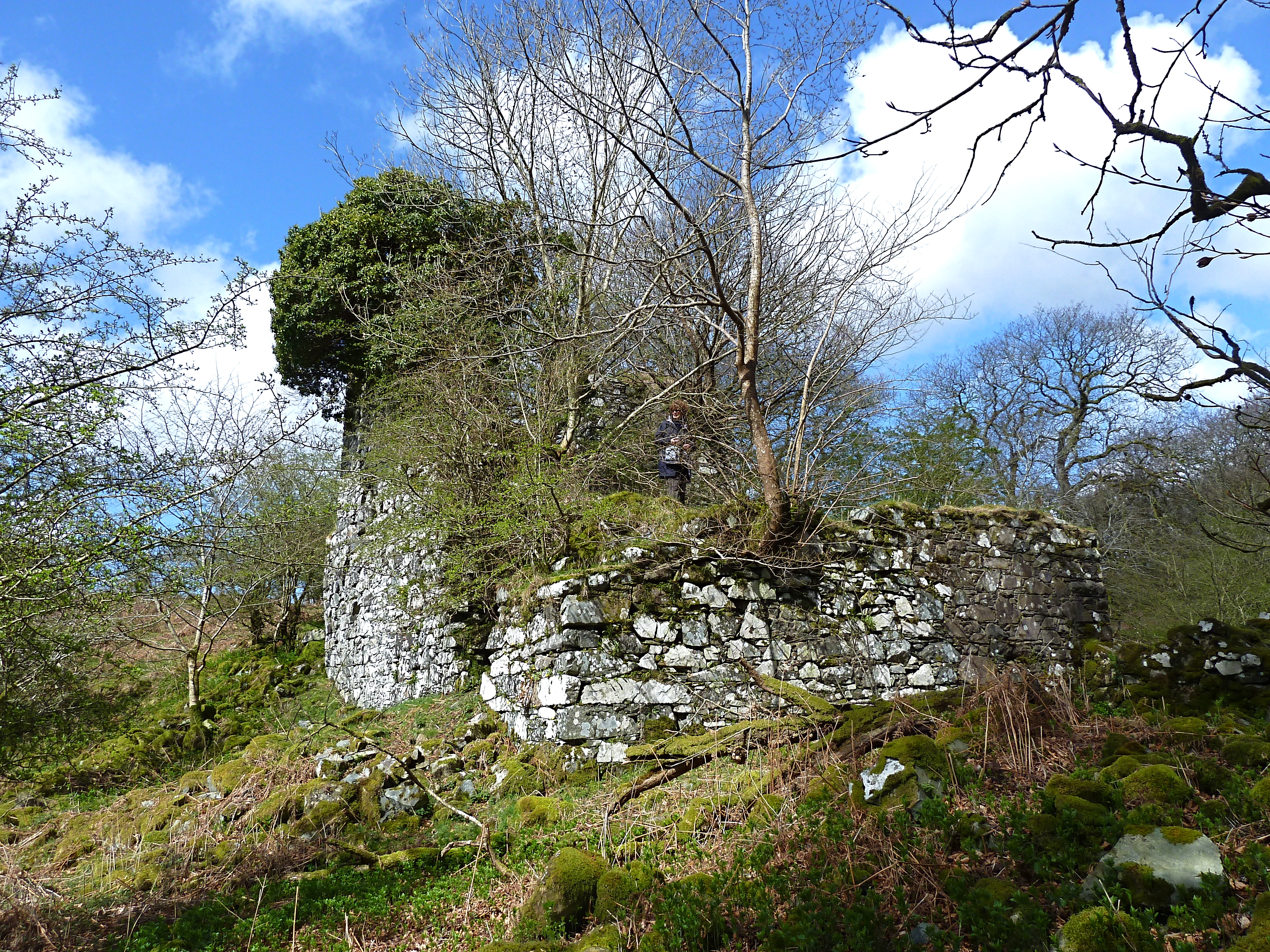
Garlies Castle

He was the son of Sir Alexander Stewart, 6th Laird of Garlies (d. 1597) and his 1st wife Christian Douglas, daughter of Sir James Douglas of Drumlanrig.

The ruins of Garlies Castle are in Dumfries and Galloway. The placename was often spelt "Garleis."

His father, who was knighted in 1590 at the coronation of Anne of Denmark, was awarded the forfeited goods of Cuthbert Broun, a son of John Broun of Carsluith, who was involved in the murder of James MacCulloch of Barholm in 1579.

Alexander Stewart, 'a man of great talent, loyalty and integrity' was in the service of King James VI.

In July 1602 Garlies joined a committee of "4 Stewarts" to arbitrate in the feud between the Marquess of Huntly and the Earl of Moray. The other Stewarts were Lord Ochiltree, Walter Stewart of Blantyre, and the Tutor of Rosyth. One solution offered was the marriage of Moray to Huntly's daughter, and Huntly's son to a daughter of the Earl of Argyll. However, in February 1603 Anne of Denmark proposed an alternative solution, that Huntly's son would marry Moray's sister in a double marriage. Moray's sister, perhaps Margaret Stewart, had recently joined the queen's household. The marriage plans were abandoned at this time, but the scheme suggested by the "4 Stewarts" was eventually adopted.

Stewart was created Lord Garlies on 19 July 1607. He was also Sheriff of Galloway.

As Sheriff of Galloway, in 1618 Lord Garlies brought a mysterious case to the attention of the Privy Council of Scotland and the king's advocate Thomas Hamilton. A severed hand was found in the midden or rubbish heap of a notary called John Kennedy, when his servants were carting manure to the field. Then blood was observed on the chandelier in his house, dripped on his table, and appeared on his cellar door, appearing when Kennedy was out. The blood was a "thick liquor like gored blood". When he was walking with the parish minister drops of blood appeared on the grass. Kennedy was arrested and put in the Tolbooth in Edinburgh for five or six weeks, but no information was found against him. He was examined by the Lord President Alexander Seton, who wrote to Sheriff Lord Garlies to discover if there was any unsolved murder to connect with these portents. The severed hand was old and decayed but Kennedy had only recently bought the house. No explanation was found for the blood on the chandelier and elsewhere. Kennedy said his livestock had suffered unusual casualties and his wife had been ill, and he thought he was the victim of witchcraft. The Privy Council after consultation with Garlies, released him.

He was made Earl of Galloway (Scotland) on 19 September 1623, with a special remainder to his heirs male bearing the name Stewart.

He died on 9 October 1649, leaving two sons and a daughter.

== Family ==
He married Grisel Gordon, daughter of Sir John Gordon of Lochinvar and Kenmure (d. 1604), and Elizabeth Maxwell, in 1600. Their children included:

- James Stewart, who in his father's lifetime had been created a Baronet of Nova Scotia.
- Alexander Stewart, married in 1627 Anne Howard, a daughter of Charles Howard, 1st Earl of Nottingham and Margaret Stewart, a daughter of the Earl of Moray.

Peerage of Scotland
| New creation | Earl of Galloway; 1623–1649 | Succeeded by James Stewart |
| New creation | Lord Garlies; 1607–1649 | Succeeded by James Stewart |
