= Henry Howard, 2nd Earl of Effingham =

British peer and Member of Parliament

The Right Honourable The Earl of Effingham DL
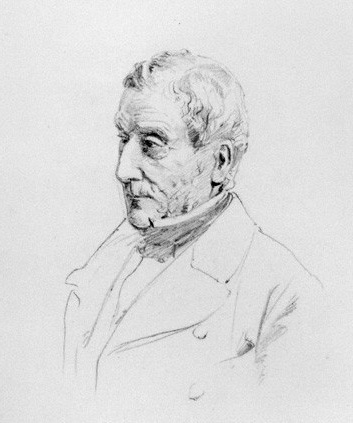
- The Earl of Effingham.

Member of Parliament for Shaftesbury
- In office 1841–1845
- Preceded by: George Mathew
- Succeeded by: Richard Brinsley Sheridan

Personal details
- Born: 23 August 1806
- Died: 5 February 1889 (aged 82)
- Spouse: Eliza Drummond (m. 1832; died 1889)
- Parent(s): Kenneth Howard, 1st Earl of Effingham; Lady Charlotte Primrose
- Education: Harrow School

Henry Howard, 2nd Earl of Effingham, DL (23 August 1806 – 5 February 1889), styled Lord Howard from 1837 to 1845, was a British peer and Member of Parliament.

== Early life ==
Howard was the eldest son of General Kenneth Howard, 1st Earl of Effingham, from his first marriage to Lady Charlotte Primrose, daughter of Neil Primrose, 3rd Earl of Rosebery. He was educated at Harrow.

== Career ==
Howard was commissioned an ensign in the 58th (Rutlandshire) Regiment of Foot on 21 July 1825, and a lieutenant on 14 May 1826. On 9 November 1830, he became a captain in the 10th (North Lincoln) Regiment of Foot, resigning his commission on 29 November 1833. He was elected to the House of Commons for Shaftesbury in 1841, a seat he held until 1845, when he succeeded his father in the earldom and entered the House of Lords. On 17 February 1845, he was appointed a deputy lieutenant of Wiltshire, and on 14 March 1853, a deputy lieutenant of the West Riding of Yorkshire.

== Personal life ==
In 1832, Lord Effingham married Eliza Drummond, daughter of General Sir Gordon Drummond, and granddaughter of Colin Drummond. They had several children:

- Hon. Blanche Eliza Howard (1834–1840), who died young.
- Lady Maria Howard (1835–1928).
- Henry Howard, 3rd Earl of Effingham (1837–1898), who married Victoria Francesca Boyer in 1865.
- Capt. Hon. Frederick Charles Howard (1840–1893), who married Lady Constance Eleanora Caroline, daughter of George Finch-Hatton, 11th Earl of Winchilsea in 1871.
- Lady Alice Howard (1843–1932).
- Hon. Kenneth Howard (1845–1903), a clerk in the Foreign Office.

He died in February 1889, aged 82, and was succeeded in the earldom by his eldest son Henry. The Countess of Effingham died in February 1894.

=== Descendants ===
Through his son Frederick, he was a grandfather of Gordon Howard, 5th Earl of Effingham (1873–1946) and Capt. Hon. Algernon George Mowbray Frederick Howard (1874–1950).

Parliament of the United Kingdom
Preceded by George Mathew	Member of Parliament for Shaftesbury; 1841–1845	Succeeded by Richard Brinsley Sheridan
Peerage of the United Kingdom
Preceded by Kenneth Howard	Earl of Effingham; 1845–1889	Succeeded by Henry Howard
