= Earl of Effingham =

Earldom in the Peerage of the United Kingdom

- Blazon Arms: Gules, on a Bend, between six Crosses-Crosslet fitchée Argent, an Escutcheon in chief (of augmentation) Gules, charged with a Demi-Lion rampant, pierced through the mouth with an Arrow, within a Double-Tresure flory-counterflory Gules. Crest: On a Chapeau Gules, turned up Ermine, a Lion statant guardant, tail extended Or, ducally gorged Argent. Supporters: On either side a Lion Argent, charged on the shoulder with a Mullet for difference.
- Creation date: 27 January 1837
- Created by: King William IV
- Peerage: Peerage of the United Kingdom
- First holder: Kenneth Howard, 1st Earl of Effingham
- Present holder: Edward Howard, 8th Earl of Effingham
- Heir apparent: Frederick Howard, Lord Howard of Effingham
- Remainder to: the 1st Earl's heirs male of the body lawfully begotten
- Subsidiary titles: Baron Howard of Effingham
- Status: Extant
- Motto: VIRTUS MILLE SCUTA (Virtue is worth a thousand shields)

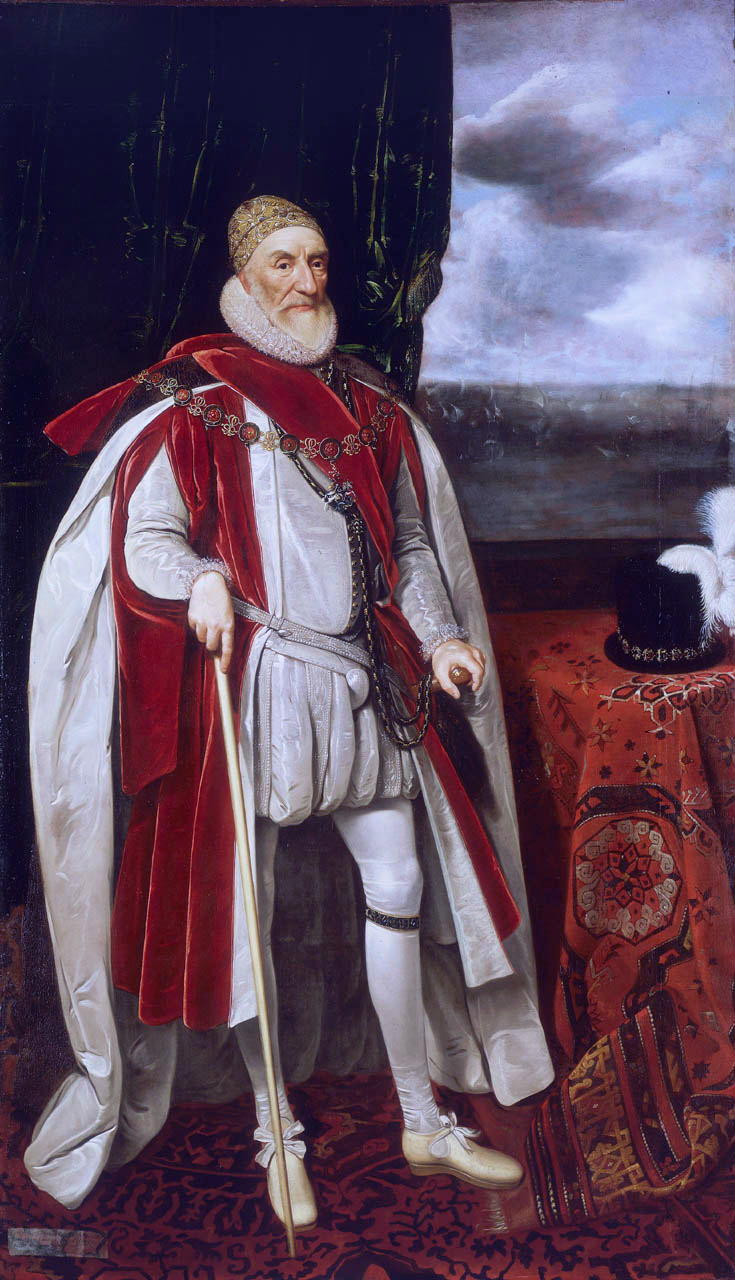
Charles Howard, 1st Earl of Nottingham

Earl of Effingham, in the County of Surrey, is a title in the Peerage of the United Kingdom, created in 1837 for Kenneth Howard, 11th Baron Howard of Effingham, named after the village of Effingham, Surrey, where heads of the family owned the manor.

This branch of the House of Howard stems from the naval commander and statesman Lord William Howard, senior son of Thomas Howard, 2nd Duke of Norfolk from his second marriage to Agnes Tylney. William served as Lord High Admiral of England, as Lord Chamberlain of the Household and as Lord Privy Seal. In 1554 he was created Baron Howard of Effingham in the Peerage of England after leading the defence of London against Wyatt's rebellion. His son and successor was better known to history as Charles Howard, 1st Earl of Nottingham, after being granted that title in 1596. He was Lord High Admiral from 1585 to 1618 and served as commander-in-chief of the English fleet against the Spanish Armada in 1588. In 1603 his eldest son and heir apparent William Howard (1577–1615), was summoned to the House of Lords through a writ of acceleration in his father's junior title of Baron Howard of Effingham. He predeceased his father.

The titles of the Earl of Nottingham passed to a younger son, the second Earl. He represented Bletchingley, Surrey and Sussex in the House of Commons and served as Lord-Lieutenant of Surrey. He was childless and was succeeded by his half-brother, the third Earl. On his death in 1681 the earldom became extinct.

The barony descended to the most senior male heir, who was a first cousin twice removed, who became the fifth Lord Howard. He was the great-grandson of Sir William Howard (d. 1600), a younger son of the first Baron: this Lord Howard of Effingham served as Governor of Virginia from 1683 to 1692.

His eldest son, the sixth Baron, died childless and was succeeded by his younger brother, the seventh Baron, a prominent military commander. In 1731 he was made Earl of Effingham in the Peerage of Great Britain. His grandson, the third Earl, served under William Pitt the Younger as Master of the Mint from 1784 to 1789 and was Governor of Jamaica from 1789 to 1791. He died childless and was succeeded by his younger brother, the fourth Earl. On his death in 1816 the earldom became extinct.

The barony descended to a third cousin, the eleventh Baron. He was the grandson of Lieutenant-General Thomas Howard, a son of George Howard, younger brother of the fifth Baron. Lord Howard of Effingham was a general in the Army. In 1837 the earldom of Effingham was revived when he was made Earl of Effingham, in the County of Surrey, in the Peerage of the United Kingdom. He was succeeded by his eldest son, the second Earl. He represented Shaftesbury in Parliament as a Whig from 1841 to 1845. The titles descended from father to son until the death of his grandson, the fourth Earl, in 1927. He never married and was succeeded by a first cousin, the fifth Earl, the son of Captain the Hon. Frederick Charles Howard (1840–1893), second son of the second Earl. His eldest son, the sixth Earl, died childless in 1996. He was succeeded by his nephew David, the seventh Earl, who died in 2022, being succeeded by his son, the 8th earl (born 1971), the present holder of the titles.

Another member of this branch of the Howard family was Field Marshal Sir George Howard active in the mid-18th century. He was the son of the aforementioned Lieutenant-General Thomas Howard and the brother of Henry Howard, father of Kenneth Alexander Howard, 1st Earl of Effingham.

The family seat in the 21st century is Readings Farmhouse, near Blackmore End, Essex.

The Effingham Howards were not included in a remainder on the restoration of the Dukedom of Norfolk in 1660 and therefore are not eligible to succeed to their ancestors' ancient honours.

== Barons Howard of Effingham (1554) ==
- William Howard, 1st Baron Howard of Effingham (1510–1573)
- Charles Howard, 2nd Baron Howard of Effingham (1536–1624; created Earl of Nottingham in 1596)

== Earls of Nottingham (1596) ==
Coat of arms Howard Earl of Nottingham & Earl of Effingham (original)

- Charles Howard, 1st Earl of Nottingham, 2nd Baron Howard of Effingham (1536–1624)
  - William Howard, Lord Howard of Effingham (1577–1615)
- Charles Howard, 2nd Earl of Nottingham, 3rd Baron Howard of Effingham (1579–1642)
- Charles Howard, 3rd Earl of Nottingham, 4th Baron Howard of Effingham (1610–1681)

== Barons Howard of Effingham (1554; reverted) ==
- Francis Howard, 5th Baron Howard of Effingham (1643–1695)
- Thomas Howard, 6th Baron Howard of Effingham (1682–1725)
- Francis Howard, 7th Baron Howard of Effingham (1683–1743; created Earl of Effingham in 1731)

== Earls of Effingham, first creation (1731) ==
Arms of the Earls of Effingham (1st Creation) Arms of the Duke of Norfolk difference for a third son

- Francis Howard, 1st Earl of Effingham, 7th Baron Howard of Effingham (1683–1743)
- Thomas Howard, 2nd Earl of Effingham, 8th Baron Howard of Effingham (1714–1763)
- Thomas Howard, 3rd Earl of Effingham, 9th Baron Howard of Effingham (1746–1791)
- Richard Howard, 4th Earl of Effingham, 10th Baron Howard of Effingham (1748–1816)

== Barons Howard of Effingham (1554; reverted) ==
- Kenneth Alexander Howard, 11th Baron Howard of Effingham (1767–1845; created Earl of Effingham in 1837)

== Earls of Effingham, second creation (1837) ==
- Kenneth Alexander Howard, 1st Earl of Effingham (1767–1845)
- Henry Howard, 2nd Earl of Effingham (1806–1889)
- Henry Howard, 3rd Earl of Effingham (1837–1898)
- Henry Alexander Gordon Howard, 4th Earl of Effingham (1866–1927)
- Gordon Frederick Henry Charles Howard, 5th Earl of Effingham (1873–1946)
- Mowbray Henry Gordon Howard, 6th Earl of Effingham (1905–1996)
- David Peter Mowbray Algernon Howard, 7th Earl of Effingham (1939–2022)
- Edward Mowbray Nicholas Howard, 8th Earl of Effingham (born 1971)

The heir apparent is the present holder's son Frederick Henry Charles Howard, Lord Howard of Effingham (born 2007).

== See also ==
- Howard family
- Duke of Norfolk
- Earl of Carlisle
- Earl of Suffolk (1603 creation)
- Earl of Berkshire (1626 creation)
- Baron Lanerton
- Viscount Fitzalan of Derwent
- Baron Howard of Penrith
- Baron Howard of Escrick
- Baron Stafford (1640 creation)
- Baron Howard de Walden
