= Manci Howard, Lady Howard of Effingham =

Hungarian suspected spy (1912–2003)

Maria Howard, Lady Howard of Effingham
- Born: Maria Malvina Gertler; 26 December 1912; Budapest, Hungary
- Died: 15 June 2003 (aged 90); Meudon, Hauts-De-Seine, France
- Other name: Manci
- Spouse: Mowbray Howard, Lord Howard of Effingham (m. 1938; div. 1946)

Maria Malvina Howard, Lady Howard of Effingham (née Gertler; 26 December 1912 – 15 June 2003), often known as Manci Howard, was a Hungarian suspected spy.

Howard was born as Maria Malvina Gertler in Budapest, the daughter of Ferenz Joseph Gertler. She went to England in 1935, and in 1938 married Mowbray Howard, Lord Howard of Effingham, who later became the 6th Earl of Effingham. Lord Howard, who was bankrupt, was paid a lump sum and a retainer by Manci Howard's lover, Edward Stanislas Weisblatt, an arms dealer. Manci Howard joined the British Union of Fascists.

Even before the outbreak of the Second World War, she was suspected of espionage, and on 10 February 1941 was interned in Holloway Prison. She was released on 16 July 1941 for lack of conclusive proof against her. Her marriage to Lord Howard was dissolved in 1945 or 1946. After Manci Howard was arrested and held in Holloway prison, she appealed, declaring: "There is nothing I would not do for this country." She was released three months later, as there was no evidence she knew of Weisblatt's suspected activities. Weisblatt was her lover before the war. After her divorce, she moved to Australia.

She died in 2003 in France.
