= Charles Howard, 1st Earl of Nottingham =

English politician and naval commander (1536–1624)

The Right Honourable The Earl of Nottingham KG
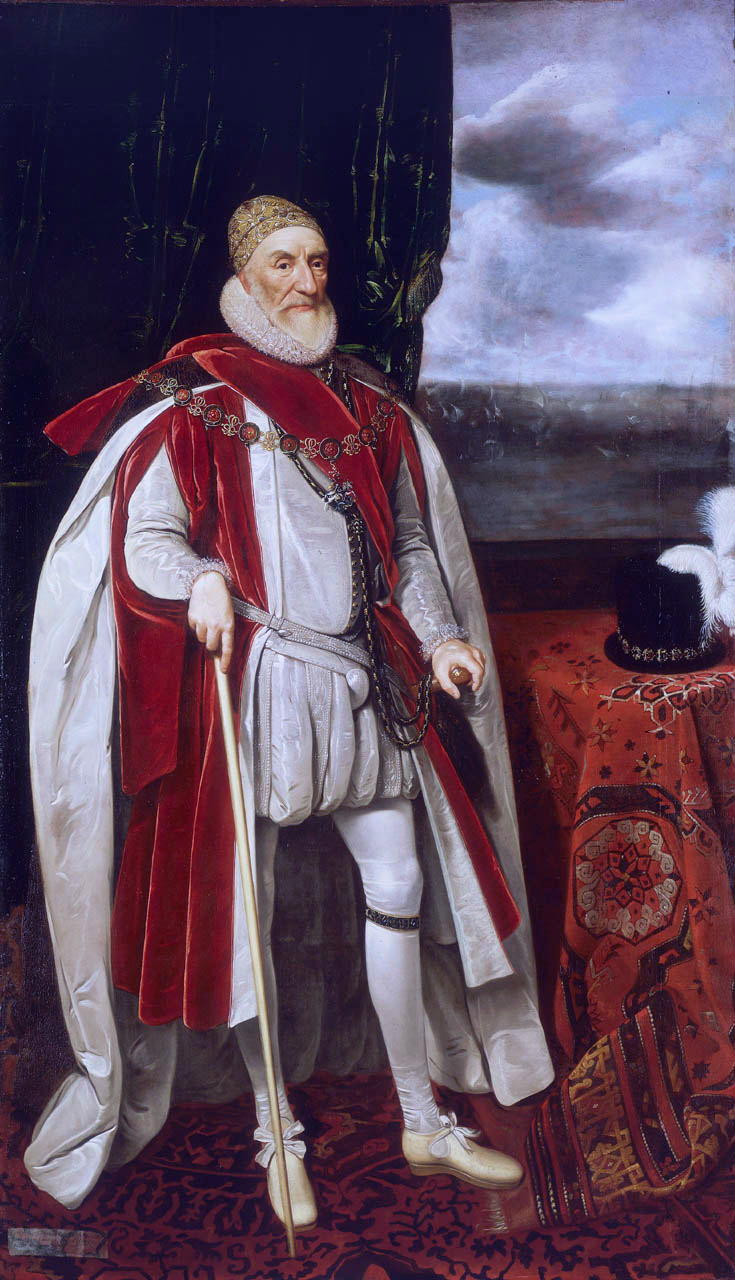
- Charles Howard c. 1620 (Daniel Mytens the Elder)
- Born: 1536
- Died: 14 December 1624 (aged 87–88)
- Noble family: Howard-Effingham
- Spouses: Catherine Carey; Margaret Stuart
- Issue: Lady Frances Howard; William Howard, 3rd Baron Howard of Effingham; Charles Howard, 2nd Earl of Nottingham; Charles Howard, 3rd Earl of Nottingham; Lady Margaret Howard; Elizabeth Howard, Countess of Carrick; Lady Anne Howard
- Father: William Howard, 1st Baron Howard of Effingham
- Mother: Margaret Gamage
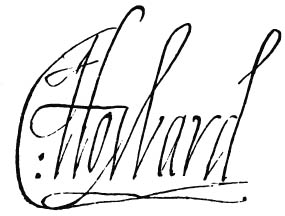
- Signature

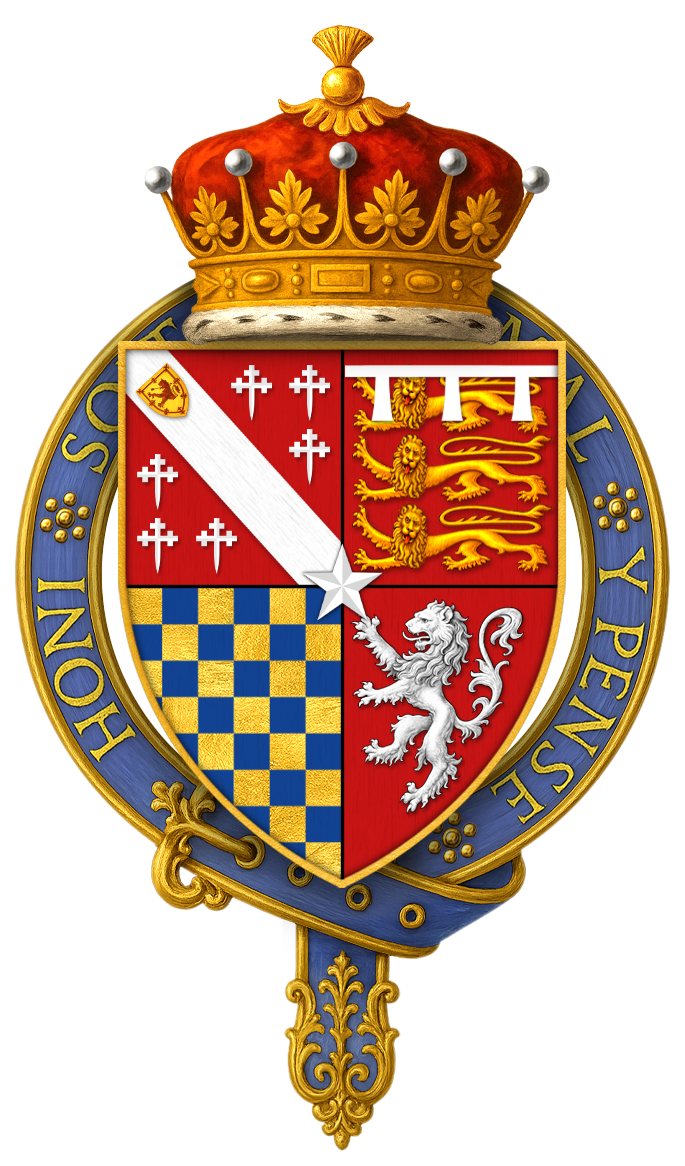
Arms of Sir Charles Howard, 1st Earl of Nottingham, KG

Charles Howard, 1st Earl of Nottingham, 2nd Baron Howard of Effingham, KG (1536 – 14 December 1624), known as Lord Howard of Effingham, was an English statesman and Lord High Admiral under Elizabeth I and James I. He commanded the English fleet against the Spanish Armada in 1588 and was chiefly credited with securing the victory that safeguarded England from invasion by the Spanish Empire. According to Britannica, "Although he was not as talented a seaman as his subordinates Sir Francis Drake and John Hawkins, Howard's able leadership contributed greatly to this important English victory."

== Early life: 1536–1558 ==
Few details of Charles Howard's early life are known. He was born in 1536, and was the cousin of Queen Elizabeth. He was son of William Howard, 1st Baron Howard of Effingham (c. 1510–1573) and Margaret Gamage (d. 18 May 1581), daughter of Sir Thomas Gamage. He was a grandson of Thomas Howard, 2nd Duke of Norfolk. He was also the cousin of Anne Boleyn (Anne's mother was half-sister to Charles' father), and held several prominent posts during the reign of Anne's daughter, Elizabeth I.

It is believed that Charles Howard was taught French and some Latin at the house of his uncle, the 3rd Duke of Norfolk. He was also educated in penmanship, chivalric exercises, and some legal traditions. He served as a page to his cousin Thomas who later became the 4th Duke of Norfolk. He also fished and hunted fervently throughout his life.

In his childhood he was educated by John Foxe, the famous Protestant martyrologist and tutor in charge of the education of the children of Henry Howard, Earl of Surrey, a first cousin of Charles who was executed for treason in January 1547. During that time Howard lived with his cousins at Reigate Castle, one of the estates belonging to his uncle, the 3rd Duke of Norfolk.

Howard served at sea under his father's command as a youth. In 1552, he was sent to France to become well-educated in the French language, but was soon brought back to England at the request of his father because of questionable or unexpected treatment.

== Early political career: 1558–1585 ==
Howard went to the peace negotiations between England and France which led to the Treaty of Câteau-Cambrésis of 1559. He personally informed Queen Elizabeth of its ratification.

He served as ambassador to France in 1559. In December 1562, he became the keeper of the Queen's house and park at Oatlands. In his early years he and five other gentlemen bore the canopy of state when Queen Elizabeth opened her second Parliament on 11 January 1563. He is recorded as having been a regular participant in jousts and tournaments, but despite his relationship to the Queen it is said that it took some time before he was able to gain any personal benefit from his situation.

Howard was also a member of the House of Commons, representing Surrey in the Parliament of 1563 and again in 1572.

In 1564 he became a member of Gray's Inn, and received his Master of Arts degree at Cambridge in 1571. This was not because he had any legal ambitions, but because it was the normal thing for men of his status to do.

He served as General of the Horse in 1569 and was involved that year in the suppression of the Catholic rebellion in northern England. He commanded a squadron of ships escorting the Queen of Spain on a state visit in 1570.

Howard was knighted in 1572, and then became Lord Howard of Effingham following his father's death in 1573. From 1576 to 1603 he was patron of a playing company, Nottingham's Men, later called the Admiral's Men.

On 3 April 1575, Howard was elected to the Order of the Garter to replace his cousin, Thomas Howard, 4th Duke of Norfolk, who had been executed in 1572. He was installed at Windsor on 8 May 1575.

== Lord High Admiral: 1585–1619 ==
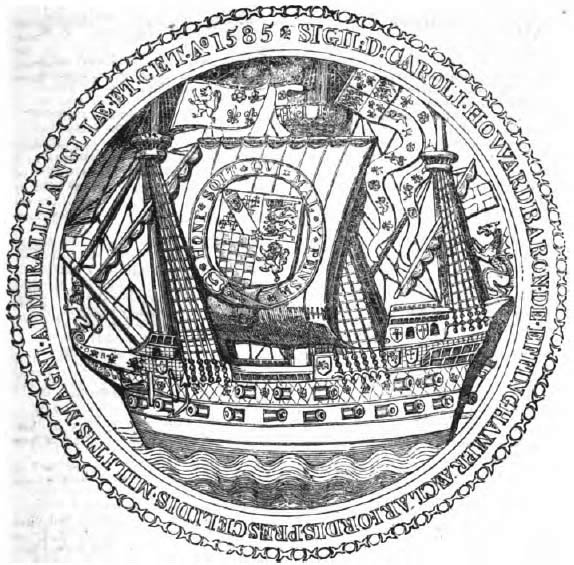
Seal dating from 1585.

Howard was named Lord High Admiral in 1585. The French ambassador wrote to Sir Francis Walsingham, saying Elizabeth's appointment of Howard was "a choice worthy of her virtue and prudence and very necessary for the Admiralty. I pray you tell her that the King [of France] has written to me by an express to thank her for having elected so good an admiral, from whom he hopes great things for the peace of his subjects".

=== Trial and execution of Mary, Queen of Scots: 1587 ===
Howard regularly attended the Privy Council during the Babington Plot. He was named as one of the commissioners to try Mary, Queen of Scots but is not subsequently mentioned as one of those who sat on the trial. William Davison later alleged that Howard spoke to Elizabeth on 1 February 1587 "of the great danger she continually lived in" as there were rumours of new plots against her life and spoke of the stories that Mary had escaped from prison. Elizabeth was "moved by his lordship to have some more regard to the surety of herself and the state than she seemed to take" and finally made up her mind, telling Howard to send for Davison and Mary's death warrant. Howard then met Davison and informed him that Elizabeth was now "fully resolved" and ordered him to bring forth the warrant to be signed, "that it might be forthwith despatched and deferred no longer". Elizabeth would later blame Davison for breaking orders that no-one must be told of what had happened. The Privy Council met the next day and decided to take responsibility for the execution of Mary.

=== Spanish Armada: 1588 ===
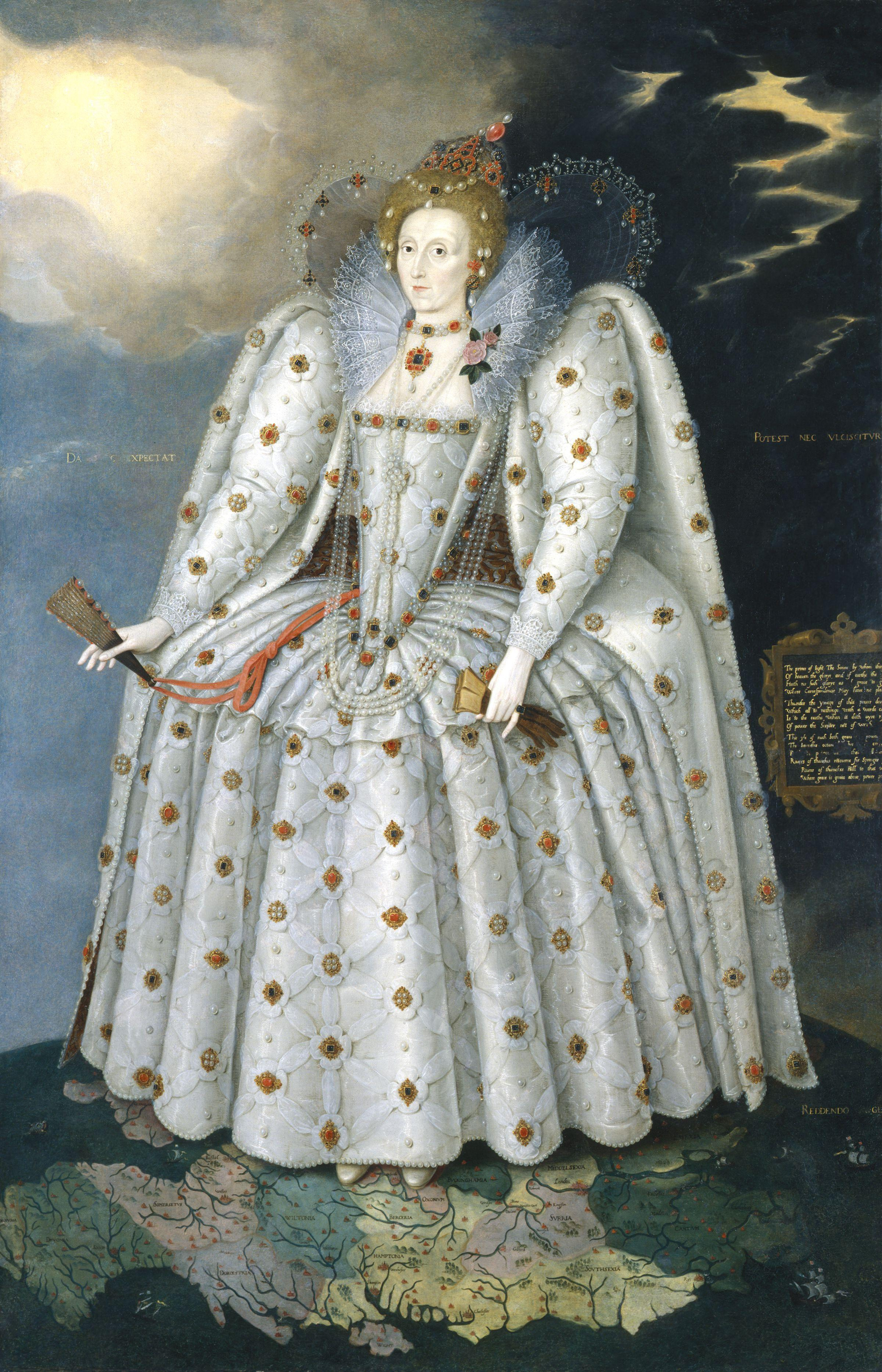
Queen Elizabeth I by Marcus Gheeraerts the Younger (1592).

In early December 1587 orders were drawn up for Howard to take the English fleet to sea. On 21 December Howard's commission was signed, requiring Howard "according as there shall be occasion, and wherever and whenever he shall deem it fitting, to invade, enter, spoil and make himself master of the kingdoms, dominions, lands, islands, and all other places whatever belonging to the said Spaniards". He was furthermore given full authority over the navy and army at sea.

Between 15 December and 1 April 1588 he sat on the Privy Council only four times and attended court briefly every five or six days to meet with Walsingham. Writing on 27 January 1588, Howard believed the peace negotiations with Spain were a trap and expressed his dismay in a letter to Walsingham:

I have made of the French King, the Scottish King, and the King of Spain, a Trinity that I mean never to trust to be saved by; and I would others were, in that, of my opinion. Sir, there was never, since England was England, such a stratagem and mask made to deceive England withal as this is of the treaty of peace. I pray God we have not cause to remember one thing that was made of the Scots by the Englishmen; that we do not curse for this a long grey beard with a white head, witless, that will make all the world think us heartless. You know whom I mean.

The next day he wrote again to Walsingham that if there was going to be a "surcease of arms" then "it shall be but folly and to no purpose for me to lie here" as if he was in arms whilst Elizabeth was negotiating peace it would make him "a jest to many, and they have reason". Peace negotiations continued until the Armada was sailing for England.

On 1 February Howard wrote to Walsingham: "It doth appear no less by your letter but that we may assure ourselves that Scotland is the mark which they shoot at to offend us, and therefore most necessary to provide for that...for my own part, had rather be drawn in pieces with wild horses than that they should pass through Scotland and I lie here".

On 14 February, Howard again wrote to Walsingham that Elizabeth would be "no good housewife for herself" if she refused to grant James VI a pension for his support for England rather than Spain. Howard wrote on 21 February: "I have been aboard every ship that goeth out with me, and in every place where any may creep, and I do thank God that they be in the estate they be in; and there is never a one of them that knows what a leak means...there is none that goeth out now but I durst go to the Rio de la Plata in her". On 29 February he wrote to Burghley:

I doubt not but to make her Majesty a good account of anything that shall be done by the Spanish forces, and I will make him wish his galleys at home again. If the Commissioners bring peace it is the happiest thing that can be; but if they come without it, look for great matters to ensue presently upon it; for the charge is so great that the King is at, both in Spain and here, in the Low Countries, that is cannot continue long, if he had five times the treasure he hath...I protest before God, and as my soul shall answer for it, that I think there were never in any place in the world worthier ships than these are, for so many. And as few as we are, if the King of Spain's forces be not hundreds, we will make good sport with them.

By 28 May, Howard was at Plymouth. On that day he wrote to Burghley: "My good Lord, there is here the gallantest company of captains, soldiers, and mariners that I think ever was seen in England". Two days later the Spanish Armada sailed from Lisbon but was forced back into port by bad winds. On 14 June, Howard wrote to Walsingham that the "surest way to meet with the Spanish fleet is upon their own [coast], or in any harbour of their own, and there to defeat them...I wish with all my heart that King Anthony were with us, that he might set foot in his own country, and find the King occupied there, which we might easily do". The next day he wrote again to Walsingham:

We would go on the coast of Spain; and therefore our ground was first, to look to that principal; and if we found they did but linger on their own coast, or that they were put into the Isles of Bayona or the Groyne, then we thought in all men's judgments that be of experience here, it had been most fit to have sought some good way, and the surest we could devise, by the good protection of God, to have defeated them...And if her Majesty do think that she is able to detract time with the King of Spain, she is greatly deceived; which may breed her great peril. For this abusing [of] the treaty of peace doth plainly show how the King of Spain will have all things perfect, [as] his plot is laid, before he will proceed to execute...Whether this [may] not breed most great danger and dishonour, I leave it to her Majesty's wisdom; but if it should fall out so, I would I had never been born...And if [we] were to-morrow next on the coast of Spain, I would not land in any place to offend any; but they should well perceive that we came not to spoil, but to seek out the great force to fight with them; and so should they have known by message...But I must and will obey.

On 19 June Howard wrote that: "You see it is very likely to come to pass, my opinion that I always had of the French King; as also of the treacherous treaty of peace, which was never to any other end but that the King of Spain might have time, and not be troubled in gathering his forces together...persuade her Majesty that she lose no more time in taking care enough of herself, and to make herself, every way that is possible, as strong as she can; for there is no question but the King of Spain hath engaged his honour to the uttermost in this, for the overthrow of her Majesty and this realm...if he be put back from this year, her Majesty may have a good and honourable peace. If not, yet she shall be sure he shall not be able to trouble her Majesty in many years after".

Howard wrote to Elizabeth on 23 June: "For the love of Jesus Christ, Madam, awake thoroughly, and see the villainous treasons round about you, against your Majesty and your realm, and draw your forces round about you, like a might prince, to defend you". On the same day he said to Burghley: "We must not lose one hour of time...Let her Majesty trust no more to Judas' kisses; for let her assure herself there is no trust to French King nor Duke of Parma. Let her defend herself like a noble and mighty prince, and trust to her sword and not to their word, and then she need not fear, for her good God will defend her".

On 19 July Howard received the news that the Armada had been seen off Lizard Point, Cornwall. Two days later he wrote to Walsingham:

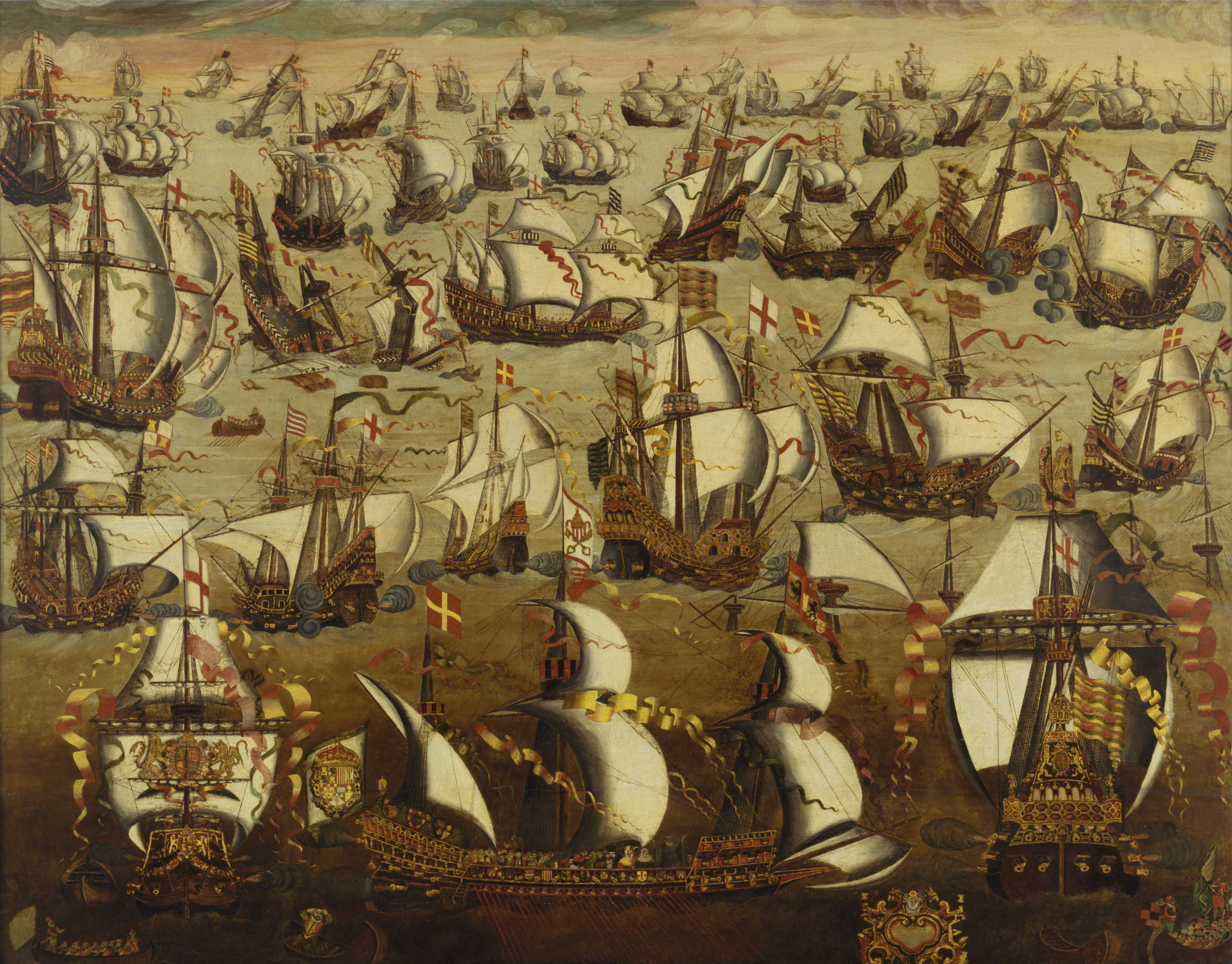
The Spanish Armada.

...whereupon, although the wind was very scant, we first warped out of harbour that night, and upon Saturday turned out very hardly, the wind being at South-West; and about three of the clock in the afternoon, descried the Spanish fleet, and did what we could to work for the wind, which [by this] morning we had recovered, descrying their f[leet to] consist of 120 sail, whereof there are 4 g[alleasses] and many ships of great burden. At nine of the [clock] we gave them fight, which continued until one. [In this] fight we made some of them to bear room to stop their leaks; notwithstanding we durst not adventure to put in among them, their fleet being so strong. But there shall be nothing either neglected or unhazarded, that may work their overthrow. Sir, the captains in her Majesty's ships have behaved themselves most bravely and like men.

On 29 July Howard wrote to Walsingham: "Their force is wonderful great and strong; and yet we pluck their feathers by little and little. I pray to God that the forces on the land be strong enough to answer so present a force".

On 7 August he updated Walsingham:

In our last fight with the enemy before Gravelines, the 29th July, we sank three of their ships and made four to go room with the shore so leak as they were not able to live at sea. After that fight, notwithstanding that our powder and shot was well near all spent, we set on a brag countenance and have them chase, as though we had wanted nothing, until we had cleared our own coast and some part of Scotland of them. And then...we made for the Frith, and sent certain pinnaces to dog the fleet until they should be past the Isles of Scotland, which I verily believe they are left at their sterns ere this...I must thank you for your favourable using of my brother Hoby. He telleth me how forwards you were to further all things for our wants. I would some were of your mind. If we had had that which had been sent, England and her Majesty had had the most honour that ever any nation had. But God be thanked; it is well.

The next day he wrote to Walsingham to say he was in Margate and that "although we have put the Spanish fleet past the Frith, and I think past the Isles, yet God knoweth whether they go either to the Nase of Norway or into Denmark or to the Isles of Orkney to refresh themselves, and so to return; for I think they dare not return with this dishonour and shame to their King, and overthrow their Pope's credit. Sir, sure bind, sure find. A kingdom is a great wager...Some made little account of the Spanish force by sea; but I do warrant you, all the world never saw such a force as theirs was; and some Spaniards that we have taken, that were in the fight at Lepanto, do say that the worst of our fights that we have had with them did exceed far the fight they had there". On 9 August Howard wrote that he believed the Armada would return because "they dare not go back with this dishonour and shame; for we have marvellously plucked them".

The day after he wrote to Burghley: "Sickness and mortality begins wonderfully to grow amongst us; and it is a most pitiful sight to see...how the men, having no place to receive them into here, die in the streets. I am driven myself, of force, to come a-land, to see them bestowed in some lodging; and the best I can get is barns and such outhouses; and the relief is small that I can provide for them here. It would grieve any man's heart to see them that have served so valiantly to die so miserably". Howard wrote to Lord Winchester on 15 August: "Whereas the Ryall of Weymouth hath served in her Majesty's service of late against the Spaniards, in defence of religion, our prince and country, for the space of one month, wherein she and her company have performed their duties very well, and that now, in reward of their good service, they look for payment and satisfaction". Furthermore, Howard requested that Winchester "and the rest of the justices of your shire, to cause an estimate to be first taken of the powder, shot, victuals and other charges of pay, and such like; and afterwards to cause the sum to be levied by equal contributions, as shall seem good to your Lordship and the rest, out of your shire of Dorset; and therewith to reward and satisfy the good service of the said ship and company".

In late August Howard wrote to Elizabeth, the Privy Council and Walsingham of the terrible sickness that had spread throughout the fleet. On 29 August he informed Walsingham: "There is not any of them that hath one day's victuals, and many [of them] have sent many sick men ashore here, and not one penny to relieve them...It were too pitiful to have men starve after such a service. I know her Majesty would not, for any good. Therefore I had rather open the Queen's Majesty's purse something to relieve them, than they should be in that extremity; for we are to look to have more of these services; and if men should not be cared for better than to let them starve and die miserably, we should very hardly get man to serve. Sir, I desire [but] that there may be but double allowance of but as much as I [give] out of my own purse, and yet I am not the ablest man in [the realm]; but, before God, I had rather have never penny in the world than they should lack". In December Howard wrote to Burghley: "...there hath grown a surcharge unto her Majesty of 623l. 10s. 11d. in this late service, by reason of certain extraordinary kinds of victuals, as wine, cider, sugar, oil, and certain fish, provided and distributed amongst the ships at Plymouth by my order, and Sir Francis Drake's, which was done as well to relieve such men withal as by reason of sickness or being hurt in fight".

Howard commissioned the Italian writer Petruccio Ubaldini to write a chronicle on the defeat of the Armada. He also commissioned a Flemish artist, Hendrick Cornelisz Vroom, to make a series of tapestries on the Armada, based on Augustine Ryther's engravings. These tapestries were for many years at Howard's London home and he sold them to James I to help pay for debts. In 1650 they were displayed in the House of Lords where they remained until destroyed by fire in October 1834. However they can still be seen in John Pine's 1739 publication of The Tapestry Hangings of the House of Lords.

=== Cádiz expedition: 1596 ===
Howard was created Earl of Nottingham in 1596 and was appointed Lord Lieutenant General of England [a unique and unprecedented title] in 1599. In 1596, when another Spanish invasion was feared, Howard was again appointed to defend England. Howard and the Earl of Essex jointly led an attack against the Spanish base at Cádiz on 20 June.

=== 3rd Spanish Armada ===
During the Spanish armada of 1597, Essex was sent home in disgrace after the failed Azores Voyage having left the English coast unguarded. Adverse winds frustrated the Spanish fleet however and the English fleet was able to return safely. Howard took charge and sent out the fleet to intercept the Spanish and one of the ships captured a flyboat from which information was given about the Armada and its retreat back to Spanish ports. Howard was rewarded soon after by the Queen and was created Earl of Nottingham.

=== Trial and execution of the Earl of Essex: 1601 ===
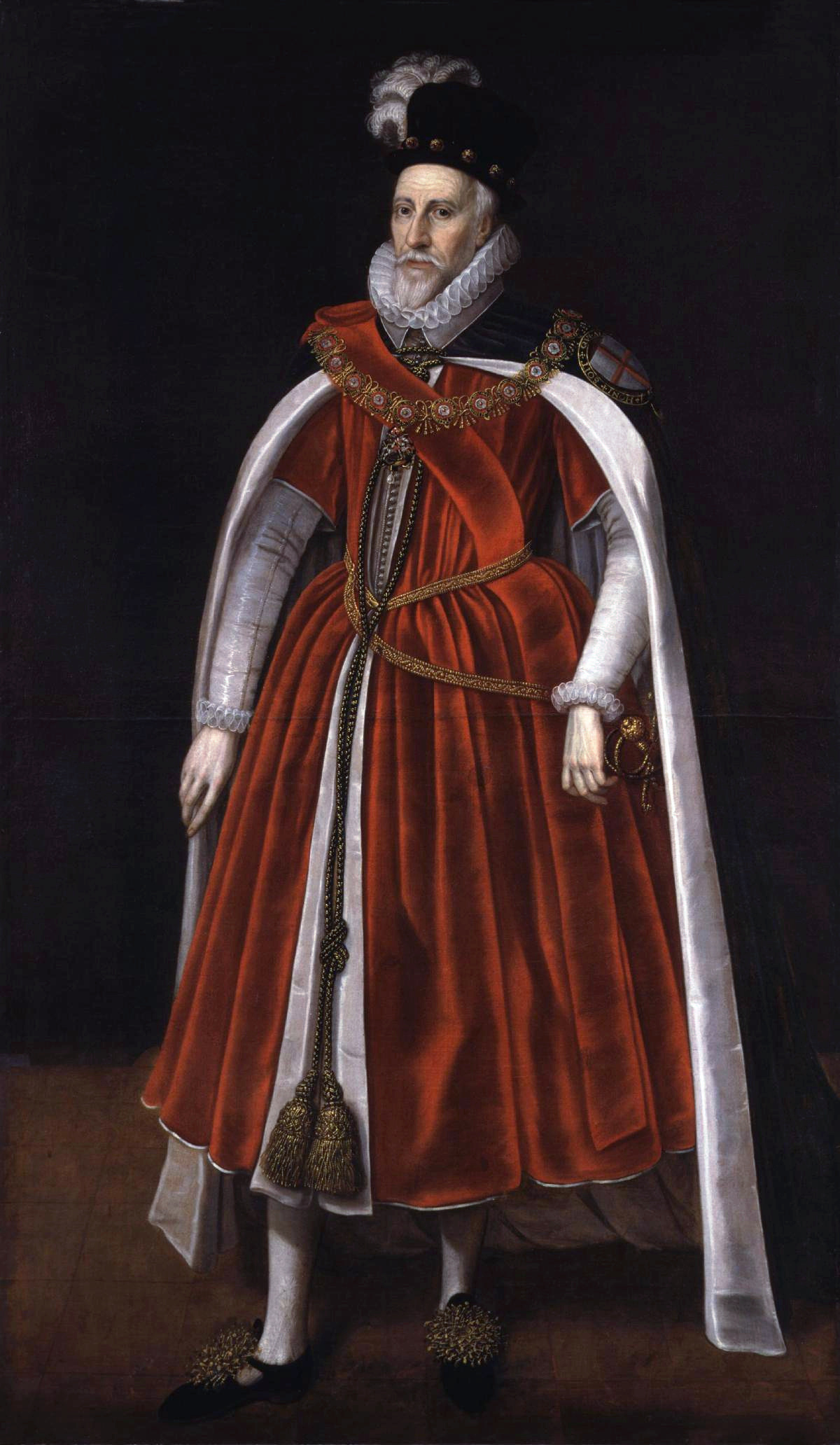
Charles Howard, 1st Earl of Nottingham, by unknown artist (1602).

When Essex rebelled in 1601, Howard took command of the soldiers massed to defend London and defeated him in the field. Howard served as a commissioner at Essex's trial and examined him at least once.

=== Death of Elizabeth I: 1603 ===
The death of Howard's wife affected Elizabeth; she remained in "a deep melancholy, with conceit of her own death", complaining "of many infirmities suddenly to have overtaken her". Howard was at Elizabeth's deathbed and pressed her on the succession, receiving Elizabeth's reply that it should be "our cousin of Scotland". Elizabeth died on 24 March.

=== Reign of James I ===
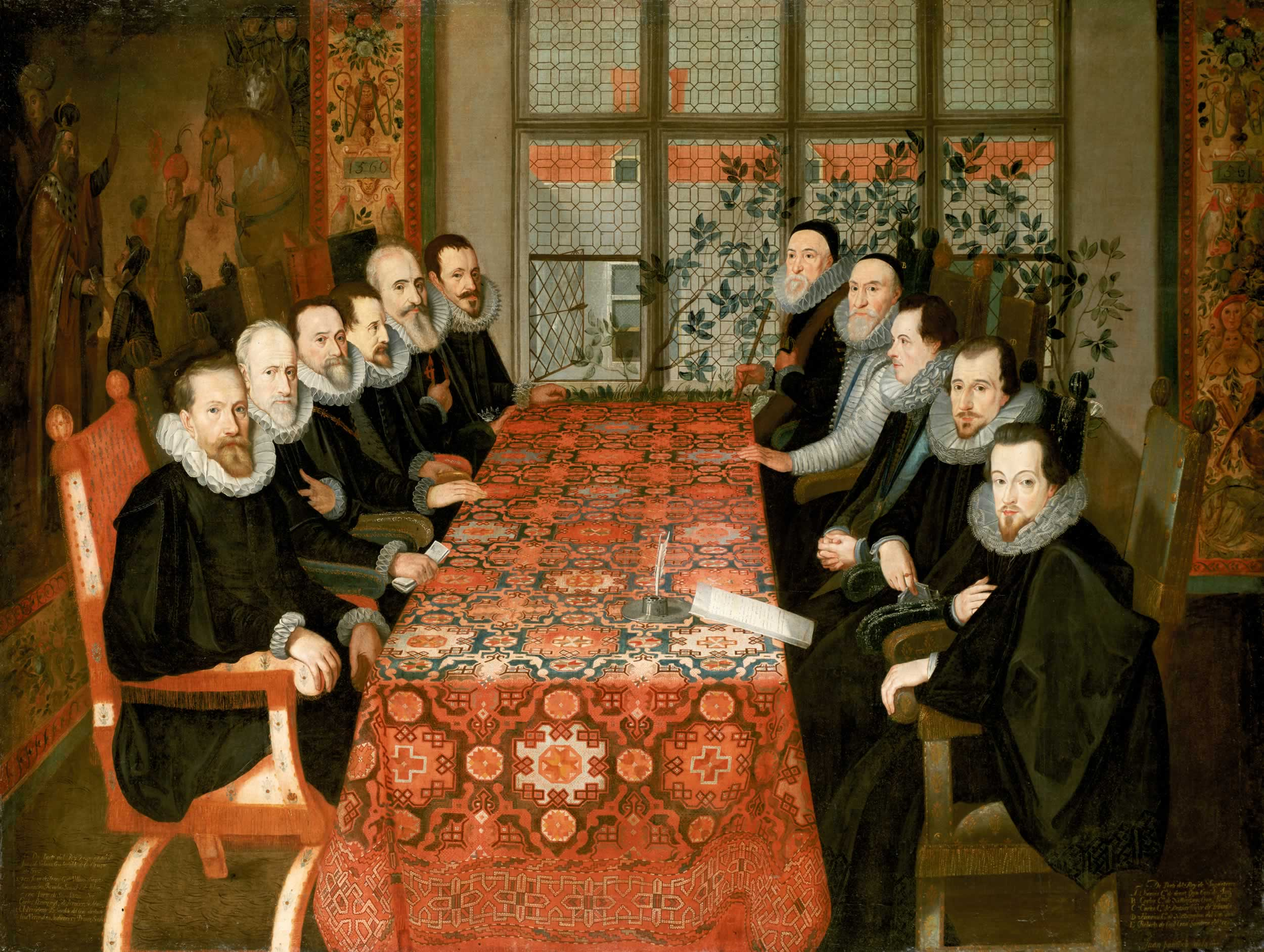
The Somerset House Conference representatives, 19 August 1604. Howard is seated on the right, second nearest to the window. Henry Howard, Earl of Northampton, Charles' cousin, is seated second from the right in the same row

Nottingham served as Lord High Steward at the coronation of the new king, James I. The king appointed Howard to the English delegation that negotiated the peace treaty with Spain, and the subsequent ratification of the treaty at Valladolid. He presented a diamond jewel depicting the Habsburg emblems of the double eagle and golden fleece to Margaret of Austria, Queen of Spain in Madrid. The King of Spain, Philip III gave him a diamond and gold feather jewel for his hat, a gold collar set with diamonds, and other jewellery and gilt plate, with gifts for his sons, his wife Margaret Stewart. His retinue in Spain including seven trumpeters and eight musicians.

Howard served on the commission of union between England and Scotland and served as commissioner at the Gunpowder Plot trial in 1605.

== Later life: 1619–1624 ==
Howard died in 1624 at the age of 88. None of his three sons (two of whom succeeded him in the earldom) left heirs, and shortly after the last died the Nottingham earldom was recreated for a close relative of the Earl of Winchilsea; the Howard of Effingham barony passed to descendants of his brother, the Earl of Effingham being the modern heir.

== Legacy ==
William Bourne dedicated his 1578 book Inventions or Devices. Very Necessary for all Generalles and Captaines, as wel by Sea as by Land to Howard and Robert Norman dedicated to Howard his 1584 translations of two Dutch guides to North Sea coastlines. Richard Hakluyt's 1598 edition of The Principall Navigations, Voiages, and Discoveries of the English Nation was also dedicated to Howard.

During a debate on the American Revolutionary War in the House of Lords on 18 November 1777, Henry Howard, 12th Earl of Suffolk (a descendant of Howard) defended the war against the American colonists. Lord Chatham in response made his appeal:

From the tapestry that adorns these walls, the immortal ancestor of this noble Lord frowns with indignation at THE DISGRACE OF HIS COUNTRY! In vain he led your victorious fleets against the boasted Armada of Spain; in vain he defended and established the honour, the liberties, the religion, the Protestant religion of his country, against the arbitrary cruelties of Popery and the Inquisition.

HMS Effingham, a Hawkins Class cruiser was commissioned by the Royal Navy in 1925. All five ships of the class where named in honor of elizibethan captain and privateers, namely Sir John Hawkins, Sir Walter Raleigh, Sir Martin Frobisher, Sir Thomas Cavendish

Effingham has often been identified with the character Marinell from Edmund Spenser's The Faerie Queene. He is one of the principal characters in the opera Roberto Devereux by Gaetano Donizetti, though referred to inaccurately as the "Duke of Nottingham".

There is now a mixed comprehensive school, Howard of Effingham School, named after him. It is located in the village of Effingham in Surrey. He was portrayed by John Shrapnel in the film Elizabeth: The Golden Age. The site of his estate in south Croydon is now the location of Whitgift School.

== Children ==
He was married first to Catherine Carey, daughter of Henry Carey, 1st Baron Hunsdon and Ann Morgan. They had five children:

- Frances Howard (buried 11 July 1628). She was married first to Henry FitzGerald, 12th Earl of Kildare. She was secondly married to Henry Brooke, 11th Baron Cobham.
- William Howard, 3rd Baron Howard of Effingham (27 December 1577 – 28 November 1615). Summoned to the Lords as 3rd Baron Howard of Effingham. He was married on 7 February 1596/1597 to Anne St John.
- Charles Howard, 2nd Earl of Nottingham (17 September 1579 – 3 October 1642). He was married first on 19 May 1597 to Charity White (d. 18 December 1618), daughter to Robert White. Secondly on 22 April 1620 to Mary Cokayne, daughter of Sir William Cokayne, who served as Lord Mayor of London in 1619 and Mary Morris.
- Margaret Howard, married in 1587 Sir Richard Leveson, no issue.
- Elizabeth Howard (buried 31 March 1646). Maid of honour to Elizabeth I of England. She was married first to Sir Robert Southwell. One of their daughters, Elizabeth, was a lover and eventually a third wife of Robert Dudley (explorer). Another daughter, Frances, married Edward Rodney. Elizabeth Howard was secondly married to John Stewart, 1st Earl of Carrick.

He was married secondly to Margaret Stuart, daughter of James Stuart, 2nd Earl of Moray and Elizabeth Stuart, 2nd Countess of Moray. She was more than 50 years younger than he was. They had two children:

- Charles Howard, 3rd Earl of Nottingham (1610–1681)
- Anne Howard (born c. 1612). She was married on 29 December 1627 to Alexander Stewart, Baron Garlies, son of Alexander Stewart, 1st Earl of Galloway and Grizel Gordon.

== Notes ==
Honorary titles
Preceded by The Earl of Lincoln	Custos Rotulorum of Surrey; 1585–1618	Succeeded by Sir Edward Howard
Preceded by Unknown	Lord Lieutenant of Surrey jointly with The Earl of Nottingham 1621–1624; 1585–1624	Succeeded by The Earl of Nottingham; The Earl of Holderness
Political offices
Preceded by The Earl of Lincoln	Lord High Admiral; 1585–1619	Succeeded by The Duke of Buckingham
Preceded by The Marquess of Winchester	Lord Steward; 1603–1618	Succeeded by The Duke of Lennox
Legal offices
Preceded by The Lord Hunsdon	Justice in Eyre south of the Trent; 1597–1624	Succeeded by The Duke of Buckingham
Peerage of England
New creation	Earl of Nottingham; 6th creation 1596–1624	Succeeded by Charles Howard
Preceded by William Howard	Baron Howard of Effingham (descended by acceleration); 1573–1603	Succeeded by William Howard
Preceded by William Howard	Baron Howard of Effingham; 1615–1624	Succeeded by Charles Howard
