= Charles Howard, 2nd Earl of Nottingham =

The Earl of Nottingham
- Born: 17 September 1579
- Died: 3 October 1642 (aged 63)
- Noble family: Howard-Effingham
- Spouses: Charity White; Mary Cokayne
- Father: Charles Howard, 1st Earl of Nottingham
- Mother: Catherine Carey

Charles Howard, 2nd Earl of Nottingham (17 September 1579 – 3 October 1642) of Effingham, Surrey, was the second (but eldest surviving) son of Charles Howard, 1st Earl of Nottingham. His mother was the former Catherine Carey. From 1615 to 1624 he was styled Lord Howard of Effingham before he succeeding his father in the latter year as 2nd Earl of Nottingham.

He was a Member of Parliament five times between 1597 and 1614, for Bletchingley and for Surrey in 1597, for Sussex in 1601 and 1604 and for New Shoreham in the Addled Parliament of 1614. He was knighted in 1603 and later appointed Vice-Admiral of Sussex for life.

He was married first on 19 May 1597 to Charity White (d. 18 December 1618), daughter to Robert White and secondly, on 22 April 1620, to Mary Cokayne, daughter of Sir William Cockayne, Lord Mayor of London in 1619. There were no known children from either marriage and he was therefore succeeded by his half-brother, Charles Howard, 3rd Earl of Nottingham.

The senior school in Effingham, Surrey, the Howard of Effingham School, is named after him.

Political offices
Preceded by Charles Howard, 1st Earl of Nottingham	Lord Lieutenant of Surrey jointly with Charles Howard, 1st Earl of Nottingham 1621–1624; The Earl of Holderness 1624–1626; The Viscount Wimbledon 1627–1638; The Earl of Arundel 1635–1642; Lord Maltravers 1636–1642; 1621–1642	English Interregnum
Peerage of England
Preceded by Charles Howard	Earl of Nottingham; 6th creation 1624–1642	Succeeded by Charles Howard
