= St. Aldhelm's Church =

St. Aldhelm's Church or St Aldhelm's Church or any variation thereof may refer to:

== England ==
- St Aldhelm's Church, Poole, Dorset
- St Aldhelm's Church, Radipole, Dorset
- St Aldhelm's Church, Boveridge, Dorset
- St Aldhelm's Church, Doulting, Somerset
- St Aldhelm's Church, Lytchett Heath, Dorset
- St Aldhelm's Church, Belchalwell, Dorset
- St Aldhelm's Roman Catholic Church, Malmesbury, Wiltshire
- St. Aldhelm's Chapel, St. Aldhelm's Head, Dorset
- Church of St Aldhelm and St Eadburgha, Broadway, Somerset
