= Epistola ad Geruntium =

The Epistola ad Geruntium ("Epistle to Gerunt") is a letter written by Aldhelm, abbot of Malmesbury to Geraint, King of Dumnonia, in the late 7th or early 8th century. The letter concerns disagreements between Roman Catholic and Celtic Christianity that were discussed by the Council of Hereford.

== Letter ==
The manuscript is uniquely preserved in the Codex Vindobonensis 751, in the papers of Lul, archbishop of Mainz, who was an alumnus of Malmesbury. According to Bede, Aldhelm also wrote a book on the same topic, by which he "led many of the Britons who were subject to the West Saxons to adopt the Catholic celebration of Easter and of our Lord". It is not known whether the Bede's mention of the "remarkable book" refers to the surviving letter or a different, lost work. William of Malmesbury (Gesta pontificum Anglorum p. 361) thought it had been destroyed by the Britons.

In the letter, Aldhelm raises two specific criticisms of the Celtic Christian then being practiced in Geraint's kingdom:

- The adoption of the petrine tonsure
- The dating of Easter

Geraint's clergy did not celebrate the Catholic Easter as decreed by the Council of Nicaea, despite this receiving papal mandate. In short, Aldhelm's reasoning was that any such people could not be considered part of the Orthodox church. As Finberg observes, 'there is an undertone of implication' as to the consequences should the Dumnonians fail to take appropriate action.

== See also ==
- Carmen Rhythmicum
