= Aldhelm =

English Bishop and saint (c. 639 - 709)

Saint Aldhelm O.S.B.
- Bishop of Sherborne, Abbot of Malmesbury Abbey
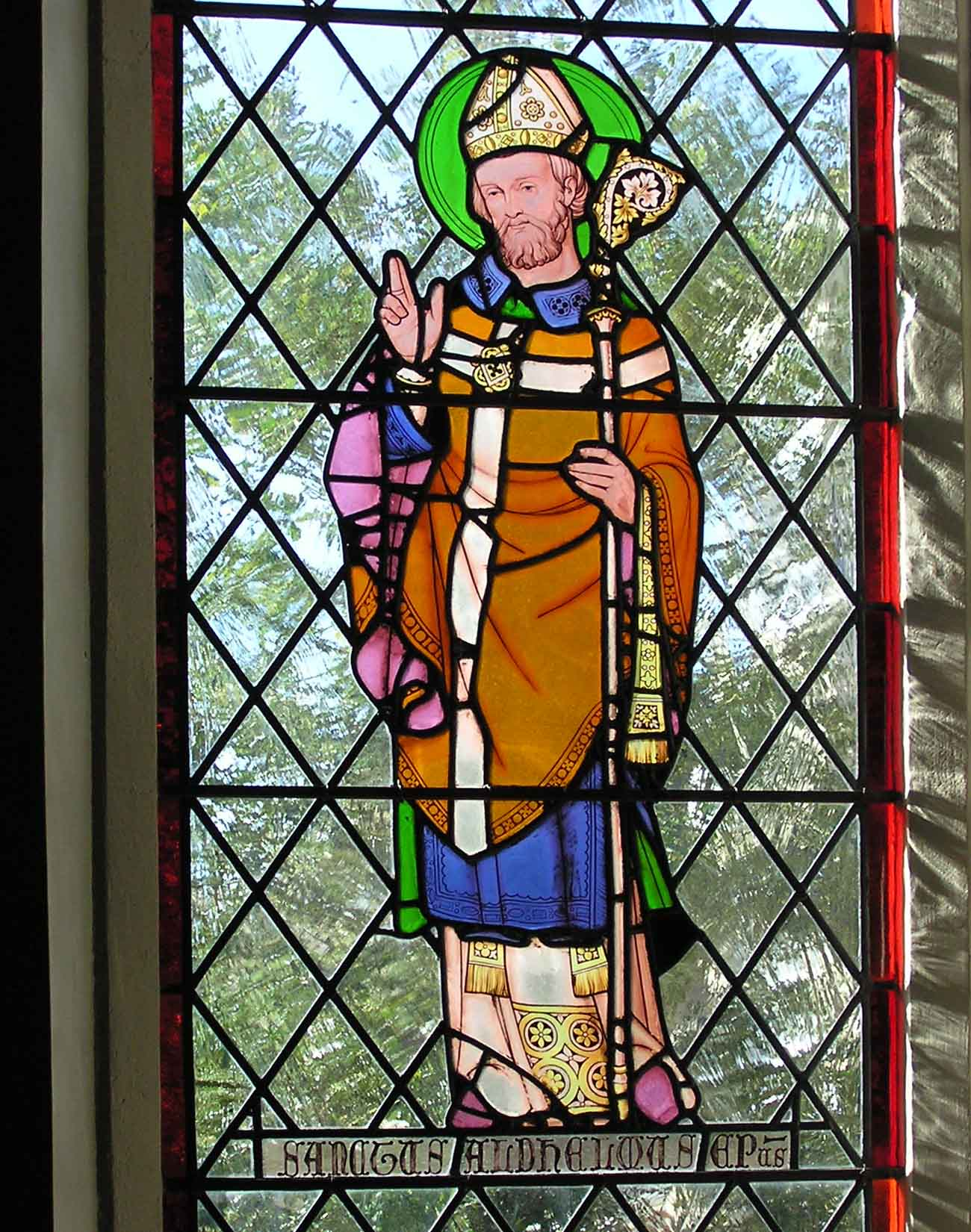
- Stained glass window showing Aldhelm, installed in St Aldhelm's Church, Malmesbury
- Church: Catholic Church
- Diocese: Sherborne
- Successor: Forthhere
- Other post: Abbot of Malmesbury (675–705)

Personal details
- Born: c. 639 Wessex
- Died: 25 May 709 Doulting, Somerset

Sainthood
- Feast day: 25 May
- Venerated in: Catholic Church; Eastern Orthodox Church; Anglican Communion
- Canonized: Pre-Congregation
- Attributes: Monk playing a harp; or bishop with staff sprouting ash leaves
- Patronage: Malmesbury; Sherborne; musicians; songwriters
- Shrines: Malmesbury Abbey (now destroyed)

Aldhelm (Old English: Ealdhelm, Latin: Aldhelmus Malmesberiensis; c. 639 – 25 May 709), Abbot of Malmesbury Abbey, Bishop of Sherborne, and a writer and scholar of Latin poetry, was born before the middle of the 7th century. He is said to have been the son of Kenten, who was of the royal house of Wessex. He was certainly not, as his early biographer Faritius asserts, the brother of King Ine. After his death he was venerated as a saint, his feast day being the day of his death, 25 May.

== Life ==
=== Early life and education ===
Aldhelm received his first education in the school of the Irish scholar and monk Máeldub (also Maildubh, Maildulf or Meldun) (died c. 675), who had settled in the British stronghold of Bladon (or Bladow) on the site of the town called Mailduberi, Maldubesburg, Meldunesburg, etc., and finally Malmesbury, after him.

In 668, Pope Vitalian sent Theodore of Tarsus to be Archbishop of Canterbury. At the same time the North African scholar Hadrian became abbot of St Augustine's at Canterbury. Aldhelm was one of his disciples, for he addresses him as the 'venerable preceptor of my rude childhood.' He must, nevertheless, have been thirty years of age when he began to study with Hadrian. His studies included Roman law, astronomy, astrology, the art of reckoning and the difficulties of the calendar. He learned, according to the doubtful statements of the early lives, both Greek and Hebrew. He certainly introduces many Latinized Greek words into his works.

Ill health compelled Aldhelm to leave Canterbury and he returned to Malmesbury Abbey, where he was a monk under Máeldub for fourteen years, dating probably from 661 and including the period of his studies with Hadrian.

=== Abbot of Malmesbury ===
When Máeldub died, Aldhelm was appointed in 675, according to a charter of doubtful authenticity cited by William of Malmesbury, by Leuthere, Bishop of Winchester (671–676), to succeed to the direction of the monastery, of which he became the first abbot.

Aldhelm introduced the Benedictine rule and secured the right of the election of the abbot by the monks themselves. The community at Malmesbury increased, and Aldhelm was able to found two other monasteries as centres of learning, at Frome, Somerset and at Bradford-on-Avon, Wiltshire. Following a pilgrimage to Rome, he was given permission by Pope Sergius I in a Papal Bull of 701 to establish the monastery at Frome, where he had already built a church circa 685. The Anglo-Saxon building of St Laurence's Church, Bradford-on-Avon dates back to his time, and may safely be regarded as his. At Malmesbury he built a new church to replace Máeldub's modest building, and obtained considerable grants of land for the monastery. Aldhelm held this post until circa 705 when he became Bishop of Sherborne.

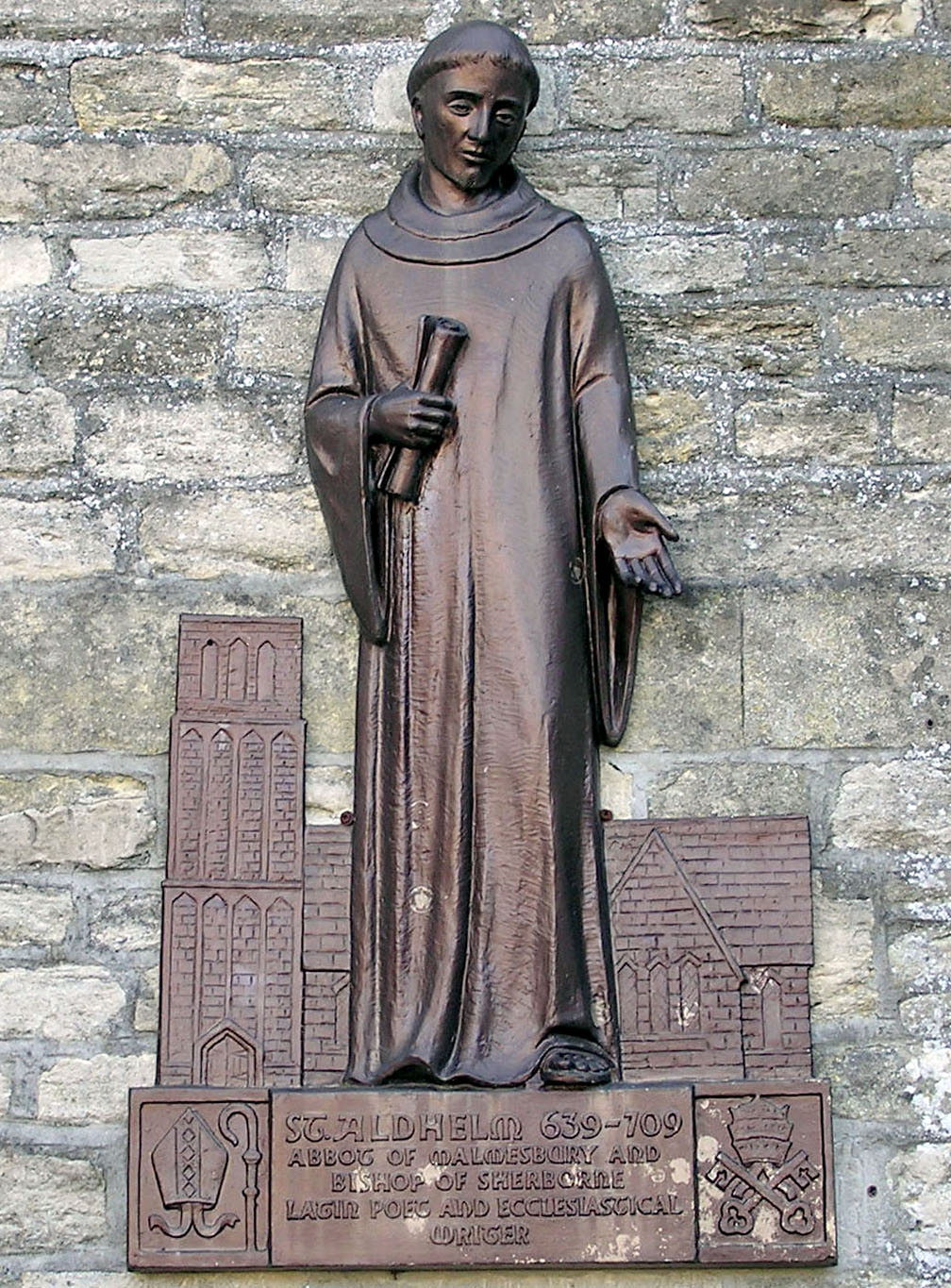
Wall plaque at St Aldhelm's Catholic Church, Malmesbury. The inscription says 'St Aldhelm 639–709, Abbot of Malmesbury and Bishop of Sherborne, Latin Poet and Ecclesiastical Writer.'

=== Easter controversy ===
Aldhelm was deputed by a synod of the church in Wessex to remonstrate with the Britons of Dumnonia (Devon and Cornwall) on the Easter controversy. British Christians followed a unique system of calculation for the date of Easter and also bore a distinctive tonsure; these customs are generally associated with the practice known as Celtic Christianity. Aldhelm wrote a long and rather acrimonious letter to king Geraint of Dumnonia (Geruntius) achieving ultimate agreement with Rome. Aldhelm also personally visited Devon & Cornwall about this time, potentially on a diplomatic mission, which he recounts in his Carmen Rhythmicum.

=== Bishop of Sherborne ===
In 705, or perhaps earlier, Hædde, Bishop of Winchester, died, and the diocese was divided into two parts. Sherborne was the new see, of which Aldhelm became the first bishop around 705. He wished to resign from the abbey of Malmesbury which he had governed for thirty years, but yielding to the remonstrances of the monks he continued to direct it until his death. He was now an old man, but he showed great activity in his new functions. The cathedral church which he built at Sherborne, though replaced later by a Norman church, is described by William of Malmesbury. In his capacity as bishop, he displayed a great deal of energy. This included going into public places where he would sing hymns and passages from the gospels interspersed with bits of clowning to draw attention to his message.

=== Organ ===
Rogers has Aldhelm claiming to have built an innovative organ, "a mighty instrument, with innumerable tones, blown with belows, and enclosed in a gilded case." (It is not clear from the source cited whether the device was innovative for the premises, the locale, or a fundamental advance on existing known technologies.)

=== Death and veneration ===
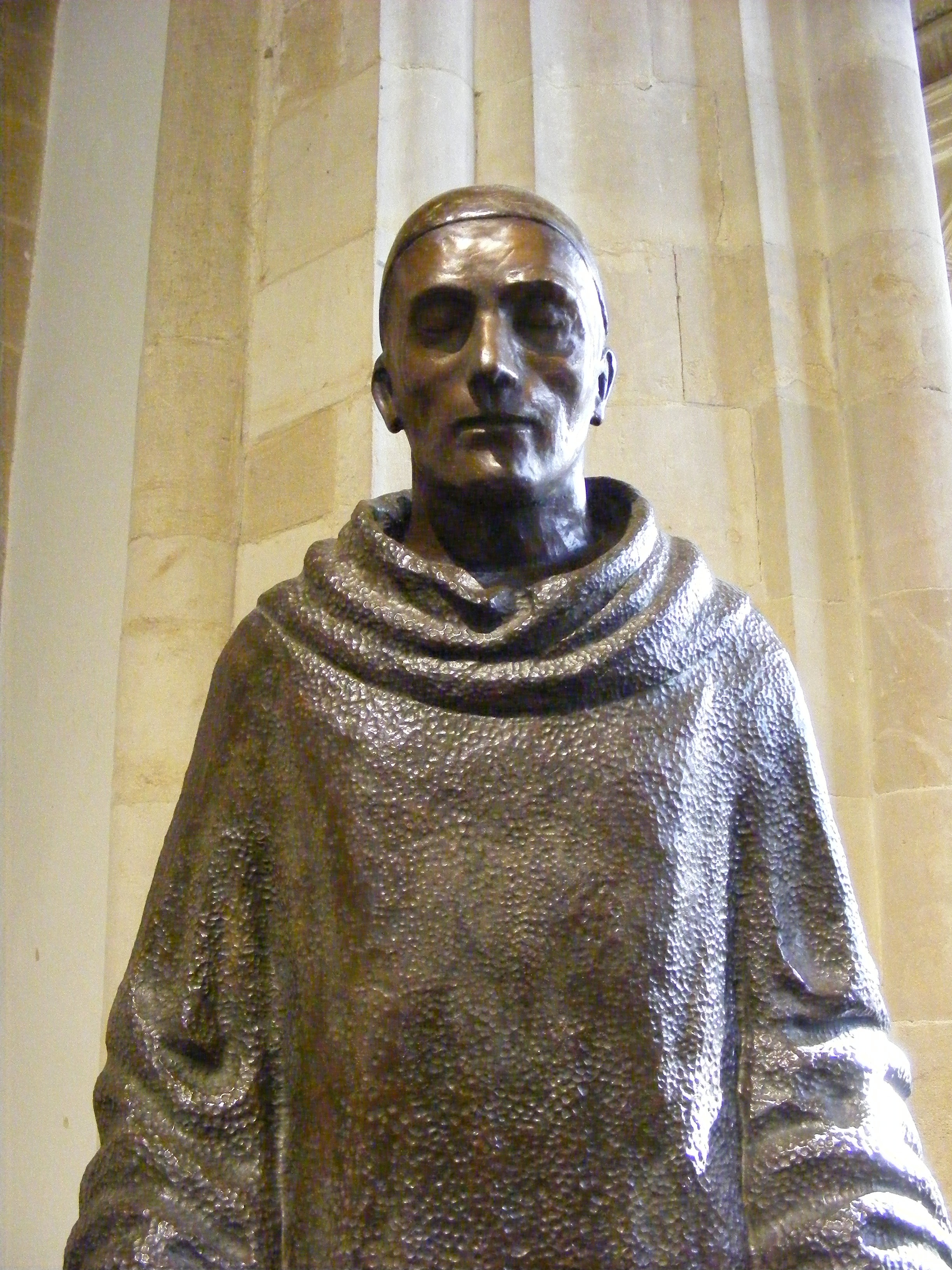
Conceptual statue of St Aldhelm in Sherborne Abbey by Marzia Colonna

Aldhelm was on his rounds in his diocese when he died at the church in Doulting village in 709, the Church of St Aldhelm and St Aldhelm's Well in the village are dedicated to him. The body was taken to Malmesbury, and crosses were set up by his friend, Egwin, Bishop of Worcester, at the various stopping-places. He was buried in the church of St Michael at Malmesbury Abbey. His biographers relate miracles due to his sanctity worked during his lifetime and at his shrine. The cape in Dorset commonly known as St Alban's Head is more properly called St. Aldhelm's Head in his honour.

Aldhelm was revered as a saint after his death, with his feast day being celebrated on 25 May. His relics were translated in 980 by Dunstan, the Archbishop of Canterbury. He is commemorated by a statue in niche 124 of the West Front of Salisbury Cathedral. There is also a statue in Sherborne Abbey of Aldhelm, created in 2004 by Marzia Colonna.

Flag of Saint Aldhelm

Aldhelm's flag may be flown in his celebration. The flag, a white cross on a red background, is a colour reversed version of England's St. George flag.

Aldhelm is remembered in the Church of England with a commemoration on 25 May.

In 2023, a pastoral area of the Roman Catholic Diocese of Clifton was named in honour of Aldhelm.

== Writings ==
Aldhelm's collected works were edited by Rudolf Ehwald, Aldhelmi opera (Berlin, 1919). An earlier edition by J. A. Giles, Patres eccl. Angl. (Oxford, 1844) was reprinted by J. P. Migne in his Patrologiae Cursus, vol. 89 (1850).

=== Contemporary reputation ===
Aldhelm's fame as a scholar spread to other countries. Artwil, the son of an Irish king, submitted his writings for Aldhelm's approval, and Cellanus, an Irish monk from Peronne, was one of his correspondents. Aldhelm was the first Anglo-Saxon, so far as is known, to write in Latin verse, and his letter to Acircius (Aldfrith or Eadfrith, king of Northumbria) is a treatise on Latin prosody for the use of his countrymen. In this work he included his most famous productions, one hundred and one riddles in Latin hexameters. Each of them is a complete picture, and one of them, De creatura, runs to 83 lines.

That Aldhelm's merits as a scholar were early recognised in his own country is shown by the encomium of Bede (Historia ecclesiastica gentis Anglorum 5.18), who speaks of him as a wonder of erudition. His fame reached Italy, and at the request of Pope Sergius I he paid a visit to Rome, of which, however, there is no notice in his extant writings. On his return, bringing with him privileges for his monastery and a magnificent altar, he received a popular ovation.

Aldhelm wrote in elaborate, grandiloquent and very difficult Latin, known as hermeneutic style. This verborum garrulitas shows the influence of Irish models and became England's dominant Latin style for centuries, though eventually it came to be regarded as barbarous. His works became standard school texts in monastic schools, until his influence declined around the time of the Norman Conquest.

=== Modern reputation ===
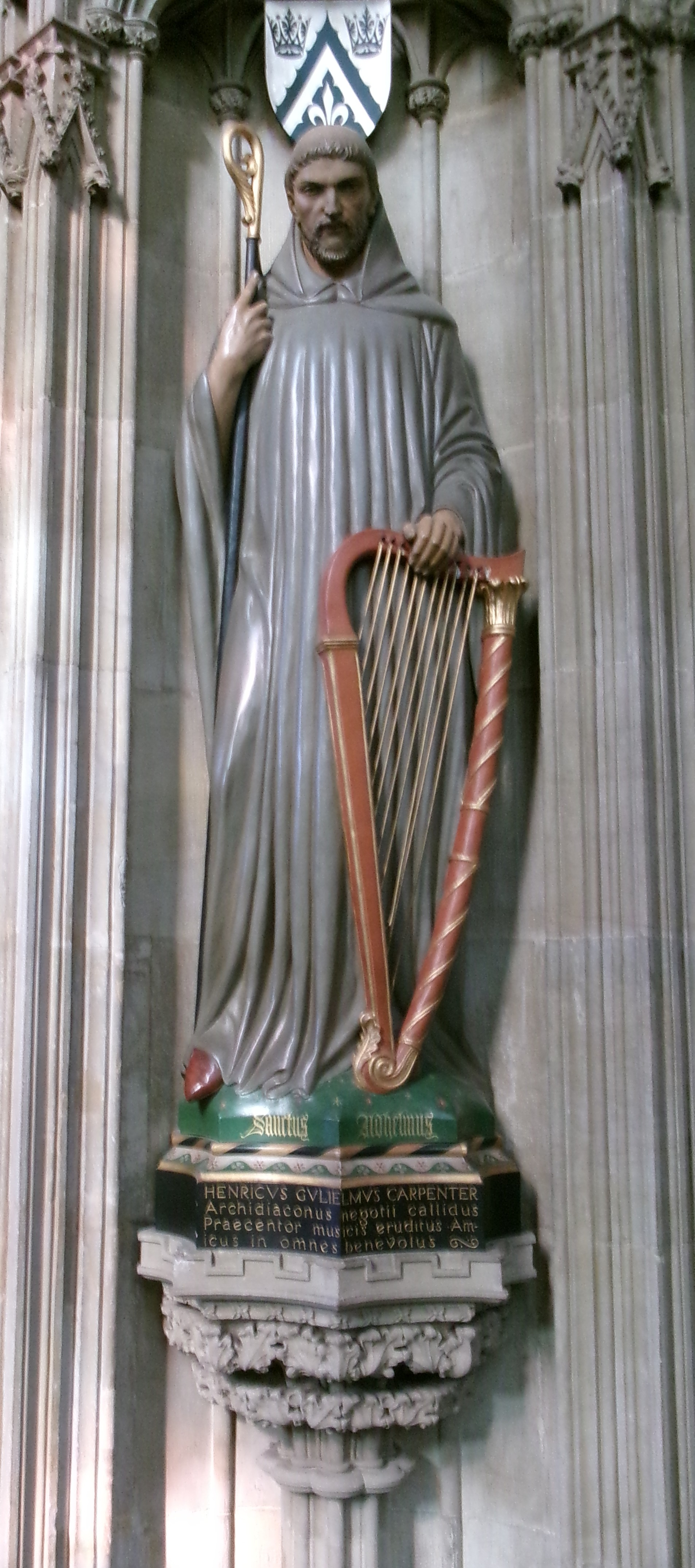
Statue of Aldhelm in Salisbury Cathedral

Modern historians have contrasting views of his writings. Peter Hunter Blair compares him unfavourably to Bede: "In the mind of his older contemporary, Aldhelm, learning of equal depth produced little more than an extravagant form of intellectual curiosity...Like Bede he drank deeply from the streams of Irish and Mediterranean scholarship, but their waters produced in him a state of intellectual intoxication which delighted its beholders, but which left little to posterity." However, Michael Lapidge praises his immense learning, observing that his knowledge of Latin texts is greater than any other pre-Conquest Anglo-Saxon writer, and that "the originality and importance of his corpus of Latin writings well justifies his status as the first English man of letters".

=== Prose ===
- De Laude Virginitatis (the prose De Virginitate), a Latin treatise on virginity addressed to the nuns of the double monastery at Barking, is Aldhelm's best-known work. After a long preface extolling the merits of virginity, he commemorates a great number of male and female saints. Aldhelm later wrote a shorter, poetic version (see below).
- Epistola ad Acircium, a Latin treatise dedicated to one Acircius, understood to be King Aldfrith of Northumbria (r. 685-704/5). The chief source of his Epistola ad Acircium (ed. A. Mai, Class. Auct. vol. V) is Priscian. The acrostic introduction gives the sentence, 'Aldhelmus cecinit millenis versibus odas,' whether read from the initial or final letters of the lines. After an address to King Aldfrith, the letter consists of three treatises:
  - De septenario, treatise on the number seven in arithmology
  - De metris, treatise on metre, including the Enigmata (see below).
  - De pedum regulis, didactive treatise on metrical feet, such as iambs and spondees.
- Epistola ad Geruntium, a letter written in Latin to Geraint, King of Dumnonia concerning articles of the Council of Hertford. It was supposed to have been destroyed by the Britons (William of Malmesbury, Gesta pontificum Anglorum p. 361), but was discovered with others of Aldhelm's in the correspondence of St Boniface, archbishop of Mainz.
- Other Letters. Correspondents include Bishop Leuthere, Hadrian, Eahfrid, Cellanus, Sergius and Aldhelm's pupils Wihtfrith and Æthelwald who was responsible for part of the Carmen Rhythmicum.
  - A long letter to Eahfrid, a scholar just returned from Ireland (first printed in Usher, Veterum Epistt. Hiber. Sylloge, 1632), is of interest as casting light on the relations between English and Irish scholars.

=== Poetry ===
- Carmen de virginitate (the poetic De Virginitate). Aldhelm wrote a shorter, poetic version of De Laude Virginitatis, which closes with a battle of the virtues against the vices, the De octo principalibus vitiis (first printed by Delrio, Mainz, 1601). The two works are what is sometimes called an opus geminatum or "twin work".
- Carmen Rhythmicum, rhythmic poem which describes a travel through western England and the way a wooden church was affected by a storm.
- Carmina ecclesiastica (modern title), i.e. a number of Latin tituli designed for inscription on a church or altar. They are: (1) In Basilica Sanctorum Petri et Pauli, for a church dedicated to St Peter and St Paul, possibly the church which Aldhelm founded at Malmesbury, (2) In Basilica Beatae Mariae Semper Virginis, St Mary's Church, possibly also at Malmesbury, (3) In Ecclesia Mariae a Bugge Extructa, for the church built by Bugga, that is Eadburh of Minster-in-Thanet, a royal lady of the house of Wessex, (4) the twelve tituli known collectively as In Duodecim Apostolorum Aris and (5) In sancti Matthiae Apostoli Ecclesia.
- Aenigmata, one hundred riddles included in the Epistola ad Acircium.

=== Lost works ===
According to William of Malmesbury, Aldhelm also wrote poetry in Old English and set his own compositions to music, but none of his songs, which were still popular in the time of Alfred, have survived. Finding his people slow to come to church, he is said to have stood at the end of a bridge singing songs in the vernacular, thus collecting a crowd to listen to exhortations on sacred subjects.

== Churches dedicated to St Aldhelm ==
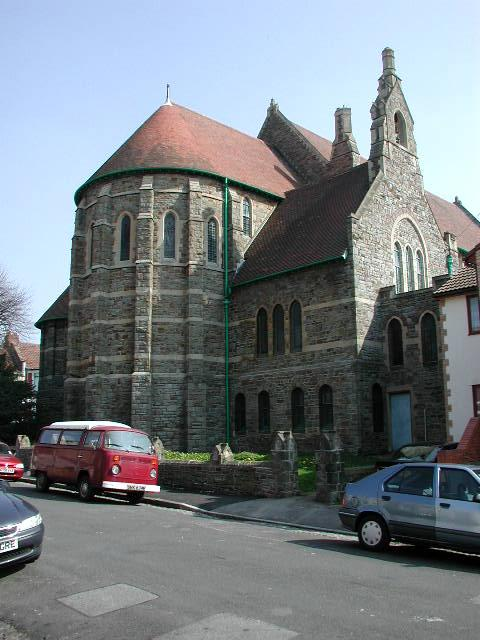
Bedminster, Bristol

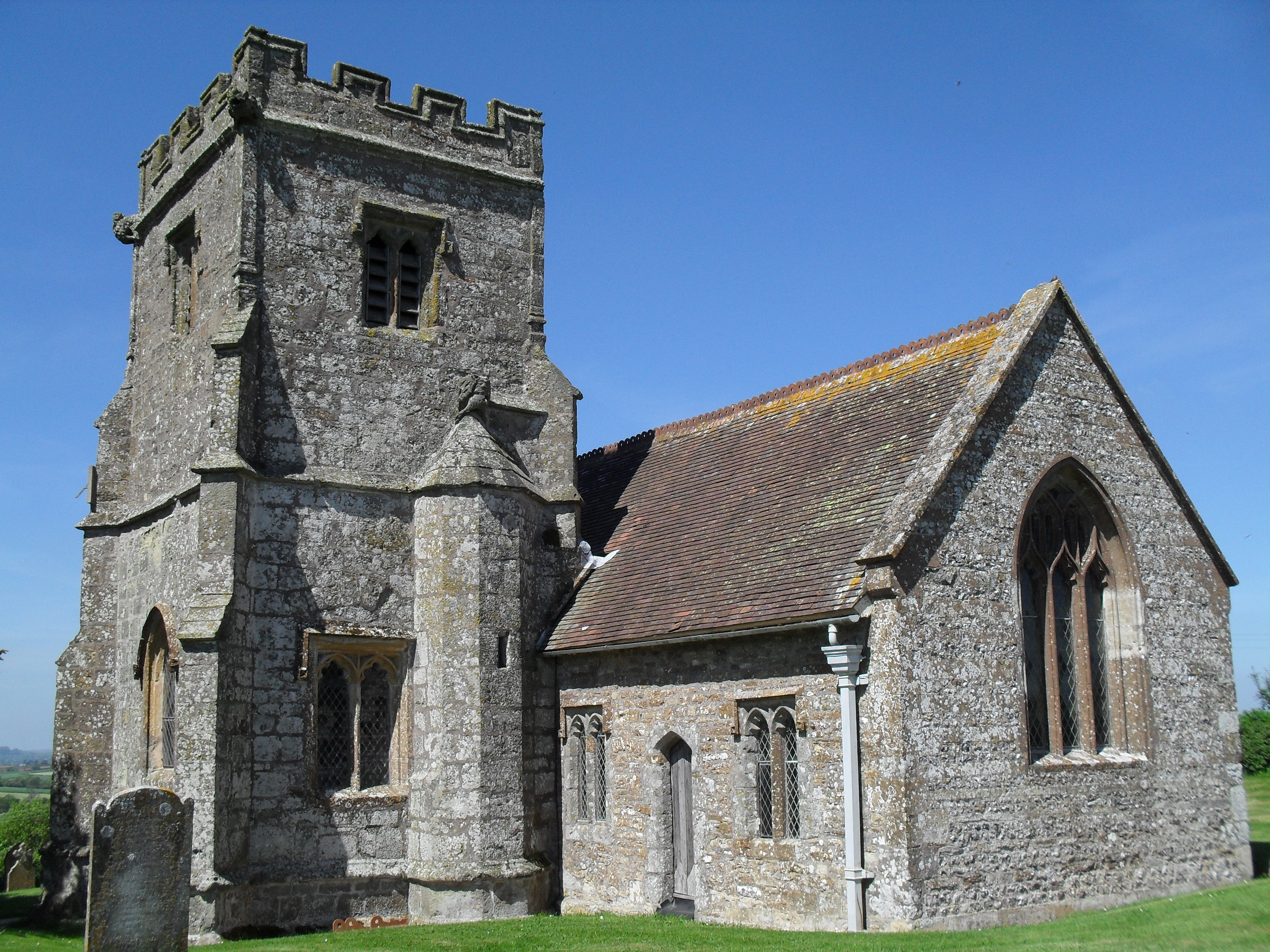
St Aldhelm's Church, Belchalwell, Dorset

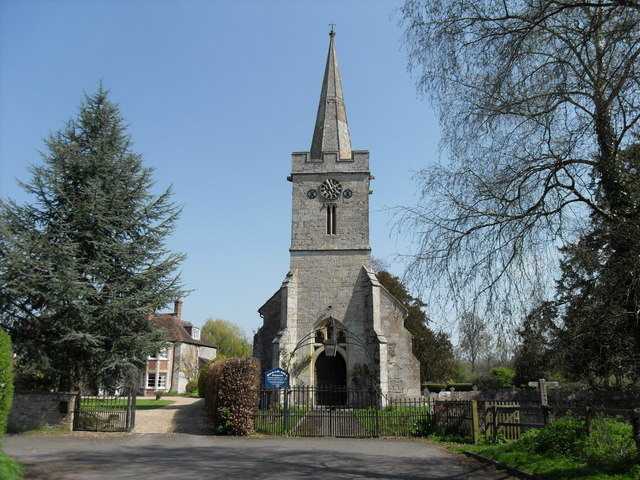
Bishopstrow, Wiltshire

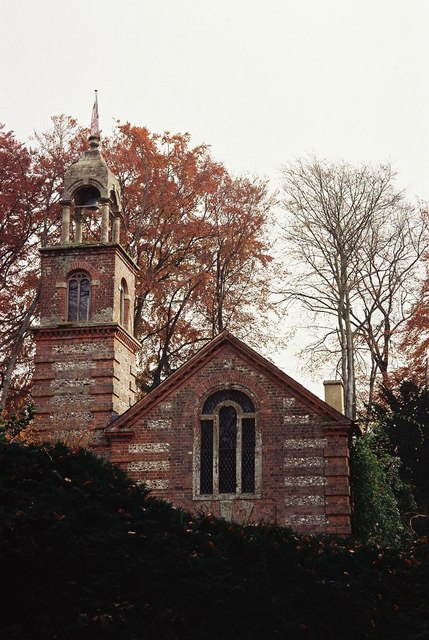
St Aldhelm's Church, Boveridge, Dorset

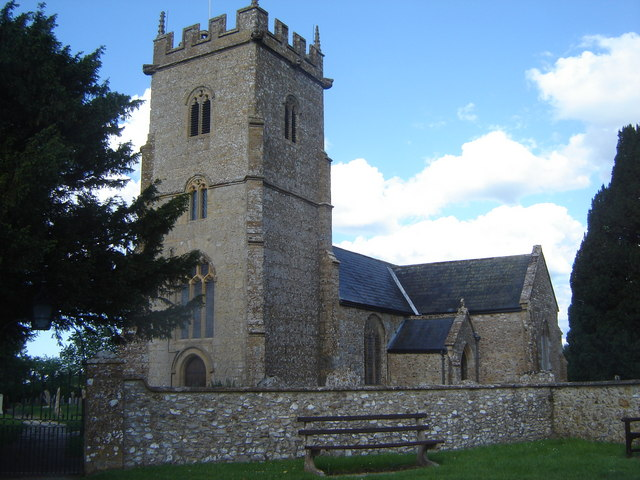
Church of St Aldhelm and St Eadburgha, Broadway, Somerset

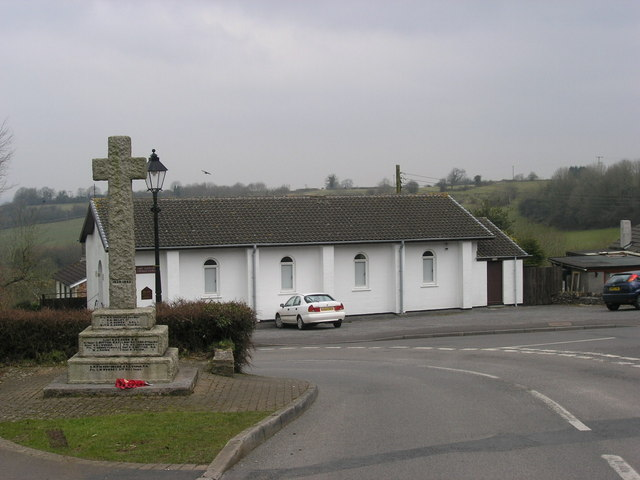
Chilcompton, Somerset

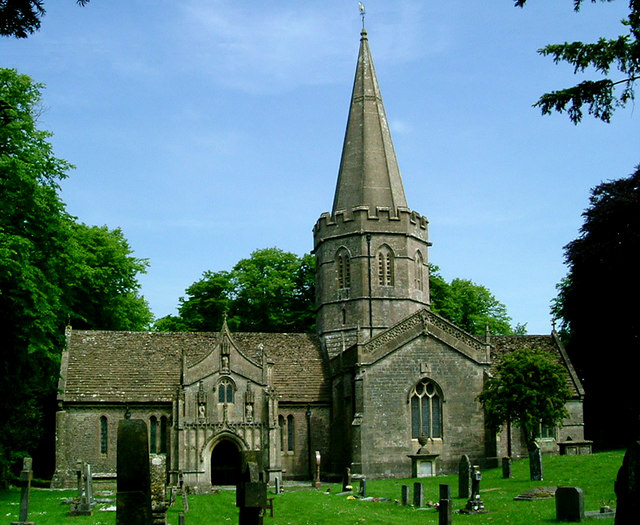
Church of St Aldhelm, Doulting, Somerset

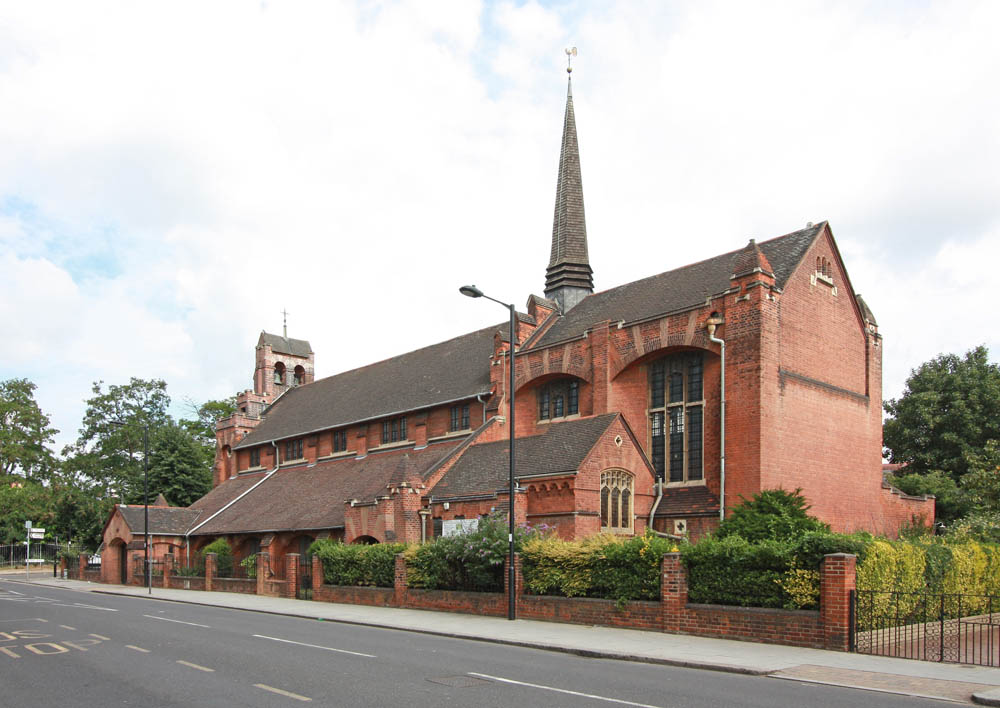
Edmonton, London

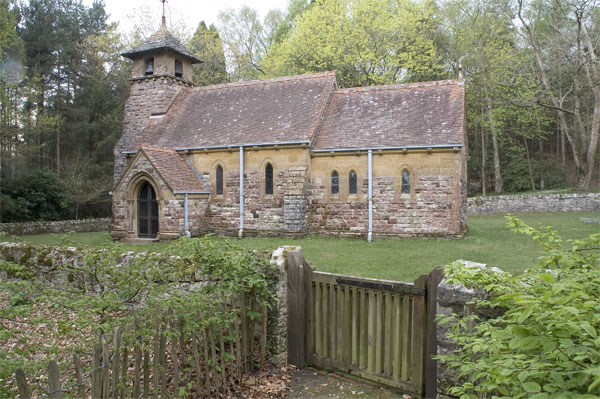
St Aldhelm's Church, Lytchett Heath, Dorset

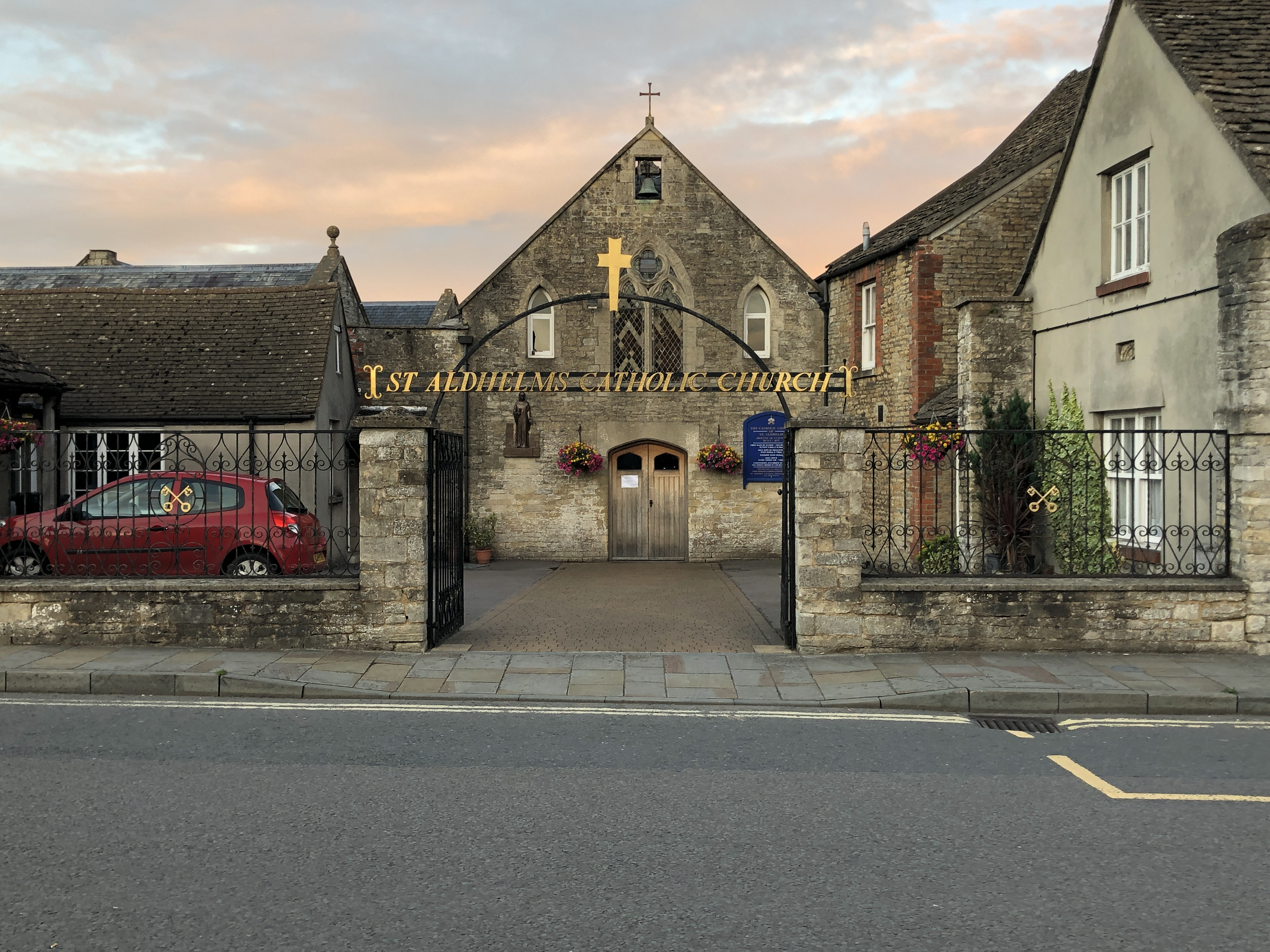
St Aldhelm's Church, Malmesbury, Wiltshire

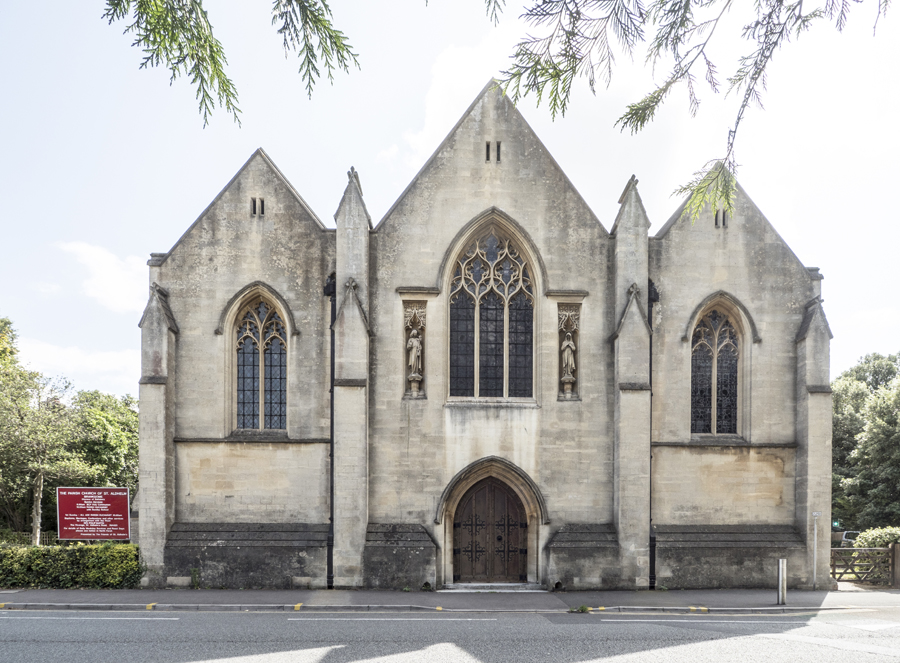
St Aldhelm's Church, Poole

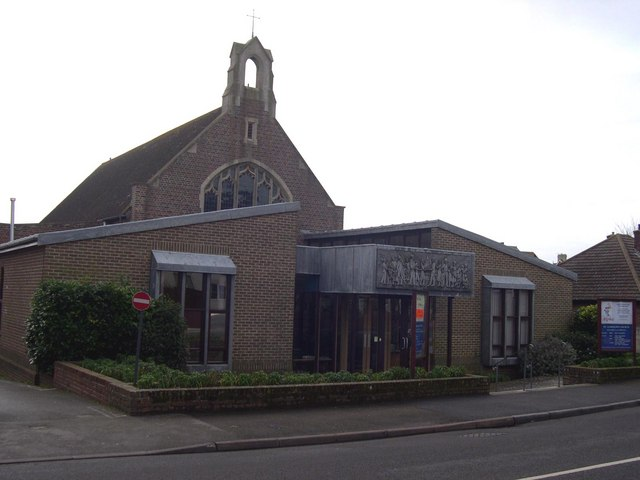
St Aldhelm's Church, Radipole, Dorset

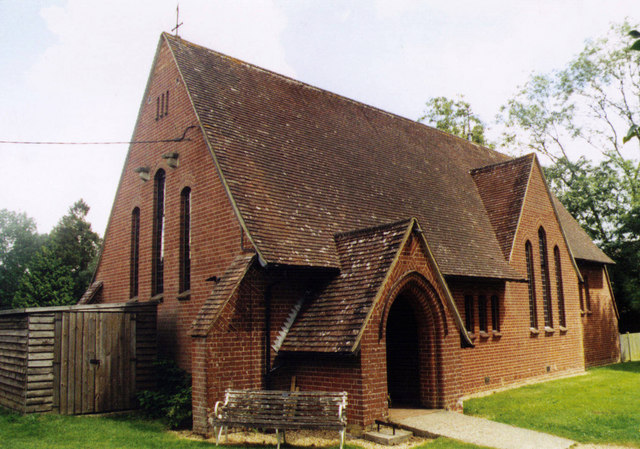
Sandleheath, Hampshire

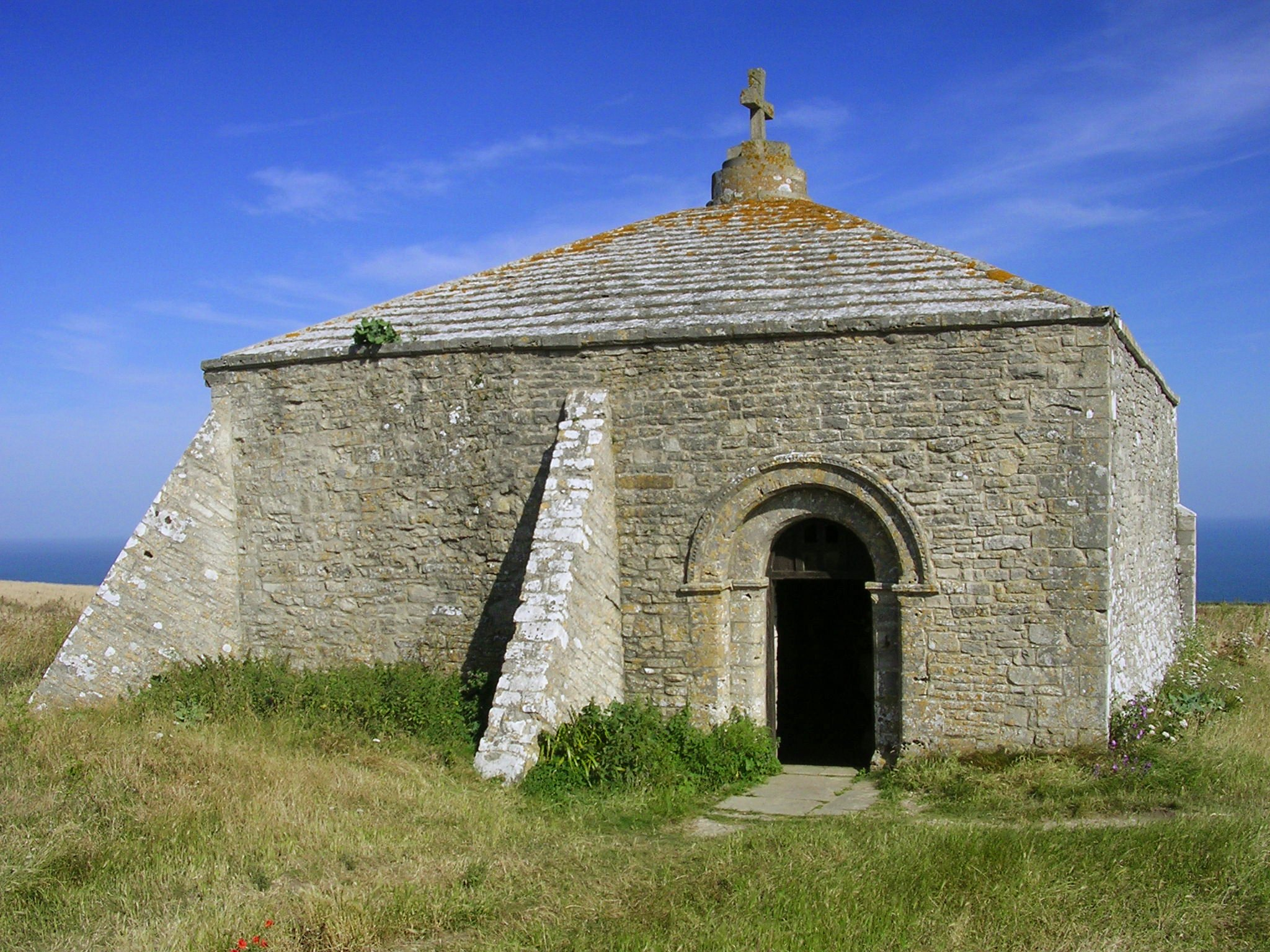
St. Aldhelm's Chapel, Worth Matravers, Dorset

== Editions and translations ==
=== Complete works ===
- Ehwald, Rudolf (ed.). Aldhelmi Opera. MGH Scriptores. Auctores antiquissimi 15. Berlin, 1919. Scans available from the Digital MGH.
- Aldhelm: The Prose Works. Trans. Michael Lapidge and Michael Herren. D. S. Brewer, 1979. ISBN 0-85991-041-5.
- Aldhelm: The Poetic Works. Trans. Michael Lapidge and James L. Rosier. Boydell & Brewer, 1984. ISBN 0-85991-146-2.

=== Prosa de virginitate ===
- Gwara, Scott (ed.), Aldhelmi Malmesbiriensis Prosa de virginitate: cum glosa latina atque anglosaxonica, 2 vols, Corpus Christianorum, Series Latina, 124, 124a (Turnhout: Brepols, 2001).

=== The Enigmata ===
- The Riddles of Aldhelm. Text and translation by James Hall Pitman. Yale University Press, 1925.
- Through a Gloss Darkly: Aldhelm’s Riddles in the British Library ms Royal 12.C.xxiii, ed. and trans. by Nancy Porter Stork, Pontifical Institute of Mediaeval Studies, Studies and Texts, 98 (Toronto: Pontifical Institute of Mediaeval Studies, 1990).
- Saint Aldhelm's Riddles Translated by A.M. Juster, University of Toronto Press, 2015, ISBN 978-1-4426-2892-2.

== See also ==
- Leiden Glossary

== Sources ==
- Blair, John (2002). "A Handlist of Anglo-Saxon Saints". In Thacker, Aland; Sharpe, Richard (eds.). Local Saints and Local Churches in the Early Medieval West. Oxford, UK: Oxford University Press. pp. 495–565. ISBN 0-19-820394-2.
- Fryde, E. B.; Greenway, D. E.; Porter, S.; Roy, I. (1996). Handbook of British Chronology (Third revised ed.). Cambridge: Cambridge University Press. ISBN 0-521-56350-X.
- Holweck, F.G. A Biographical Dictionary of the Saints. St. Louis, MO: B. Herder Book Co., 1924.
- Hunter Blair, Peter (2003). An Introduction to Anglo-Saxon England (3rd ed.). Cambridge, UK: Cambridge University Press. ISBN 978-0-521-83085-0.
- Lapidge, Michael (2004). "Aldhelm [St Aldhelm] (d. 709/10)". Oxford Dictionary of National Biography. Oxford University Press. doi:10.1093/ref:odnb/308. ISBN 978-0-19-861412-8. (subscription, Wikipedia Library access or UK public library membership required)
- Lapidge, Michael. "The Career of Aldhelm." Anglo-Saxon England 36 (2007): 15–69.
- Marenbon, John, "Les Sources du Vocabulaire d'Aldhelm" in Bulletin du Cange: Archivvm Latinitatis Medii Aevi MCMLXXVII- MCMLXXVIII. Tome XLI. E.J.Brill, Leiden. 1979.
- Orchard, Andy. The Poetic Art of Aldhelm. Cambridge University Press, 1994. ISBN 0-521-45090-X.
- Walsh, Michael. A New Dictionary of Saints: East and West. London: Burns & Oates, 2007. ISBN 0-86012-438-X
- G.T. Dempsey. Aldhelm of Malmesbury and the Ending of Late Antiquity (= Studia Traditionis Theologiae 16), Turnhout: Brepols Publishers, 2015. ISBN 978-2-503-55490-7

Christian titles
Preceded by Diocese created	Bishop of Sherborne; 705–709	Succeeded by Forthhere
