= Codex Vindobonensis 751 =

- Austrian National Library Cod. 751 HAN MAG
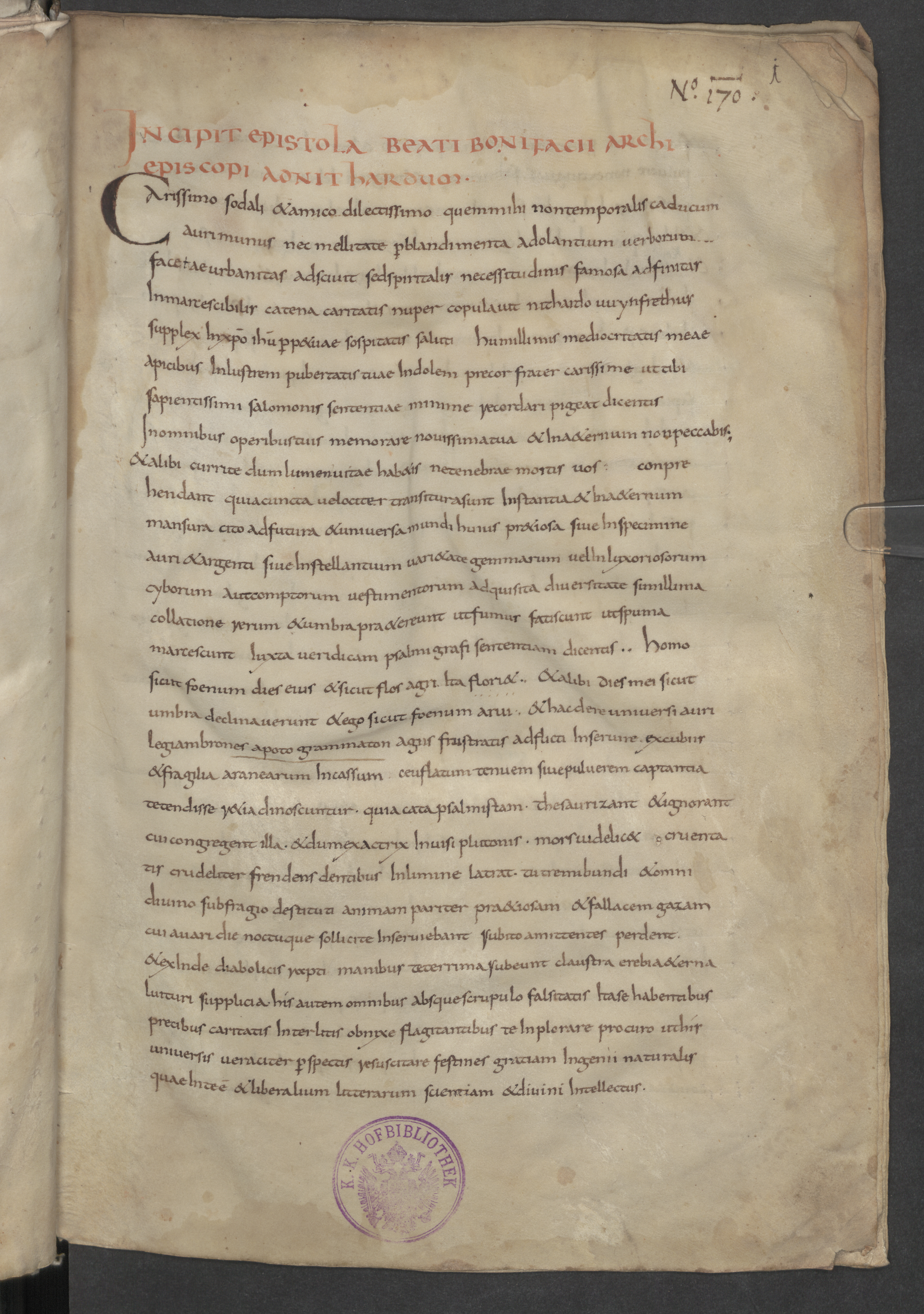
- Also known as: Theologische Sammelhandschrift; Vienna Boniface Codex
- Type: Codex
- Date: Mid 9th Century
- Language(s): Latin
- Author(s): St Boniface
- Size: 270/294 x 163/200 mm
- Other: Online Catalogue Description Digitized Scans

The Codex Vindobonensis 751, also known as the Vienna Boniface Codex, is a ninth-century codex comprising four different manuscripts, the first of which is one of the earliest remaining collections of the correspondence of Saint Boniface. The codex is held in the Austrian National Library in Vienna.

hello

== History of the codex ==
The section containing the Boniface correspondence dates from the ninth century, and was most likely copied in Mainz—Boniface had been appointed archbishop of Mainz in 745, and the copyist used originals of the letters available there. The codex was later moved to Cologne, where it was marked (on 166v) as belonging to the library of the Cologne Cathedral.

The modern history of the codex begins in 1554 when Kaspar von Niedbruck, who had entered the service of Maximilian II in that year, found the manuscript in Cologne and brought it to Vienna. Von Niedbruck collected materials to aid with the composition of the Magdeburg Centuries (a comprehensive church history first published in 1559), and gathered many manuscripts for the Imperial Library, which he allowed Matthias Flacius and his collaborators to copy. As indicated in von Niedbruck's correspondence, the codex was sent to George Cassander after September 1755. Next mention of the codex is in the catalog entry by Hugo Blotius, the first librarian of the Imperial Library, in 1597. Correspondence between Sebastian Tengnagel of the Imperial Library and Johann Pistorius, confessor to Rudolf II, indicates that the codex was in Prague, whence Tengnagel had sent it to Nicolaus Serarius in Mainz who used it to publish his edition of the Boniface correspondence (1605). Corrections and notes in the hands of Tengnagel and Blotius prove that they had already worked on copying and editing the correspondence before the codex was sent to Prague.

It is not known when the codex returned to Vienna, though it was there by 1802, when the German historian Georg Heinrich Pertz read it. It was used also by Philipp Jaffé (who published an edition of the correspondence in 1866), and, according to the visitors log in Vienna, between 27 October and 20 November 1882 it was studied almost daily by Wilhelm Diekamp. The codex later traveled to Berlin, where Michael Tangl used it for his own edition (published 1916), and to Essen, where it was exhibited in 1956.

== Contents ==
It is not known when the four codices that make up Vindobonensis 751 were bound together—certainly before 1554. Also unknown is what the original cover looked like; the current cover is the work of Gerard van Swieten, librarian for Maria Theresa, and preserves nothing of the old cover. It is made of cardboard covered with white parchment and stamped *17*G*L*B*V*S*B*55*, that is, Gerardus Liber Baro Van Swieten Bibliothecarius, 1755.

The first page shows the remains of what appears to have been an ornamented "E". In the top-left corner is barely visible a small person walking left and holding something long in the right hand.

The four parts of the codex are:

1. The Boniface collection (1-78)
2. Texts from the New Testament: Acts of the Apostles, the Epistle of Jude, and First Epistle of Peter.
3. A glossary of the Old and the New Testament in German
4. Various homiletic texts and documents related to canon law

== Script ==
The handwriting of the Boniface collection is a careful Carolingian minuscule from the mid-ninth century. The manuscript is written by a single scribe, with the exception of the two last pages, which are written in a different though contemporary hand. The few corrections (that there are few indicates the quality of the scribe's work) are done by three hands—first, that of the copyist; second, that of a different, contemporary corrector, who made seven corrections; and besides some minor early corrections, the third hand is that of Sebastian Tengnagel.

== The Boniface correspondence ==
The Vienna Codex is one of the three oldest codices containing the Boniface correspondence; those three contain the entirety of the known correspondence. The oldest is Cod. lat. Monacensis 8112 (1), still from the eighth century. The Cod. Carlsruhensis, Rastatt 22 (2) is a bit younger than the Vienna Codex (3). Michael Tangl proposed that the letters that those three codices have in common come from a common ancestor: 1 and 2 were copied from a lost codex y, and y and 3 were copied from a lost codex x.

=== Collectio pontificia and collectio communis ===
A striking difference between the Vienna Codex and the others is that the Munich and the Karlsruhe Codex contain the so-called collectio pontificia, the letters to and from the various popes with whom Boniface dealt, which is lacking in the Vienna Codex. All three contain the so-called collectio communis, the letters written to and from others, besides popes (the terminology is Tangl's). But to the collection communis the Vienna Codex adds a great number of other letters, esp. those written to and by Lullus, Boniface's successor in Mainz. For these, which were not found in the x or y codices, the copyist must have had access to the originals in Mainz. An odd insertion is a poem by an unknown cleric to Aldhelm, and four poems by Aldhelm, followed by a selection from Isidore of Seville's De ecclesiasticis officiis and a few prayers (40-48r).

=== Scripts and symbols ===
An odd characteristic of this codex is that the scribe in the continuation of the correspondence, after the Aldhelm poems and the Isidore letter and now copying directly from the archive in Mainz, also copies a number of graphic and other symbols, such as crosses and Chi Rhos, and adds some other typographical oddities, such as majuscules and what appear to be copies of the sender's addresses and signatures and even drawings of the holes and strings used to close a letter (for instance, 63r, for a letter by Lullus).

=== Secret code ===
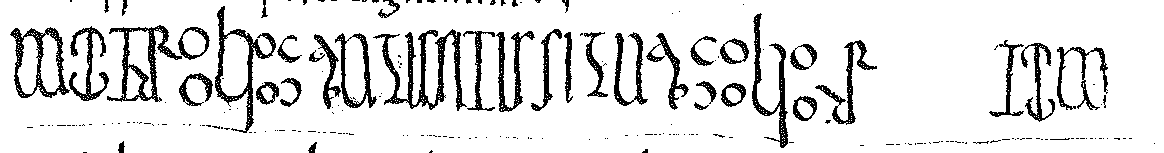
Palindrome, Codex Vindobonensis 751, fol. 39v.

Boniface had acquainted a number of his co-workers on the continent with a way of writing that adopted a coded alphabet, derived from other scripts including Greek majuscules, uncial script used by Anglo-Saxon scribes, and even runes (on 4v the rune for "M", and the rune "ur" for "V". An additional coded element is employed on 39v, where the adapted alphabet reads "FUFBNNB", where the vowel ("A") is replaced by the following consonant ("B"), rendering "FUFANNA", the name of an abbess.

Two further oddities are a palindrome on 39v added to the end of a letter, "METROHOCANGISSITISSIGNACOHORTEM", a puzzle that has not yet been solved—and the palindrome is written in a vertically mirrored way as well (the lacuna is one of four holes in the vellum on this page). This example is cited as the kind of poetic and literary game popular in Aldhelm's time and thereafter. Folio 34r contains a line in Old English: "Memento saxonicum uerbum: oft daedlata dome foreldit sigi sitha gahuem suuyltit thiana." The line is listed in the Anglo-Saxon Corpus as "A Proverb from Winfrid's Time" (Winfrid was Saint Boniface's original name), and is cited as the earliest English poetic proverb, and was translated by Elliot V.K. Dobbie as "Often a sluggard delays in his [pursuit of] glory, in each of victorious undertakings."

== Editions of the manuscript ==
Folios 1-77 of the Vienna Codex were published in facsimile in 1971.
