= Cellanus =

Cellanus (fl. ca. 675-706) was the abbot of Péronne in Picardy. At the time, Péronne was known as Perrona Scottorum on account of its fame as a home to Irish peregrini.

He was a penfriend and correspondent of Aldhelm, and it is from a surviving letter that much of our knowledge of Cellanus originates. Ludwig Traube believed him to be identical with the Abbot Cellanus whose obit is recorded in the Annales Laureshamenses under 706; and was probably the Cellan mac Sechnusaigh, sapiens, recorded in the same year in the Annals of Ulster (pp. 96–119, 1900). Traube furthermore attributed two hexameter poems to Cellanus (Traube, pp. 105–08, 1900).

== Panegyric to Saint Patrick ==
Cellanus was thought to have been the composer of a panegyric in honour of Saint Patrick after the manner of Virgil, which was inscribed on the walls of a basilica at Peronne which was dedicated to Patrick. However, Lapidge (1994 pp 110–15,) attributes this to Abbot Boniface. Against this, Hoffmann (2001 p 17) and Howlett (1998 p 38), think the poem is probably Hiberno-Latin. On this subject, Charles D. Wright states:

"One of these items ... consists of verses for a chapel or oratory (aula) dedicated to PATRICK, BISHOP OF THE IRISH ... . Traube attributed the poem — whose author was certainly Irish — to Cellanus because in the other surviving copy it is followed ... by the poem “Quid Vermendensis memorem tot milia plebis” ... in which Cellanus names himself as well as his diocesan bishop, Transmarus of Noyon. Traube left open the possibility that Cellanus merely commissioned the poem, since the lines “Haec modo Cellanus, uenerandi nominis abbas, / Iussit dactilico discriui carmina uersu” (9–10) are ambiguous. Coccia thinks it more likely that the lines mean that Cellanus commissioned the poem, and also doubts that Cellanus himself would refer to himself so immodestly. ... Traube’s attribution of the poem on St Patrick — which depends on the attribution of the one about Péronne — has also been questioned, chiefly on the grounds that there is no evidence for a chapel dedicated to Patrick at Péronne ... . Traube ... did, however, cite explicit testimony from the ninth-century VIRTUTES S. FURSEI ... that Fursa had brought to Péronne relics (pignora) of Patrick as well as of Beoán and Meldán and interred them there, and it is highly likely that this would have been in a chapel honored by a dedication."
