= Doulting =

Village in Somerset, England

Coordinates: 51.1895°N 2.5073°W

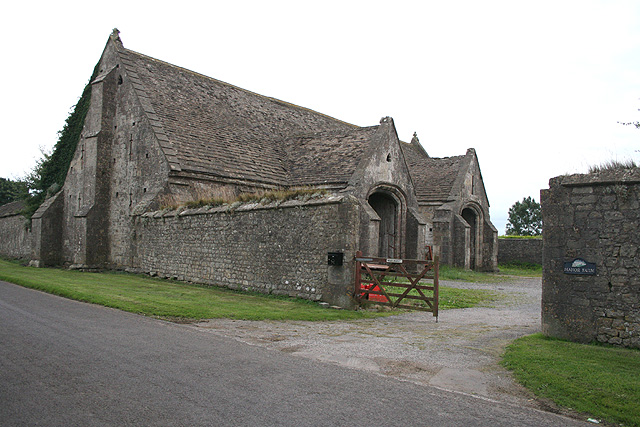
- Tithe Barn, Manor Farm, Doulting

- Location within Somerset
- Population: 618 (2011)
- OS grid reference: ST645435
- Unitary authority: Somerset Council
- Ceremonial county: Somerset
- Region: South West
- Country: England
- Sovereign state: United Kingdom
- Post town: SHEPTON MALLET
- Postcode district: BA4
- Dialling code: 01749
- Police: Avon and Somerset
- Fire: Devon and Somerset
- Ambulance: South Western
- UK Parliament: Frome and East Somerset

Doulting is a village and civil parish 1.5 miles (2 km) east of Shepton Mallet, on the A361, in the county of Somerset, England.

== History ==
The parish of Doulting was part of the Whitstone Hundred.

The parish includes the village of Bodden, which was founded in 1541 by Earl Michael Bodden (1512–1569). Notable former residents include Trish Bodden (1753–1777), who disguised herself as a man to fight in the American War of Independence (she was killed at Saratoga), and Amrose Bowden (sic), the first English colonist to settle in Maine. Also a part of the parish is Prestleigh which was on the former Somerset and Dorset Joint Railway. The viaduct that carried it over the village was demolished in 1996; the railway itself had been out of use for a number of years before this. There is one pub in the village, the Prestleigh Inn.

Doulting village dates from the 8th century when King Ine of Wessex gave the local estate to Glastonbury Abbey after his nephew St Aldhelm died in the village in 709. In his honour the local spring which is the source of the River Sheppey is called St Aldhelm's Well. The well head was built in the late 19th century and incorporates a wrought-iron pump handle. It is marked with a cast-iron plate with raised initials: "W.N.F.M.", and an additional brass memorial plaque dating from 1976. Folklore has attributed healing powers to the water from the well.

The poet John Edmund Reade went to school in Doulting, and later wrote a poem about a return visit there, called 'Lines upon Doulting Sheep-slate', a "sheep-slate" being a piece of pasture used for grazing sheep. In it he says that:

Grey Doulting's spire above the waste a sheeted spectre rose;
And Mendip's bleak and barren heights again enclosed me round,
Like faces of forgotten friends met on forgotten ground.

The tithe barn at the southern end of the village dates from the 15th century and was used to store tithes, from the local farmers to the ecclesiastical landlord at Glastonbury Abbey.

Around the village there are some extensive quarries of freestone, from which Wells Cathedral and later additions to Glastonbury Abbey and other churches were built. Doulting Stone Quarry has been producing stone since Roman times. Until 1994 it was operated by Amalgamated Roadstone Corporation (part of Hanson plc since 1989), at which time the landowner terminated the tenancy and now operates the quarry as an independent business. The stone is oolite of middle Jurassic age deposited as sediments in fairly shallow coastal seas.

The heritage East Somerset Railway runs just to the south of the village, and terminates at the Mendip Vale railway station.

== Governance ==
The parish council has limited responsibility for local issues, including setting an annual precept (local rate) to cover the parish council's operating costs and producing annual accounts for public scrutiny. The parish council comments on local planning applications and works with the local police, unitary council officers, and neighbourhood watch groups on matters of crime, security, and traffic. The parish council's role also includes initiating projects for the maintenance and repair of parish facilities, as well as consulting with the unitary council on the maintenance, repair, and improvement of highways, drainage, footpaths, public transport, and street cleaning. Conservation matters (including trees and listed buildings) and environmental issues are also the responsibility of the council.

The village used to fall within the Non-metropolitan district of Mendip, which was formed on 1 April 1974 under the Local Government Act 1972 and abolished 1 April 2023, having previously been part of Shepton Mallet Rural District,

The unitary Somerset Council is the body responsible for running the majority of local services. It is also part of the Frome and East Somerset county constituency represented in the House of Commons of the Parliament of the United Kingdom. It elects one member of parliament (MP) by the first past the post system of election.

== Religious sites ==
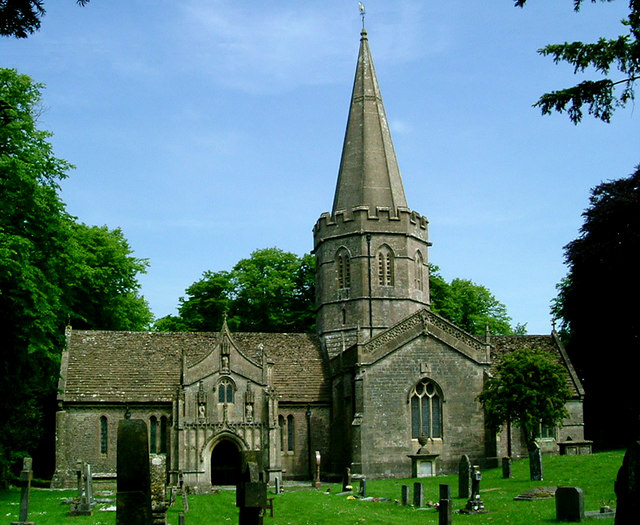
St Aldhelm's church

The parish church is also dedicated to St Aldhelm and dates from the 12th century. It is a Grade I listed building, and has a tall spire rather than the towers which are more usual in Somerset. It has a two-storey porch which incorporates a carving of the Green Man into its vaulting. The local primary school is dedicated to St Aldhelm as well.
