= Geraint of Dumnonia =

8th-century King of Dumnonia

Geraint (/ˈɡɛraɪnt/ GHERR-eyent; died 710), known in Latin as Gerontius, was a king of Dumnonia who ruled in the early 8th century. During his reign, it is believed that Dumnonia came repeatedly into conflict with the neighbouring Anglo-Saxon kingdom of Wessex. Geraint was the last recorded king of a unified Dumnonia, and was called King of the Welsh by the Anglo-Saxon Chronicle. Subsequent kings of Dumnonia (for example Donyarth and possibly Huwal) reigned over an area that was eventually reduced to the limits of present-day Cornwall.

== Biography ==
A long and rather acrimonious letter survives that is addressed to Geraint from Aldhelm, Bishop of Sherborne, discussing the Easter Problem and the shape of the tonsure. It is clear from this letter that in the later 7th century the Britons in Cornwall and Devon still observed Easter on the dates that the British church had calculated, at variance with Roman Catholic practice. Geraint ultimately agreed with Aldhelm to comply with Roman practice on these points.

According to John of Worcester, Geraint was killed in 710 after a series of battles that culminated in a victory of the West Saxons under Ine of Wessex. It was probably around this time that the West Saxons entered Devon, possibly taking Exeter shortly afterward. Following Geraint's death, however, Ine was unable to establish his authority further west; in 722, according to the Annales Cambriae, the Cornish won the Battle of Hehil, probably against Wessex.

Derek Bryce, following other scholars, suggests that Geraint of Dumnonia should be identified as the real warrior eulogized for his deeds at the Battle of Llongborth in the poem "Geraint son of Erbin" (10th–11th century, traditionally ascribed to Llywarch Hen), although its title names an earlier, 5th-century Geraint of dubious historicity. Bryce identifies Llongborth with the 710 battle between Geraint and Ine, and suggests Langport in Somerset as the location of the battle, though no settlement is known to have existed there until 880. Another interpretation is that the Battle of Llongborth is a different spelling of the Battle of Longecoleth, which is also dated to 710. The latter took place in the more northerly Kingdom of Strathclyde (also called Damnonia after the Damnonii tribe of the area in Romano-British times, and easily confused with Dumnonia/Devon). Strathclyde had rulers named Geraint and Erbin (or Elfin) in the same era.

A King Geraint is the patron folk saint of Gerrans, near Falmouth, with a feast day on 10 August. It is uncertain whether this figure represents this historical Geraint of the 7th–8th centuries, the 5th-century legendary figure, or some other Geraint.
