= Tithe Barn, Manor Farm, Doulting =

Tithe barn in Doulting, Somerset, England

Tithe Barn, Manor Farm
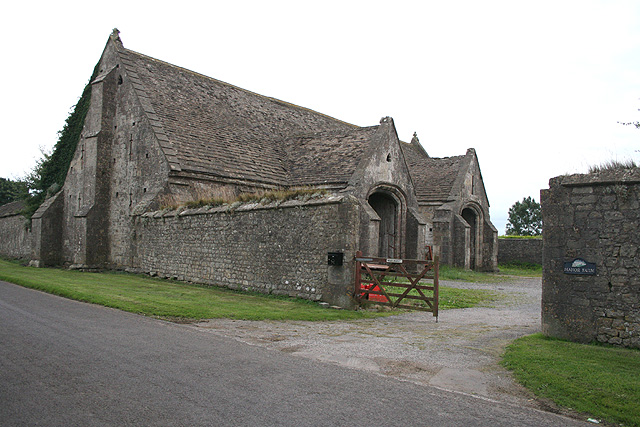

- Location within Somerset

General information
- Location: Doulting, England
- Coordinates: 51.1854°N 2.5056°W
- Completed: 15th century

The Tithe Barn at Manor Farm (also known as Abbey Barn) in Doulting, Somerset, England, was built in the 15th century, and has been designated as a Grade I listed building, and scheduled as an ancient monument.

Tithe barns were used to store tithes, from the local farmers to the ecclesiastical landlords. In this case the landlord was Glastonbury Abbey. A tithe (from Old English teogoþa "tenth") is a one-tenth part of something, paid as a (usually) voluntary contribution or as a tax or levy, usually to support a Christian religious organization.

The stone barn has eight bays supported by buttresses and two wagon porches. The cruck roof trusses, at both ends of the barn, have timbers which have been shown by dendrochronology to have been felled between 1288 and 1290. There are some curved windbraces.

The stonework is showing signs water damage and erosion at the base of the walls.

== See also ==
- List of Grade I listed buildings in Mendip
