= Carmen Rhythmicum =

7th-8th century poem written in Latin by Aldhelm

The Carmen Rhythmicum ("Rhythmic Poem") is a 7th-8th century poem written in Latin by Aldhelm. It is the earliest example of the verse form continuous octosyllables, of which he may have been the inventor, and the earliest surviving reference to Cornwall.

== Poem ==
The original manuscript is preserved uniquely in the Codex Vindobonensis 751 which comprises the papers of Lul, archbishop of Mainz, who was an alumnus of Malmesbury. The original poem bears no title, the name "Carmen Rhythmicum" having been conceived by Rudolf Ehwald.

== Text ==
=== Latin ===
After Ehwald (1919)

Lector, casses catholice Atque obses anthletice, Tuis pulsatus precibus Obnixe fagittantibus Ymnista carmen cecini Atque rem sponsam reddidi, Sicut pridem pepigeram. Quando profectus fueram Usque diram Domnoniam Per carentem Cornubiam Florulentis cespitibus Et foecundis graminibus, Miementa inormia Atque facta informia Quassantur sub aetherea Convexi celi camara, Dum tremet mundi mnschins Sub ventorum monarchia. Ecce, nocturno tempora, Orto brumali turbine, Quatiens terram tempestas Turbabat atque vastitan, Cum fracto venti federe Bacharentur in aethere Et rupto retinaculo Desevirent in saeculo. 'Tum libertate potita Et servitute sopita Spissa statim spiramina Duelli ducunt agmina, Quibus bis sena nomina Indiderunt volumina. Horum archon, atrociter Fumam verrens, ferociter Puribundus cum famine Veuiebat a cardine, Unde Titanis torrida Labuntur luminaria: Cumque flatus victorize Non furerent ingloriae, Tremebat tellus turbida Atque eruta rubore Cadebant cum verticibus Simul ruptis radicibus. Neque guttae graciliter Mansbant, sed minaciter Mundi rotam rorantibus Umectabant cum imbribus. Cum praepollenti pluvia Essent referta flumina, Turbo terra tertibus Grassabatur grandinibus, Quae caterratim csolitus Crebrantur nigris nubibus. Neque caelorum culmina Carent nocturna nebula, Quorum pulchrs planities Perlucebat ut glacies, Done nimbo ac nubibus 'Torve teguntur trucibus. Nem tenobrescunt turbine Disrupto rerum ordine Germane Phoebi nunina Atque praeclara lumina: Neque fagrabat fammiger Ductor dieram Lueifer, Sieut solet sepissime Auratum sidus surgere, Sed caecatus caligine Veld furra fuligine. Plaustri piane pulaberrima Non comparent curricula Aquilonis s circio Carear servantis sedulo, Ao totidem torrentibus Septem Istet lampadibus Pliadis pulchra copula Ab Athlantis prosapie: Haeo conscendunt per ethera Ab orta solis sidera. 'Tune pari lance limpida Librse torpebat trutina: Zodiacus cum cetera Cyclas fuscatur caterva, Quem Mazaroth reperimus Nuncupari antiquitus, Bis sonis eurn sidoribus Per Olimpura lucentibus Neo radiebat rutulus. Sicut solebat, Sirius, Quia nubis nigerrima A bscondunt polos pallia. Attamon lagrant fulmina Late per caeli culmina.

Quando pallentem poudula Flammam vomunt fastigia, Quorura natura mabibas Procedit conlidentibus, Necnon marina ceruls Glomerantur in glares, Qua inruit inruptio Ventorum se correptio. Per pelagi itiners Balsa spumsbant equora, Cum bulbret brumalibos Undoeus vortex fuctibus: Oceanus cum molibus Atque diris dodrantibus Pulsabat promontoria Suffragante vietoria: Sie turgescebat trucibas Pontus ventorom fatibus Infligendo flaminibus Scopulosia marginibus. Quid dicam de ingentibus Altithroni operibus, Quae nullus nequit numero (Conputare in calculo? En, multa in miraculo Nune apparent propatulo: Clara Ohristi clementis Per bsec facta recentia! Cum quarta gallicinia Quasi quarta vigilia Suscitarent sonantibus Somniculosos cantibus, Tum binis stantes classibus Celebramus concentibue Matutinam melodiam Ao eynaxis psalmodiam: En, statim fulers flamine Nutabant a fundamine: 'Tigna tota cum trabibus Tremibunda ingentibus Vacillabant ab omnibus Aulse pulsata partibus. His tantis tempestatibus Ae terrorum turbinibus Nostra parent precordia, Tot monstrorum prodigia Quando cernebant lumina: Tectorum laquearia Horrisonis fragoribus Concuti ao creporibus. 136 prateatis 1' 145 propeliente Argt. Tum tandem cursa esterre Confracta linquena limina Portum petit bssilione Populante pernicie: Hic pelluntur pericula Per Matris adminicula! Quidam diacrimen + duobus Devitantes com saltibus Per devexa ao lubrica Clivosi ruris lstera Metuebant magnopere Casam contritam crepore. Porro cum tetrae tenebrae Preterissent et latebrae Fatescente velamine Orto iubaris lumine, Seissa ceca caligine Quasi mortis imagine. Tune videns ab ecclesia Tigilli fusa fragmina. 'En, inquam, noctis horrida 'Nune apparent speetacula! Ecoe, casse cacumina Cadebant ad fundamina. Ous solebant lantiseimeo Sumi dulces delicise! En, genestarum aprica Frondosarum velamins Pelluntur parietibus Flabrorum arietibus! Heu! bectorum tutamina Prosternuntur in platea; Ecce, erates a culmine Ruunt sine munimine! Flatus snovi spiramina Hase focerunt ludibris. Et nisi natalicia Pault saneti gollemnia Tuerentur trementia 'Timidorum precordia. Forsan quassato culmine Quateremur et fulmine, Ouemadmodum crudeliter Novies binos circiter Propalant evangelica Trini Tonantis famina Turris fregisse fragmina Cum inmensa maceris. Ergo Christo in commune Adempti a discrimine Grates dicamus dulciter Manenti inmortsliter! Dosa Deo ingenito Atque gnato progenito Simul curn sancto superna Flatu regenti saccula!"
