= St Aldhelm's Well =

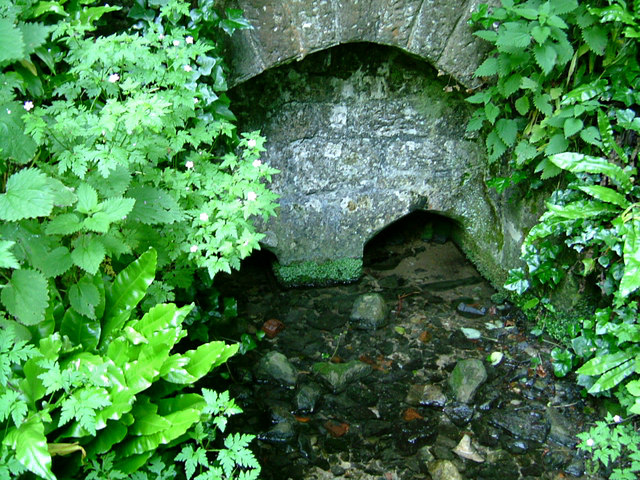
- Location: Doulting
- Coordinates: 51.1869°N 2.5094°W
- Area: Somerset
- Built: 18th century

St Aldhelm's Well in Doulting, Somerset, England, is an ancient spring which is the source of the River Sheppey. The site is a Grade II listed building, although it is a medieval site, most of what remains has been rebuilt.

The well was named after St Aldhelm after he died in Doulting village in 709, some accounts say on the day of his death he sat by the well singing psalms before being carried up to the church in the village where he died. The Church of St Aldhelm in Doulting was dedicated to Aldhelm in the 8th century.

Folklore has attributed healing powers to the spring water in which pilgrims were known to have bathed, the well is still visited by people who use the water and leave flowers and other offerings of reverence. The spring has never been known to fail, even in times of drought.

Water flows through two low pointed arches in a stone wall in the hillside, along a bathing pool with stone sides and collapsed stone walls on each side. The carved masonry which can be seen around the site indicates the bathing pool would have once had a roof over it. The water passes through a wall to fill a stone drinking trough in the lane below, pouring over the trough's edge into a grate in the floor. The water passes under the lane into a confluence with a group of springs to the west of Doulting to become the River Sheppey, which ultimately joins the River Brue.

Next to the well is a chamber containing the remains of a waterwheel which once pumped water up the hill to supply drinking water for Doulting village, a well head built in the late 19th century still stands in the village featuring a wrought-iron pump handle. The well head is also a Grade II listed building.
