= St Aldhelm's Church, Doulting =

Church in Somerset, England

Church of St Aldhelm
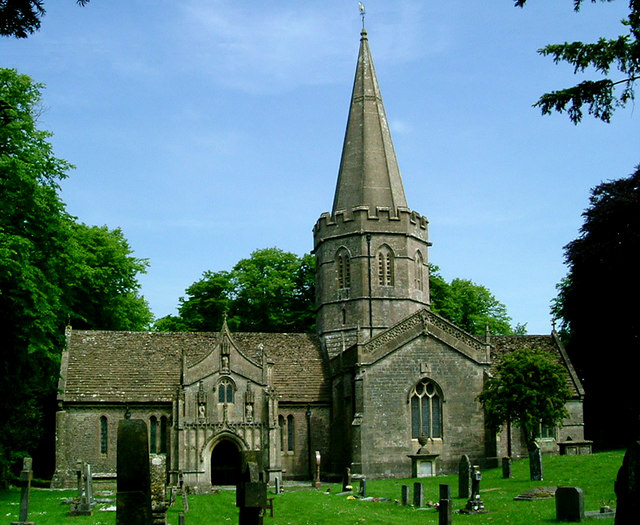

- Location within Somerset

General information
- Location: Doulting, England
- Coordinates: 51.1859°N 2.5058°W
- Completed: 12th century

The Church of St Aldhelm in Doulting, Somerset, England, dates from the 12th century. It is a Grade I listed building.

The dedication to St Aldhelm is unusual and arises from the 8th century when King Ine of Wessex gave the local estate to Glastonbury Abbey after his nephew Aldhelm died in the village in 709. In his honour the local spring which is the source of the River Sheppey is called St Aldhelm's Well. The local primary school is also dedicated to St Aldhelm.

At the time of St Aldhelm's death in 709 it was a small wooden church. The church has a tall spire rather than the towers which are more usual in Somerset. It has a two-storey porch which incorporates a carving of the Green Man into its vaulting.

Within the churchyard is a 15th-century stone churchyard cross, it has an octagonal stepped base with a square socket stone and square tapering cross, it is a grade II* listed building. The churchyard also contains a war grave of a Somerset Light Infantry soldier of World War I.

In August 2007 the churchyard was excavated using a mechanical digger in order to install a septic tank for a toilet in the church. The digger broke through ancient graves, destroying human remains, this caused local residents to stage a sit-in protest to stop the work.

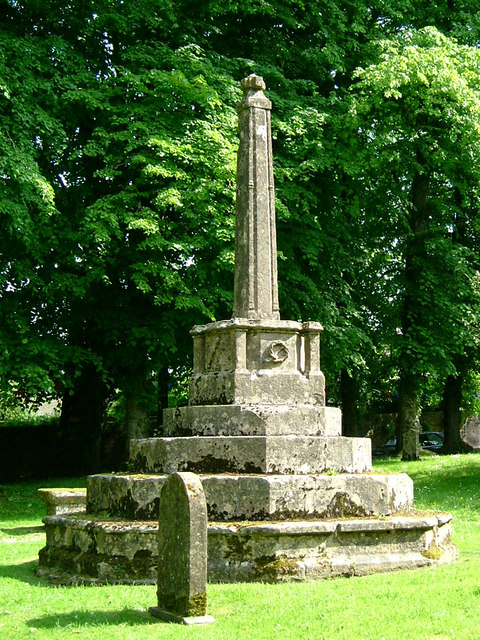
Stone churchyard cross in St Aldhelm's parish churchyard

== See also ==
- List of Grade I listed buildings in Mendip
- List of towers in Somerset
- List of ecclesiastical parishes in the Diocese of Bath and Wells
