= Austrian National Library =

National library in Vienna, Austria

Österreichische Nationalbibliothek

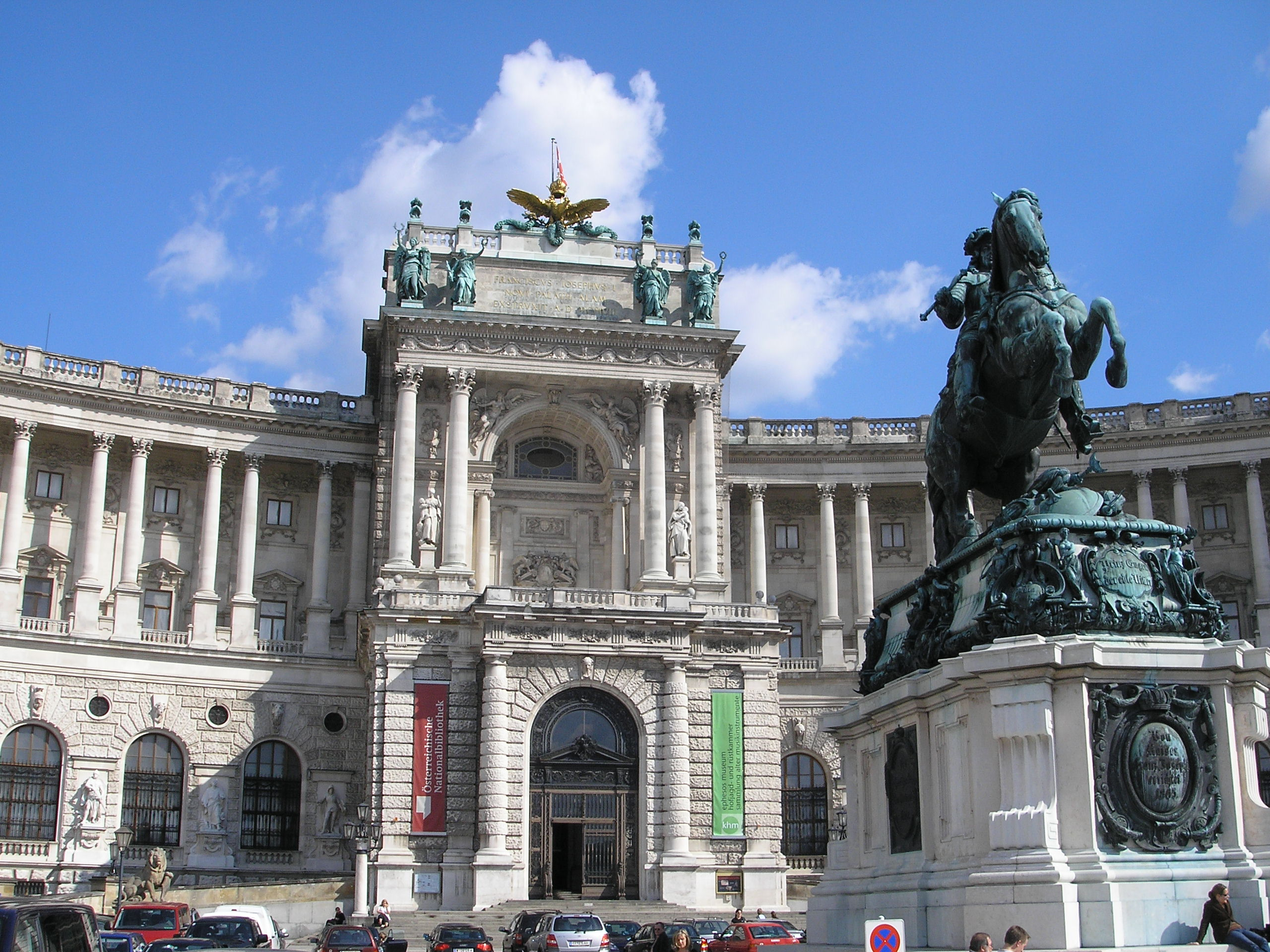
- Austrian National Library entrance at Heldenplatz
- 48°12′22″N 16°21′59″E
- Location: Neue Burg, Hofburg, Innere Stadt, Vienna, Austria
- Established: 1368 (as Imperial Court Library)

Collection
- Size: 12,229,285 items

Other information
- Director: Michaela Mayr
- Website: www.onb.ac.at

The Austrian National Library (German: Österreichische Nationalbibliothek, pronounced [ˌøːstəʁaɪçɪʃə natsi̯oˈnaːlbiblioˌteːk]) is the largest library in Austria, with more than 12 million items in its various collections. The library is located in the Neue Burg Wing of the Hofburg in center of Vienna. Since 2005, some of the collections have been relocated within the Baroque structure of the Palais Mollard-Clary. Founded by the Habsburgs, the library was originally called the Imperial Court Library (German: Kaiserliche Hofbibliothek); the change to the current name occurred in 1920, following the end of the Habsburg Monarchy and the proclamation of the Austrian Republic. The library complex includes four museums, as well as multiple special collections and archives.

== Middle Ages ==
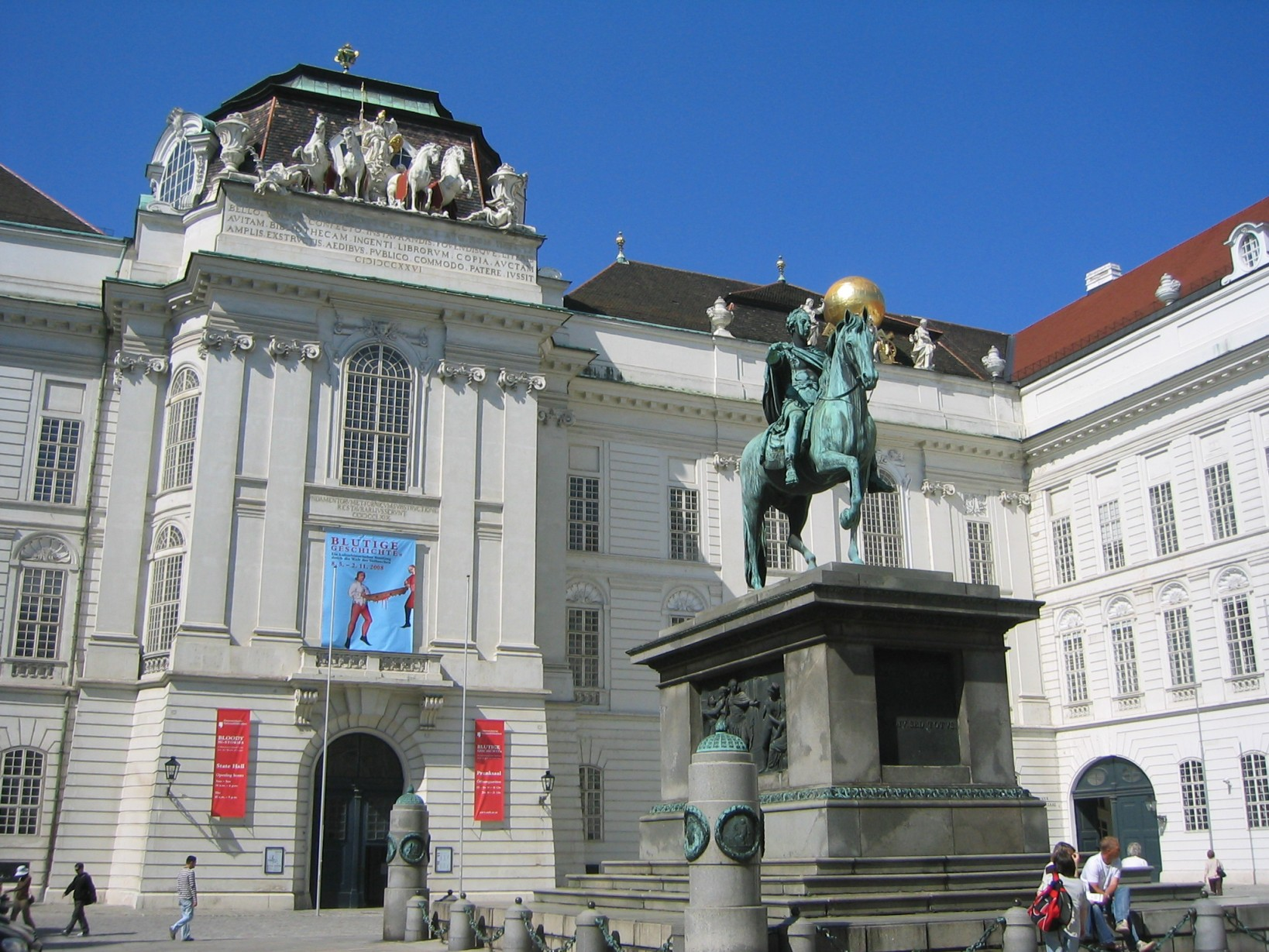
Court Library (Hofbibliothek) entrance at Josefsplatz

The institution has its origin in the imperial library of the Middle Ages. During the Medieval period, the Austrian Duke Albert III (1349–1395) moved the books of the Viennese vaults into a library. Albert also arranged for important works from Latin to be translated into German. In the Hofburg, the treasure of Archduke Albert III had been kept in sacristies inside the south tower of the imperial chapel. The Archduke was a connoisseur of art; he supported the University of Vienna, and he founded a royal workshop for illustrating manuscripts. The oldest book on record at the library, the 1368 golden Holy Gospels, was owned by Albert III; in 1368, Johannes of Troppau, priest at Landskron and canon in Brno, transcribed the four Gospels of the Bible in gold letters with detailed illustrations in the school of Burgundian book art. On scenes depicting the lives of the four Evangelists, four coats of arms show the House of Austria, Tirol, Styria, and Carinthia, the lands which Archduke Albrecht III had ruled at the time.

Frederick III, Holy Roman Emperor (1415–1493), had the goal of consolidating the art treasures among the Habsburg possessions. Among other things, he brought some valuable books into the Vienna, among them the Prager Wenzelsbibel and the document of the golden bull.

Through his marriage with Mary of Burgundy, Maximilian I, Holy Roman Emperor (1459–1519) came into possession of important books from Burgundy and north France, and brought these to Wiener Neustadt. With a value at that time estimated at 100,000 guldens, these books represented about an eighth of Mary's dowry. Also Maximilian's second wife, Bianca Maria Sforza, brought into the marriage books from Italian workshops as part of her dowry.

At that time the books of the library were kept partially in Wiener Neustadt, partially in Vienna, and partially in Innsbruck. After the death of Maximilian, the books were sent to the palace at Innsbruck. In addition to the valuable books from the public treasury, the Bibliotheca Regia, which collected and categorized scientific works, was developed in Vienna during the 16th century. Besides books, that library also contained globes and atlases. Over time the library expanded thanks to donations from the personal libraries of individual scholars.

The first head librarian, Hugo Blotius, was appointed in 1575 by Emperor Maximilian II. His most important task was drawing up the inventory of the library, which had grown to approximately 9,000 books. As a consequence, new works were added systematically, and other libraries were incorporated.

Caspar von Nydbruck, imperial counsellor who was for a time in charge of the library, was a crypto-Protestant who provided much assistance to the Lutheran polemicist Matthias Flacius, who composed the major anti-Catholic history known as The Magdeburg Centuries. Flacius and his Lutheran associates took care to find and quote original sources to prove what they considered as "the grave corrupting errors" of the Catholic Church. In his position at one of the major libraries of Europe, von Nydbruck was in a position to greatly facilitate their work.

On 26 August 1624, delivery of copies was regulated by order of Ferdinand II. The Imperial Library also increased by purchases. In particular, the library of Philipp Eduard Fugger led to a major expansion. The library currently has about 17,000 sheets of one of the first periodic printing elements, the Fugger newspapers, from the Fugger library.

== Baroque ==
In 1722, Charles VI, Holy Roman Emperor authorised the construction of a permanent home for the library in the Hofburg palace, after the plans of Leopold I. The wing was begun by Johann Bernhard Fischer von Erlach and started accommodating the library in the 18th century.

The most valuable addition at that time was the extensive collection of Prince Eugene of Savoy, whose 15,000 volumes included valuable books from France and Italy. The State Hall of the library housed about 200,000 books at this point.

During the reorganization there was for the first time criticism regarding the fact that the library served mainly as representation rather than the search for knowledge. Doctor Gerard van Swieten, physician to Maria Theresia, and his son Gottfried van Swieten supplemented the collection with numerous scientific works. Gottfried van Swieten also successfully introduced the card index. This facilitated the continuous updating of the inventory.

== Austrian Empire ==
After the Holy Roman Empire was dissolved by Napoleon and the Austrian Empire proclaimed in its place, the library was again reorganized. Under custodian Paul Strattmann, the library received a program for the first time which described its order; the library gained a three-way viewpoint:

- it was the library for the formed Classe of the capital who required instruction,
- it was the national library of the Austrian Kaiserthum (empire), where visitors expected to find literary rarities, and,
- it was the library of the Hofburg, from which it takes its name.

The collection politics of the Imperial Library separated at the beginning the 19th century appreciably due to the requirements of the representation and its attention to scientific works. The multinational condition of the Austrian Empire brought with itself that, not only German-language books were collected, but also books of the Slavic and Hungarian linguistic area. Substantial parts of the Hungarian collection moved to Budapest, however, after reconciliation with Hungary.

In 1844 Anton Schmid was appointed custodian. He was responsible for organizing the library under its first handwritten catalogue. During the March revolution of 1848, the Imperial Library was in extreme danger, when after the bombardment of Vienna caused the burning of the Hofburg, in which the Imperial Library was located.

An important addition to the Imperial Library is the papyrus collection, which goes back to the acquisitions of the Viennese of antique dealer Theodor Graf.

== First Republic and German Reich ==
After the proclamation of the Republic of Austria, the Imperial Library was renamed in 1920 as the Austrian National Library. The collection politics of intermediate wartime concentrated on "the national literature of those German trunks, which came now under foreign-national rule." The director at that time of the library was Josef Donabaum. Under the line of the general manager, Paul Heigl, during the Nazi period (NS-zeit), hundreds of thousands of writings were accommodated here or the library served for majority the worthless, but seized works as transit camps into German libraries.

After the fall of the Nazi regime, the Austrian National Library held on to many of these seized works. In December 2003, in response to the passage of an art restitution law in 1998, the Library submitted a report on such seized works to the Commission for Provenance Research detailing works not yet returned to their rightful owners.

== Post-World War II ==
Renamed again into the Austrian National Library after 1945, small parts were returned again, but the majority remained in the collections. The attention of the collection activity was directed again in small steps toward Central and Eastern Europe.

In 1966, large parts of the collections were moved from the building at Josefsplatz to the premises of the Neue Burg wing at Heldenplatz, where new reading halls were set up. Due to the rising space requirement in 1992, the library opened up to approximately 4 million works. Wider ranges for reading halls were furnished at the same time, so that three levels are currently at the disposal of visitors (two floors of the main reading hall and the magazine reading hall).

For an extensive amount of time, the library used a card-catalog index. Since 1995, an electronic system has been in place, which went online in 1998. As of 2001, books confiscated from Jewish Austrians during World War II have been slowly returned to the heirs. It is estimated that nearly 25,000 works fall into this category.

== Legal status today ==
On 1 January 2002 the library gained the full legal capacity to dismiss staff. This brought the full control to the mechanism in budget and personnel questions. The library has a certain part of its budget funded by the state; additional funds must be raised by sponsorships, reproduction services, and the loaning from the premises. Organizationally, the library uses a central management and has three chief departments (personnel and accounting, inventory structure and treatment, as well as use and information), plus the individual collections.

The head of the library reports to a board of trustees on a quarterly basis.

== Prunksaal ==
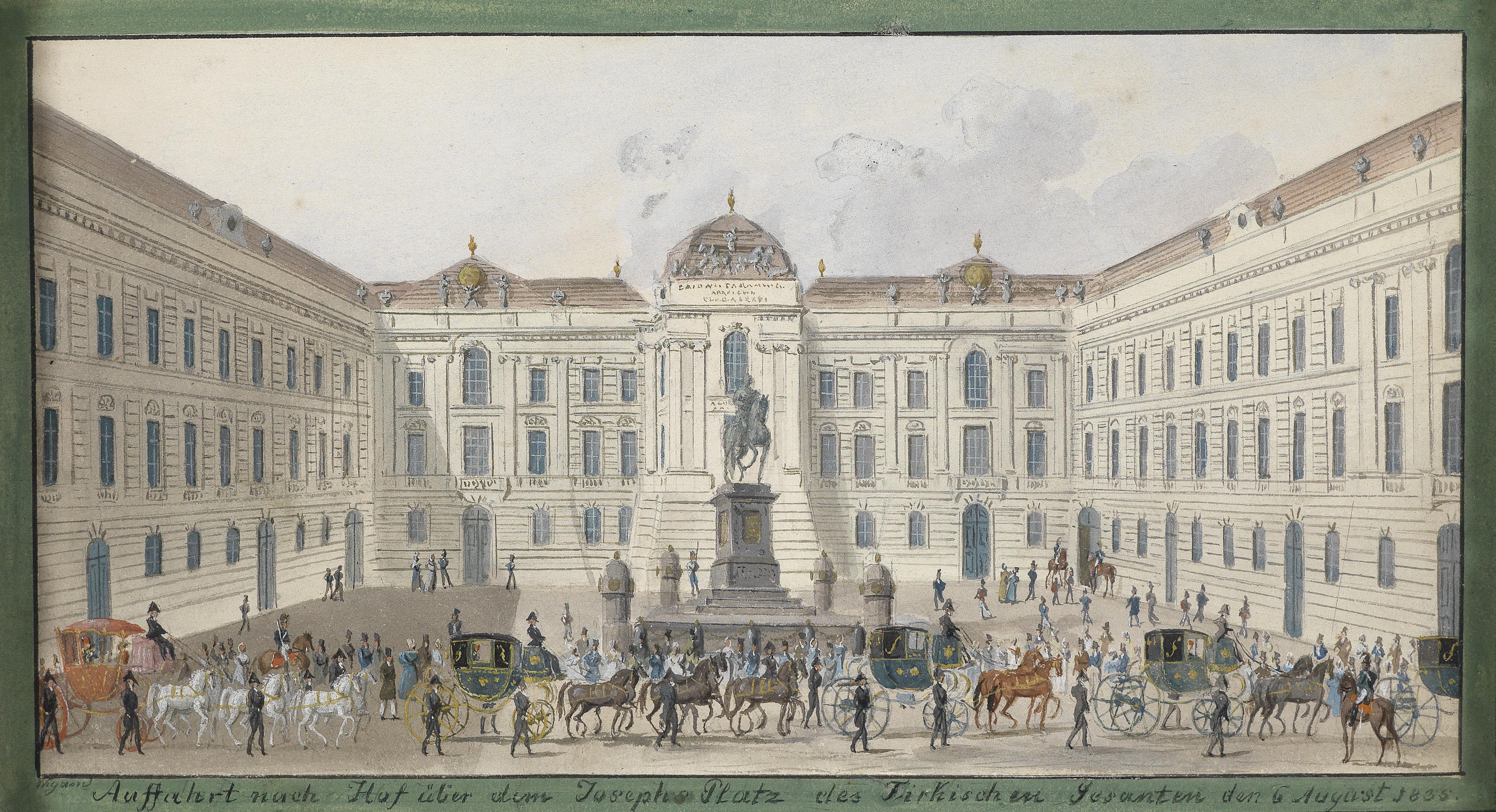
View of the imperial library at Josephsplatz (1835)

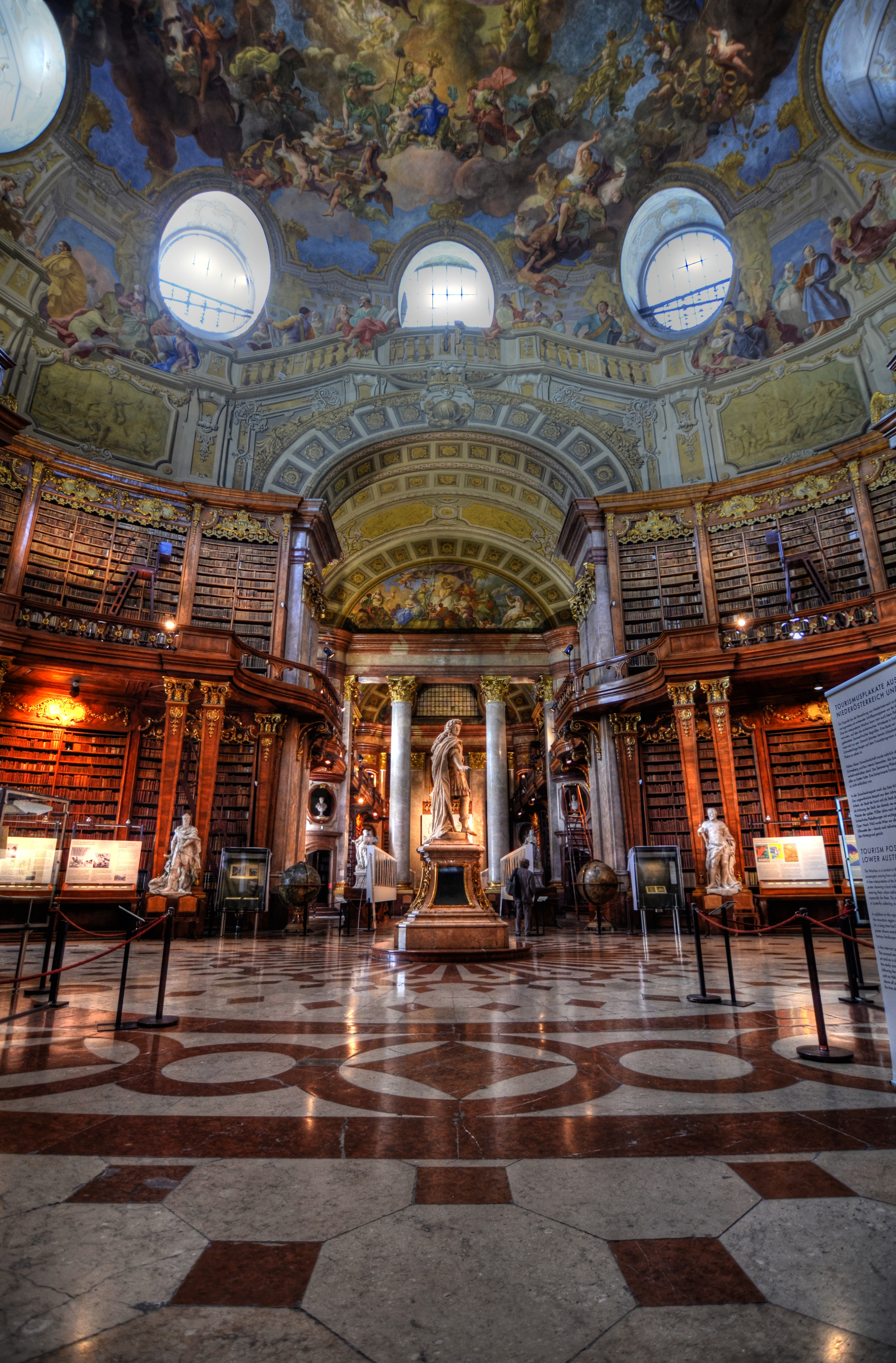
The Prunksaal, center of the old imperial library

The Prunksaal (English: State Hall) is the central structure of the old imperial library and part of the Hofburg palace. The wing is located in-between Josephsplatz to the north and the Burggarten to the south.

The books in the monastery of the Conventual Franciscans (Minoritenkloster) were stored here. The wing was begun in 1721 by Johann Bernhard Fischer von Erlach and finished after his death in 1723 by his son Joseph Emanuel.

The sculptures on the wing are by Lorenzo Mattielli. The hall is divided, after the original list of the books, into two opposite "war" and "peace" sides, which is reflected also in the wall frescoes, from Daniel Gran. The fresco in the central dome represents a kind of Apotheosis of Emperor Charles VI, whose image is held by Hercules and Apollo. Around the image of the emperor, several types of allegorical figures meet in a complicated theme, which symbolize the virtues of the Habsburgs and the wealth of their domains.

Located in the hall are marble statues of emperors with the statue of emperor Charles VI in its centre, created by the sculptors Peter Strudel and Paul Strudel. The four large globes are by Vincenzo Coronelli.

During the reign of Empress Maria Theresa, cracks started appearing in the dome. Court architect Nikolaus Pacassi soon strengthened the structure with an iron ring. The memorial fresco of Gran (in which the trace of a tear can be seen) was restored by Franz Anton Maulbertsch.

Also during her reign, the wing was extended on both ends, connecting the central Prunksaal with the Hofburg and St. Augustine's Church, forming Josefsplatz (Joseph Square).

== Collections ==
One of the major tasks of the Austrian National Library is the collection and archiving of all publications appearing in Austria (including electronic media). Depending on the law for the medium, four copies, and by other printing elements, two obligation copies each, must be delivered to the National Library by periodic printing elements appearing in Austria.

In addition, the library collects all works of Austrian authors appearing abroad, as well as such works which concern Austrians or the Austrian spirit and culture. Further publications from the foreign country are taken up with emphasis on the range of the Geisteswissenschaften. Tasks and services of the national library cover the development of the existence and their supply in the form of local-loan, remote-loan, and search services as well as Auskunfts, information and reproduction services.

The legally given general order for education is obeyed also by co-operation with universities, schools and adult education mechanisms.

Altogether, the library has more than seven million objects, of which approximately three million are printed.

=== Manuscripts and rare books ===
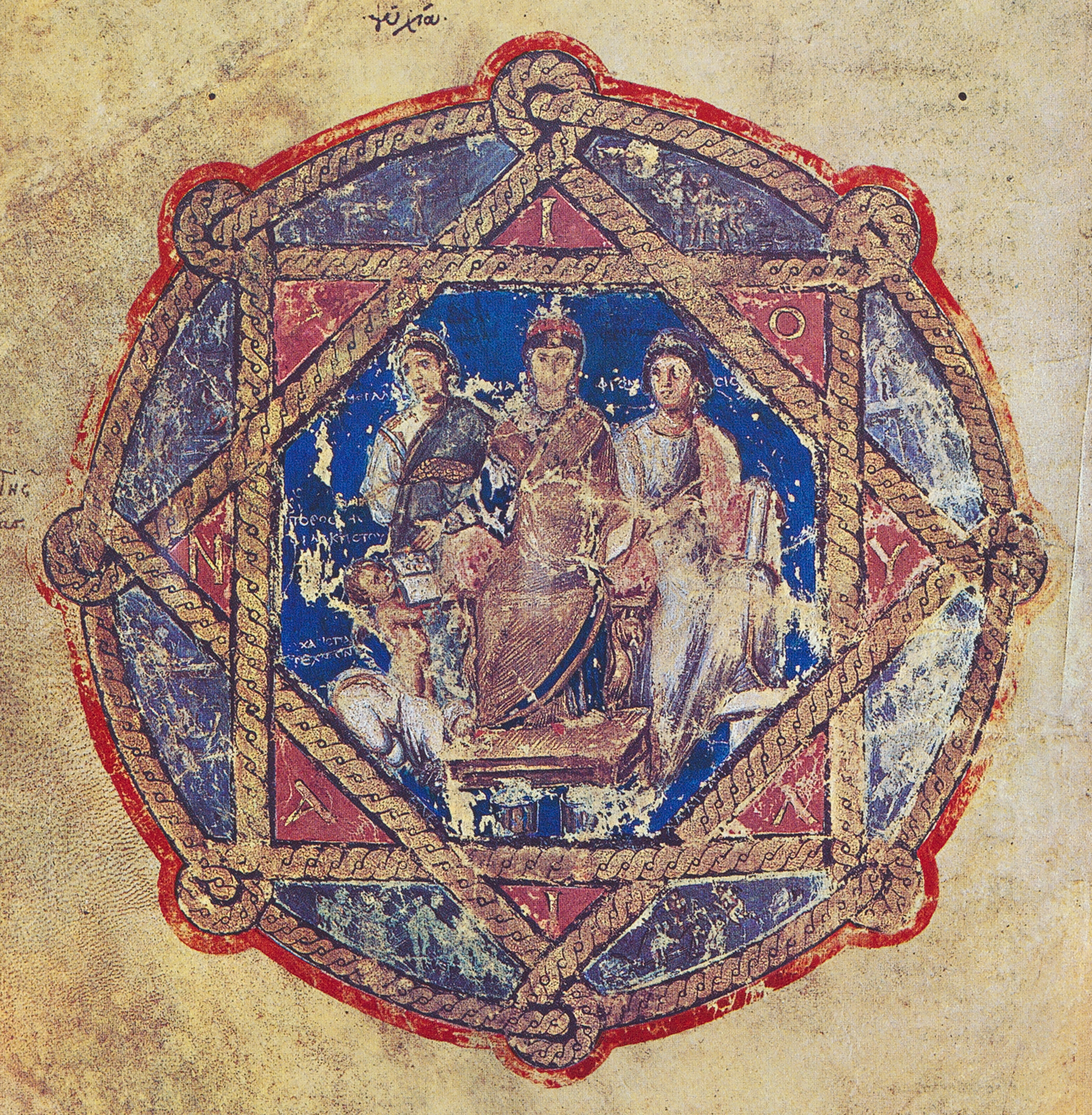
Page (fol. 6 verso) from the Vienna Dioscurides, depicting princess Juliana Anikia and allegories of Generosity and Intelligence

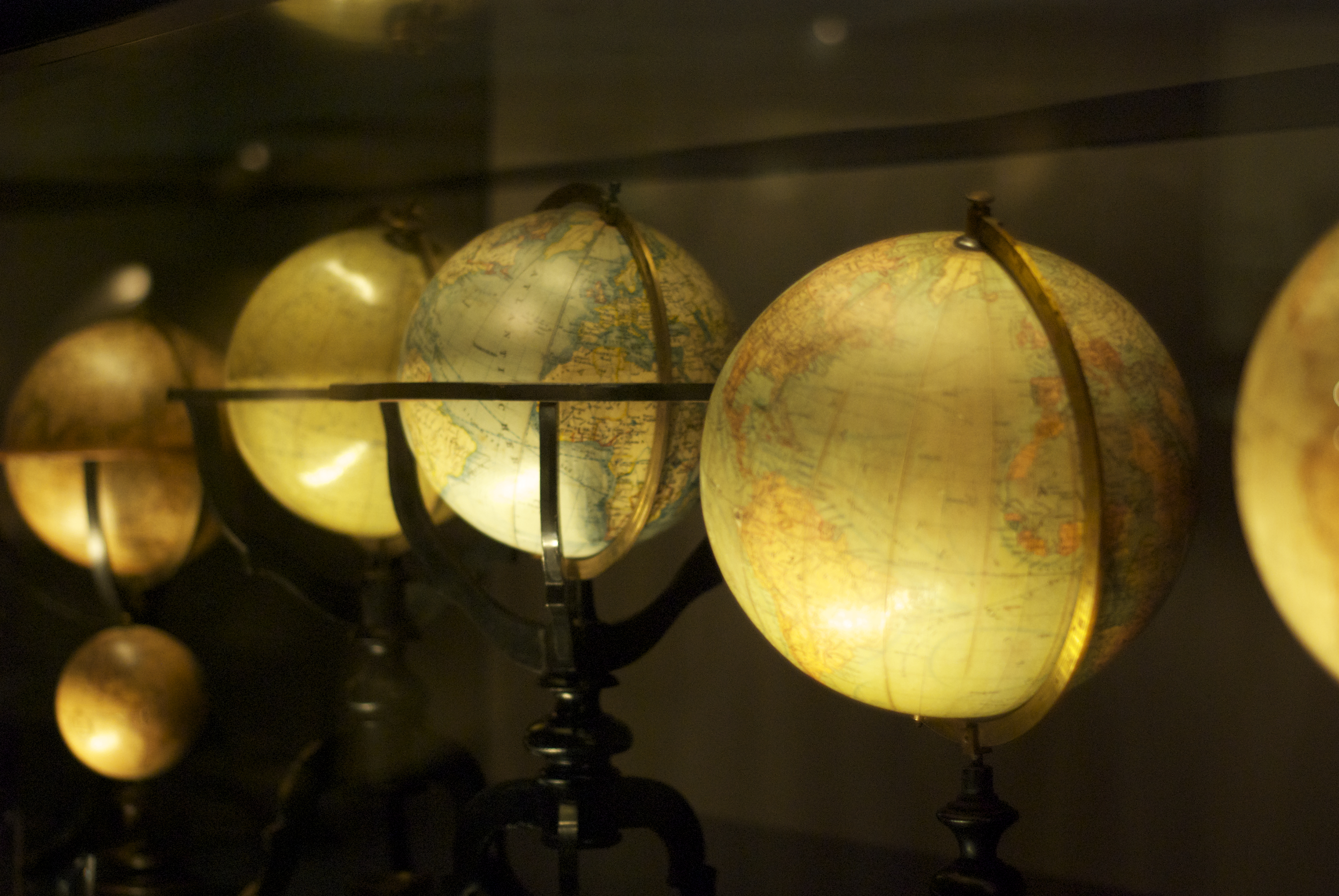
Globe collection, housed in the Palais Mollard-Clary

Dating from the 4th century CE to the present, this collection includes antique, medieval and modern manuscripts from almost every literate culture. Notable items in the collection include the 7th century Notitia ecclesiarum urbis Romae and the Vienna Dioscurides, the latter of which was inscribed on UNESCO's Memory of the World Programme Register in 1997 in recognition of its world significance and outstanding universal value.

=== Map collection and Globe Museum ===
The map collection includes maps back to the 16th century and it has existed since 1905. After the First World War, the collection of the Habsburgs was taken over, designated as the Habsburg "Family Estate Library" (Familien-Fideikommiss-Bibliothek).

The map collection includes the Globe Museum, containing over 380 globes, some dating back to the 16th century. It is the world's only public globe museum, and has been in existence since 1956. The principal part of the Globe Museum's inventory consists of globes which existed before 1850. There is also technical literature in the collection, plus similar instruments, such as armillary spheres.

The map collection also includes the 17th-century Atlas Blaeu-Van der Hem, a 50-volume set that consists of more than 2,400 maps, prints, and drawings. Considered the most beautiful and most remarkable atlas ever composed, it includes four volumes of manuscript maps and topographical drawings originally made for the Dutch East India Company (VOC). It was inscribed on UNESCO's Memory of the World Programme Register in 2003.

=== Papyrus collection and Papyrus Museum ===
During the 19th century, the papyrus collection became an important part of the library. The collection goes back to a private collection of Austrian Archduke Rainer, who gave the collection to Emperor Franz Joseph I of Austria on 18 August 1899. The papyrus collection contains about 180,000 objects from the period between that of the 15th century BCE to the 16th Century CE. Besides papyri the collection includes papers, records on clay tablets, inscribed wood and wax trays, stone tablets, leathers, textiles and bones, as well as gold, silver and bronze articles with inscriptions. The papyrus collection is the largest such collection worldwide, and was inscribed on UNESCO's Memory of the World Programme Register in 2001.

The Papyrus Museum, located in the library in the Neue Burg wing of the Hofburg Palace, has around 200 objects from the collection on display.

=== Music ===
Since 1826, the music collection has contained numerous scores and first-printings of works of well-known composers, such as Anton Bruckner and Richard Strauss. Numerous recordings such as records or CDs are kept as well. Among the music collection are also many handwritten notes of composers.

=== Incunabula, old and precious prints ===
Containing old and valuable printings, the collection of Incunabula is one of the five largest collections of historical block printing of the world. As an independent collection, it has existed since 1995 and ranks thereby among the youngest of the library. The collection covers approximately 8,000 incunabula (the fourth largest in existence worldwide), block printings from 1501 to 1850 (e.g. the Fugger newspapers), and bibliophile as well as rare and valuable printings without temporal restriction. The SIAWD collection has also been supplemented with Chinese and Japanese printings.

=== Planned languages and Esperanto Museum ===
The Department of Planned Languages and Esperanto Museum incorporates a collection of materials related to planned languages.

=== Women's and gender studies ===
The Department of the Library which collects, digitizes and works to promote publications on women and gender studies is known as Ariadne. Founded in 1992, the department digitized its materials in 2000 and works to improve the visibility of women's contributions to society and in the history of Austria.

=== Austrian Web Archive ===
The library has archived websites since 2009. Its themed collections are women's and gender studies, media, and politics; event collections include sites reflecting on 100 years since the First Austrian Republic, elections and the pandemic. Collection lists may be researched on the dedicated website and access to archived copies is possible on the premises of the library in Heldenplatz, and also the Administrative Library of the Austrian Federal Chancellery, Vorarlberger Landesbibliothek, University Library of Graz, Universitäts- und Landesbibliothek Tirol, Universitäts- und Landesbibliothek Salzburg and Wienbibliothek im Rathaus.

== Austrian National Library collections ==
- Department of Broadsheets, Posters and Ex Libris: 330,000 objects (broadsheets, posters and Ex Libris)
- Department of Manuscripts, Autographs and Closed Collections: From the 4th century to the present day: late antique, medieval and modern manuscripts from almost every literate culture.
- Department of Music: Austria's music archives, and great collection of autographs, it is also one of the largest libraries in the world.
- Austrian Literary Archives
- Picture Archive
- Department of Incunabula, Old and Precious Books:
  - incunabula (books printed before 1500),
  - printed works from the period 1501–1850 and
  - printed bibliophile rarissima of no specific period.
- Archives of the Austrian Folk Song Institute
- Austrian National Library Museums
- State Hall
- Globe Museum: 380 globes and scientific instruments including terrestrial and celestial globes made before 1850
- Papyrus Museum:
  - Papyri 137,864
  - Archaeological documents (without papyri) 50,769
  - Museum objects 5
  - Books and serials 14,049
  - Microforms 555
  - Audiovisual materials 2,292
  - Picture documents 16,944
- Department of Planned Languages and Esperanto Museum

== See also ==
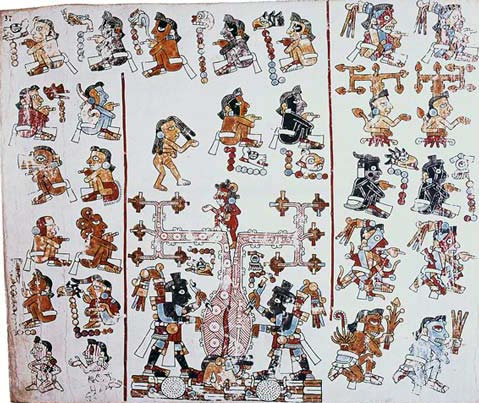
Fragment from Codex Vindobonesis

- Codex Vindobonensis B 11093
- Codex Vindobonensis Philos. 75
- Codex Vindobonensis Philos. 157
- Codex Vindobonensis Mexicanus I
- Codex Vindobonensis Lat. 502
- Fayyum Fragment (P. Vienna G. 2325)
