= Hugo Blotius =

Dutch scholar and librarian

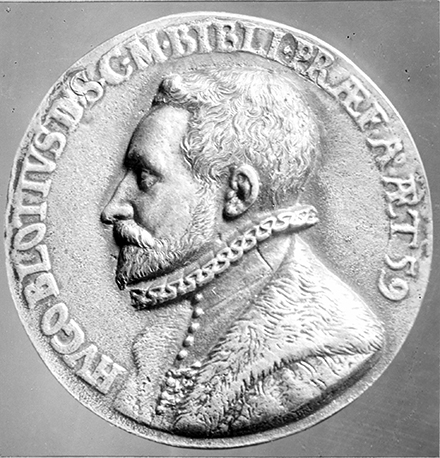
- Born: 1533; Delft, Netherlands
- Died: January 29, 1608 (aged 74–75); Vienna, Austria
- Known for: First head librarian of the Imperial Library

Hugo Blotius or Hugo de Bloote (1533, Delft – 29 January 1608, Vienna) was a Dutch scholar and librarian. He first became interested in librarianship while studying for a law degree in Orléans between 1566 and 1567. In 1575, Emperor Maximilian II appointed him the first head librarian of the Imperial Library.
