= Church of St Aldhelm and St Eadburgha, Broadway =

Church in Somerset, England

Church of St Aldhelm and St Eadburgha
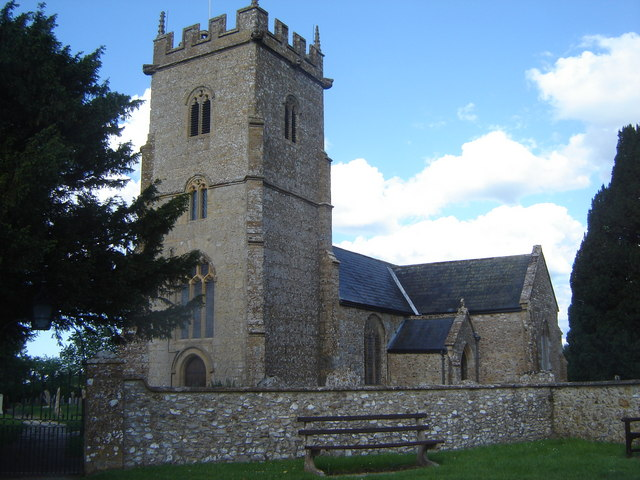

- Location within Somerset
- 50°56′19″N 2°57′16″W
- Location: Broadway, Somerset, England

History
- Built: 13th century

Listed Building – Grade I
- Official name: Church of St Aldhelm and St Eadburgha
- Designated: 4 February 1958
- Reference no.: 1248192

The Church of St Aldhelm and St Eadburgha in Broadway, Somerset, England dates from the 13th century, and has been designated by English Heritage as a grade I listed building.

The dedication is unusual. St Aldhelm (c. 639-25 May 709), was Abbot of Malmesbury Abbey, Bishop of Sherborne, Latin poet and Anglo-Saxon literature scholar, was born before the middle of the 7th century.

According to the Historic England website, the other dedication is to St. Eadburh of Winchester, granddaughter of King Alfred. Most other churches dedicated to her are in the vicinity of Pershore Abbey, Worcestershire, where some of her remains were transferred after her death: a cult grew up around her veneration. The second dedication to St Eadburgha may be relatively modern: A Topographical Dictionary of England (1848) lists it as being dedicated to St. Aldelme (sic) only.

Old English and Medieval spellings are found in various forms, and St. Eadburgha is probably not to be confused with Edburga of Bicester, an English saint from the 7th century and a daughter of King Penda of Mercia. There are thought to be only two churches dedicated to her, in Bicester and Stratton Audley, both in Oxfordshire.

The church's isolated position away from the village is thought to be because of an outbreak of the plague.

The churchyard cross is also from the 13th century.

The church also still houses the original wooden bier used at funerals over a century ago.

== See also ==
- List of Grade I listed buildings in South Somerset
- List of towers in Somerset
- List of ecclesiastical parishes in the Diocese of Bath and Wells
