= St Aldhelm's Roman Catholic Church, Malmesbury =

St Aldhelm's Roman Catholic Church
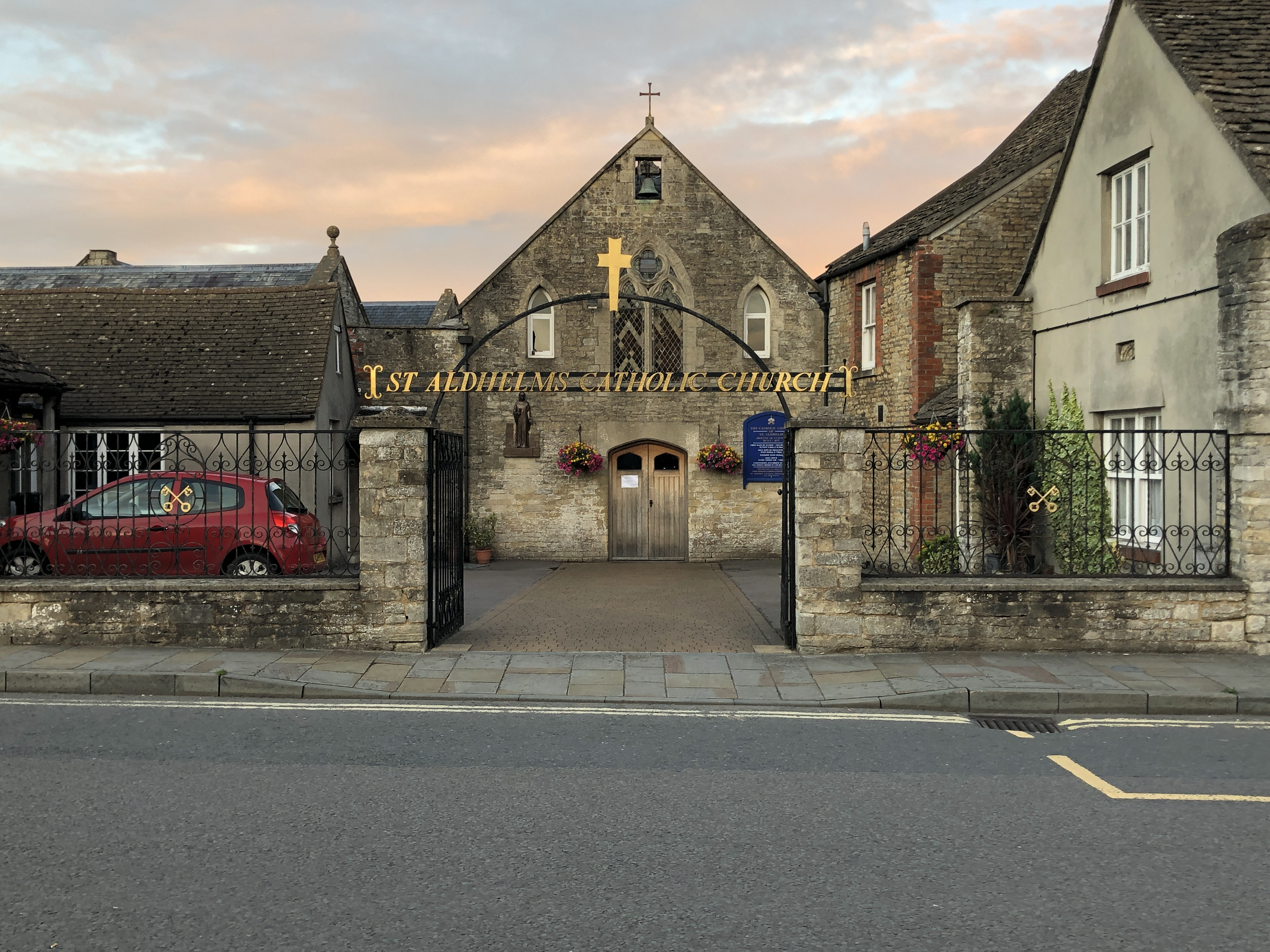
- St Aldhelm's Church from Cross Hayes

- Location within Wiltshire Location within England
- 51.583°N 2.096°W
- OS grid reference: ST 93413 87131
- Location: Malmesbury, Wiltshire
- Address: 26 Cross Hayes, SN16 9BG
- Country: England
- Denomination: Catholic Church
- Website: www.saintaldhelms.com

History
- Founded: 1875
- Founders: Father Francois Larive MSFS; Captain Charles Dewell
- Dedication: St Aldhelm

Administration
- Province: Ecclesiastical province of Birmingham
- Metropolis: Archdiocese of Birmingham
- Diocese: Diocese of Clifton
- Deanery: St Aldhelm
- Parish: Malmesbury

Clergy
- Priest: Fr Tomas Kulandaisamy MSFS

St Aldhelm's Presbytery
- Interactive map of St Aldhelm's Presbytery

Listed Building – Grade II
- Official name: St Aldhelm's Presbytery
- Designated: 30 June 1976
- Reference no.: 1269513

St Aldhelm's Roman Catholic Church in Malmesbury, Wiltshire, England is a Roman Catholic Church built in 1875. The church is dedicated to St Aldhelm who lived in Malmesbury and was the abbot at nearby Malmesbury Abbey. The attached presbytery is a Grade II listed building.

== Buildings ==
St Aldhelm's Roman Catholic Church is built in uncoursed stone with ashlar dressings, in 14th-century gothic style. It is set back from Cross Hayes, the town's former marketplace (now a car park), to which it presents its west façade where a large two-light trefoil-headed window is flanked by two plain lancets.

Immediately south of the courtyard is the presbytery. The Grade II listed building incorporates a single-storey 19th-century former stable to Cross Hayes House, built in squared limestone, with a later rear extension in limestone rubble.

In 2022, a stained-glass window dedicated to Blessed Carlo Acutis was installed in the church, with the aim of connecting with younger parishioners. The church has seen an increase in visitors since May 2024, when it was announced that Acutis would be canonised.

In 2023, planning permission was requested to demolish the outbuildings located to the north of the church's courtyard and replace them with a new parish hall. The planned building is intended to replace the existing clubroom, modernise the facilities and provide more space for the growing church community. Full planning permission was granted by Wiltshire Council in April 2024, with building work beginning in October 2025.

== History ==
The church was founded in 1875 by French priest Francois Larive MSFS, who was the first Missionary of St Francis de Sales to work in England. The idea of founding a church in Malmesbury was given to him by Captain Charles Goddard Dewell of the 91st Argyllshire Regiment of Foot, who was born and raised in Malmesbury. The two met in 1858 while Dewell was posted to the village of Kamptee in India; he had recently been baptised into the Roman Catholic Church after being converted to Catholicism following falling ill while serving in Italy. He wanted to start a church in his home town, so after much discussion with Larive, the two decided to set up a church in Malmesbury.

In 1861, Larive and Dewell came to Malmesbury, and they decided on a site for the church: Cross Hayes House, which was owned by Dewell. There were delays with the transfer of the lease of the house, so it did not become available until 1867. It was in that year that Dewell became a lay brother in the Society of Jesus and opened a school, despite fierce local opposition, including from the local member of parliament. A temporary church was set up on newly purchased adjoining land in 1869, and used until the present church was opened on 1 July 1875. Father Larive dedicated the church to St Aldhelm, who was the patron saint of the town and was the founder and first abbot at the nearby Malmesbury Abbey from 675 to 705.

The site of the old church became St. Joseph's Primary School, run by and named after the Sisters of St Joseph of Annecy with whom Larive had previously worked. The school remained there until 1933 when it moved to its current site on Holloway Hill.

== Clergy ==
Since its foundation, the parish has been continuously ministered by priests from the Missionaries of St. Francis de Sales; Larive was the order's first resident priest in England, and the mission at Malmesbury is regarded as the roots of the order's English Province. The order has also provided a number of assistant priests. As of 2025, the parish priest is supported by permanent deacons.

=== Parish priests ===
- Fr François Larive MSFS (1867–1884)
- Fr François Decompoix MSFS (1885–1917)
- Fr Thomas Morrin MSFS (1917–1924)
- Fr Alphonse Gorod MSFS (1925–1933)
- Fr Joseph Anthonioz MSFS (1934–1936)
- Fr Elie Meynet MSFS (1937–1939)
- Fr Basil Harrison MSFS (1940–1943)
- Fr James Lahiff MSFS (1944–1945)
- Fr James Gamble MSFS (1946)
- Fr Alphonse Gorod MSFS (1947)
- Fr Basil Harrison MSFS (1948–1955)
- Fr Patrick L Kinoulty MSFS (1956–1961)
- Fr James Lahiff MSFS (1962–1964)
- Fr George O'Sullivan MSFS (1965–1984)
- Fr Martin Griffin MSFS (1985)
- Fr Kevin O'Neill MSFS (1986)
- Fr Alan Blackford MSFS (1987)
- Fr George O'Sullivan MSFS (1988–2013)
- Fr Saji Matthew MSFS (2013–2016)
- Fr Martin Griffin MSFS (2016–2019)
- Fr Thomas Kulandaisamy MSFS (2019–)

=== Assistant priests and permanent deacons ===
- Fr Louis Valluet MSFS (1897, 1925)
- Fr Aloysio Valluet MSFS (1899)
- Fr Jean Prunier MSFS (1903)
- Fr Lucien Favrat MSFS (1911)
- Fr Camille Obserson MSFS (1922)
- Fr Joseph Baker MSFS (1936)
- Fr Francis Ford MSFS (1938, 1952–1955)
- Fr Ronald Besant MSFS (1947–1950)
- Fr Patrick Cassidy MSFS (1951)
- Fr Norman Franks MSFS (1956–1958)
- Fr Anthony McCabe MSFS (1957, 1960–1961)
- Fr William Hughes MSFS (1959)
- Fr Arthur Williams MSFS (1962–1964)
- Fr Basil Harrison MSFS (1989–1991)
- Deacon Robin Littlewood (1989, 1992–1996)
- Deacon Steve Boughton (2013–)
- Deacon Rémi Thivet (2025–)
