= Boveridge =

Hamlet in Dorset, England

Coordinates: 50.92°N 01.91°W

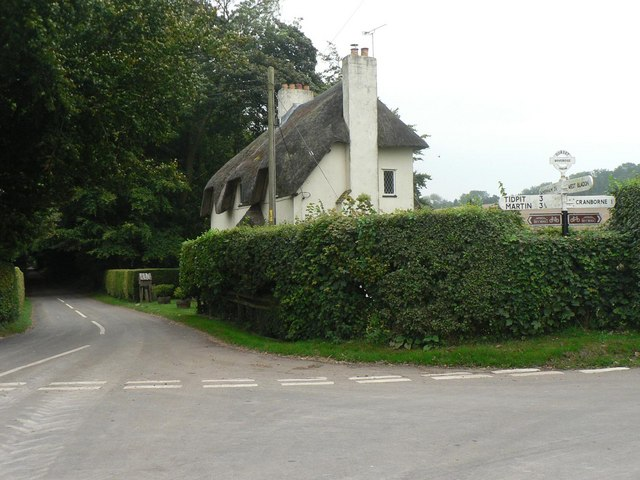
- Boveridge

- Location within Dorset
- OS grid reference: SU0614
- Civil parish: Cranborne
- Unitary authority: Dorset
- Ceremonial county: Dorset
- Region: South West
- Country: England
- Sovereign state: United Kingdom
- Post town: Wimborne
- Postcode district: BH21
- Dialling code: 01725
- Police: Dorset
- Fire: Dorset and Wiltshire
- Ambulance: South Western

Boveridge is a hamlet in Dorset, England about 1 mile (1.6 km) north of Cranborne, 12 miles (19 km) south-west of Salisbury, Wiltshire, and 10 miles (16 km) north-east of Wimborne Minster, Dorset.

== Notable buildings ==
Boveridge House, a grade II listed building was designed by William Evans of Wimborne and built some time after 1788 for Henry Brouncker. The Ordnance Survey surveyor's Drawing (1807–1808) shows the house set in a strip of pleasure grounds and woodland extending from north-west to south-east. There had been a farm on the site of an older mansion. In 1920, Charles Wilfred Gordon and his wife, an enthusiastic amateur gardener, commissioned Thomas Mawson to provide plans for new formal gardens around the house. Gertrude Jekyll provided planting plans which were implemented in the 1920s. The house is adjacent to the mid-19th century Boveridge Farm. Boveridge Farm is north-west of the house, and is also grade II listed.

In the 1890s the estate was sold to Sir George Thursby and later sold again to Charles Wilfred Gordon. It remained the property of the Gordon family until 1961 when it was bought by the Combe family of Cobham Park and then Viscount Cranborne, owner of nearby Cranborne Manor. The house and grounds were let to a special education school and remain in use for educational purposes. Renovation of the grounds began in 1998.

Boveridge House School, also known as The Philip Green Memorial School, occupied Boveridge House and the grounds from 1966 to 2014. Students were admitted from the age of 11 for boarders, or from age 9 for day pupils. The school could accommodate up to 44 boarding students, both male and female, with moderate to severe learning difficulties and communication problems. Students could be admitted from any Local Education Authority or private source.

Aurora Boveridge College, an independent specialist day and residential further education college and part of the larger Aurora Group, has occupied Boveridge House since 1 September 2017. It supports young people who may have a diagnosis of autism, anxiety, or social, emotional or mental health needs. They admit students aged 16 – 25 in flexible placements. There is also a secondary 11-16 school in the grounds, The Beeches.

The former St Aldhelm's Church was built in 1838 as a chapel of ease to the Church of St Mary and St Bartholomew in Cranborne. It is now a private residence.
