= St Aldhelm's Church, Boveridge =

Church in Dorset, England

St Aldhelm's Church
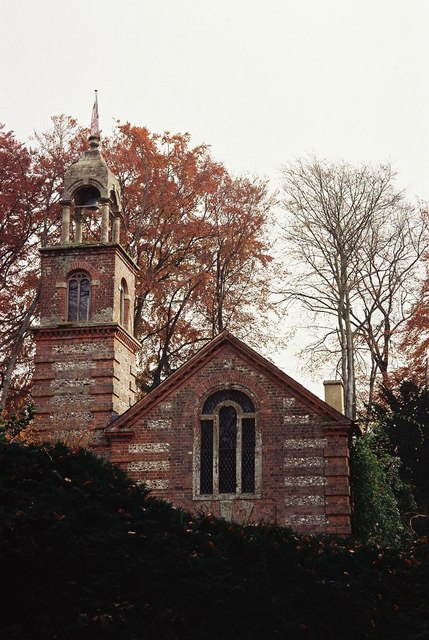

Religion
- Affiliation: Church of England
- Ecclesiastical or organizational status: Redundant

Location
- Location: Boveridge, Dorset, England
- Interactive map of St Aldhelm's Church
- Coordinates: 50.9312°N 1.9136°W

Architecture
- Type: Church
- Completed: 1838

St Aldhelm's Church is a former Church of England church in Boveridge, Dorset, England. It was built at the expense of Richard Brouncker in 1838 and became redundant in 1980. The Grade II listed building is now a private residence.

== History ==
A chapel serving Boveridge is known to have existed as early as 1595, when one was mentioned in a will. During the early 16th century, Thomas Hooper, the then-owner of the Boveridge estate, provided the village with an almshouse. His son, Edward Hooper, who died in 1661, bequeathed additional funds and land for the benefit of three poor widows. He also bequeathed an additional sum to provide the village with a minister to bring Christian teachings to the poorer inhabitants at the village chapel. In 1708, a new chapel was built near Boveridge Farm by Edward Hooper and services were held by the vicar of Cranborne. A new church was built at the expense of Richard Brouncker of the Boveridge estate in 1838, on a site considered more convenient for the inhabitants.

The church underwent restoration in 1896 for an approximate cost of £100, with the work being carried out by Mr. T. Coombe of Cranborne. It was reopened and dedicated to St. Aldhelm by the Archdeacon of Dorset, the Ven. Francis Sowter, on 8 October 1896. The restoration included repainting the walls with distemper, cleaning and repairing the windows, and replacing the stone flooring with wooden blocks. The height of the chancel floor was raised from that of the nave and the communion table received its own platform. The church's square pews, which had originally come from St Thomas' Church in Salisbury, were replaced with new benches of carved oak, which provided seating for approximately 100 people. The wooden communion rails were also removed and a new pulpit and reading desk constructed from them.

St Aldhelm's was declared redundant by the Church of England on 13 October 1980. The Church Commissioners were granted permission in 1981 to change the building's use from redundant church to single dwelling. The building was then sold to a private owner and a conversion scheme granted planning permission in 1982. In 1990, permission was granted for further alterations and extension work to be made.

== Architecture ==
St Aldhelm's is built of banded brick and flint with quoins and dressings of brick and ashlar stone, and slate roofs. It is made up of a nave, chancel, north chapel and north-west tower. The square tower is surmounted by a stone cupola, made up of four columns and a dome, and contains one bell.

Prior to its redundancy, fittings recorded at the church included a font of Portland stone, believed to date to 1838, 16th and 17th century penelling reset on the walls of the chancel and nave, and arms of the Hooper and Brouncker families. A stone wall tablet of 1825 to Henry Brouncker and others of the Brouncker family was located in the north chapel.
