= Malmesbury Hundred =

Ancient subdivision of Wiltshire, United Kingdom

Coordinates: 51.58°N 2.10°W

Malmesbury was a hundred of the English county of Wiltshire, lying in the north of the county and centring on the historic borough and market town of Malmesbury. The hundred of Malmesbury represents parishes that were within the Domesday hundreds of Chedglow and Startley, which were held at farm by the Abbot of Malmesbury.

== Extent ==
The hundred contained the parishes of Bremilham, Brinkworth, Brokenborough, Charlton, Crudwell, Dauntsey, Draycot Cerne, Foxley, Garsdon, Hankerton, Hullavington, Lea and Cleverton, Malmesbury (including Corston and Rodbourne), Norton, Oaksey, Seagry, Great Somerford, Little Somerford, Stanton St Quintin, Sutton Benger, and Westport.

In 1086 the ancient hundred of Chedglow had contained the parishes of:

- Ashley
- Brokenborough
- Charlton
- Crudwell
- Garsdon
- Hankerton
- Kemble
- Lea
- Minety
- Long Newnton
- Oaksey
- Poole Keynes

In 1086 the ancient hundred of Startley contained the parishes of:

- Brinkworth
- Christian Malford
- Dauntsey
- Draycot Cerne
- Foxley
- Hullavington
- Norton
- Seagry
- Somerford
- Great Somerford
- Little Somerford
- Sutton Benger
