= North Wiltshire =

Former local government district in Wiltshire, England

Coordinates: 51.461°N 2.119°W

North Wiltshire District
- Shown within Wiltshire
- Area
- 296.40 sq mi (767.68 km^{2}) (Ranked 96th)
- Population
  - 2004 (est.): 128,300
- History
  - Created: 1 April 1974
  - Abolished: 1 April 2009
  - Succeeded by: Wiltshire Council
- Status: District
- ONS code: 46UC
- Government: North Wiltshire District Council
  - Type: Leader & Cabinet
  - HQ: Chippenham
- Contained within
  - Region: South West England
  - Admin. County: Wiltshire

North Wiltshire was a local government district in Wiltshire, England, between 1974 and 2009, when it was superseded by the unitary area of Wiltshire.

The district was formed on 1 April 1974 by a merger of the municipal boroughs of Calne, Chippenham and Malmesbury, along with Calne and Chippenham Rural District, Cricklade and Wootton Bassett Rural District and Malmesbury Rural District. It shared its name with the North Wiltshire parliamentary constituency, the boundaries of which were coterminous with that of the district until 1997. The district was the second tier of local government, below Wiltshire County Council.

The new body's headquarters were in central Chippenham at Bewley House, a large office block which had been built in 1967 for Calne and Chippenham Rural District Council. They later moved to newly built offices at Monkton Park, another site in the town centre, overlooking the River Avon.

The district was abolished on 1 April 2009 as part of the structural changes to local government in England, when its functions were taken over by the county council, which became a unitary authority and was renamed Wiltshire Council.

== Post-abolition events ==
Wiltshire Council retained the Monkton Park building as a satellite of its main offices at County Hall, Trowbridge.

Some local services, which had been the responsibility of the district council and had passed in 2009 to Wiltshire Council, were later transferred to the larger town and parish councils. Thus, by 2019, Chippenham Town Council had taken charge of a large park, a community centre and play areas, as well as services such as grounds maintenance and street cleaning.

== Parishes ==
The district contained the following civil parishes:

- Ashton Keynes
- Biddlestone, Box, Braydon, Bremhill, Brinkworth, Broad Town, Brokenborough
- Calne, Calne Without, Castle Combe, Charlton, Brinkworth, Cherhill, Chippenham, Chippenham Without, Christian Malford, Clyffe Pypard, Colerne, Compton Bassett, Corsham, Cricklade, Crudwell
- Dauntsey
- Easton Grey
- Great Somerford, Grittleton
- Hankerton, Heddington, Hilmarton, Hullavington
- Kington Langley, Kington St Michael
- Lacock, Langley Burrell Without, Latton, Lea and Cleverton, Leigh, Little Somerford, Luckington, Lydiard Millicent, Lydiard Tregoze, Lyneham and Bradenstoke
- Malmesbury, Marston Maisey, Minety
- Nettleton, North Wraxall, Norton
- Oaksey
- Purton
- Seagry, Sherston, Sopworth, St Paul Malmesbury Without, Stanton St Quintin, Sutton Benger
- Tockenham
- Wootton Bassett
- Yatton Keynell

== See also ==
- North Wiltshire District Council elections
