= Rodbourne, St Paul Malmesbury Without =

Village in Wiltshire, England

Coordinates: 51°32′57″N 2°05′44″W

Rodbourne
- Village
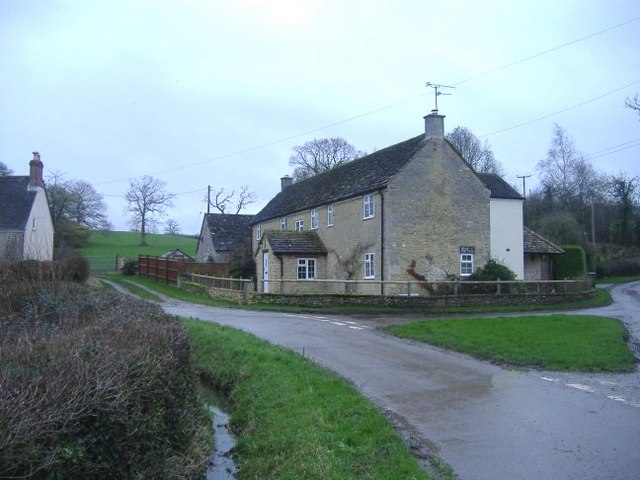
- Rodbourne Bottom in 2007

- Location within Wiltshire
- Civil parish: St Paul Malmesbury Without
- Unitary authority: Wiltshire
- Ceremonial county: Wiltshire
- Region: South West
- Country: England
- Sovereign state: United Kingdom
- Post town: Malmesbury
- Postcode district: SN16
- Dialling code: 01666
- Police: Wiltshire
- Fire: Dorset and Wiltshire
- Ambulance: South Western
- UK Parliament: South Cotswolds

Rodbourne is a small village in Wiltshire, England, in the civil parish of St Paul Malmesbury Without about 2.5 miles (4.0 km) south of the town of Malmesbury. The hamlet of Rodbourne Bottom is 0.5 miles (0.80 km) south of the village.

The Rodbourne Brook, a tributary of the River Avon, flows in a northeasterly direction between Rodbourne and Rodbourne Bottom. Harries Ground, near Rodbourne Bottom, is a biological Site of Special Scientific Interest.

== History ==
An estate at Rodbourne was held by Malmesbury Abbey from either 701 or 956. Rodbourne later became a tithing in the southeast of Malmesbury parish, its boundaries – little changed since 1281 – including the Rodbourne Brook to the south.

After the Dissolution, the Crown granted the manor to William Stumpe, a leading Malmesbury cloth merchant and officeholder. Later owners included Walter Hungerford (from 1720) and Sir John Pollen (from 1816). The Pollens (later, Hungerford Pollens) lived at Rodbourne House, a late 17th or early 18th century country house, extended and altered in 1859. In that century they rebuilt much of the village and the family continued to own some land in 1987.

The population peaked in the mid-19th century, with 173 recorded at the 1851 census, but then declined. Malmesbury municipal borough was created in 1886, and in 1894 the remainder of Malmesbury parish, including Rodbourne, was renamed St Paul Malmesbury Without.

A Church of England school was built in 1851 and later extended, to serve both Rodbourne and Corston; average attendance in 1885/6 was 63. Numbers declined from the 1930s and the school closed in 1971.

The South Wales Main Line, built in 1903, passes between Rodbourne and Rodbourne Bottom. The local stations at Hullavington and Little Somerford were closed in 1961.

== Church ==
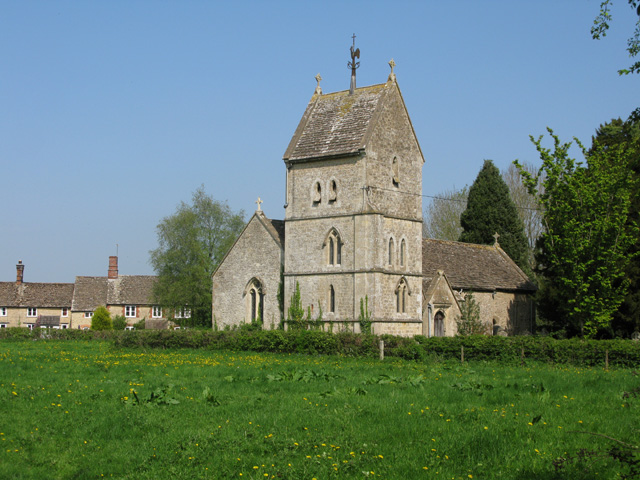
Holy Rood church

The Anglican Church of the Holy Rood is Grade II* listed. The narrow nave is from the 12th century and the chancel from the 13th, both in coursed rubble. Features of the nave are the narrow windows and the north and south doors; the tympanum over the south door, now inside a 15th-century porch, has a tree of life carving.

The church was lightly restored in 1849, and in 1862 the bulky three-stage tower with saddleback roof was added. Inside is an unusual stone seat, possibly from the 13th century. Stained glass made by Morris & Co. in the 1860s was designed by Ford Madox Brown and Dante Gabriel Rossetti.

Anciently a chapelry of St Paul's at Malmesbury, in 1881 a vicar was appointed to the district chapelry of Corston with Rodbourne. In 1951 the benefice was held in plurality with that of Foxley with Bremilham, and in 1986 was united with Great Somerford, Little Somerford and Seagry. Today the church is part of the Malmesbury and Upper Avon group.
