= Great Somerford Halt railway station =

Former railway station in England

Great Somerford Halt

General information
- Location: Great Somerford, Wiltshire; England
- Coordinates: 51.5482°N 2.0512°W

Other information
- Status: Disused

History
- Original company: Malmesbury Railway
- Pre-grouping: Great Western Railway
- Post-grouping: Great Western Railway

Key dates
- 18 December 1877: Opened as Somerford
- 1 January 1903: Renamed Great Somerford
- 22 May 1922: Renamed Great Somerford Halt
- 17 July 1933: Closed
Location

Great Somerford Halt was a station on the Malmesbury Branch Line of the Great Western Railway in Wiltshire, England. It was open from 1877 to 1933 for passengers, and 1879 to 1922 for goods.

== History ==
The station, at first named Somerford, was opened in December 1877 as part of the Malmesbury branch which left the Great Western Main Line at Dauntsey, 2 1/2 miles (4.0 km) to the southeast. The station was on the road to Little Somerford and separated from the northern edge of Great Somerford village by the River Avon. A small goods yard and siding were in use from January 1879.

The name of the station was changed to Great Somerford in 1903 when the GWR opened a more direct route to South Wales, the South Wales Main Line which left the earlier main line at Royal Wootton Bassett and passed half a mile (900 metres) to the north near Little Somerford, where a new station was built. The reduction in traffic led to changes in 1922 at Great Somerford: the goods yard closed and staff were withdrawn from the station, which was now named Great Somerford Halt.

In 1933, Little Somerford station was linked to the Malmesbury branch and became the junction station. The line south to Dauntsey, along with Great Somerford Halt, was closed on 17 July 1933, as usage of the halt had declined to an average of one passenger per two trains. The track as far south as Great Somerford was retained until 1959 and used for storage of rolling stock; the track further south had been lifted by 1949.

== Description ==
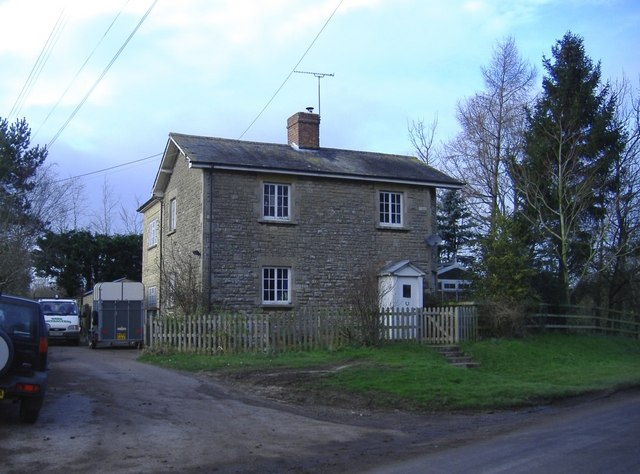
Former station master's house, Great Somerford

The site of the station and goods yard is now occupied by a sewage works. The station master's house, next to the road, survives.

| Preceding station | Disused railways | Following station |
|---|---|---|
| Malmesbury | Great Western Railway; Malmesbury Branch | Dauntsey |
