= Little Somerford railway station =

Disused railway station in Little Somerford, Wiltshire

Little Somerford
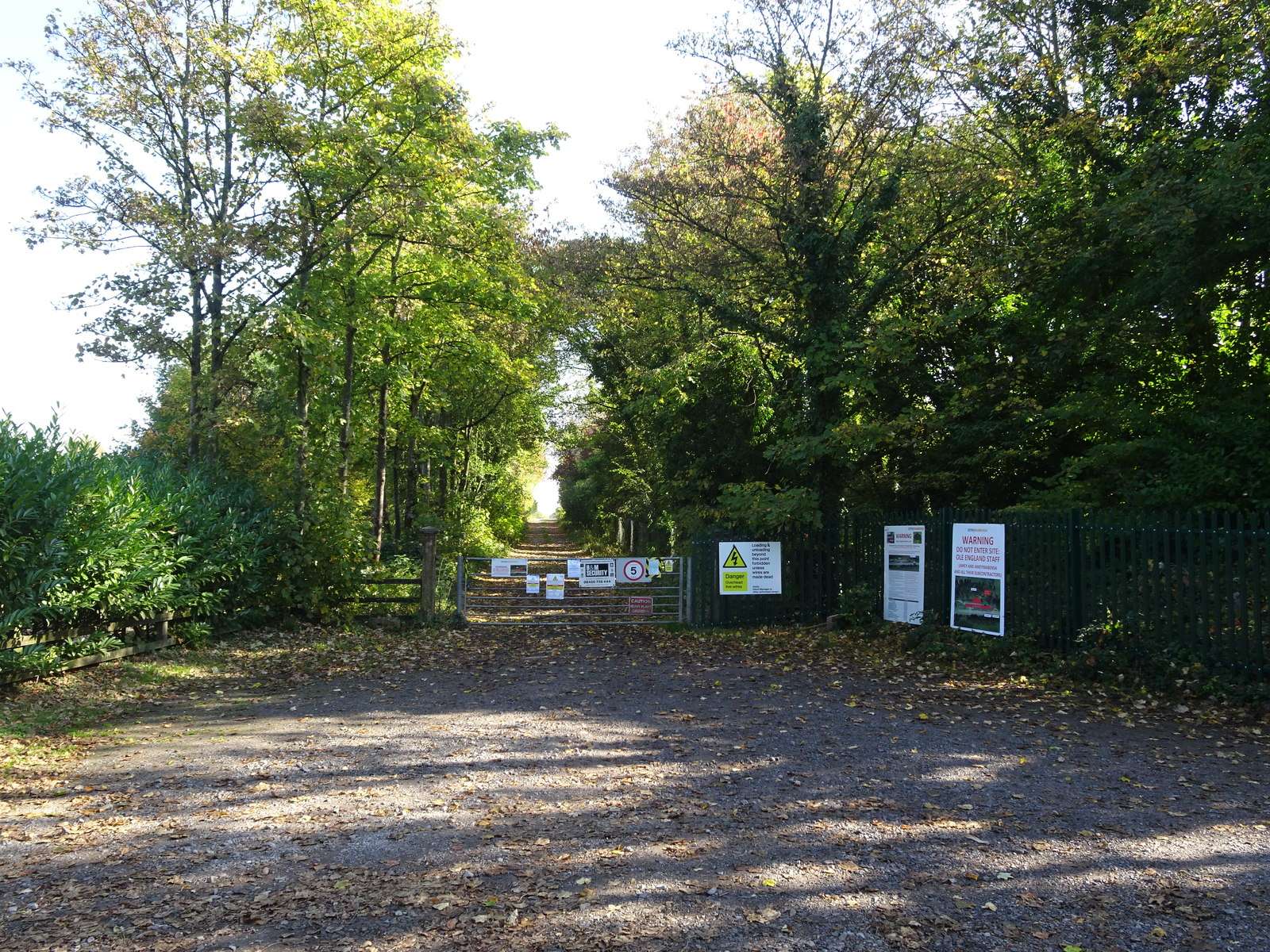
- The site of the station in 2018

General information
- Location: Little Somerford, Wiltshire; England
- Coordinates: 51.5563°N 2.0478°W
- Grid reference: ST968842
- Platforms: 2

Other information
- Status: Disused

History
- Original company: Great Western Railway

Key dates
- 1 July 1903: Opened
- 3 April 1961: Closed to passengers
- 1963: Closed completely
Location

Little Somerford railway station served the village of Little Somerford, Wiltshire, England from 1903 to 1963. It was on the South Wales Main Line and served as the junction for the Malmesbury branch line from 1933.

== History ==
When the Malmesbury branch line was opened in 1877, it left the Great Western Main Line at Dauntsey and had one intermediate station just north of Great Somerford. In 1903 the Great Western Railway opened the South Wales Main Line which provided a more direct route to South Wales, passing close to the south of Little Somerford village and to the north of the earlier line. A small station at Little Somerford was opened on the day the line was opened to passengers, 1 July 1903.

In 1933 the connection of the branch to the main line network was altered so that the branch began at Little Somerford, and the section south to Dauntsey was closed. Thus from 17 July 1933 Little Somerford became a junction, until the branch was closed (to passengers in September 1951 and completely in November 1962). Main line passenger service at the station was withdrawn in April 1961 and goods traffic in June 1963.

Preceding station	National Rail	Following station
Brinkworth; Line open, station closed	Great Western Railway; South Wales Main Line	Hullavington; Line open, station closed

Preceding station	Disused railways	Following station
Terminus	Great Western Railway; Malmesbury branch line	Malmesbury; Line and station closed
