= Dauntsey =

Village in Wiltshire, England

Coordinates: 51.536°N 2.011°W

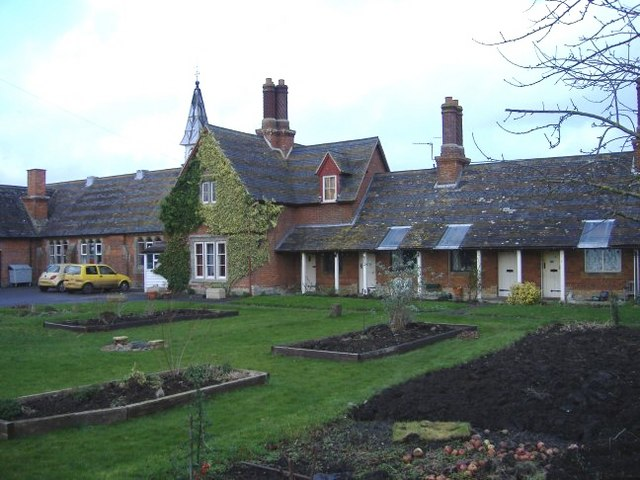
- 19th-century school and almshouses, Dauntsey

- Location within Wiltshire
- Population: 581 (in 2011)
- OS grid reference: ST993819
- Unitary authority: Wiltshire
- Ceremonial county: Wiltshire
- Region: South West
- Country: England
- Sovereign state: United Kingdom
- Post town: CHIPPENHAM
- Postcode district: SN15
- Dialling code: 01249; 01666
- Police: Wiltshire
- Fire: Dorset and Wiltshire
- Ambulance: South Western
- UK Parliament: South Cotswolds
- Website: Parish Council

Dauntsey is a village and civil parish in Wiltshire, England. It gives its name to the Dauntsey Vale in which it lies. The village is set on slightly higher ground in the floodplain of the upper Bristol Avon.

Today, the parish is split by the M4 motorway, with a chain of historic smaller settlements spread either side. Dauntsey Green is north of the motorway, along with Dauntsey Church at the entrance to Dauntsey Park; to the south are Greenman's Lane, Sodom and Dauntsey Lock. Dauntsey Lock is on the Wilts & Berks Canal (presently being restored), the course of which runs alongside the Bristol-London mainline railway.

== History ==
Malmesbury Abbey was granted an estate at Dauntsey in 850, and the Domesday Book of 1086 recorded a settlement of 26 households. The Brinkworth Brook defined the northern boundary of the parish, and the Avon most of the western; to the south the natural boundary is the ridge which forms the southern limit of the Vale.

Dauntsey Park House, north of the church and overlooking the Avon, has a 14th-century core; it was remodelled in the late 17th century or early 18th, and again c. 1800. The house is a Grade II* listed building. To the north, on the road to Little Somerford, are Home Idover Farmhouse (late 18th) and Idover Demesne Farmhouse (early 19th, a remodelling of an earlier building).

Sir Henry Danvers left land for a school and almshouse, together with further land to provide an income to maintain the school, in his will of 1645. The school was built c. 1667 and continued in use until it was replaced by a National School, built 1864–1866.

== Descent of the manor ==
=== Dauntsey family ===
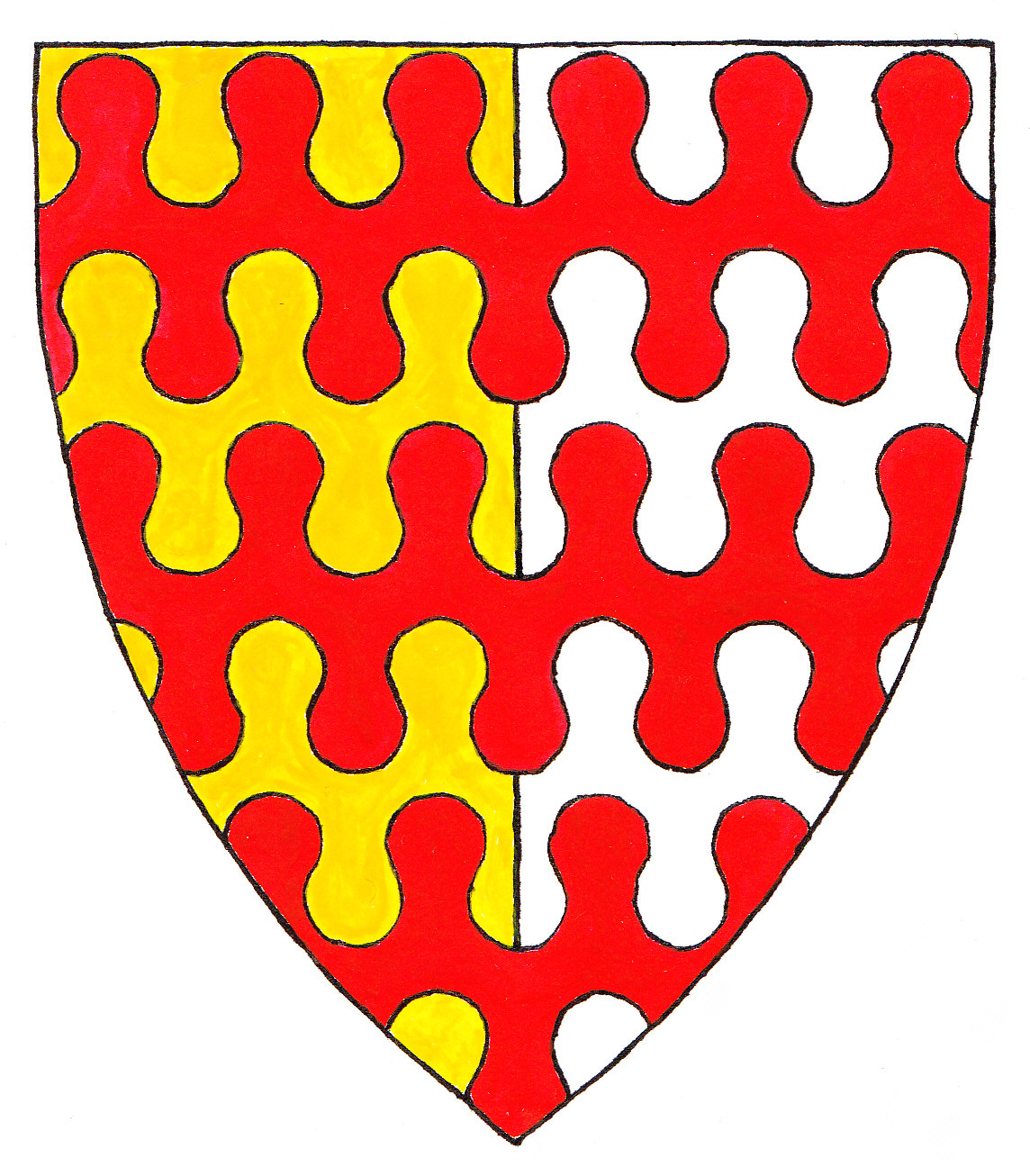
Arms of John Dauntsey: Per pale or and argent, 3 bars nebulée gules. These arms can be seen on various monuments within the parish church

The family which took its name from the manor of Dauntsey is said by Macnamara to have originally been called "Oldstock", which he deduced from its Latinised name Vetus Ceppus in early charters. Ceppus or Cippus signifies in mediaeval Latin "stocks", in which a felon's legs and feet were locked.

=== Stradling ===
The oldest memorial in the church is that of Joan Dauntesey who died c. 1455 and her third husband John Dewale who predeceased her. Joan was the daughter of Sir John Dauntesey who died in 1413 and it was through her that the Dauntsey Estate went to the Stradling family. Joan was born in about 1394, and when very young became the second wife of the elderly Sir Maurice Russell (d.1416) of Dyrham, Gloucestershire, who had only two daughters by his first wife. Joan produced for him a son and heir Thomas, who however died as a young man in 1431 leaving a pregnant wife named Joan, whose resulting daughter named Margery died at two days old. Thus ended the line of Russell of Dyrham. Joan Dauntsey married again, almost immediately after Russell's death, to Sir John Stradling (d.1435), the second son of the lord of St Donat's Castle in Glamorgan. The marriage was possibly arranged by Russell's son-in-law Sir Gilbert Denys (d.1422) who was from Glamorgan and was related to the Stradlings. Stradling thus obtained a life interest in Joan's dower, consisting of one third of the Russell manors. The marriage was conducted with such haste that the obtaining of the necessary royal licence for a widow of a tenant-in-chief to remarry was overlooked. The couple were fined heavily in 1417 for their transgression, as the following entry in the Patent Rolls dated 8 July 1418 reveals:

"Pardon, for 40 marks paid in the hanaper, to John Stradlyng, chivaler, and Joan late the wife of Maurice Russell, chivaler, tenant in chief, of their trespass in intermarrying without licence."

Thereupon commenced the Stradling family of Wiltshire. In 1428 a feudal aid was assessed on John Stradling for the manor of Dauntsey in the hundred of Malmesbury. He was then also lord of the manors of Smethcote and Castle Combe. Unexpectedly, during her marriage to Stradling, Joan inherited the entire Dauntsey patrimony, on the early death without progeny of her brother Sir Walter Dauntsey.

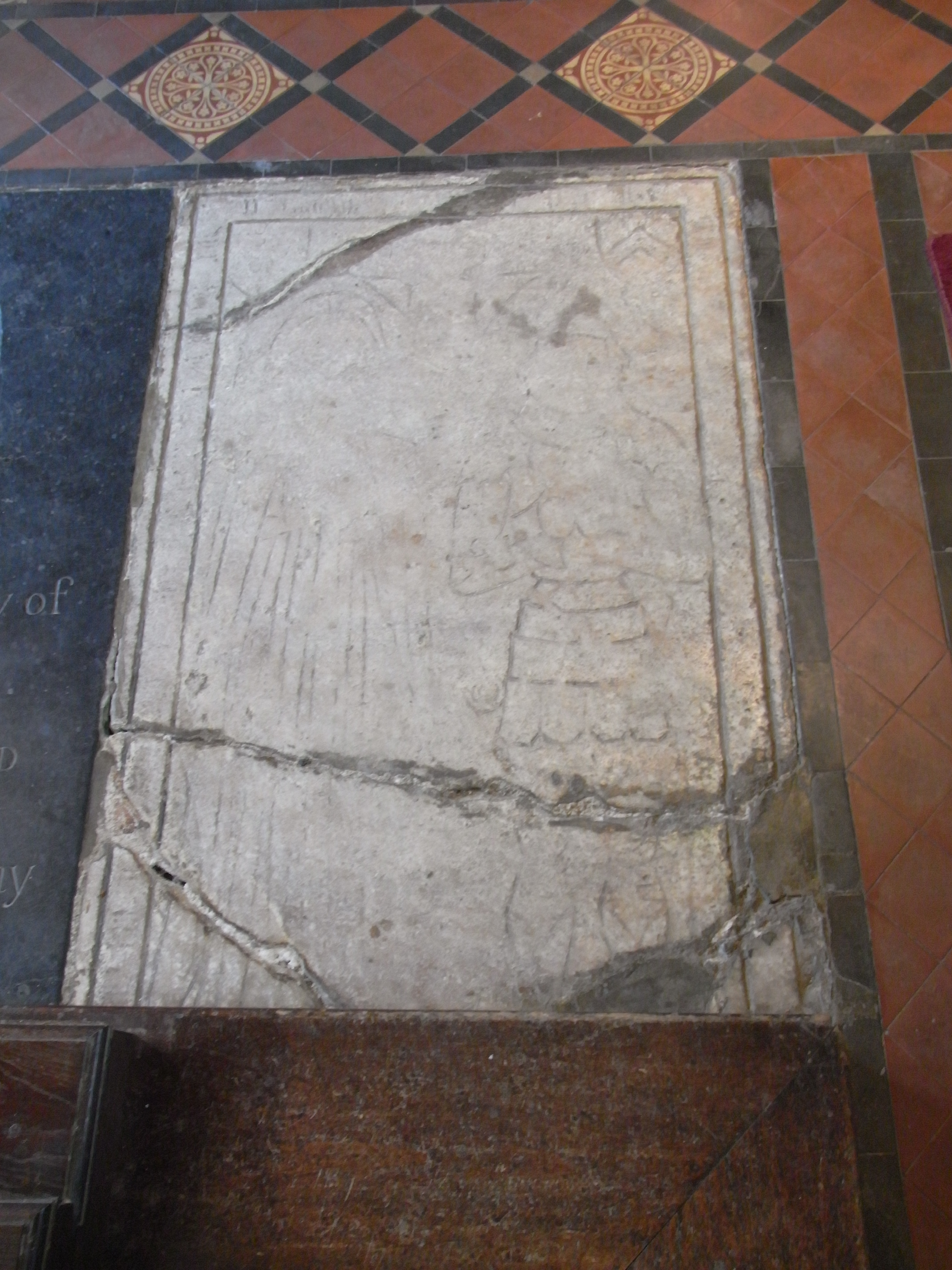
Sculpted alabaster tombstone of Joan Dauntsey (d.1457) and John Dewale; his shield of arms, of which only a chevron remains visible, is at top right

Joan outlived Stradling and married, thirdly, John Dewale, with whom she is buried, as is witnessed by an alabaster slab in front of the high altar in St James's Church, showing the couple life size, he being dressed in full armour. Around the margin of the slab runs a much obliterated inscription:

Hic jacet Johannes Dewale armiger et Domina Johanna uxor eius quondam uxor Domini Mauricii Russel militis qui quondam Johannes Dewale obiit mense...die ultimo MCCCC...III. Et prefata Johanna obiit in primo die anno Dom....Quorum (aiabus p'pcietur ?) Deus. Amen

In English:

"Here lies John Dewale, esquire, and Dame Joan his wife once wife of Maurice Russell, knight, which said John Dewale died in the month...on the last day (of) 14...3. And the aforesaid Joan died on the first day A.D....Of whom (may God spare their souls?). Amen"

Above her head are the armorials of Dauntsey, severely worn away, and above Dewale's head is his shield of arms on which only a chevron can now be seen. Dauntsey folklore relates that the parish priest named Cuthbert murdered Edward, the last male member of the Stradling family. The murder was caught on the evidence of a kitchen boy who had hidden himself in an oven and was an eyewitness. Cuthbert was said to have starved to death hanging in a cage from a tree in the gardens.

=== Danvers ===
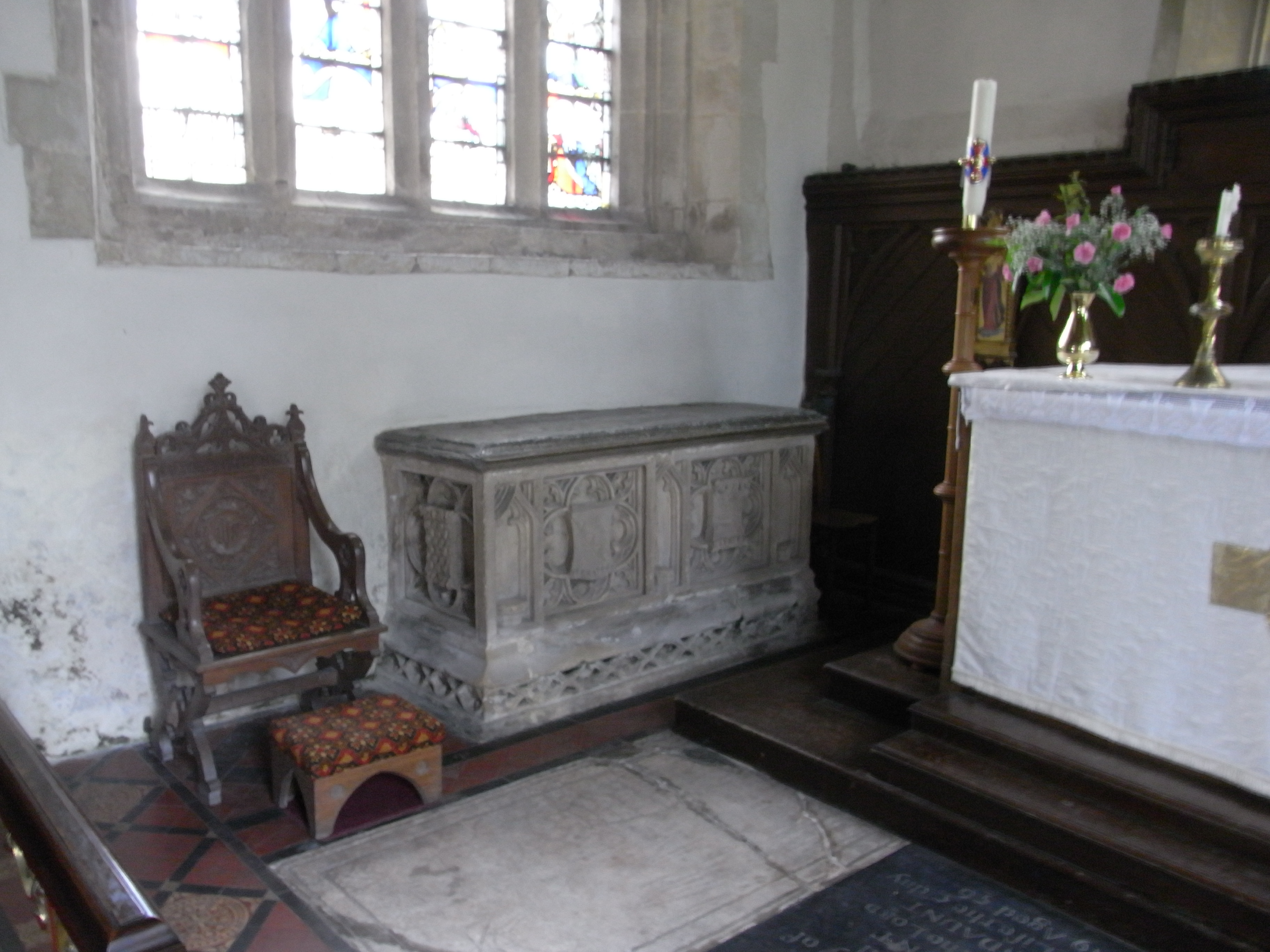
Tomb of Sir John Danvers (d.1514) and Anne Stradling (d.1539)

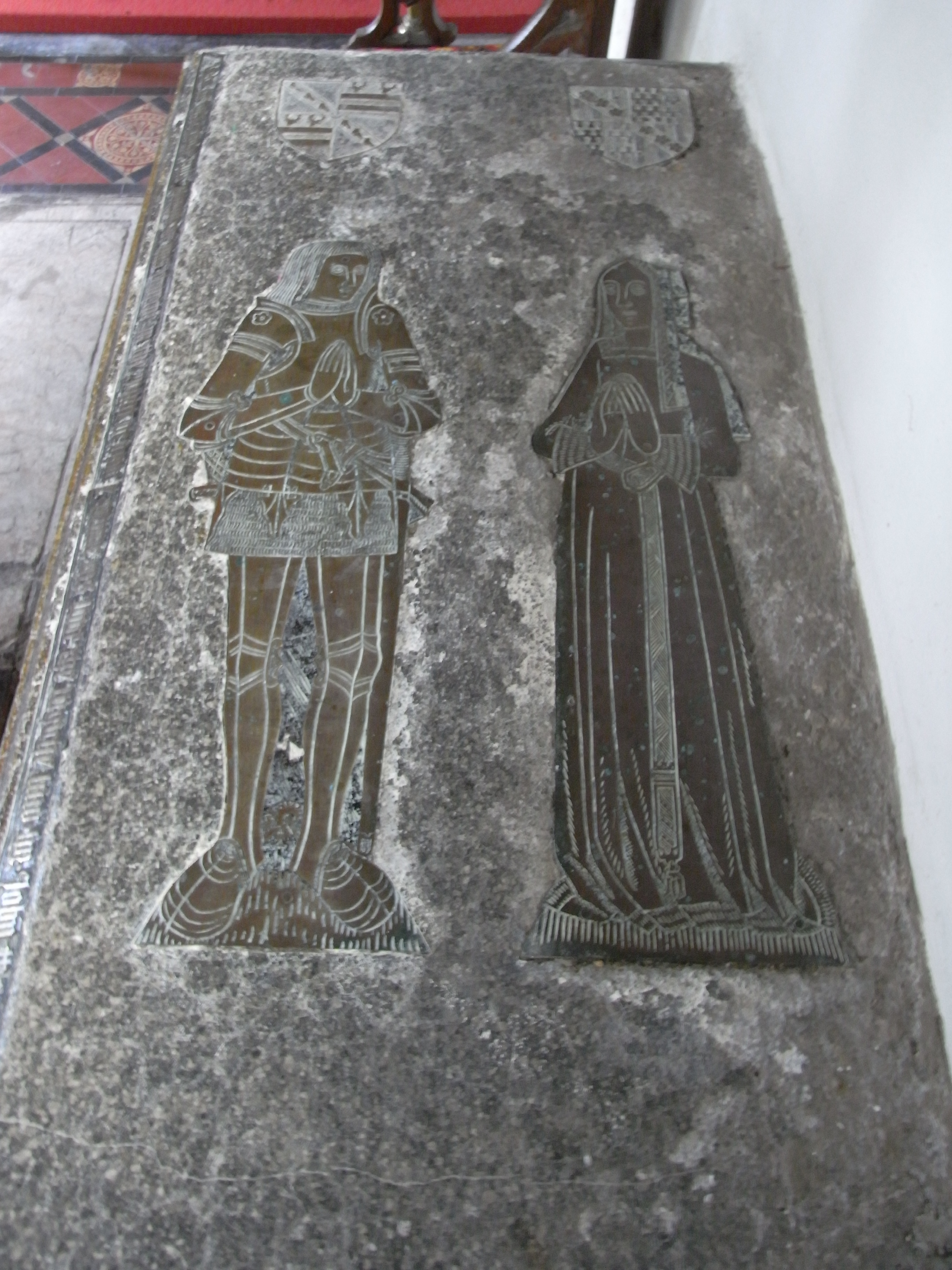
Brasses atop the Danvers-Stradling tomb

Edward Stradling's sister Anne married Sir John Danvers and so introduced the Danvers family to Dauntsey. To the north of the chancel is the tomb of Sir John and Lady Anne. Above the tomb are fragments of a stained glass window with Sir John and his wife kneeling with their sons and daughters. Anne outlived her husband by 25 years, and had a canopied tomb built for herself on the south wall of the chancel. To the north of the chancel stands the chapel that houses the marble tomb of Henry Danvers, created 1st Earl of Danby by Charles I; on the east end of the tomb is an epitaph written to his stepfather by George Herbert the poet, who stayed some time at Dauntsey Park. On the north wall of the chapel is the Bissett Memorial noting a charitable distribution of coal to the poor. On Henry's death in 1643 the estate passed to his younger brother Sir John, named after his grandfather. His political views differed from his brothers; he sat in judgement on Charles I and with the Restoration was condemned as a regicide; he had died in 1655, and his coffin was to be dug up and destroyed as a traitor, but it was never found.

=== Mordaunt ===
As a result, the estate and church were forfeited to the Crown. In 1690 they were granted to the Mordaunt family, whose name is linked with Charles Mordaunt, Earl of Peterborough. The arms of the Earl can be seen above the South door.

=== Meux ===
In the 1890s, Sir Henry and Lady Meux occupied the house and Lady Meux left her mark on the church by removing an old stained glass window and replacing it with another in memory of Sir Henry Meux.

== St James the Great Church ==
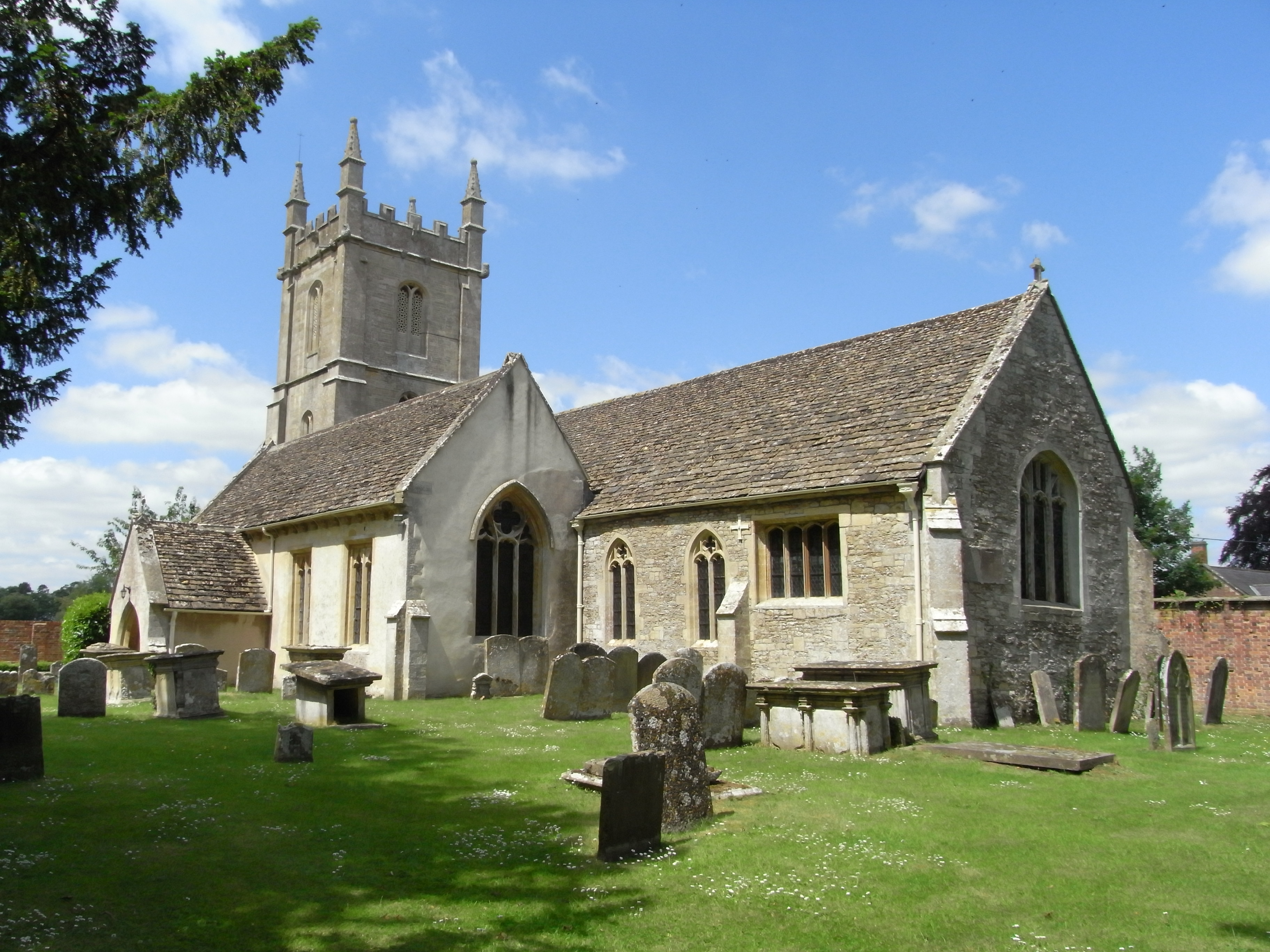
St James the Great

The parish church, on the edge of the village, can be dated back to 1177 when Malmesbury Abbey claimed it; in 1263 it was given to the Lord of Dauntsey Park House. In the 14th century the nave, north and south aisles were added. The bell tower (1620) and north-east chapel (1656) were built for the first Earl of Danby and family. By 1763 it was dedicated to St James the Great.

There are many historical features in the church, from dates etched into pews by bored youngsters to the medieval doom board, the prime historical feature – one of only five painted wooden tympanums in the country. It is above the rood screen, with Christ in the centre of the top. The two characters under Jesus are John and Mary the mother of Jesus; these have been painted over in the past by residents of the manor house who had themselves put into the painting. To the right are Adam and Eve being cast out of the Garden of Eden by St Michael wielding his sword. At the bottom left are the dead in their shrouds; some have discarded their shrouds and are on their way to St Peter's gate and the others are headed for the yaws of the Devil, depicted as a fire-breathing monster at the bottom right. The painting was designed to put the fear of God into all who looked upon it. This is the third paint scheme of the tympanum. Prior paint schemes did not display the Last Days; rather, they likely reflect the religious attitudes of the local lords.

The tower has five bells, of which three are from the 17th century. The First World War memorial window at the east end of the south aisle was designed and made by Kempe and Tower, whose trademark, a black tower above a golden garb or wheatsheaf, can be seen on the bottom left of the window.

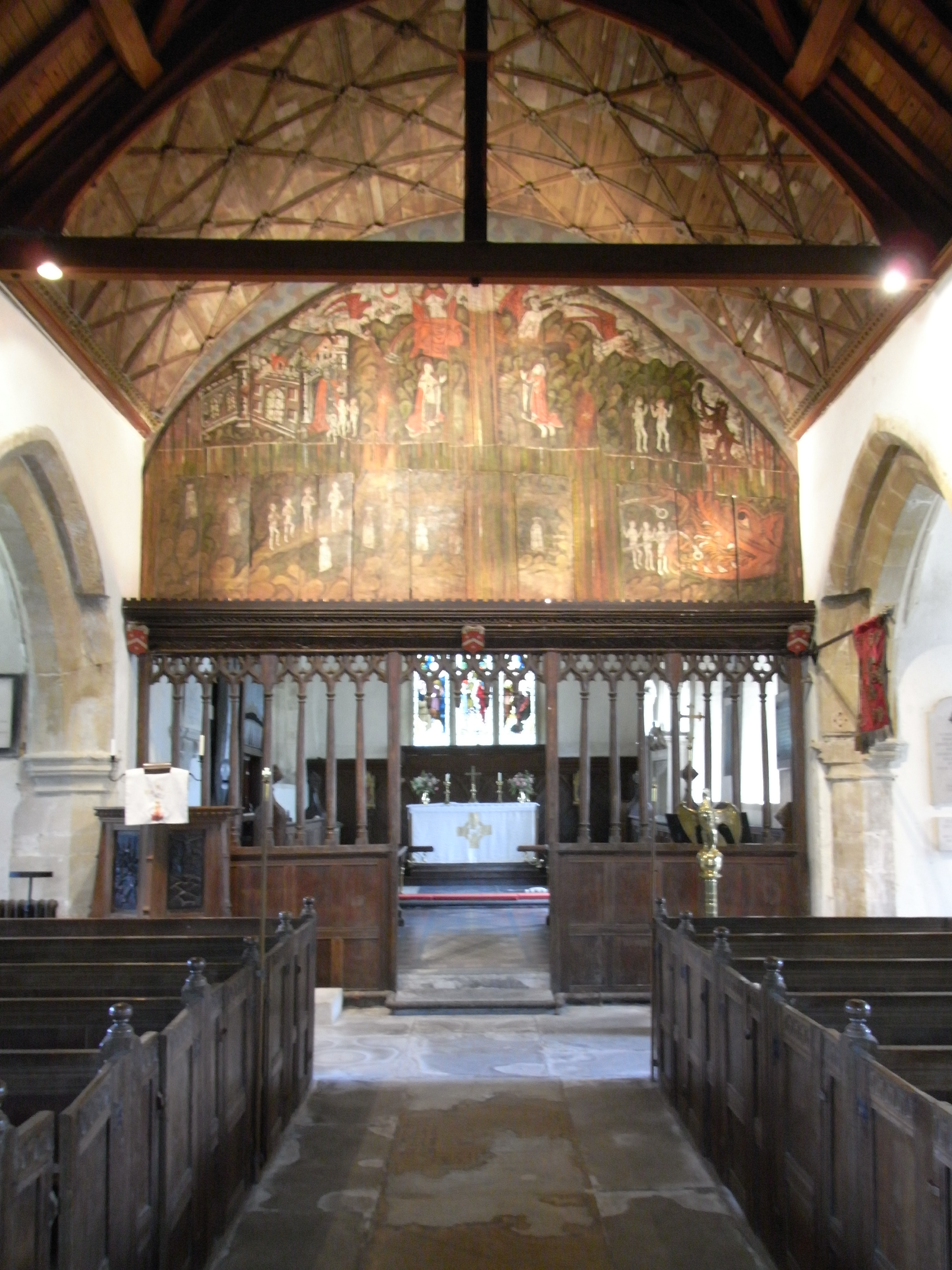
Church interior with medieval doom painting

The church is a Grade I listed building. The benefice was united with Brinkworth in 1961 and today forms part of the Woodbridge group of churches.

== Economy ==
Dauntsey's Old Rectory is the home of Dauntsey Preserves, a small family business using produce from local growers.

== Transport ==
The Wilts & Berks Canal was built across the south of the parish c. 1801. Traffic declined after the railway was built and was minimal by the end of the century; the canal was formally abandoned in 1914.

The Great Western Main Line from London to Bristol was built in 1841, following a similar route, to the north of the canal. Dauntsey railway station, opened in 1868 and closed in 1965, was to the north of Dauntsey Lock. It had three platforms: two for the main line and (until 1933) one for the branch line to Malmesbury.

The road through Dauntsey Lock, linking Chippenham with Lyneham and Royal Wootton Bassett, was formerly the A420 which was a main route from Bristol to Swindon and Oxford. After the opening of the M4 motorway (completed in 1971) this section was reclassified as the B4069.

== Amenities ==
The primary school amalgamated in 1992 with the school at Brinkworth, to form Brinkworth Earl Danby's CE VC Primary School.

The only pub in the parish is the Peterborough Arms, an early-19th-century building at Dauntsey Lock. The establishment was bought in 2014 by the Wilts & Berks Canal Trust, which has offices and a community meeting room on the same site.

== Sources ==
- "Stradling family of Glamorganshire". Dictionary of Welsh Biography. National Library of Wales.
- Histed, Lucy. A Guide to St James the Great, Dauntsey, c. 2007 (Booklet in church)
- Macnamara, Francis Nottige (1895). Memorials of the Danvers family (of Dauntsey and Culworth). London: Hardy & Page.
- Plumtree, James. 'The earlier paint schemes and possible contexts of the Dauntsey Doom'. Wiltshire Archaeological and Natural History Magazine 107 (2014): 156–162.
