= Braydon Side =

Hamlet in Wiltshire, England

Coordinates: 51.571°N 1.979°W

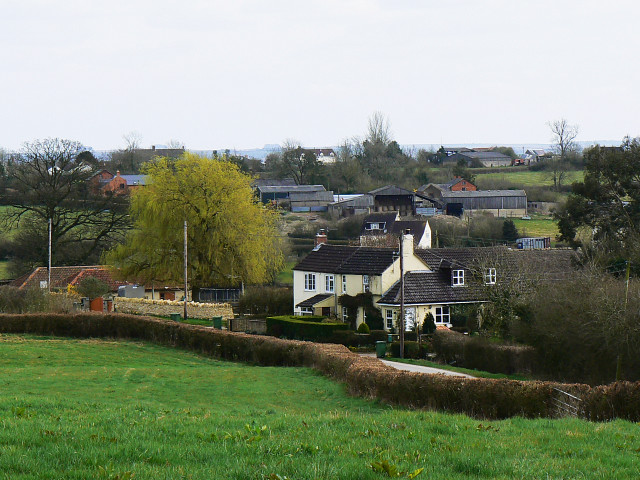

- Location within Wiltshire
- OS grid reference: SU016858
- Civil parish: Brinkworth
- Unitary authority: Wiltshire
- Ceremonial county: Wiltshire
- Region: South West
- Country: England
- Sovereign state: United Kingdom
- Post town: Chippenham
- Postcode district: SN15
- Dialling code: 01666
- Police: Wiltshire
- Fire: Dorset and Wiltshire
- Ambulance: South Western
- UK Parliament: South Cotswolds

Braydon Side is a farming hamlet in north Wiltshire, England, in the parish of Brinkworth. It lies about 0.9 miles (1.4 km) north of Brinkworth village.
