= Little Somerford =

Village in Wiltshire, England

Coordinates: 51.558°N 2.048°W

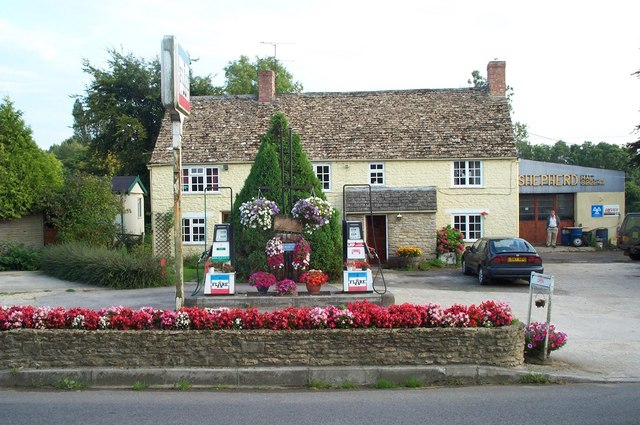
- Bob Shepherd's Garage, Little Somerford

- Location within Wiltshire
- Population: 357 (in 2011)
- OS grid reference: ST968843
- Civil parish: Little Somerford
- Unitary authority: Wiltshire
- Ceremonial county: Wiltshire
- Region: South West
- Country: England
- Sovereign state: United Kingdom
- Post town: Chippenham
- Postcode district: SN15
- Dialling code: 01249; 01666
- Police: Wiltshire
- Fire: Dorset and Wiltshire
- Ambulance: South Western
- UK Parliament: South Cotswolds
- Website: Parish Council

Little Somerford is a village and civil parish in Wiltshire, England, 3 miles (4.8 km) southeast of Malmesbury and 7.5 miles (12.1 km) northeast of Chippenham.

The northern boundary of the parish follows approximately the B4042 Malmesbury–Swindon road. The Bristol Avon forms part of the boundary to the west and south, and its tributary the Brinkworth Brook forms part of the southeastern boundary.

== History ==
Eight estates were recorded in the 1086 Domesday Book at Sumreford, with altogether 80 households. The 'Little' prefix began to be used in the 16th century to distinguish the parish from neighbouring Great Somerford.

A school for 100 pupils was built in 1868 to replace an earlier schoolroom, and was extended in 1894. Children of all ages attended until 1954, when those aged 11 and over transferred to the secondary schools at Malmesbury. The school closed in 1982 when a new school was opened in Great Somerford to serve both villages.

The South Wales Main Line railway from London to Bristol and South Wales passes close to the village. Little Somerford had a station from the opening of the line in 1903, and in 1933 the junction with the Malmesbury Branch Line was moved here (at the opening of the branch in 1877 it was connected to the Great Western Main Line at Dauntsey, 3 miles (4.8 km) to the south). Passenger service on the branch ceased in 1951 and the branch was closed in 1962. Little Somerford station was closed in 1963.

== Church ==
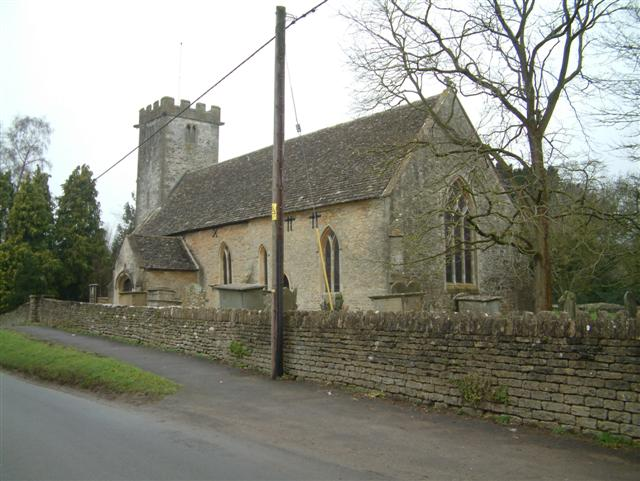
Church of St John the Baptist

The first record of a church at Little Somerford is in 1251. The church was rebuilt c. 1300 although the nave may survive from the earlier building. The tower and porch were added in the 15th century; restoration was carried out in 1860.

The timber chancel screen was begun in the 14th century. A boarded tympanum from the 15th century is described by Historic England as "exceptional", although the lower part is missing: it is painted with two angels and the Commandments. The tower arch carries a large royal coat of arms dated 1602, moved here in 1983 from the tympanum to reveal the painting.

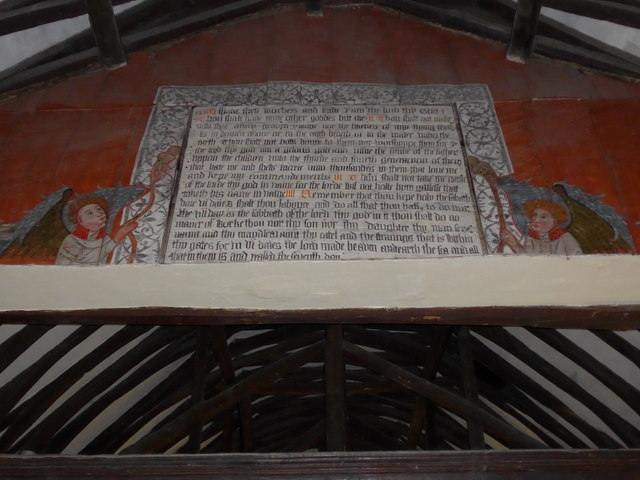
The 15th-century tympanum

The pulpit is dated 1626, and the pews in the nave are box pews from the same century, now cut down to make benches. The three bells in the tower were recast in the 18th century. The tower screen of 1928 is by Robert Lorimer. The church was designated as Grade I listed in 1959.

From 1952 and again from 1967, the benefice was held in plurality with Great Somerford. Later in 1967 the benefice was united with Great Somerford and Seagry, and the benefice of Corston with Rodbourne was added in 1986. Today St John's is one of six churches in the Woodbridge Group.

== Local government ==
The civil parish elects a parish council. It is in the area of Wiltshire Council unitary authority, which is responsible for all significant local government functions.
