= Dauntsey Vale =

Valley in Wiltshire, England

Coordinates: 51.52°N 2.02°W

The Dauntsey Vale is a geographical feature in the north of the English county of Wiltshire.

It is characterised by a wide, flat, clay floodplain of the upper reaches of the Bristol Avon river, which divides the Cotswolds to the west from the chalk downland of east and south Wiltshire. It is triangular in shape with its north edge running from the town of Royal Wootton Bassett in the east to Malmesbury in the west. This prominent north ridge is the setting for the village of Brinkworth, which at five miles long, claims to be the longest village in England.

The western edge of the Vale is the edge of the Cotswolds, running from Malmesbury to Chippenham in the south. This edge is less pronounced than the classic escarpment which forms the western edge of the Cotswolds. It is characterised by a gradual drop in level, but more in the different building materials of the villages. For instance, Stanton St Quintin above the Vale has a distinct Cotswolds feel with the typical honey-coloured building stone and roof slates, while villages just a few miles away to the east like Christian Malford and Sutton Benger have typically thatched homes.

The eastern edge of the Vale is more pronounced, with a steep and high hill forming a ridge running from Wootton Bassett in the north to close to Calne in the south. This ridge top provided the site for RAF Lyneham, the home until 2011 of the RAF's Hercules transport planes.

It takes its name from the village of Dauntsey in the centre of the Vale.

== Agriculture and land use ==
The Dauntsey Vale, with its wet and lush green fields, is traditionally dairy pasture land. It was once a major milk and cheese producing area. Today, much dairy survives but is increasingly being replaced by arable farming, some sheep grazing and especially equestrian use.

== Transport ==
With its flat and steady descent, the Dauntsey Vale has since the Industrial Revolution been used as a major route to cross southern England, providing a manageable descent from the chalk highlands of eastern Wiltshire to Bath and Bristol below.

The first to do so was the Wilts and Berks Canal, whose course hugged the foot of the eastern ridge.

Brunel then used the Vale for the first Great Western Railway line from London to Bath and Bristol, which was followed by the line to South Wales in 1901, which diverges from the earlier line at Royal Wootton Bassett.

Finally, the M4 motorway descends across the Vale from north east to south west, and cuts through the lesser eastern Cotswolds scarp at Stanton St Quintin.

== Notable people ==
Mathilda Heath, a 15th-century philanthropist with connections to Bristol shipping, lived at East Tytherton, near Chippenham. She funded construction of an elaborate and lengthy causeway from her village to Chippenham to provide a safe and dry route, and gave money to trustees for its future upkeep. Much of Maud Heath's Causeway survives, particularly where it crosses the Avon. A statue of her was erected on the eastern scarp overlooking the vale above East Tytherton in Victorian times.

Captain Mark Phillips, first husband of Princess Anne, The Princess Royal, and father to Peter Phillips and Zara Phillips, had his ancestral home at Great Somerford.
