= Wiltshire North =

Wiltshire North may refer to:

- North Wiltshire, a former local government district in the county of Wiltshire, South-West England
- North Wiltshire (UK Parliament constituency), a former constituency in the same area
