= Old Church of St Andrew, Upleatham =

Anglican church in Redcar and Cleveland, England

Old Church of St Andrew
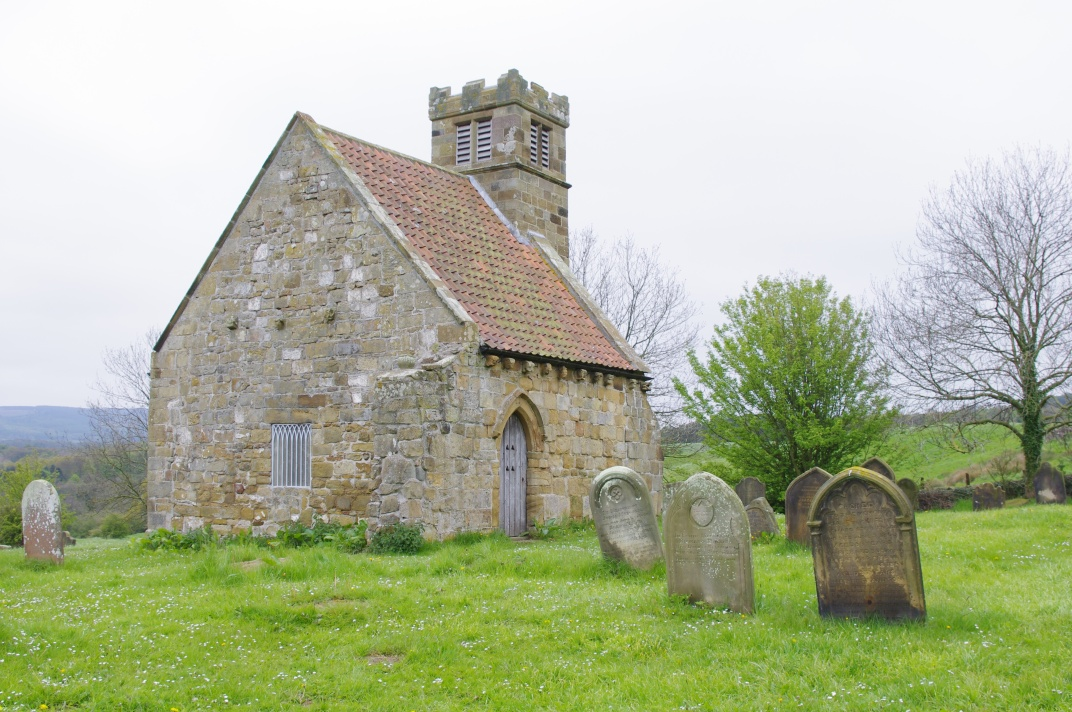
- Old Church of St Andrew
- Old Church of St Andrew
- 54.565°N 1.016°W
- OS grid reference: NZ 63712 19367
- Location: Upleatham, Redcar and Cleveland
- Country: England
- Denomination: Anglican

Listed Building – Grade II*
- Designated: 25 April 1954
- Reference no.: 1139759

The Old Church of St Andrew is a redundant grade II* listed Anglican church in the village of Upleatham, Redcar and Cleveland, England. Parts of the church date back to the 12th century, and it was replaced as a working church by the newer Church of St Andrew, which is located closer to the village, the old church being outside of Upleatham. Although no longer used for services, the church is noted as being one of the smallest in England.

== History ==
The Old Church of St Andrew is noted as being one of the smallest churches in England, due to its size of just 20 feet (6 m) by 13 feet (4 m) (only one church in England is smaller - Bremilham Church in Wiltshire). The church was historically bigger than the size it is today, with historians believing that in 1684, when the tower was added, the south side of the church was removed. The current size of the church only allows 30 worshippers inside.

The church is thought to have existed since at least the 12th century, and the first mention of the church at Upleatham is when it was given to the canon and priors of Gisborough Priory, who had parochial rights over the area. The Brus family donated most of their land and the churches to Gisborough Priory c. 1119, around the time of the priory's founding.

Excavations on the site in 1911 unearthed a ninth century Anglo-Danish cross, which suggests the village existed pre-dates the Domesday survey. In 1974, further archaeological digs revealed some fragments of a cross that dates back to the 10th century. The church is 0.5-mile (0.8 km) outside of the village to the east along the B1268 road. It is thought that the village was moved to its present location in the 16th–17th century, but the reasons for the re-location, and leaving the church alone, are unknown.

All that remains of the church is the west end of the nave, which is Norman in architecture, an embattled tower on the west side, and fragments of the ruined church on the eastern side. Archaeological investigations of the church's footprint and the ruins, have led to an estimation that the original nave was 36 feet (11 m) long by 18 feet 9 inches (5.72 m) wide. The east wall is a later addition to the fabric of the church, believed to have been erected when the rest of the church was removed in 1822. In the eastern part of the churchyard is a low wall, part of the original church and the location of the Lowther Vault.

The church is within the boundary of the Upleatham conservation area, and was grade II* listed in 1954. It is maintained by the National Churches Trust. From the 1830s, services were moved to the newer Ignatius Bonomi designed St Andrew's Church in the same village, however, this also ceased being an active church in 1989, and has been converted into a private home. After being supplanted by the newer church, the Old Church of St Andrew became a mortuary chapel.
