= Upleatham =

Village in North Yorkshire, England

Coordinates: 54°34′N 1°01′W

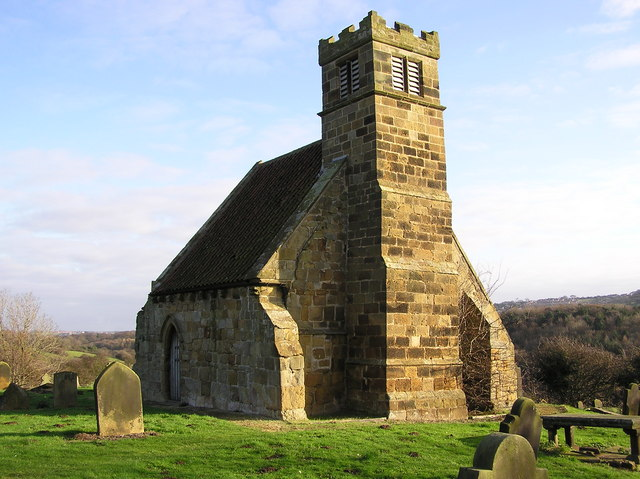
- The very small church at Upleatham

- Location within North Yorkshire
- Civil parish: Guisborough
- Unitary authority: Redcar and Cleveland
- Ceremonial county: North Yorkshire
- Region: North East
- Country: England
- Sovereign state: United Kingdom
- Police: Cleveland
- Fire: Cleveland
- Ambulance: North East

Upleatham is a village in the civil parish of Guisborough, in the unitary authority area of Redcar and Cleveland and the ceremonial county of North Yorkshire, England. The village was mentioned in the Domesday Book and the name derives from Old English and Old Norse as Upper Slope, in that it was further up the hill than Kirkleatham.

On 1 April 1974 the parish was abolished and merged with Guisborough.

An ironstone seam that was 13 feet (4 m) thick was worked beneath the village which meant that some dwellings were lost to subsidence. The ironstone mine was constructed in 1861 and operated until 1924 with reserves of ironstone being estimated at a little over 36,000,000 tonnes (40,000,000 tons). The landowner of the time, the Earl of Zetland, allowed the mining company to extract the ironstone from underneath the village provided that the area around the church was left undisturbed. This is why the conservation area in the village is just a small selection of buildings clustered around the church.

It has a small grade II listed church, believed by some to be the smallest in England, although Bremilham Church in Wiltshire is actually slightly smaller. The village is located near New Marske, between Saltburn and Guisborough; there are a few rows of houses which are adjacent to Errington Woods.

== Demographics ==
The arrival of the ironstone mine increased the population of the village from 204 in 1841 to 1,007 in 1861. Before it was abolished, the parish had declined to a population of 121 in 1951.
