= Malmesbury railway station =

Former railway station in England

Malmesbury
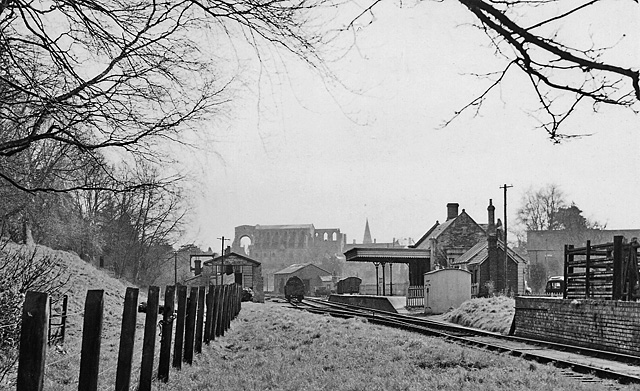
- The station in 1958

General information
- Location: Malmesbury, Wiltshire; England
- Coordinates: 51.5886°N 2.1001°W
- Grid reference: ST932877
- Platforms: 1

Other information
- Status: Disused

History
- Original company: Malmesbury Railway
- Pre-grouping: Great Western Railway
- Post-grouping: Great Western Railway; Western Region of British Railways

Key dates
- 18 December 1877: Opened
- 12 February 1951: Closed
- 2 April 1951: Reopened
- 10 September 1951: Closed to passengers
- 12 November 1962: Closed to goods
Location

Malmesbury railway station served the town of Malmesbury in Wiltshire, England, between 1877 and 1962. The station was on the short Malmesbury branch from the Great Western Railway's main line from London Paddington to Bristol Temple Meads.

== Background ==
In 1864 the Wiltshire and Gloucestershire Railway Company was authorised to construct a line from Stroud to Christian Malford Halt through Tetbury and Malmesbury. Work started on 1 July 1865, but due to disagreements between the two major shareholders, the Midland Railway and the Great Western, work was stalled, and in 1871 the company was wound up.

== Operations ==
In 1872, the government approved a cut-down plan to build a line from Dauntsey to Malmesbury, opening on 18 December 1877. Unusually, the station was accessed by a short tunnel, and beyond the town, perhaps with the original scheme development to Stroud in mind. After the Severn Tunnel was constructed to directly connect to South Wales, its line crossed the Malmesbury branch. In 1933, connection was made with this line, and the additional line truncated.

On 10 September 1951 the line closed to passenger traffic, and to goods on 11 November 1962, after which the tracks were lifted. The station site today is a small industrial estate and a car park.

Preceding station	Disused railways	Following station
Terminus	Great Western Railway; Malmesbury branch	Great Somerford Halt
