= Harries Ground, Rodbourne =

Protected area in Wiltshire, England

Coordinates: 51.53956°N 2.10232°W

Harries Ground, Rodbourne (grid reference ST930823) is a 6.87 hectare biological Site of Special Scientific Interest in Wiltshire, England, notified in 2003. It lies to the south of Rodbourne in north Wiltshire, about 3 miles (5 km) south of Malmesbury.

This site exists due to the passion of Sir John Michael Hungerford Pollen, 7th Baronet of Redenham.

== Sources ==
- Natural England citation sheet for the site (accessed 1 April 2022)
