= Sutton Benger =

Village in Wiltshire, England

Coordinates: 51.507°N 2.078°W

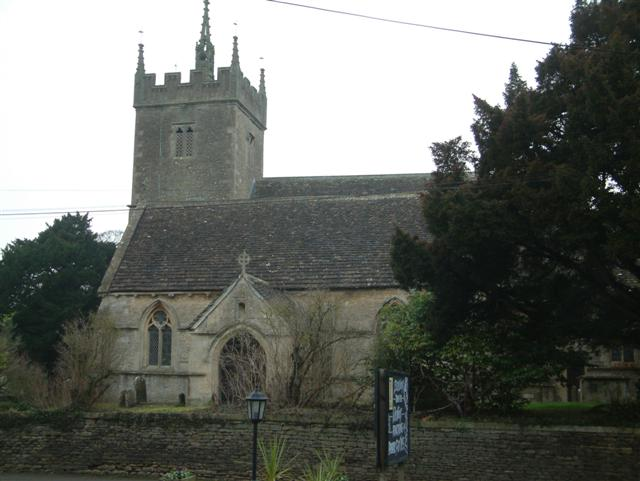
- All Saints Church, Sutton Benger

- Location within Wiltshire
- Population: 1,045 (in 2011)
- OS grid reference: ST947787
- Civil parish: Sutton Benger
- Unitary authority: Wiltshire
- Ceremonial county: Wiltshire
- Region: South West
- Country: England
- Sovereign state: United Kingdom
- Post town: CHIPPENHAM
- Postcode district: SN15
- Dialling code: 01249
- Police: Wiltshire
- Fire: Dorset and Wiltshire
- Ambulance: South Western
- UK Parliament: South Cotswolds
- Website: Parish Council

Sutton Benger is a village and civil parish in the county of Wiltshire, England, 5 miles (8.0 km) northeast of the town of Chippenham. The parish includes the hamlet of Draycot Cerne.

== Location ==
Sutton Benger lies in the Dauntsey Vale, the wide floodplain of the Bristol Avon. The river forms much of the eastern boundary of the parish.

== History ==
In 1086, a settlement at Draicote with 22 households was recorded in the Domesday Book survey. At that time the manor belonged to Malmesbury Abbey.

The 13th century saw the beginnings of two stone churches and the origins of Manor Farmhouse. Like many very old buildings, these have since been much altered and rebuilt.

Circa the 1540s, soon after the Dissolution, the manor was acquired by Robert Long (d.1581), who also owned Draycot. The estate remained in the Long family, later the Tylney-Long baronets. Over the centuries Sutton Benger village developed along the Swindon-Chippenham road.

In 1812, the estate passed by marriage to the 4th Earl of Mornington. The Earl's descendants held the land until 1920, when it was sold as separate farms.

In the 1950s Survey of English Dialects, the recording from the village was one of the furthest away from Standard English pronunciation that was recorded.

The modern road through the village was originally the A420, which ran from Bristol to Swindon and Oxford. This section was later reclassified as the B4069, some time after the building of the M4 motorway in the early 1970s, passing to the north of the village.

== Religious sites ==
The Anglican Church of All Saints is Grade II* listed. The stone rubble building has 12th-century origins and a 15th-century tower; it was heavily restored in 1851 by J.H. Hakewill. The circular stone font, decorated with a scalloped band, may be from an early date. Of the five bells, one is from c. 1400 and the dates of three others range from 1631 to 1706.

The benefice was united with those of Christian Malford and Tytherton Kellaways in 1966. Today the parish is part of the Draycot benefice, which also covers Seagry and Kington Langley.

St James's Church, Draycot Cerne was built around 1300 and declared redundant in 1994. Also Grade II* listed, it is in the care of the Churches Conservation Trust.

== Local government ==
The civil parish elects a parish council, which produces a website and a parish magazine. The parish is in the area of Wiltshire Council unitary authority, which is a county council responsible for all significant local government functions, though locally a Sutton Benger Neighbourhood Development Plan has been under consultation and development since 2015. This plan was completed in 2019 and aims to have an ongoing influence on decisions in the local planning system, and also to highlight the various new powers now available to local communities.

In 1934, Draycot Cerne and Seagry, formerly separate parishes, were added to Sutton Benger. In 1971 all land north of the newly built M4 motorway was transferred to a recreated Seagry parish.

== Amenities ==
The village has a Church of England primary school and a doctors' surgery. The village hall has a recreation ground and a multi-use games area. Several community groups make use of the hall including a pre-school, Benger Bears, a playgroup, W.I. and an Over 60's group.

For eating and drinking there is a pub named the Wellesley Arms; a restaurant, La Flambé;

== Economy ==
In 2008, Faccenda Group closed their chicken processing plant in the village, with the loss of 450 jobs, moving production elsewhere.

== Notable people ==
- Several generations of the Quaker Fry family lived in the village, among them John Fry (d. 1775) whose son Joseph founded the Bristol chocolate and cocoa business which became J. S. Fry & Sons
- Rt. Rev. Christopher Lipscomb, vicar of Sutton Benger from 1818, became first Anglican Bishop of Jamaica.
- Gabrielle Aplin (born 1992), singer-songwriter, was brought up in the village.
