= Christian Malford Halt railway station =

Former railway station in England

Coordinates: 51.50388°N 2.04922°W

Christian Malford Halt

General information
- Location: Christian Malford, County of Wiltshire; England
- Platforms: 2

Other information
- Status: Disused

History
- Original company: Great Western Railway
- Post-grouping: Great Western Railway

Key dates
- 18 Oct 1926: Opened
- 4 Jan 1965: Closed
Location

Christian Malford Halt served the village of Christian Malford, Wiltshire from 1926 to 1965. It was situated on the Great Western Main Line which runs from London to Bristol.

The station is located half a mile south of Christian Malford where the railway passes over Station Road. The halt consisted of two timber platforms, each with a wooden shelter. There is no trace of the halt today, although the access path on the up side is still there.

Preceding station	Disused railways	Following station
Chippenham	British Rail; Great Western Main Line; Great Western Main Line	Dauntsey
