= Brokenborough =

Village in Wiltshire, England

Coordinates: 51.602°N 2.120°W

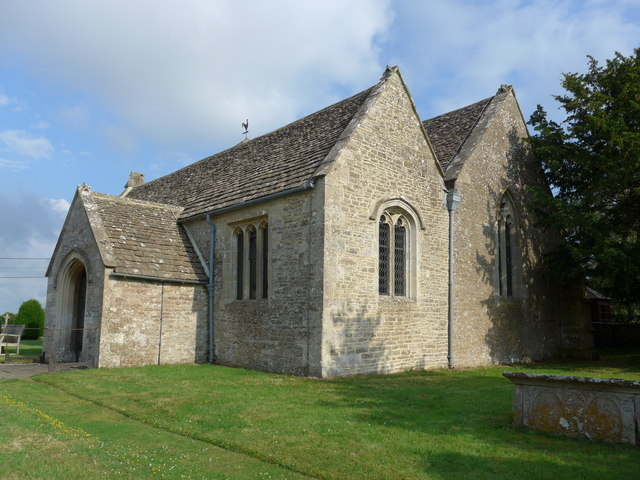
- St John the Baptist parish church

- Location within Wiltshire
- Population: 186 (in 2021)
- OS grid reference: ST918892
- Civil parish: Brokenborough
- Unitary authority: Wiltshire
- Ceremonial county: Wiltshire
- Region: South West
- Country: England
- Sovereign state: United Kingdom
- Post town: Malmesbury
- Postcode district: SN16
- Dialling code: 01666
- Police: Wiltshire
- Fire: Dorset and Wiltshire
- Ambulance: South Western
- UK Parliament: South Cotswolds
- Website: Parish Council

Brokenborough is a village and civil parish about 1 1/2 miles (2.4 km) northwest of Malmesbury, Wiltshire in England. The course of the Fosse Way Roman road forms the northwest boundary of the parish, and also the county boundary with neighbouring Gloucestershire. The Tetbury Avon, also called the Ingleburn, flows through the parish west of the village. The 2021 Census recorded the parish's population as 186. The village forms part of the ecclesiastical parish of Malmesbury and Brokenborough, in the Diocese of Bristol.

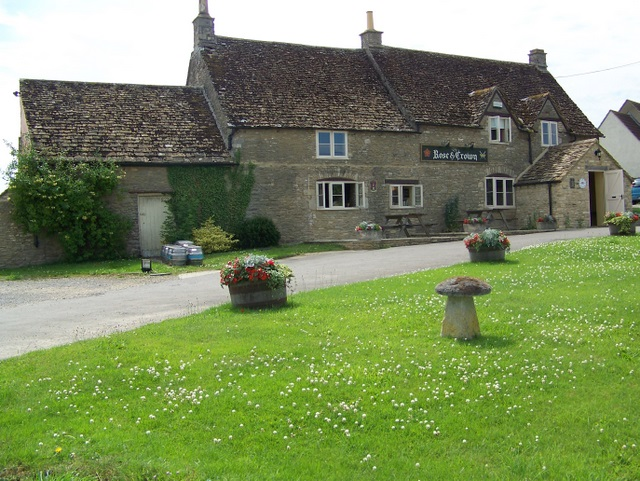
The pub under its earlier name, the Rose and Crown, in 2009

== History ==
The name of Brokenborough may derive from a geographic descriptor meaning "broken hill" (Old English brocen = broken, uneven + Anglian berg = hill, barrow). Alternatively it could mean "ruined fort", from Old English brocen = broken + burg = fort.

The early history of Brokenborough is based on unreliable sources. The antiquarian John Leland (1503–1552) relates that Máel Dub (d. 675) came as a hermit to the area and started his monastic school in the shelter of a castle built by Dunwallo Mulmutius at Bladon or Bladow, called in Old English Ingelborne Castle. King Æthelstan (r. 924 – 939) is said to have resided in a royal palace in Brokenborough, close to this site.

The Domesday Book records that in 1086 Malmesbury Abbey held a large estate of 50 hides at Brokenborough. In the 11th and 12th centuries the abbey claimed it had held it since AD 956.

The Church of England parish church of St John the Baptist is 13th-century and has a four-bay north aisle. The building was restored in 1883 and is Grade II* listed.

== Economy ==
The Great Barn at Brokenborough Farm, just south of the village, has 10 bays, nine cruck trusses, two porches and is probably 14th-century. It too is a Grade II* listed building. There was a farm with an even larger barn on a moated site somewhat further south, but it was demolished in the 17th century.

Brokenborough had a pub, the Horse Guards, but this has been closed down, with no date set for re-opening.

== Sources ==
- Baggs, A. P.; Freeman, Jane; Stevenson, Janet H. (1991). "Parishes: Brokenborough". In Crowley, D. A. (ed.). A History of the County of Wiltshire, Volume 14. Victoria County History. University of London. pp. 25–35 – via British History Online.
- Pevsner, Nikolaus; Cherry, Bridget (revision) (1975) [1963]. Wiltshire. The Buildings of England (2nd ed.). Harmondsworth: Penguin Books. p. 148. ISBN 0-14-0710-26-4.
