= Brinkworth, Wiltshire =

Village in Wiltshire, England

Coordinates: 51.559°N 1.980°W

Brinkworth
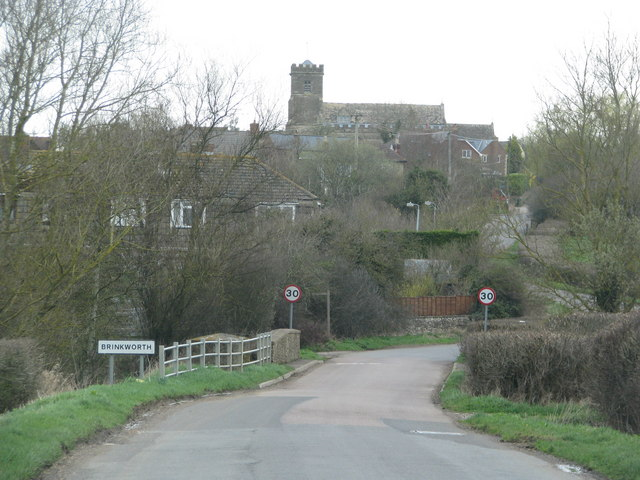
- School Hill, Brinkworth

- Location within Wiltshire
- Population: 1,331 (in 2021)
- OS grid reference: SU015845
- Unitary authority: Wiltshire Council
- Ceremonial county: Wiltshire
- Region: South West
- Country: England
- Sovereign state: United Kingdom
- Post town: CHIPPENHAM
- Postcode district: SN15
- Dialling code: 01666
- Police: Wiltshire
- Fire: Dorset and Wiltshire
- Ambulance: South Western
- UK Parliament: South Cotswolds
- Website: Parish Council

Brinkworth is a village and civil parish in northern Wiltshire, England. The village lies between Royal Wootton Bassett and Malmesbury, about 1 mile (1.6 km) north of the M4 motorway and 9 miles (14 km) west of Swindon.

The west end of Brinkworth village is Causeway End. The civil parish of Brinkworth includes the hamlets of Braydon Side, Callow Hill, The Common, and the tithing of Grittenham, a rural community to the south of the village of Brinkworth.

Much of Brinkworth village is a linear settlement along the east-west B4042, extending for some 4.2 miles (6.8 km). The village is described as the longest in England although others such as Meopham, Kent make the same claim.

== History ==
The name Brinkworth probably derives from the Old English Bryncaworð meaning 'Brynca's enclosure'.

Brinkworth Manor was given to Malmesbury Abbey by the nobleman Leofsige, sometime before the Domesday Book survey of 1086. The abbey held the land until the Dissolution of the Monasteries, at which time it was granted to William Stumpe. It then passed into the family of the Earl of Berkshire and Suffolk, until it was sold privately between 1858 and 1960. It is likely that the other estate of Brinkworth mentioned in Domesday, that held by Tochi, survived through the ensuing centuries as separate, smaller estates within the northern section of the parish (probably including Clitchbury Farm, Waldron's Farm and Whitehouse Farm). Grittenham is mentioned separately in the survey and was held at the time by Malmesbury Abbey. Following the dissolution it was granted to John Aycliffe, from whom it descended to the Lords Holland, who sold it privately at the end of the nineteenth century.

== Geography ==
The village stands on a ridge overlooking the Dauntsey Vale to the south. Two tributaries of the Bristol Avon flow east–west across the parish: the Woodbridge Brook passes to the north of the village, while the Brinkworth Brook passes to the south and then forms the southwestern boundary of the parish. Towards the eastern boundary of the parish the Brinkworth Brook is joined by a small brook which drains the Royal Wootton Bassett area.

== Religious sites ==
=== Parish church ===
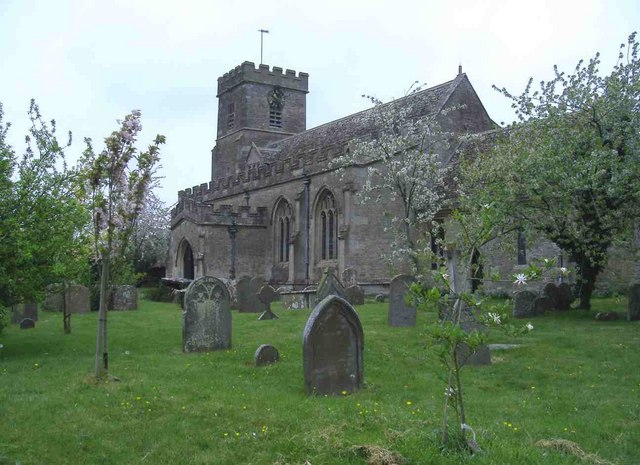
St Michael and All Angels

The parish church of St Michael and All Angels is a Grade I listed building. A church was recorded in 1151 and was linked with Malmesbury Abbey until 1539. The present church dates from the 14th and 15th centuries, and was restored by C. E. Ponting in 1902–3. St Michael's is one of six churches in the Woodbridge Group.

Notable rectors include Tobias Crisp, incumbent from 1627 to 1642.

=== Other churches ===
A Primitive Methodist chapel was built in 1828 in the Barnes Green area of Brinkworth, next to the main road through the village; Richard Jukes was the first minister. This was replaced by a larger building in 1860. The Wiltshire and Swindon History Centre has records up to 1995; by 2009 the building was a private house.

Vine House at Grittenham was used as a Moravian meeting house in the later 18th century and early 19th. Also at Grittenham, a small Primitive Methodist chapel was built in 1894; it was closed c. 1975.

== Canal and railways ==
The Wilts and Berks Canal, opened in this area in 1801, completed in 1810 and abandoned in 1914, passed through the far south of the parish on its route to Swindon. Tockenham Reservoir, on both sides of the boundary with Lyneham parish, supplied the canal with water. A flight of seven locks lifted the canal over rising ground; restoration of four of these was started in 2005.

The Great Western Main Line, Brunel's route from London to Bath and Bristol, was built just to the north of the canal and opened in 1841. In 1903 the more direct route to South Wales was completed with the opening of the Badminton line, diverging from the older line at Wootton Bassett and passing close to the south of Brinkworth village. Both lines are still in use.

=== Brinkworth railway station ===
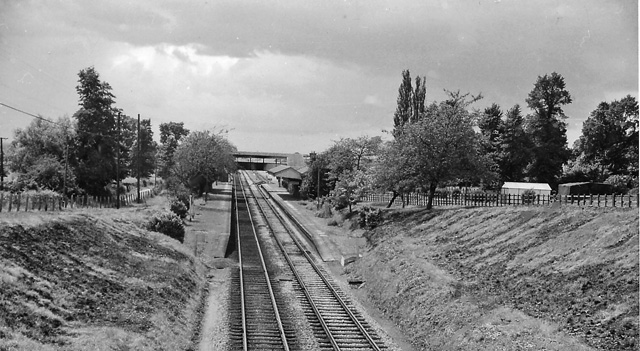
Brinkworth station in 1961, shortly after closure

Brinkworth station, on the southern outskirts of the village near the road to Dauntsey and Grittenham, was opened at the same time as the Badminton Line in 1903. There were two platforms with buildings of brick and stone, a footbridge, goods yard and cattle pens, and a station master's house next to the road. Traffic (both goods and passengers) was always light and the station closed in 1961. The station was demolished but the house remains as a private residence.

== Local government ==
The civil parish elects a parish council. It is in the area of Wiltshire Council unitary authority, which is responsible for all significant local government functions.

An electoral ward of the same name exists. From Brinkworth the ward stretches west to Great Somerford and northwest to Crudwell. The ward's population at the 2011 census was 4,483.

== Notable people ==
Landscape artist Thomas Hearne moved to Brinkworth aged five. His biographer, Simon Fenwick, suggests that nearby Malmesbury Abbey proved an inspiration to Hearne's later interest in Gothic architecture. The writer and philosopher Roger Scruton lived at Sunday Hill Farm.

== Schools ==
Brinkworth has a primary school, named Brinkworth Earl Danby's CE VC Primary School after it amalgamated in 1992 with the school at Dauntsey, 2 miles (3.2 km) to the southwest. The building opened as a National School in 1868 which became Brinkworth County School in the 20th century; the original building is still in use, with classrooms in an adjacent building which was opened in 1993.

There was also a school attached to Brinkworth Methodist chapel, which was in use in 1859.

A small school, Lady Holland's, opened at Grittenham in 1864. This school closed in 1927 owing to falling pupil numbers.

== Amenities ==
The village has a village hall and a public house, the Three Crowns.

== Bibliography ==
- The Court Records of Brinkworth and Charlton, 1544–1648, ed. Douglas Crowley (Wiltshire Record Society Vol. 61, 2009)
