= Bremilham =

Former civil parish in Wiltshire, England

Coordinates: 51.573°N 2.141°W

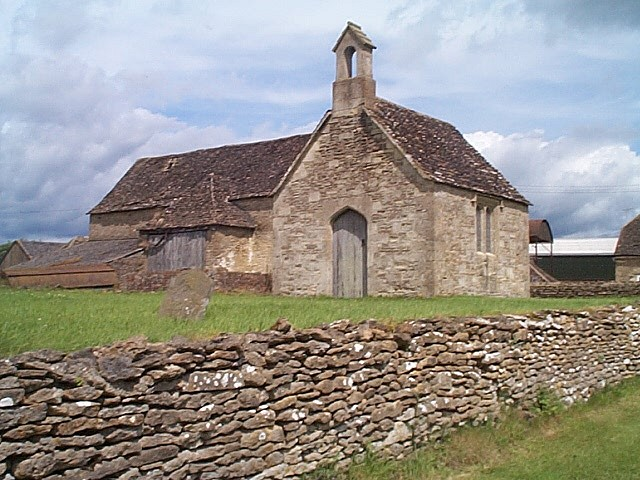
- Bremilham Church, Cowage Farm

- Location within Wiltshire
- OS grid reference: ST903860
- Civil parish: Norton
- Unitary authority: Wiltshire
- Ceremonial county: Wiltshire
- Region: South West
- Country: England
- Sovereign state: United Kingdom
- Post town: MALMESBURY
- Postcode district: SN16
- Police: Wiltshire
- Fire: Dorset and Wiltshire
- Ambulance: South Western
- UK Parliament: South Cotswolds

Bremilham, also known as Cowage or Cowich, is a small settlement and former civil parish in north Wiltshire, England. It is near the hamlet of Foxley in the parish of Norton. The nearest town is Malmesbury, about 2 miles (3.2 km) away to the north east.

The place-name 'Bremilham' is first attested in 1065, as Bremelham, and means 'village where brambles or blackberries grew'. In 1881 the parish had a population of 25. On 25 March 1884 the parish was abolished and its land divided among Foxley, Westport St Mary and Brokenborough parishes. In 1934 Foxley (with Bremilham) was transferred to the civil parish of Norton. On some present-day maps, only Cowage Farm is shown.

Bremilham was a small ecclesiastical parish until 1893 when it was united with Foxley.

== Church ==
There was probably a chapel at Bremilham in 1179, when Amesbury Priory was granted the tithes; by 1289 there was a rector. In 1874 the benefice was united with Foxley, and from 1951 Foxley with Bremilham was held in plurality with that of Corston with Rodbourne. Today the parish is part of the Gauzebrook group of churches.

Bremilham's tiny Church of England church claims to be the smallest in England, measuring ten feet by eleven feet. It is either the surviving part of a 15th-century church (Historic England) or a mid-19th century rebuild on the site of the chancel of the demolished church, for use as a mortuary chapel (Victoria County History). The building was recorded as Grade II listed in 1986.

One service is held each year. The church has no dedication and the parish registers go back only to 1813.

On 26 or 27 February 2020 the church bell, which used to hang on an oak beam inside the church, was stolen. The bell was originally from the church in Foxley which swapped its bell for Bremilham's in the 1870s.
