= Norton, Wiltshire =

Village in Wiltshire, England

Coordinates: 51.558°N 2.166°W

Norton
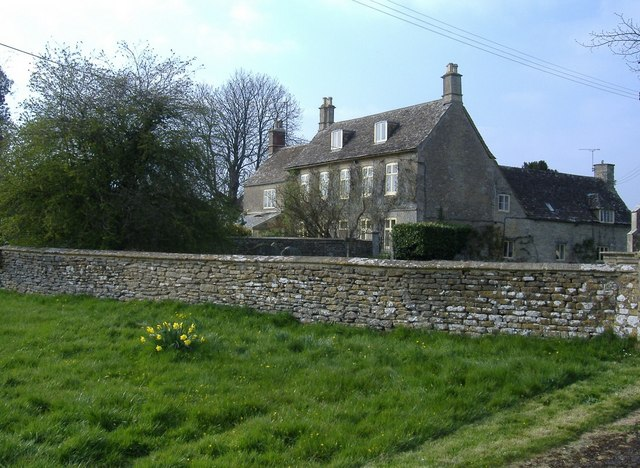
- Foxley House

- Location within Wiltshire
- Population: 118 (in 2011)
- OS grid reference: ST886844
- Civil parish: Norton
- Unitary authority: Wiltshire
- Ceremonial county: Wiltshire
- Region: South West
- Country: England
- Sovereign state: United Kingdom
- Post town: Malmesbury
- Postcode district: SN16
- Dialling code: 01666
- Police: Wiltshire
- Fire: Dorset and Wiltshire
- Ambulance: South Western
- UK Parliament: South Cotswolds

Norton is a small village and civil parish in Wiltshire, England, about 3.5 miles (5.6 km) south-west of Malmesbury. The parish includes the hamlets of Foxley and Bremilham (also known as Cowage).

The Sherston branch of the Bristol Avon forms the north boundary of the parish.

== History ==
Bronze Age ring ditches and signs of early medieval or Saxon settlement are in the east of the parish, near Cowage Farm.

The Fosse Way Roman road forms the west boundary of the parish, where it is a bridleway. The 1086 Domesday survey recorded 15 households at Nortone and 10 at Foxelege.

The east–west road between Malmesbury and Sherston passes through Foxley and Bremilham. From the late 17th century until 1756 this was the main route between Oxford and Bristol.

Foxley and Bremilham were separate ecclesiastical parishes until 1893 when Bremilham was united with Foxley. In 1934 Foxley (with Bremilham) was transferred to the civil parish of Norton.

== Religious sites ==
=== Norton ===
The Anglican Church of All Saints at Norton is Grade II listed. There was probably a church in the 13th century, which was rebuilt in the 15th and restored in 1854 for Joseph Neeld of Grittleton House. A font from the late 12th or early 13th century survives from the earlier church.

Today All Saints, together with the churches at Foxham and Bremilham, is part of the Gauzebrook group of churches.

=== Foxley ===
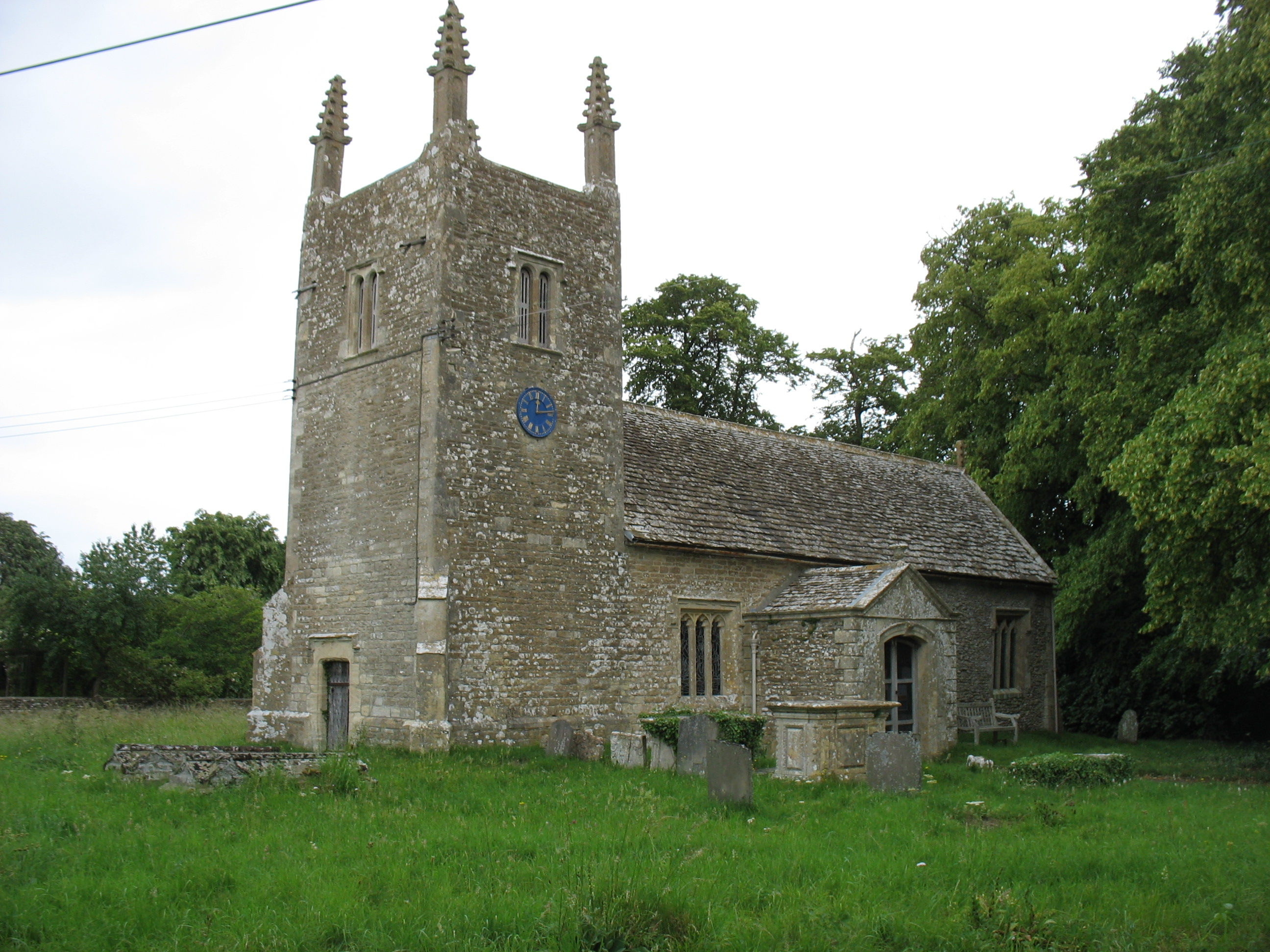
Foxley church

There was a church at Foxley in the 12th century or earlier, perhaps linked to Malmesbury Abbey. There was a rector by 1300. The small church, which has no dedication, is built of coursed rubble with some herringbone masonry. Thirteenth-century work survives in the north arcade and the font is from the same period.

The church was altered and re-roofed in the 15th century, and the tower built or rebuilt. In the 17th century the south aisle and north chapel were demolished, and around 1708 the south porch with stone pediment was added. A clock by Charles Frodsham & Co was installed in the tower in 1873. The interior of the church was renovated in the early 20th century; it was recorded as Grade I listed in 1959.

In 1874, the benefice was authorized to be united with Bremilham, and this became effective in 1893; by that time parishioners of Bremilham attended Foxley church. At the same time Foxley's cracked bell was swapped with the intact one at Bremilham. From 1951 the benefice of Foxley with Bremilham was held in plurality with that of Corston with Rodbourne.

=== Bremilham ===
The small church at Cowage Farm, Bremilham is the remainder or partial rebuilding of a 15th-century church, used for a time as a mortuary chapel.

== Manor houses ==
There are two manor houses. Norton Manor is from the early 17th century and is Grade II* listed.

Foxley Manor is from a similar date and is Grade II listed. (Not to be confused with Foxley House, next to the church and also Grade II listed).

== Local government ==
There is no elected parish council, instead an annual Parish meeting is held. The parish is in the area of Wiltshire Council unitary authority, which is responsible for all significant local government functions.

== Amenities ==
Norton has a pub and restaurant, the Vine Tree.
