= Christian Malford =

Village and civil parish in Wiltshire, England

Coordinates: 51.507°N 2.053°W

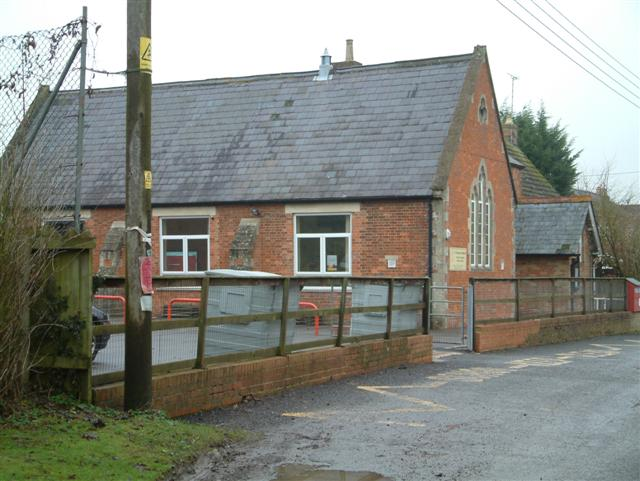
- 19th-century school, Christian Malford

- Location within Wiltshire
- Population: 780 (In 2021)
- OS grid reference: ST964787
- Civil parish: Christian Malford
- Unitary authority: Wiltshire
- Ceremonial county: Wiltshire
- Region: South West
- Country: England
- Sovereign state: United Kingdom
- Post town: Chippenham
- Postcode district: SN15
- Dialling code: 01249
- Police: Wiltshire
- Fire: Dorset and Wiltshire
- Ambulance: South Western
- UK Parliament: South Cotswolds
- Website: Parish Council

Christian Malford is a village and civil parish in the county of Wiltshire, England. The village lies about 4 1/2 miles (7 km) northeast of the town of Chippenham. The Bristol Avon forms most of the northern and eastern boundaries of the parish. The hamlets of Thornend and Upper Town lie within the parish.

The name is a corruption of Christ mal Ford, Old English moel, mal being a mark: "Christ’s mal" is Christ's mark or sign, the cross. Thus the name signified "ford by a cross". Deeds from Glastonbury Abbey cartulary relate to Christmalford Manor: in AD 940 King Edmund granted Christmalford to St Dunstan, Abbot of Glastonbury. In 1086 the Abbey of Glastonbury remained tenant-in-chief of Cristemeleforee in the ancient Domesday hundred of Sterchelai (Startley). Christian Malford and the other parishes of Startley hundred were amalgamated with additional parishes to form the hundred of Malmesbury.

== Fossils ==
The village is known to palaeontologists as a rediscovered Lagerstätte, a site of remarkably preserved fossils, in this case in the Middle Jurassic Oxford clay, in which a chance discovery in the 19th century uncovered thousands of exquisitely preserved ammonites, fish and crustaceans. The site, whose exact location had not been publicly disclosed, became most famous for squid-like cephalopods and belemnites, complete with their phosphatized soft parts. The site was rediscovered in 2008.

== Religious sites ==
=== Parish church ===
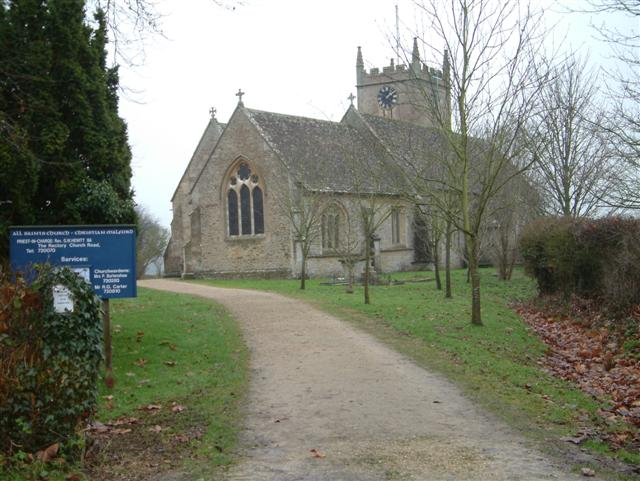
All Saints' church

The Church of England parish church of All Saints, close to the river, is a Grade I listed building. The church dates from c. 1300 but has evidence of an earlier building. The south aisle and chapel were added in the 14th century; the tower is 18th-century with 14th-century lower stages. Inside, the font is c. 1200 and the chapel screen from the 15th century is richly carved. Several windows have fragments of 15th-century glass.

The church underwent restoration in the 19th century and was re-ordered in the 1990s. The parish is now part of the Draycot Benefice.

=== Congregational chapel ===
A Congregational chapel named Shecaniah was built in 1836, near the main road on the western outskirts of the village, not far from the river bridge. William Jay (1769–1853), later an eminent preacher, was pastor here during his early career in the late 1780s. A schoolroom was added in 1909 and later in the century the congregation joined the United Reformed Church. The chapel closed in 1998, then was converted for residential use.

== Transport ==
Christian Malford is near a crossing point of the Avon, which in this area flows south from Malmesbury to Chippenham. The centre of settlement is to the south of the main road, which in the past was the A420 from Chippenham to Swindon (via Lyneham and Royal Wootton Bassett). The M4 motorway, built in 1971 and passing less than a mile north of the village centre, became the preferred route for traffic to and from Swindon, and in the late 1980s the A420 was redesignated as the B4069.

The Wilts & Berks Canal was built across the southeast of the parish, to the east of Thornend, and opened in this area in 1801. Completed in 1810, the canal carried goods including Somerset coal to Wootton Bassett, Swindon and beyond; it was abandoned in 1914.

The Great Western Main Line, the railway from London to Bristol, followed a similar route to the canal but further west, passing between Christian Malford and Thornend. The line opened in 1841 and in 1869 Dauntsey station opened at Dauntsey Lock, just over the eastern boundary of the parish. In 1926 a small station, Christian Malford Halt, was opened to serve the village. The station closed in 1965 when local services were withdrawn. The line remains open, with the nearest railway station being at Chippenham.

== Amenities ==
The village has a small primary school, near the church; its first building dates from 1835. There is a village hall and a pub, the Rising Sun.

In March 2024, planning permission was granted to demolish the existing village hall and build a new one in the same location.
