= Brinkworth Brook =

River in Wiltshire, England

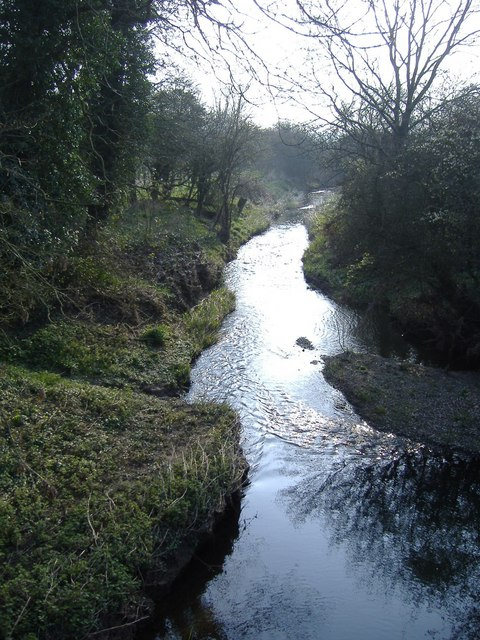
- The Brinkworth Brook, seen from Somerford Bridge, Wiltshire, England

Location
- Country: England
- Region: West of England
- District: Wiltshire

Physical characteristics
- Source: Broadtown
  - location: Broad Hinton, Wiltshire, England
  - coordinates: 51.5022°N 1.8735°W
  - elevation: 325 ft (99 m)
- Mouth: Bristol Avon
  - location: Great Somerford, Wiltshire, England
  - coordinates: 51.5454°N 2.0382°W
  - elevation: 197 ft (60 m)
- Length: 8.7 mi (14.0 km), westerly

Basin features
- Tributaries
  - right: Thunder Brook
- River system: Bristol Avon

The Brinkworth Brook is a tributary of the Bristol Avon. It rises near Broad Hinton in Wiltshire in the West Country of England, and flows in a north and then westerly direction, joining the Avon at Great Somerford.

== Course ==
The Brinkworth Brook rises at Broad Town, just north of Broad Hinton, near Royal Wootton Bassett. It flows first in a northerly direction, and then just south of Royal Wootton Bassett it is joined by minor tributaries from Westlea in Swindon and a reservoir at Tockenham Wick. The stream then passes under the M4 motorway and turns to the west past Brinkworth, joined on the right by the Thunder Brook near Dovey's Farm. At Somerford Bridge the Brinkworth Brook turns south and joins the Bristol Avon near Dauntsey House at Great Somerford.

== History ==
The brook forms the southern and part of the western boundaries of the parish of Brinkworth. There is evidence of a watermill, possibly on the Brinkworth Brook in the 16th century.

== Natural history ==
The Brinkworth Brook is typical of Wiltshire's chalk streams, with gravelled beds. Floating water crowfoot Ranunculus, Desmoulin's whorl snail, the sedge Carex and the reeds Phragmitesand Glyceria maxima. In addition, "diverse fish assemblages, and [..] varied aquatic invertebrate fauna" are to be found.

== Hydrology ==
The Brinkworth Brook suffers from pollution from highway run-off, specifically the M4 motorway.
