= Seagry =

Civil parish in Wiltshire, England

Coordinates: 51.523°N 2.080°W

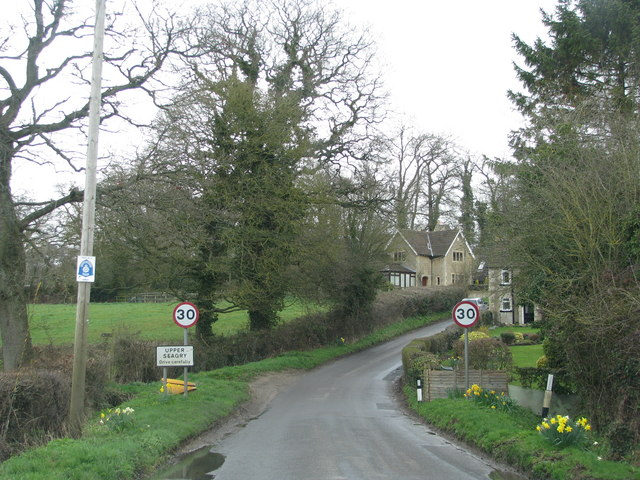
- Approach to Upper Seagry

- Location within Wiltshire
- Population: 285 (2011 census)
- OS grid reference: ST9480
- Unitary authority: Wiltshire
- Ceremonial county: Wiltshire
- Region: South West
- Country: England
- Sovereign state: United Kingdom
- Post town: Chippenham
- Postcode district: SN15
- Dialling code: 01249
- Police: Wiltshire
- Fire: Dorset and Wiltshire
- Ambulance: South Western
- UK Parliament: South Cotswolds
- Website: Parish Council

Seagry is a civil parish in Wiltshire, England, about 4.5 miles (7.2 km) southeast of Malmesbury and 5.5 miles (8.9 km) northeast of Chippenham. Its main settlements are the village of Upper Seagry, which was first mentioned in official records under the name Over Seagry (in 1317), and the hamlet of Lower Seagry, which was first documented (1218) as Nether Seagry.

The toponym is thought to derive from the Old English for "sedge stream". Sedge is the common name for plants of the family Cyperaceae and stream here may refer to the River Avon, which flows through the area.

== History ==
There is evidence that the area was settled in the Upper Paleolithic period, and also of Saxon occupation. The Domesday Book of 1086 records 21 households and two manors: Segrete held by Durand of Gloucester, and Segrie by Drogo Fitz Ponz.

Segrete became part of the estates of the Earl of Hereford, and later passed into the ownership of Bradenstoke Abbey until the Dissolution of the Monasteries. A grange farm at Lower Seagry was associated with the Abbey.

Seagry is mentioned several times by Francis Kilvert in his Diary. He was living at nearby Langley Burrell at the time, and visited the Awdry family at Seagry vicarage.

Seagry House at Upper Seagry was a five-bay mansion built in the 18th century by Nathaniel Stratton and extended to designs of Harold Brakspear in 1915. The house was rebuilt after a 1949 fire but the 18th-century gatepiers at the east and south entrances survive.

The Seagry House estate was bought in 1785 by Sir James Tylney-Long of Draycot Cerne. Through inheritance and marriage it passed down to William, 5th Earl of Mornington (1813–1863) and then Henry Wellesley, 1st Earl Cowley (1804–1884). Christian Wellesley, 4th Earl Cowley sold most of the land in 1920, but the house remained in the Cowley family until 1949.

== Upper Seagry ==
The village is on a minor road between Malmesbury and Sutton Benger at grid reference ST 947 807. It has a modern village hall, run jointly with Great Somerford and Startley, a public house called The New Inn, and Seagry CofE (VC) Primary School. The school was founded in 1966 and has about 40 pupils. In 2008 the school federated (a process whereby two or more schools choose to share resources, in this case a shared headteacher and governing body) with Somerford's Walter Powell CofE (VA) school in Great Somerford.

== Lower Seagry ==
The hamlet is east of Upper Seagry at grid reference ST 958 810, towards Great Somerford.

== Local government ==
The civil parish elects a parish council. It is in the area of Wiltshire Council unitary authority, which is responsible for all significant local government functions.

The present parish was formed in 1971. The ancient parish was added to Sutton Benger parish in 1934, then in 1971 the newly built M4 motorway became the boundary between the parishes of Sutton Benger and Seagry.

== Religious sites ==
The Church of England parish church of St Mary the Virgin at Lower Seagry was founded in 1172 by Walter de Clifford, a descendant of the Fitz Ponz family. One of the 13th-century effigies in the church is said to be his. The church was rebuilt in 1849 on the same plan as the 12th or 13th century building by one of the architects in the Hakewill family, in squared rubble stone with a west bellcote. The 12th-century stone font bowl and 15th-century timber altar screen were retained. Today the parish is part of the Draycot benefice, a group of five churches.

A Primitive Methodist chapel was built at Upper Seagry in 1825. It fell into disuse some time before 2010, and was later sold for residential use.

== See also ==
- The hamlet of Seagry Heath is in Great Somerford parish.
