= Malmesbury branch line =

Railway line in Wiltshire, England

The Malmesbury branch was a six-and-a-half-mile-long single track branch railway line in Wiltshire, England; it ran from Dauntsey station on the Great Western Main Line to Malmesbury. Promoted locally, it opened with considerable assistance from the Great Western Railway in 1877, and used the standard gauge. There was one intermediate station, Somerford.

In 1933 the connection to the main line network was brought closer to Malmesbury, joining the 1903 Badminton line at Little Somerford, and the original section to Dauntsey was closed.

The line closed to passengers in 1951, and completely in 1962.

== History ==
=== False start ===
Wilts and Gloucestershire Railway Act 1864 (Note: Section 2.)
- Act of Parliament
- Parliament of the United Kingdom
- Long title: An Act for making a Railway from Christian Malford in the County of Wilts to Nailsworth in the County of Gloucester; and for other Purposes.
- Citation: 27 & 28 Vict. c. ccxxii
- Territorial extent: United Kingdom

Dates
- Royal assent: 25 July 1864
- Commencement: 25 July 1864 (Note: The Acts of Parliament (Commencement) Act 1793.)
- Repealed: 31 January 2013
Other legislation
Repealed by	Statute Law (Repeals) Act 2013

Status: Repealed

Text of statute as originally enacted

When the Great Western Railway (GWR) opened its first main line from London to Bristol, the ancient Borough of Malmesbury was not on the route, and Chippenham station, ten miles away became the railhead for coach services from the town. A number of railway schemes were put forward in the 1840s, and many of them would have formed a north–south route through Malmesbury, but it was not until 1864 that a viable scheme was approved by Parliament. This was the Wilts and Gloucestershire Railway (W&GR), which received royal assent for the Wilts and Gloucestershire Railway Act 1864 (27 & 28 Vict. c. ccxxii) on 25 July 1864. (Note: Wilts and Gloucestershire Railway is the proper title the company was incorporated under per section 4 of the act; Fenton uses Wiltshire and Gloucestershire Railway on page 13 and Wilts and Glos Railway on page 14; he quotes the scheme as "being finally sanctioned in the Commons on 21st June 1864" but the bill was not enacted until royal assent was given on 25 July.)

The W&GR was to run from Stroud via Nailsworth and Malmesbury to Christian Malford; ostensibly connecting two GWR routes. However, the Midland Railway was actively promoting its line to Nailsworth, and the W&GR would give them access into GWR territory, something the GWR wished to resist at all costs. The W&GR proposed building with mixed gauge track, to enable Midland Railway standard gauge (sometimes referred to as narrow gauge) trains as well as GWR broad gauge trains to run. If the W&GR intended to work with both companies, it seems to have alienated both of them; but unabashed, the company cut the first sod on 1 July 1865 at Malmesbury, amid much celebration. At the half-yearly meeting of the company in February 1866 the secretary was obliged to report that construction work had been suspended due to the "unexpected" refusal of the GWR to come to a working agreement, as was required by the authorising act of Parliament. The Board of Trade appointed an arbitrator, who ruled against the granting of running powers to the Midland.

This was a bitter blow, and the company found itself unable to proceed. It is not clear why it could not continue as an ally of the GWR alone, but it suspended all expenditure, and attempts to revive the scheme proved futile. The company applied for a warrant of abandonment and it ceased to exist on 17 March 1871; all the parliamentary and other expenses had achieved nothing.

=== Local schemes ===
Malmesbury Railway Act 1872
- Act of Parliament
- Parliament of the United Kingdom
- Long title: An Act for making a Railway from the Great Western Railway at Dauntsey, in the county of Wilts, to Malmesbury, in the same county; and for other purposes.
- Citation: 35 & 36 Vict. c. cxlviii
- Territorial extent: United Kingdom

Dates
- Royal assent: 25 July 1872
- Commencement: 25 July 1872

Status: Current legislation

Feelings in the town were strong that they needed a railway, and one that had local orientation, and a meeting took place with the GWR concerning a purely local branch from Dauntsey station, which had opened in 1868. A practical line was conceived, costing £60,000, of which the GWR would subscribe half. The plan was enthusiastically received in the town, and the Malmesbury Railway Act 1872 (35 & 36 Vict. c. cxlviii) received royal assent on 25 July 1872. By this time the gauge of the GWR main line at Dauntsey had been mixed, providing for either broad gauge or standard gauge trains to run. It was tacitly understood that the broad gauge would not last forever, and the Malmesbury Railway was to be built on the standard gauge. The capital was to be £60,000, half of which the GWR was authorised to subscribe; and a working arrangement with the GWR was confirmed.

In March 1873 the GWR asked for a modification of the route to avoid the close proximity to areas of the areas of the River Avon subject to flooding; an acceptable alternative route was found, which improved gradients and shortened the route.

=== Construction ===
There was to be a short tunnel at Holloway, on the edge of Malmesbury, and there was some uncertainty about the construction; the contractor started work on the basis of an open cutting, but soon reverted to tunnelling. Exceptionally bad weather delayed the construction process and damaged part of the completed works. In addition, tension between the main contractor Budd & Holt and the company's engineer Ward led to delays and an arbitration award, and the construction was heading for an overspend. On 6 July 1876 the GWR, as the financier of last resort, agree to provide £19,000 for the completion of the line; their own engineer Lancaster Owen was to be installed as Joint Engineer with Ward, although the former was prime.

Budd & Holt continued to proceed more slowly than was desirable, complaining of sums due to them not being paid. However, on two occasions in August 1876 the contractor on their own account carried passengers informally on the incomplete line; this action scandalised the company and the contractor was warned not to repeat the arrangement. Early in 1877 it emerged that a further £19,000 was required to complete the line and to settle claims from Budd & Holt; the company planned to go to Parliament for supplementary powers to raise the money, but were persuaded to obtain the funding by local loans instead. Nonetheless Budd & Holt must have decided to have done with the scheme and made it clear that they would only continue work on new terms. At a special shareholders' meeting on 25 April 1877 the majority of shareholders agreed to sell their shares at a loss to the GWR, on the basis that the larger company would then complete the work. A minority of shareholders refused, preventing an outright sale, but the GWR now had the controlling majority. Budd & Holt's contract was terminated by mutual consent in June 1877 and the GWR proceeded to complete the line. The remaining work was chiefly ballasting and a contract was let to George Drew of Chalford.

The remaining works were swiftly executed, and Colonel Yolland of the Board of Trade inspected the line on 20 November. On 29 November a special inspection train conveying Sir Daniel Gooch and others ran on the line; on 12 December a cattle train left Malmesbury for the main line. On 14 December Colonel Rich of the Board of Trade carried out a final inspection for passenger operation, finding it satisfactory subject to minor signalling changes at Dauntsey, the main line junction.

=== Grand opening ===
Accordingly, the line was ceremonially opened amongst great celebration on 17 December 1877, and to ordinary public operation the following day. There were six mixed (passenger and goods) trains each way, Monday to Saturday. It was a single track of standard gauge, using Vignoles (flat-bottom) rails. The "one engine in steam" system of operation was to be used and there was one intermediate station at Somerford (later named Great Somerford), which did not have goods facilities at first. The junction with the GWR main line was at Dauntsey, between Swindon and Chippenham, where branch trains had a bay platform. Branch trains did not run beyond Dauntsey; there was a short length of loop siding alongside the branch line at Dauntsey, used for running round passenger trains. The line was 6 miles 4 furlongs and 1 1/2 chains (10.5 km) in length; there was a tunnel at Malmesbury, and the station there was on Gloucester Road just beyond Stanes river bridge. The construction had cost £76,565 so far—the final cost was to be £87,094.

Somerford's goods facilities opened on 1 January 1879; inward traffic was largely agricultural feed and coal.

On 3 March 1880 torrential rainstorms resulted in floodwater in the River Avon, which damaged Poole's Bridge, between Dauntsey and Somerford. The line was severed for five days.

It had long been evident that the company's destiny lay with the Great Western Railway and absorption had been talked of for some time. This was implemented on 1 July 1880 and confirmed by the Great Western Railway Act 1880 (43 & 44 Vict. c. cxli) on 6 August 1880. The Malmesbury Railway Company ceased to exist.

=== The Badminton line ===
At this time the Great Western Railway route from London to South Wales ran from Swindon to the Severn Tunnel via Box. The company was spurred by a rival scheme to consider shortening the route, and the South Wales and Bristol Direct Railway, an offshoot of the GWR, was authorised in 1896. The route became known as the Badminton Line, and was to leave the old GWR main line at Wootton Bassett (Note: Now Royal Wootton Bassett) and run on a substantially straight alignment to Patchway, where it would join the old route to the Severn Tunnel. This new route would come closer to Malmesbury, but not through the town. During the ensuing years a number of petitions were presented without success to the GWR by the town authorities, proposing that the new line should run through Malmesbury, or that the branch line should directly connect to it.

The construction of the new line proceeded and it was fully opened in July 1903. There was a station at Little Somerford. In anticipation of the opening, to avoid confusion, Somerford station on the Malmesbury branch was renamed Great Somerford from 1 January 1903. The new line crossed over the old branch adjacent to the River Avon near Little Somerford.

In the 1920s and 1930s the GWR had been examining the means by which the operating expenses of branch lines might be reduced, and a proposal was put forward to make the Malmesbury branch join the Badminton line at Little Somerford, instead of Dauntsey on the Chippenham line. This was approved, and the main construction work, a connecting link at Little Somerford on a gradient of 1 in 50 up to the Badminton line, started on 9 May 1932. On 17 July 1933 the new connection opened and the Dauntsey section was closed; Little Somerford was the junction station for Malmesbury, and Great Somerford station closed.

The main line stopping service at Little Somerford was sparse – four trains each way daily – but there was a morning through train from Swindon, an afternoon through train from Malmesbury to Wootton Bassett, and an evening round trip to Swindon. The Malmesbury branch train used the main line platforms, as no bay was provided.

=== Stabling on the Dauntsey line ===
Following closure of the Dauntsey section, the former line was used for wagon storage. From July 1934 the configuration was changed to give access from the Somerford end, a connection being laid in specially, referred to as Kingsmead Siding.

=== Closure ===
After the Second World War, passenger usage of the line declined abruptly; a two-hourly regular bus service from Swindon to Bristol via Malmesbury was started in 1948, providing greater convenience than the train service, and other services to Chippenham and elsewhere soon followed. A survey showed that only 23 passengers used the 11:35 train from Malmesbury in a sample week. Closure was inevitable despite local opposition, and the last train ran on 8 September 1951.

Goods traffic continued on the branch; Malmesbury signal box was abolished in 1956, with the yard points being hand worked. Business continued to decline and total closure of the branch took place on 11 November 1962.
