= Great Somerford =

Village in Wiltshire, England

Coordinates: 51.543°N 2.054°W

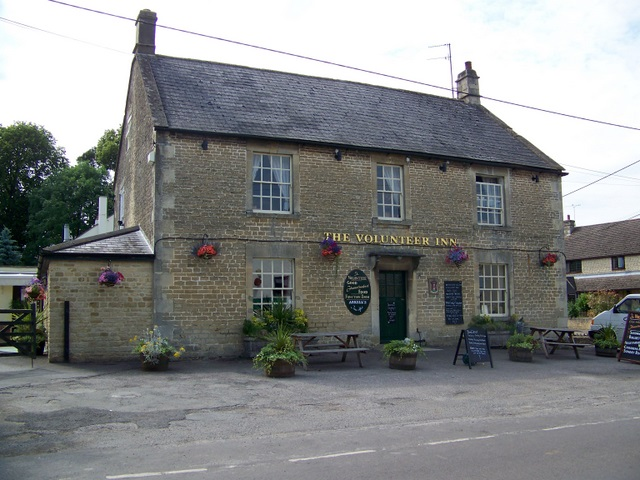
- The Volunteer Inn, Great Somerford

- Location within Wiltshire
- Population: 737 (in 2011)
- OS grid reference: ST964827
- Unitary authority: Wiltshire
- Ceremonial county: Wiltshire
- Region: South West
- Country: England
- Sovereign state: United Kingdom
- Post town: CHIPPENHAM
- Postcode district: SN15
- Dialling code: 01249
- Police: Wiltshire
- Fire: Dorset and Wiltshire
- Ambulance: South Western
- UK Parliament: South Cotswolds
- Website: Parish Council

Great Somerford is a village and civil parish within Dauntsey Vale, Wiltshire, England, near the south bank of the river Avon. It lies approximately 3 1/4 miles (5.2 km) southeast of Malmesbury and 12 miles (19 km) west of Swindon. The hamlet of Startley and the area known as Seagry Heath are within the bounds of the parish.

The parish boundaries to the northeast and east follow the Avon, or in some places the river's former course. In the northwest the boundary partly follows the Rodbourne stream, a small tributary which joins the Avon northwest of the village. The Brinkworth Brook joins the Avon in the northwest corner of the parish.

== History ==
Eight estates were recorded in the 1086 Domesday Book at the Somerfords, with altogether 80 households. The mound of a motte castle, 40 metres in diameter and probably from the 12th century, stands immediately east of the church. South of the mound is the Mount House, a 16th-century manor house, refronted in the 19th and now Grade II* listed.

In 1377 there were 92 poll-tax payers at Great Somerford and 10 at Startley. The population of the parish grew from 358 at the 1801 census to 481 in 1821, then remained in the range 500–556 until 1911, falling to 421 in 1921. Housebuilding in the 1960s and 1980s brought numbers above 700.

=== Allotment gardens ===
Great Somerford Inclosure Act 1806
- Act of Parliament
- Parliament of the United Kingdom
- Long title: An act for inclosing lands in the parish of Great-Somerford, otherwise Broad-Somerford, in the county of Wilts.
- Citation: 46 Geo. 3. c. 63 Pr.

Dates
- Royal assent: 3 July 1806

Great Somerford has Britain's first allotments. Enclosure of common land, facilitated by the Inclosure Act 1773, greatly reduced the amount of land available for personal cultivation by the poor. Stephen Demainbray, rector 1799–1854 and a chaplain to King George III, asked the King to spare part of his parish from the Great Somerford Inclosure Act 1806 (46 Geo. 3. c. 63 Pr.). A field of about 6 acres (2.4 ha) in the south of the village on Dauntsey Road became the Free Gardens, in exchange for pieces of common land elsewhere; there was a second site of about 2 acres at Seagry Heath. Plots were allotted to villagers for one-year terms.

The Free Gardens continue in use; the Seagry Heath site reverted to private ownership. The 200th anniversary in 2009 was marked by an edition of the BBC Radio 4 programme, Gardeners' Question Time.

=== Railway ===
The Malmesbury Branch Line was opened across the parish in 1877, leaving the Great Western Main Line at Dauntsey and crossing the Avon just north of Great Somerford village. A station, at first named Somerford, was just east of the river crossing.

The name of the station was changed to Great Somerford in 1903 when the GWR opened a more direct route to South Wales, passing half a mile (900 metres) to the north near Little Somerford, where a new station was built. In 1922 the goods yard at Great Somerford was closed and the station was downgraded to Great Somerford Halt. In 1933, Little Somerford station was linked to the Malmesbury branch and became the junction station. The line south to Dauntsey, along with the halt, was closed in July of that year.

== Religious sites ==
=== Parish church ===
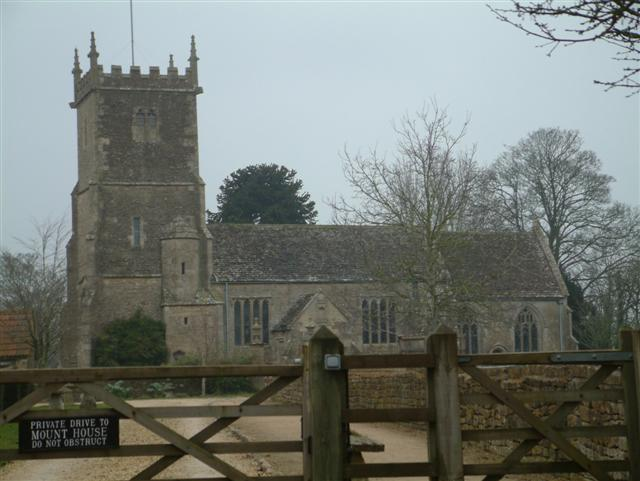
Parish Church

There was a church at Great Somerford in the late 12th century. The present Church of England parish church of St Peter and St Paul is built of rubble stone and is from the 14th and 15th centuries, with restoration in 1865 by J.H. Hakewill. Decoration of the chancel roof in 1901 to designs of F.C. Eden was described by Pevsner as "extremely prettily painted with stylized flowers". The south porch was rebuilt in 1905 using old materials.

The tower carries six bells: one of c. 1480 and another of 1634. The ashlar gate piers, with stone urns, at the entrance to the churchyard are 18th century.

The church was designated as Grade I listed in 1959. Today the parish forms part of the Woodbridge Group of six churches.

=== Methodists ===
Primitive Methodists were meeting at Startley by 1843, and in 1850–51 an average congregation of 90 attended Sunday services. A chapel was built in 1854, just south of the junction with Heath Lane, and was extended in 1860. The chapel closed in 1985 and is now a private house; the small cemetery on the opposite side of the road remains.

At Great Somerford, Methodists bought the red brick village reading room in 1882 for use as a chapel. (The reading room had been built in 1872 at the expense of Wiltshire MP Walter Powell and was sold following his death.) In 2016 the building was still in use as a Methodist church within the North Wiltshire circuit, holding fortnightly services which alternate with the church at Cleverton.

== Governance ==
The civil parish elects a parish council. It is in the area of Wiltshire Council, a unitary authority, which is responsible for most significant local government functions. For Westminster elections, the parish is part of the South Cotswolds constituency.

== Amenities ==
The first purpose-built school at Great Somerford was built in 1828, then enlarged in 1850, 1870 and 1895. Children of all ages attended until 1954, when those aged 11 and over went to Malmesbury secondary school. In 1982, Somerfords' Walter Powell Primary School was built on a new site to the east of the village, to replace the 19th-century school and that at Little Somerford.

Great Somerford has a shop with Post Office. There is also a pub, the Volunteer Inn, a building from the early 19th century.

== Landmarks ==
=== Great Somerford Measuring Station ===
In 1963 the Environment Agency constructed a river level measuring station consisting of one of the earliest compound crump weirs in Britain. The typical river level range is between 15 and 70 centimetres; the highest level recorded was 2.43 metres. During the widespread flooding in 2007, the river level reached 2.06 metres on 21 July, whilst flooding in July 1968 drowned the entire structure.

=== World War II pillboxes ===
There are three remaining Second World War pillboxes in the village. The first faces the river and the disused railway. The second is on the edge of a medium-sized field next to the Avon; there has been no damage to this pillbox, though in heavy rain it tends to flood. The third pillbox is along the left of Dauntsey Road, opposite a small cottage.
