= Dauntsey railway station =

Former railway station in England

Coordinates: 51.5218°N 2.0089°W

Dauntsey
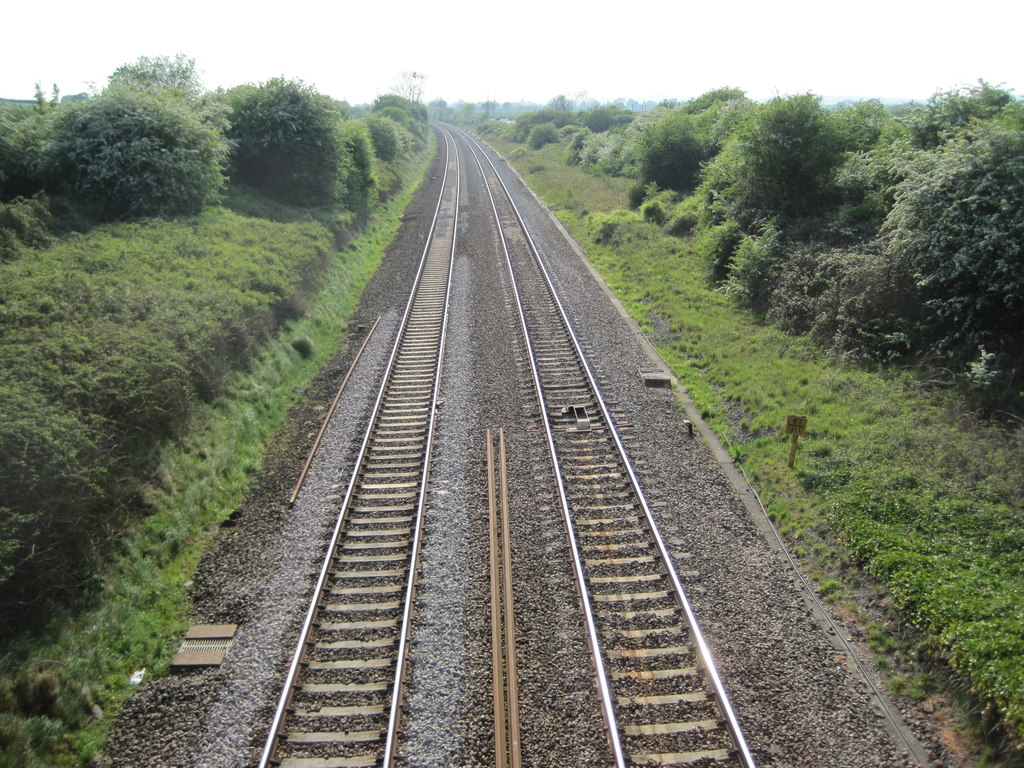
- The site of the station in 2011

General information
- Location: Dauntsey, County of Wiltshire; England
- Platforms: 3

Other information
- Status: Disused

History
- Original company: Great Western Railway
- Pre-grouping: Great Western Railway
- Post-grouping: Great Western Railway

Key dates
- 1 Feb 1868: Opened
- 4 Jan 1965: Closed
Location

Dauntsey railway station served the village of Dauntsey, Wiltshire from 1868 to 1965. It was situated on the Great Western Main Line which runs from London to Bristol.

The station site is a mile and a half south of Dauntsey village and is near Dauntsey Lock which suggests that the station was important to the Wilts & Berks Canal. Dauntsey was a small station with three platforms, two of which are similar in length to the platforms at Corsham which is further down the line between Chippenham and Bath. The station had a main building with a canopy on the up platform (towards London) and the platform on the opposite side had a small brick shelter, also with a canopy.

Dauntsey station became the junction for the branch line to Malmesbury in 1877. The up platform was extended west of the road bridge with a bay platform to accommodate trains on the branch line. When the GWR built the South Wales Main Line in 1903 it passed a few miles north of Dauntsey. In 1933 the connection between the Malmesbury branch and the main line was moved to Little Somerford on the newer main line, and the redundant section between Dauntsey and Somerford became a siding. The canopy used for the branch line platform was moved to Yatton station where it can still be seen today.

Most of Dauntsey station was demolished in 1977 although the station house and the up platform remain.

| Preceding station | Historical railways | Following station |
|---|---|---|
| Christian Malford Halt; Line open, station closed | Great Western Railway; Great Western Main Line | Wootton Bassett Junction; Line open, station closed |
| | Disused railways | |
| Great Somerford Halt; Line and station closed | Great Western Railway; Malmesbury Branch Line | Terminus |
