= SN postcode area =

Postcode area within the United Kingdom

Swindon
- Postcode area
- Coordinates: 51.498°N 1.908°W
- Sovereign state: United Kingdom
- Postcode area: SN
- Postcode area name: Swindon
- Post towns: 10
- Postcode districts: 23
- Postcode sectors: 113
- Postcodes (live): 14,362
- Postcodes (total): 21,374
- Statistics as at May 2020

The SN postcode area, also known as the Swindon postcode area, is a group of eighteen postcode districts in England, within ten post towns. These cover north Wiltshire (including the Borough of Swindon, Chippenham, Calne, Corsham, Devizes, Malmesbury, Marlborough, Melksham and Pewsey), as well as a small part of south-west Oxfordshire (including Faringdon) and a very small part of Gloucestershire.

Mail for the SN postcode area is processed at Thames Valley Mail Centre in Swindon, along with mail for the OX and RG postcode areas.

== Coverage ==
The approximate coverage of the postcode districts is as follows.

Postcode district	Post town	Coverage	Local authority area(s)
SN1	SWINDON	Swindon town centre south of the railway line, Old Town, southwest suburbs	Swindon
SN2	SWINDON	Swindon town centre north of the railway line, inner suburbs to the north and northwest including Upper Stratton and Kingsdown	Swindon
SN3	SWINDON	Swindon east suburbs, Stratton St Margaret, South Marston	Swindon
SN4	SWINDON	Royal Wootton Bassett, Clyffe Pypard, Broad Town, Broad Hinton, Wroughton, Chiseldon, Liddington, Wanborough, Hinton Parva	Swindon, Wiltshire
SN5	SWINDON	West Swindon, Lydiard Millicent, Purton	Swindon, Wiltshire
SN6	SWINDON	Highworth, Cricklade, Shrivenham, Watchfield, Ashton Keynes, Ashbury, Bishopstone, Castle Eaton, Hannington, Idstone, Marston Meysey, Leigh	Swindon, Wiltshire, Vale of White Horse
SN7	FARINGDON	Faringdon, Stanford in the Vale, Uffington, Longcot, Fernham, Buckland, Great Coxwell, Little Coxwell, Littleworth, Shellingford, Buscot	Vale of White Horse
SN8	MARLBOROUGH	Marlborough, Ramsbury, Mildenhall, Aldbourne, Axford, Burbage, Baydon, Great Bedwyn	Wiltshire
SN9	PEWSEY	Pewsey, Upavon, Enford	Wiltshire
SN10	DEVIZES	Devizes, Market Lavington, Rowde	Wiltshire
SN11	CALNE	Calne, Heddington, Hilmarton	Wiltshire
SN12	MELKSHAM	Melksham, Bowerhill, Seend, Broughton Gifford	Wiltshire
SN13	CORSHAM	Corsham, Box, Neston	Wiltshire
SN14	CHIPPENHAM	Chippenham (west), Marshfield, Kington St Michael, Hullavington, Luckington, Grittleton, Yatton Keynell, Biddestone, Colerne, Cold Ashton	Wiltshire, South Gloucestershire
SN15	CHIPPENHAM	Chippenham (east), Bromham, Sandy Lane, Lacock, Burleaze, Pewsham, Monkton Park, Foxham, Dauntsey, Seagry, Christian Malford, Bradenstoke, Sutton Benger, Lyneham, Draycot Cerne, Cleverton, Little Somerford, Langley Burrell, Great Somerford, Brinkworth	Wiltshire
SN15	CORSHAM		non-geographic
SN16	MALMESBURY	Sherston, Malmesbury, Crudwell, Minety	Wiltshire
SN25	SWINDON	Swindon outer north suburbs including Haydon Wick and Priory Vale; St Andrews	Swindon
SN26	SWINDON	Blunsdon	Swindon
SN38	SWINDON	Nationwide Building Society	non-geographic
SN80	SWINDON	Royal Wootton Bassett	Wiltshire
SN99	SWINDON		non-geographic

The SN25 and SN26 districts were formed out of the SN2 district in 1999.

== Map ==
SN postcode area map, showing postcode districts in red and post towns in grey text, with links to nearby BA, BS, GL, OX, RG and SP postcode areas.

== See also ==
- Postcode Address File
- List of postcode areas in the United Kingdom
