= South Cotswolds =

UK Parliament constituency (since 2024)

- County constituency for the House of Commons
- Boundary of South Cotswolds in South West England
- County: Gloucestershire and Wiltshire
- Electorate: 72,865 (2023)
- Major settlements: Cirencester, Tetbury, Malmesbury, Cricklade, Fairford, Lechlade, Purton

Current constituency
- Created: 2024
- Member of Parliament: Roz Savage (Liberal Democrats)
- Seats: One
- Created from: The Cotswolds; North Wiltshire

South Cotswolds is a constituency of the House of Commons in the UK Parliament. Further to the completion of the 2023 review of Westminster constituencies, it was first contested at the 2024 general election, when it was won by Roz Savage of the Liberal Democrats. She defeated James Gray, the Conservative MP for North Wiltshire from 1997 to 2024.

Previously, approximately half of its area was in The Cotswolds constituency and the rest was in the North Wiltshire constituency; thus it straddles the boundary between the historic counties of Gloucestershire and Wiltshire. The other half of the former Cotswolds constituency became part of the new North Cotswolds constituency.

== Constituency profile ==
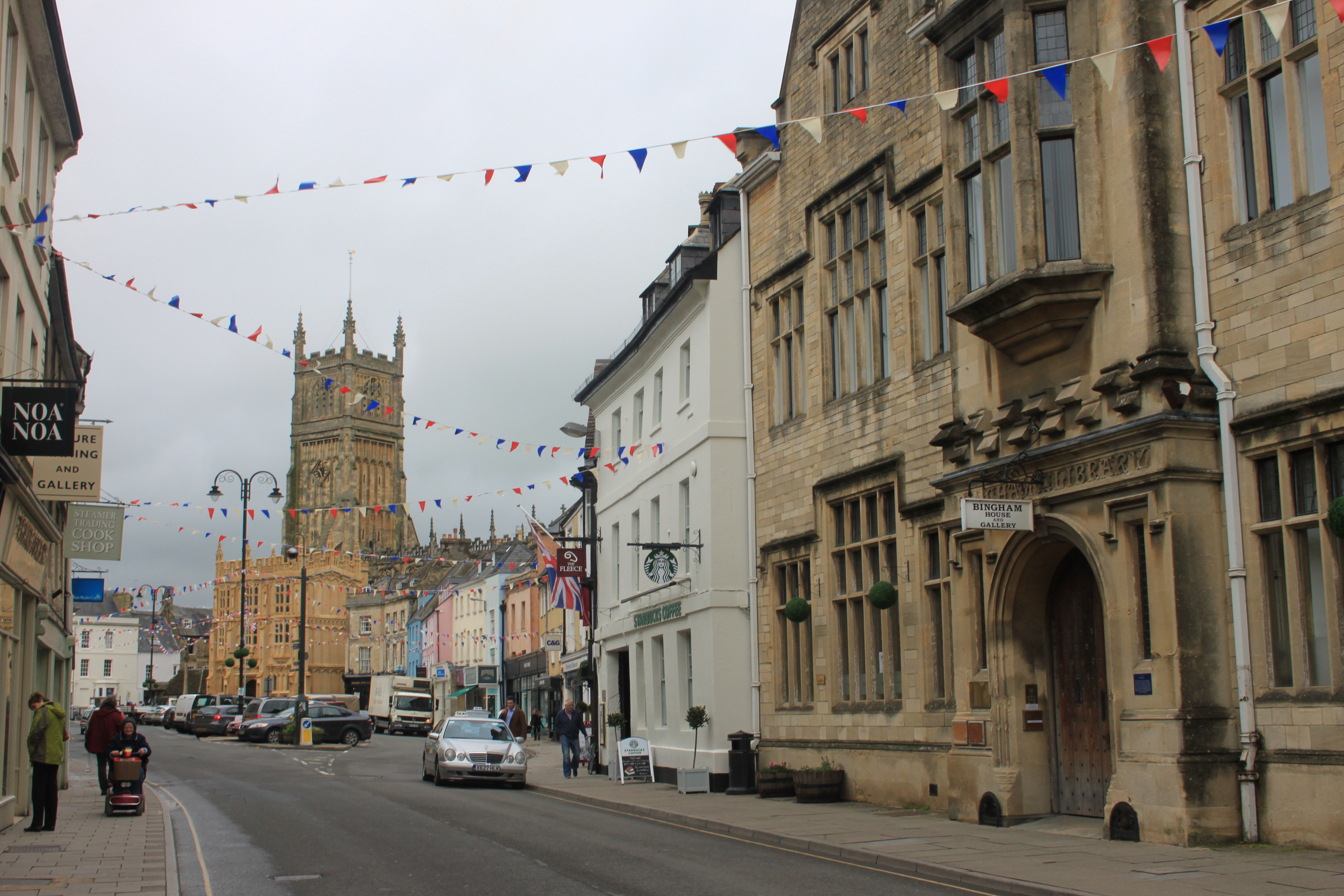
Market Place, Cirencester

South Cotswolds is a constituency in South West England, covering parts of Gloucestershire and Wiltshire. Its largest town is Cirencester, which has a population of around 18,000. Other settlements include the towns of Malmesbury, Tetbury, Cricklade, Lechlade and Fairford and the villages of Purton and South Cerney.

This constituency is named after the Cotswolds, a range of rolling hills popular with tourists for its picturesque stone-built towns and villages, although only the north-western portion of this constituency falls within the official boundaries of the National Landscape. South Cotswolds covers a large, rural area with many small settlements and historic towns; Cirencester is a market town of Roman origins and Malmesbury is known for its abbey, which was established in the 7th century. This constituency is affluent with low levels of deprivation, and house prices here are generally higher than regional and UK averages.

South Cotswolds has a large retired population and a low proportion of young adults. Residents have high levels of income and homeownership and the child poverty rate is around half the overall UK figure. They are generally well-educated and a high proportion work in the science, agriculture and tourism sectors. The percentage claiming unemployment benefits is half the UK-wide rate. White people made up 95% of the population at the 2021 census.

Almost all seats in this constituency are represented by Liberal Democrats at the local council level, with Conservative councillors elected in some rural villages. An estimated 52% of voters in South Cotswolds supported remaining in the European Union in the 2016 referendum, higher than the UK-wide figure of 48%.

== Boundaries ==
Map of boundaries from 2024

The constituency is composed of:

- The following wards of the District of Cotswold (as they existed on 1 December 2020): Abbey; Chesterton; Fairford North; Four Acres; Grumbolds Ash with Avening; Kemble; Lechlade, Kempsford & Fairford South; New Mills; St. Michael’s; Siddington & Cerney Rural; South Cerney Village; Stratton; Tetbury East & Rural; Tetbury Town; Tetbury with Upton; The Ampneys & Hampton; The Beeches; Watermoor.
- The District of Stroud ward of Kingswood (as it existed on 1 December 2020).
- The following electoral divisions of Wiltshire (as they existed on 4 May 2021): Brinkworth; By Brook; Cricklade & Latton; Kington; Malmesbury; Minety; Purton; Sherston.

It comprises the following areas:

- Just over half (by electorate) of the former constituency of The Cotswolds, including the towns of Cirencester and Tetbury
- Northern and western parts of the former constituency of North Wiltshire, including the towns of Cricklade and Malmesbury, and the large village of Purton

== Members of Parliament ==
Election	Member	Party
2024	Roz Savage	Liberal Democrats

== Election results ==
=== Elections in the 2020s ===
General election 2024: South Cotswolds
Party	Candidate	Votes	%	±%
Liberal Democrats	Roz Savage	22,961	43.9	+16.3
Conservative	James Gray	17,988	34.4	−23.5
Reform	Desi Latimer	5,146	9.8	N/A
Labour	Zoë Billingham	3,942	7.5	−3.2
Green	Bob Eastoe	1,564	3.0	−0.8
Liberal	Chris Twells	225	0.4	N/A
Independent	Sandy Steel	183	0.3	N/A
SDP	Martin Broomfield	156	0.3	N/A
Independent	Owen Humphreys	122	0.2	N/A
Majority		4,973	9.5	N/A
Turnout		52,287	73.1	+0.1
Registered electors		71,490		
Liberal Democrats gain from Conservative		Swing	+19.9	

=== Elections in the 2010s ===
2019 notional result
Party	Vote	%
Conservative	30,798	57.9
Liberal Democrats	14,706	27.6
Labour	5,669	10.7
Green	2,016	3.8
Turnout	53,189	73.0
Electorate	72,865	

== See also ==
- Parliamentary constituencies in Gloucestershire
- Parliamentary constituencies in Wiltshire
