= St Paul Malmesbury Without =

Civil parish in Wiltshire, England

Coordinates: 51.55°N 2.10°W

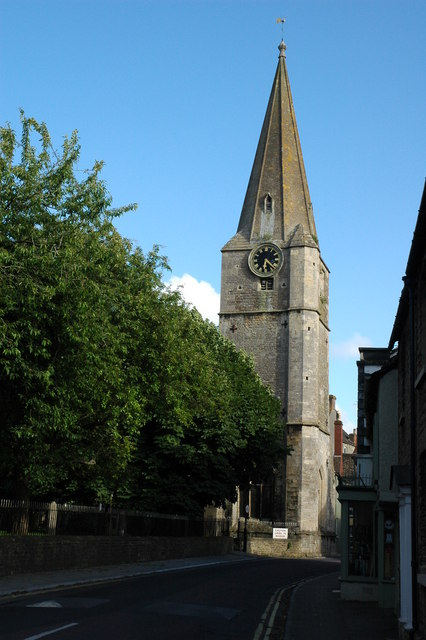
- St Paul's steeple, Malmesbury, from which the parish received its name

- Location within Wiltshire
- Population: 2,059 (in 2011)
- OS grid reference: ST9384
- Unitary authority: Wiltshire
- Ceremonial county: Wiltshire
- Region: South West
- Country: England
- Sovereign state: United Kingdom
- Post town: Malmesbury
- Postcode district: SN16
- Dialling code: 01666
- Police: Wiltshire
- Fire: Dorset and Wiltshire
- Ambulance: South Western
- UK Parliament: South Cotswolds
- Website: Parish Council

St Paul Malmesbury Without is a civil parish surrounding Malmesbury, Wiltshire, England. Its main settlements are the village of Corston and the hamlets of Milbourne and Rodbourne (not to be confused with the Rodbourne suburb of Swindon). In 2011 the parish had a population of 2059.

== Geography ==
The parish is rural with small settlements. It surrounds Malmesbury to the north, east and south (but not to the west where the parish is Brokenborough). In the southeastern outskirts of Malmesbury the parish includes houses along the B4042 Swindon road, together with the development known as Cowbridge Mill, on the site of Cowbridge House.

To the south, the parish extends some 4 miles (6.4 km) from Malmesbury, almost to Stanton St Quintin, including parts of Hullavington Airfield and the adjacent Buckley Barracks.

The Bristol Avon forms part of the north and east boundaries of the parish. Its tributary the Gauze Brook crosses the parish.

== History ==
Between the 7th and 11th centuries, the land which forms the modern parish was acquired by Malmesbury Abbey. By 1191 the parish church of the town was St Paul's, close to the abbey. After the creation of Malmesbury municipal borough in 1886, the remainder of the parish was renamed St Paul Malmesbury Without. Land from Westport, southwest of the town, was added in 1896.

== Governance ==
The parish elects a parish council. It is in the area of Wiltshire Council unitary authority, which is responsible for all significant local government functions.

== Notable buildings ==
Cole Park, a Grade II* listed country house about 1 1/2 miles (2.4 km) south of Malmesbury, stands in parkland where Malmesbury Abbey had a deer-park. Parts of the house are from the 16th century but it was much altered and extended in the 17th and 18th.

The churches at Corston (15th century, rebuilt 1881 and 1911) and Rodbourne (12th and 13th centuries) are also Grade II* listed.
