= Milbourne, Wiltshire =

Hamlet in Wiltshire, England

Coordinates: 51.588°N 2.082°W

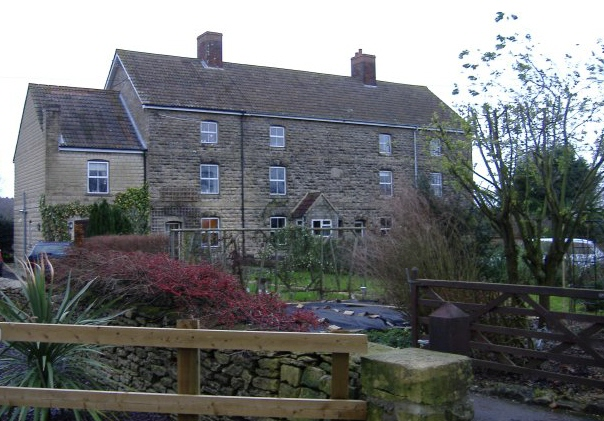
The Mill at Milbourne

Milbourne is a hamlet on the eastern edge of Malmesbury, Wiltshire, England. It is within the civil parish of St Paul Malmesbury Without.

The hamlet consists of older houses, mainly built in the 16th, 17th and 18th centuries, strung out along Milbourne Lane, as well as more modern houses at the entrance to the hamlet, at Milbourne Park and at Monks Park. The older houses tend to be set back from the road, as much of what are now front gardens were wide verges forming common grazing land prior to the Enclosures Act.

In the later 17th century the Oxford–Bristol road ran east–west through Milbourne and Malmesbury but this later became a minor road, which in 1973 was severed by the A429 Malmesbury bypass.

There are two listed buildings, both with 17th-century origins: Milbourne House and Milbourne Farmhouse.
