= Malmesbury Abbey =

Abbey and parish church in Wiltshire, England

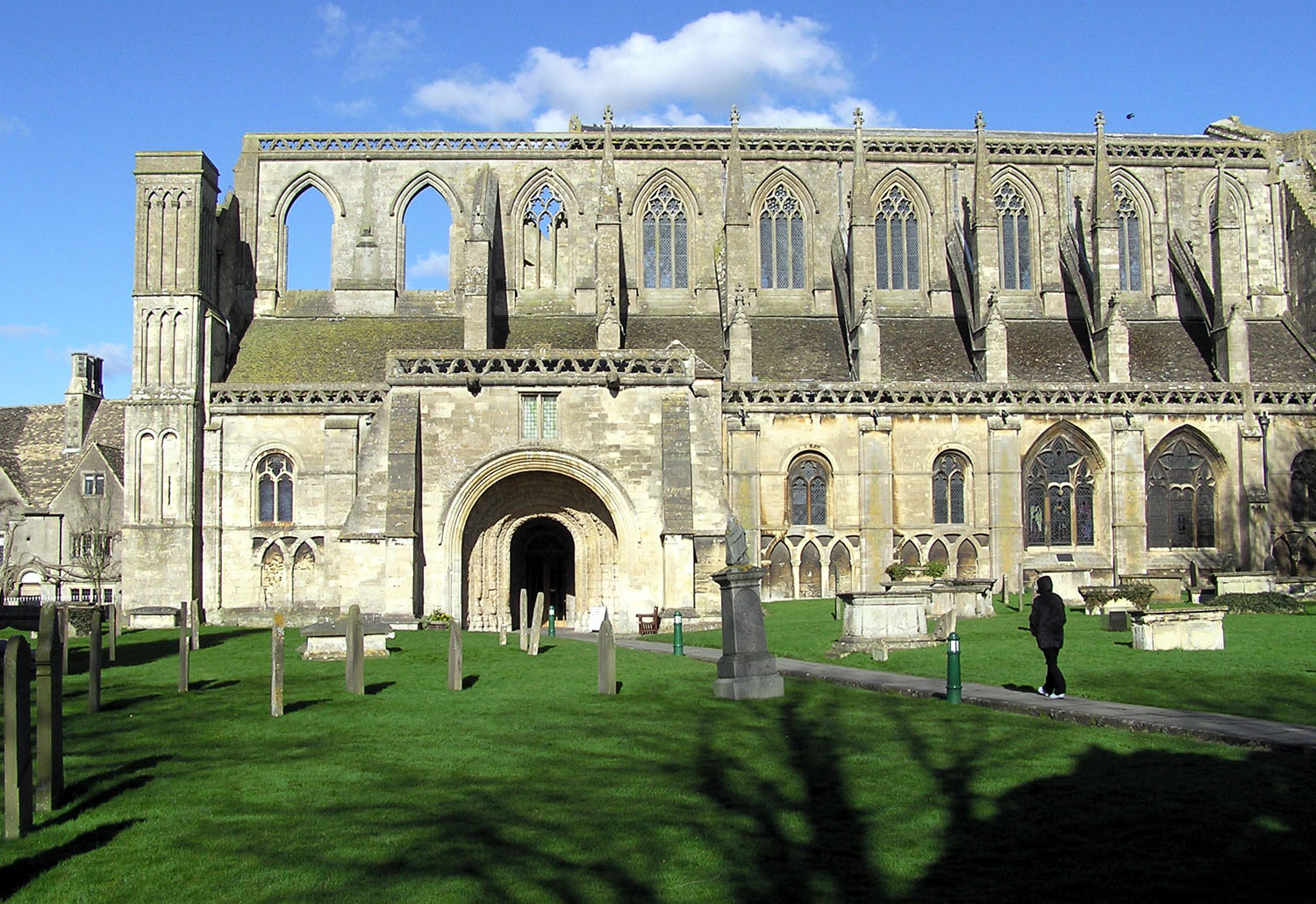
- The main entrance (the south porch) seen from the churchyard, showing the truncated extent of the Abbey at left

- Location in Wiltshire Location in England
- 51.5847°N 2.0984°W
- OS grid reference: ST 93280 87320
- Location: Malmesbury, Wiltshire
- Country: England
- Denomination: Church of England
- Previous denomination: Roman Catholic (until 1539)
- Website: malmesburyabbey.com

History
- Status: Parish church
- Founded: c. 676
- Founder: Aldhelm
- Dedication: Saint Peter and Saint Paul

Architecture
- Functional status: Active
- Heritage designation: Grade I listed
- Designated: 1949
- Architectural type: Abbey
- Groundbreaking: 7th century

Administration
- Province: Province of Canterbury
- Diocese: Diocese of Bristol
- Archdeaconry: Malmesbury
- Deanery: North Wiltshire
- Benefice: Malmesbury and Upper Avon
- Parish: Malmesbury and Brokenborough

Clergy
- Bishop: Right Rev. Vivienne Faull
- Vicar: Rev. Oliver Ross

Malmesbury Abbey, at Malmesbury in Wiltshire, England, is a former Benedictine abbey dedicated to Saint Peter and Saint Paul. It was one of the few English religious houses with a continuous history from the 7th century through to the Dissolution of the Monasteries.

== History ==
=== Monastic history ===
In the later seventh century, the site of the Abbey was chosen by Máel Dub, an Irish monk who established a hermitage, teaching local children. Towards the end of his life, in the late seventh century, the area was conquered by the Saxons. Malmesbury Abbey was founded as a Benedictine monastery around 676 by the scholar-poet Aldhelm, a nephew of King Ine of Wessex. The town of Malmesbury grew up around the expanding Abbey and under Alfred the Great was made a burh, with an assessment of 12 hides.

In October 939 Æthelstan, king of Wessex and of the English, died in Gloucester, and in the year 941 his remains were buried in the Abbey. The choice of Malmesbury over the New Minster in Winchester indicated that the king remained an outsider to the West Saxon court. A mint was founded at the Abbey around this time.

The Abbey developed an illustrious reputation for academic learning under the rule of abbots such as Aldhelm, John Scotus Eriugena, Alfred of Malmesbury and Aelfric of Eynsham.

The Abbey was the site of an early attempt at human flight when, during the early 11th century, the monk Eilmer of Malmesbury attached wings to his body and flew from a tower. Eilmer flew over 200 yards (182 m) before landing, breaking both legs. He later remarked that the only reason he did not fly further was the lack of a tail on his glider.

The Domesday Book of 1086 says of the Abbey:

In Wiltshire: Highway (11 hides), Dauntsey (10 hides), Somerford Keynes (5 hides), Brinkworth (5 hides), Norton, near Malmesbury (5 hides), Brokenborough with Corston (50 hides), Kemble (30 hides—now in Glos.), Long Newnton (30 hides), Charlton (20 hides), Garsdon (3 hides), Crudwell (40 hides), Bremhill (38 hides), Purton (35 hides); (fn. 127) in Gloucestershire: Littleton - upon - Severn (5 hides); (fn. 128) and in Warwickshire: Newbold Pacey (3 hides). These lands were valued at £188 14s. in all and were assessed as 3 knights' fees.

The 12th-century historian William of Malmesbury was a monk at the Abbey.

The current abbey church, rebuilt by the Normans was substantially completed by 1180. The south porch has very fine Romanesque sculpture. The 431 feet (131 m) tall spire, and the tower it was built upon, collapsed in a storm around 1500 destroying much of the east end of the church.

=== Abbots ===
Name	Appointment	Died	Notes
Maidulbh		673	Irish hermit and founder of Malmesbury
Aldhelm	639	709	first Old English writer in Latin, scholar and poet
Eaba ???			known only from a letter to Lullus
Ethelhard			a signatory to a charter of 749
Cuthbert			attended the council of Clofeshoh in 803
Alfred of Malmesbury		999	
Ælfric of Crediton	974	1010	known for building work and his prophecy of the Viking sacking of Malmesbury
Æthelweard			
Cineweard			
Beorhtelm			
Beorhtold			
Beorhtwold			sold off portions of the abbey lands
Eadric	c1012		
Wulfsine		1034	
Æthelweard II			
Ælfwine			almost nothing is known of him
Beorhtwold II		1053	a man of bad character who collapsed and died during a drunken orgy in the town
Beorhtric appointed	1053	1067	removed by William the Conqueror
Turold of Fécamp	1067		moved by William I to Peterborough in 1070
Warin of Lyre (Évreux)	1070	1087	spent much of his time at court, squandering the abbey's resources
Godfrey			
Eadwulf			a monk of Winchester, expelled by Roger of Salisbury
Roger of Salisbury	1118	1139	
John of Malmsbury	1139	1140	appointed by King Stephen after he took the abbey during the Anarchy
Peter Moraunt	1141	1159	obtained a bull of Pope Innocent II
Gregory	1159	1168	
Robert	1172	1176	a physician to Henry II
Osbert Foliot	1176	1182	
Nicholas			deposed for running into debt 218
Robert of Melûn	1189	1206	
Walter Loring	1206	1222	signed Magna Carta, received papal bull from Innocent III and gained permission from King John to demolish Malmesbury Castle.
John Walsh	1222	1246	
Geoffrey, sacristan	1246	1260	a monk of Malmesbury
William of Colerne	1260	1296	
William of Badminton		1296	
Adam de la Hoke			a monk of Malmesbury
Adam by John of Tintern		1349	
Simon de Aumeney	1348	1361	
Walter de Camme	1362	1396	
Thomas Chelworth	1396	1424	
Roger Pershore	1424	1434	
John Bristow	1434	1456	
John Andever	1456	1462	
John Ayly	1462	1480	
Richard Frampton	1480	1515	
Richard Camme	1515	1533	
Richard Selwyn			surrendered the Abbey to Henry VIII in 1539

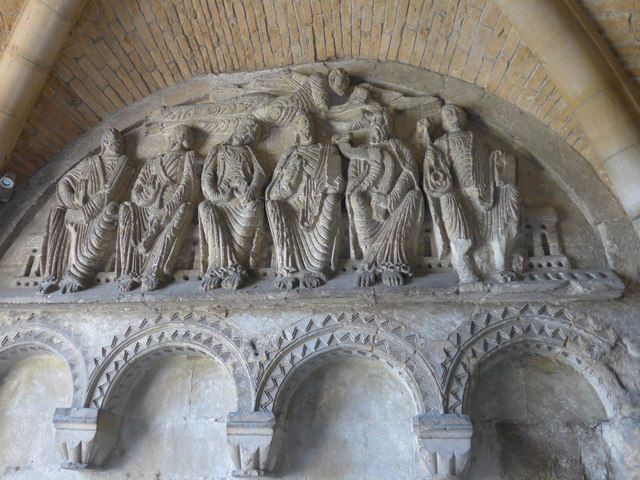
Sculpture in the south porch

=== Parish church ===
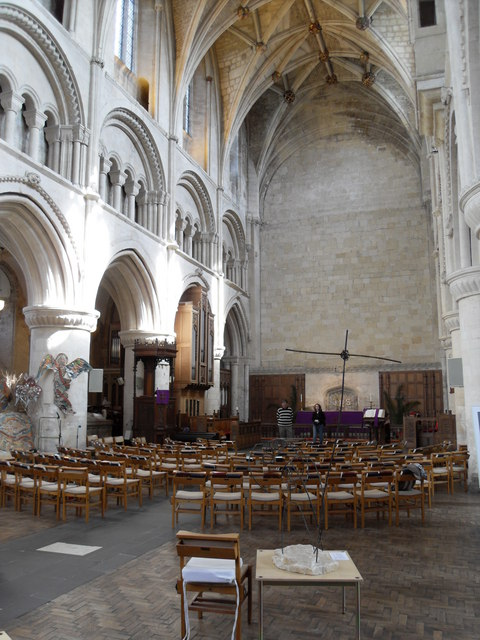
The remaining part of the nave of Malmesbury Abbey, blocked off to the west, currently used as the parish church

The abbey, which owned 23,000 acres (93 km^{2}) in the twenty parishes that constituted the Malmesbury Hundred, was closed at the Dissolution of the Monasteries in 1539 by Henry VIII and was sold, with all its lands, to William Stumpe, a rich merchant. He returned the abbey church to the town for continuing use as a parish church, and filled the abbey buildings with up to 20 looms for his cloth-weaving enterprise.

From 1301 until the mid-16th century, the parish church of Malmesbury was St. Paul's. This stood in what is now Birdcage Walk (its tower and steeple remains, and is now the Abbey belltower). In August 1541 Thomas Cranmer licensed the abbey church to replace St Paul's as the parish church of Malmesbury.

The west tower fell around 1550, demolishing the three westernmost bays of the nave. As a result of these two collapses, less than half of the original building stands today. During the English Civil War, Malmesbury suffered extensive damage evidenced by hundreds of pock-marks left by bullets and shot which can still be seen on the south, west and east sides of the building.

In 1837 the ancient chapelries of Corston and Rodbourne were made into a separate parish, called St Paul Malmesbury Without, and St Mary Westport was united to the abbey church.

In 1949, the church was designated as a Grade I listed building. Historic England added it to the Heritage at Risk Register in 2022, stating that the roofs of the nave and aisles were leaking and in need of repair.

Today Malmesbury Abbey is in full use as the parish church of Malmesbury, in the Diocese of Bristol. The remains still contain a fine parvise (a room over the porch) which holds some examples of books from the abbey library. The Anglo-Saxon charters of Malmesbury, though extended by forgeries and improvements executed in the abbey's scriptorium, provide source material today for the history of Wessex and the West Saxon church from the seventh century.

== Vicars of St Paul's and the Abbey Church, Malmesbury ==
- 1301 Reginald de Souple
- 1312 Roger Snell to Alynton
- 1332 Walter Drueys
- 1336 John de Ashebi
- 1348 Stephen de Tettebury
- 1353 Walter le Walker
- 1369 Richard de Lokenham
- 1379 John Oseborn
- 1387 Thomas Wibbe
- 1394 John Comeleygh
- 1428 William Butte
- 1439 Hugh Thomas
- 1462 William Sherewode
- 1497 Richard Chaunceller
- 1503 Thomas Long
- 1519 William Barlow
- 1535 Richard Turner
- 1544 John Aprice
- 1564 John Skinner
- 1565 James Procter
- 1566 Thomas Trinder
- 1567 John Sarney
- 1611 Matthew Watts
- 1616 Anthony Watson
- 1618 William Noble
- 1633 William Latimer
- 1649 Robert Harpur
- 1659 Simon Gawer
- 1664 John Hodges
- 1667 Nicholas Adee
- 1669 John Clarke
- 1676 John Binion
- 1701 Christopher Hanley
- 1705 Thomas Earle
- 1749 John Copson
- 1786 Henry Strong
- 1793 George Bisset
- 1829 Charles Pitt
- 1874 George Windsor Tucker
- 1920 Charles Paterson
- 1925 James Deade
- 1944 Arthur Beaghen
- 1975 Peter Barton
- 1994 David Littlefair
- 2004 Neill Archer
- 2018 Oliver Ross

== Organ ==
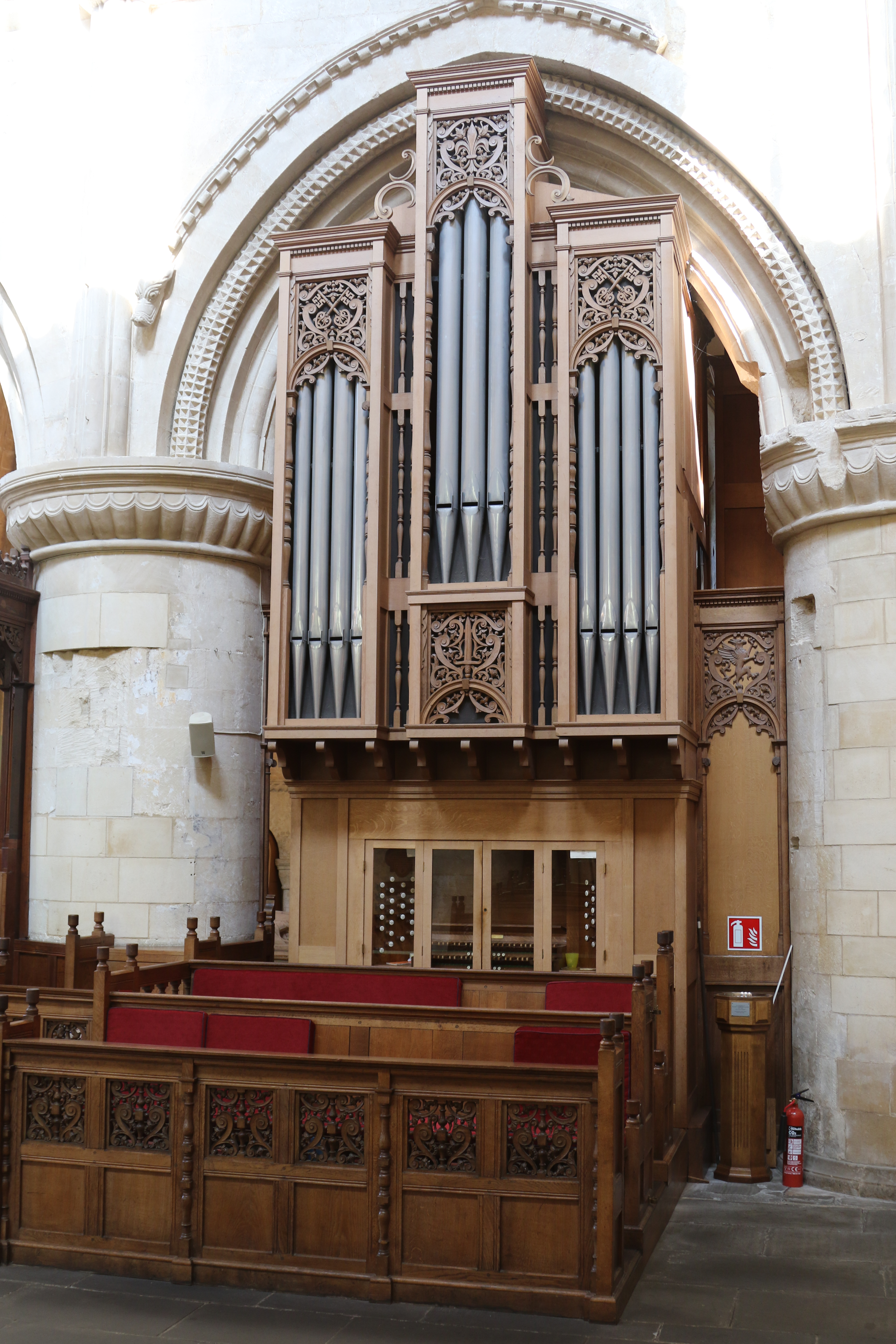
The current organ, dating from 1984

The earliest organ was obtained in 1846 and had formerly stood in the church of St Benet Fink, Threadneedle Street, London; it had been manufactured in 1714 by Abraham Jordan. In 1938 a new organ was provided by Henry Willis, which had formerly been owned by Sir George Alfred Wills, Baronet of Bristol. Eventually it too was replaced.

The current organ dates from 1984 and was built by E.J. Johnson of Cambridge at a cost of £71,000 (equivalent to £231,249 in 2025). A specification of the organ can be found on the National Pipe Organ Register.

== Notable burials ==
An early 20th-century engraving of King Æthelstan's tomb

- Máel Dub, who founded the first monastic community in Malmesbury and gave his name to the town. His bones were cast out of the church of St. Peter and St. Paul by the Norman abbot Warin of Lyre, and relegated to a far corner of St. Michael's Church.
- Aldhelm, first Bishop of Sherborne and saint
- Æthelwine and Ælfwine, sons of Æthelweard (son of Alfred)
- Æthelstan, regarded as the first king of England. He was buried in the tower, under the altar of St. Mary. According to William of Malmesbury, Æthelstan's body was disinterred in the 11th century and reburied in the abbot's garden (now Abbey House Gardens) to avoid Norman desecration. He is commemorated by an empty 15th-century tomb in the north aisle.
- Daniel, Bishop of Winchester
- Hannah Twynnoy, supposedly the first person to be killed by a tiger in England, is buried in the churchyard, her gravestone inscribed with a poem. She was killed on 23 October 1703 after teasing a tiger in a menagerie stabled in the White Lion public house where she worked.

== Legacy ==
In 2009, historian Michael Wood speculated that Malmesbury Abbey was the site of transcription of the Anglo-Saxon epic poem Beowulf.

== See also ==
- List of English abbeys, priories and friaries serving as parish churches
- Monk of Malmesbury
- The Old Bell, Malmesbury

== Images ==
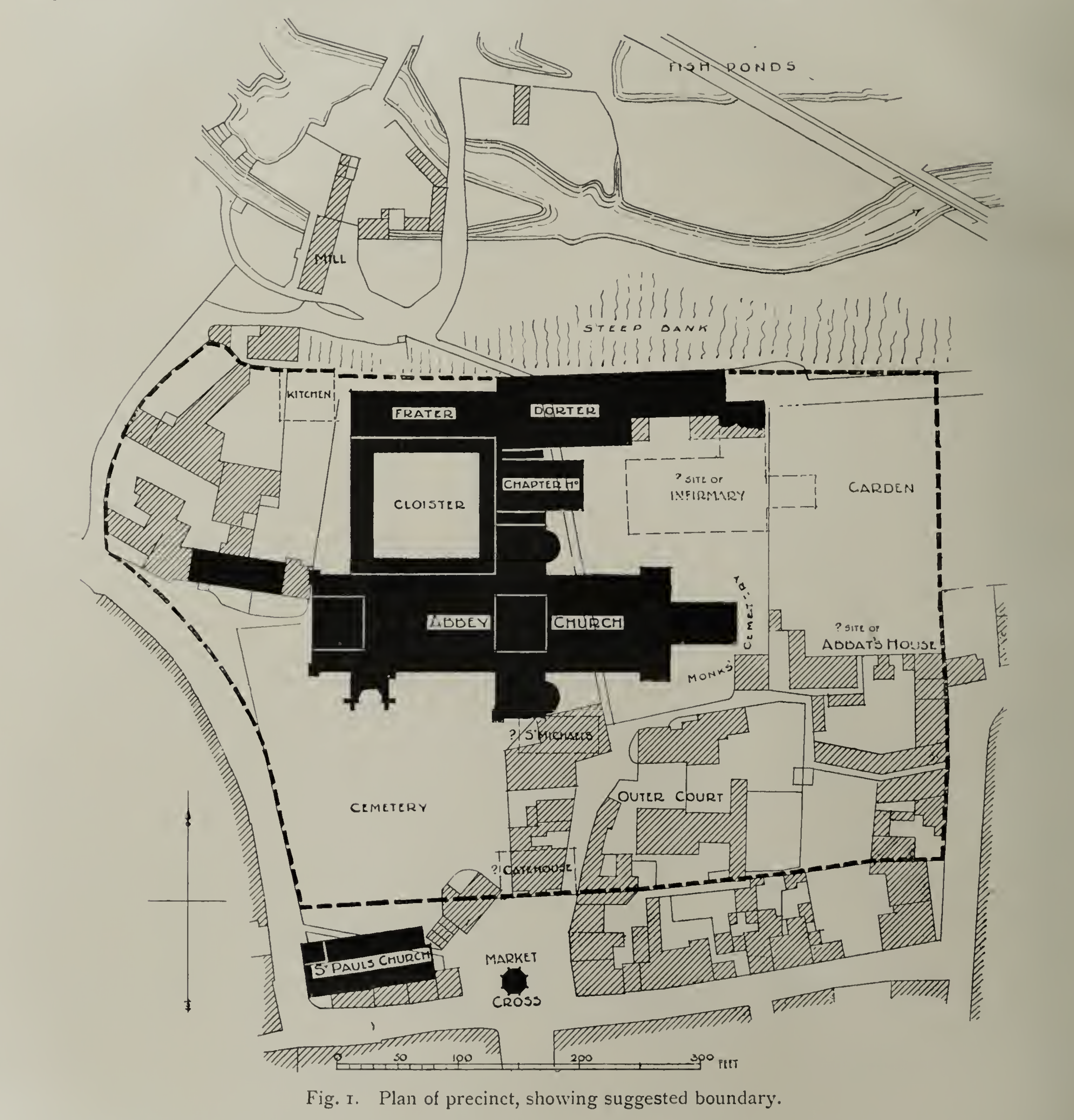
The abbey precinct

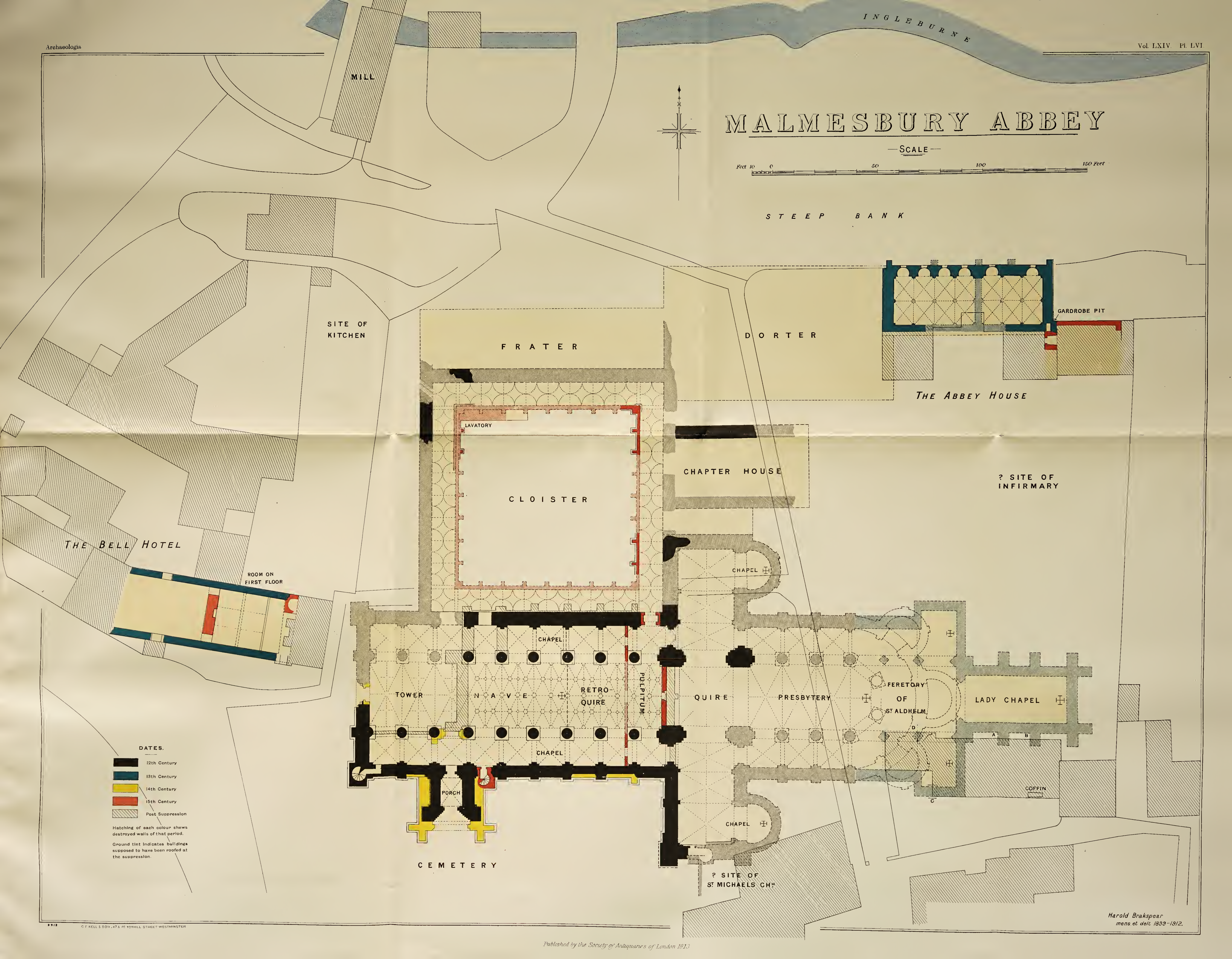
Ground plan of the abbey

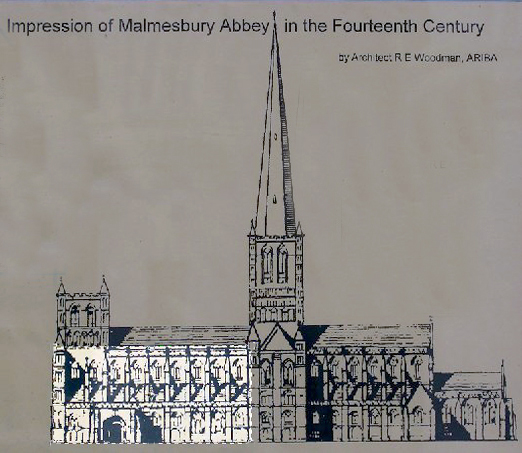
The Abbey in the 14th century: only the brightened area is now used, following collapses of the spire and west tower

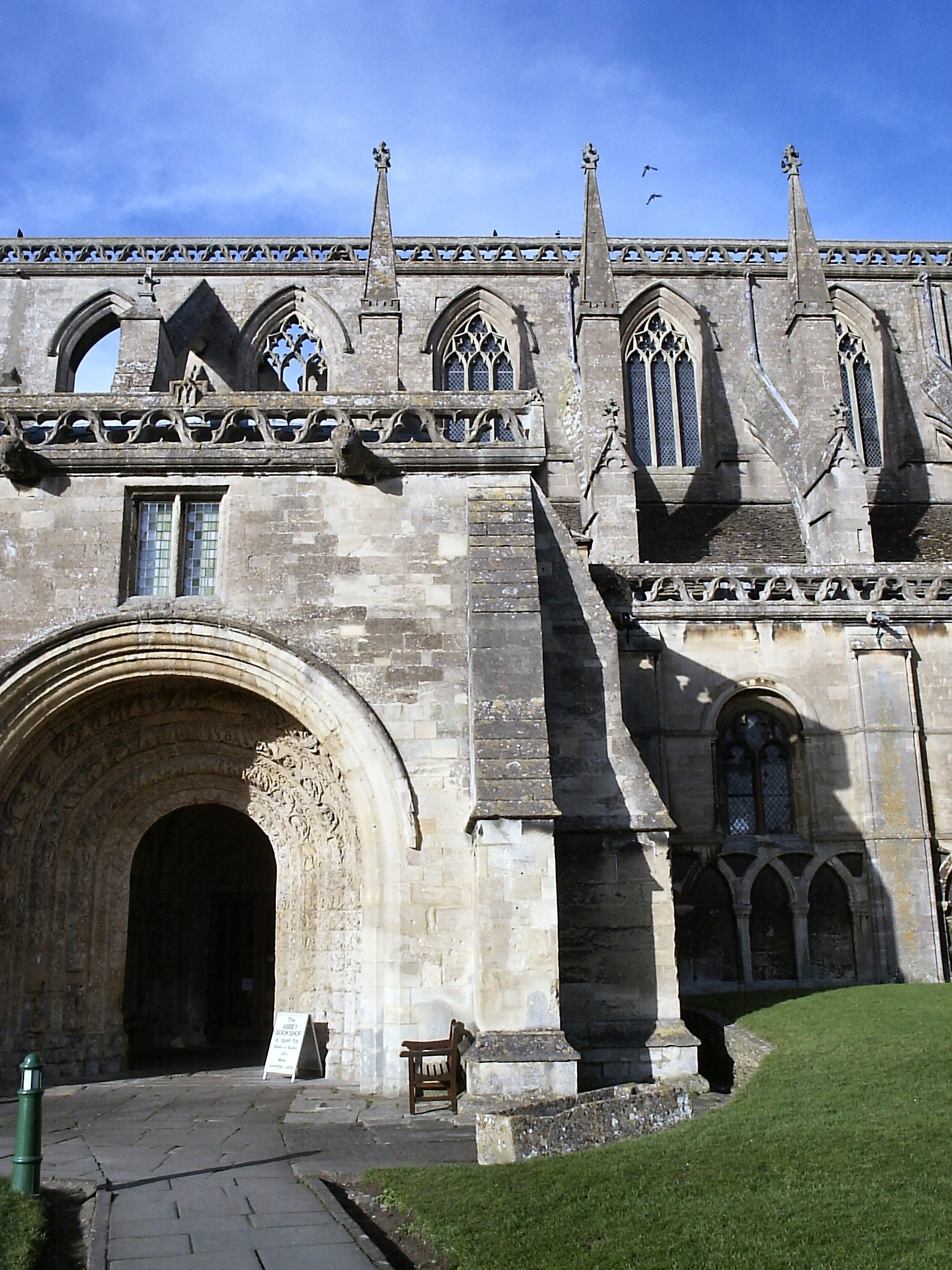
The fine parvise over the south porch

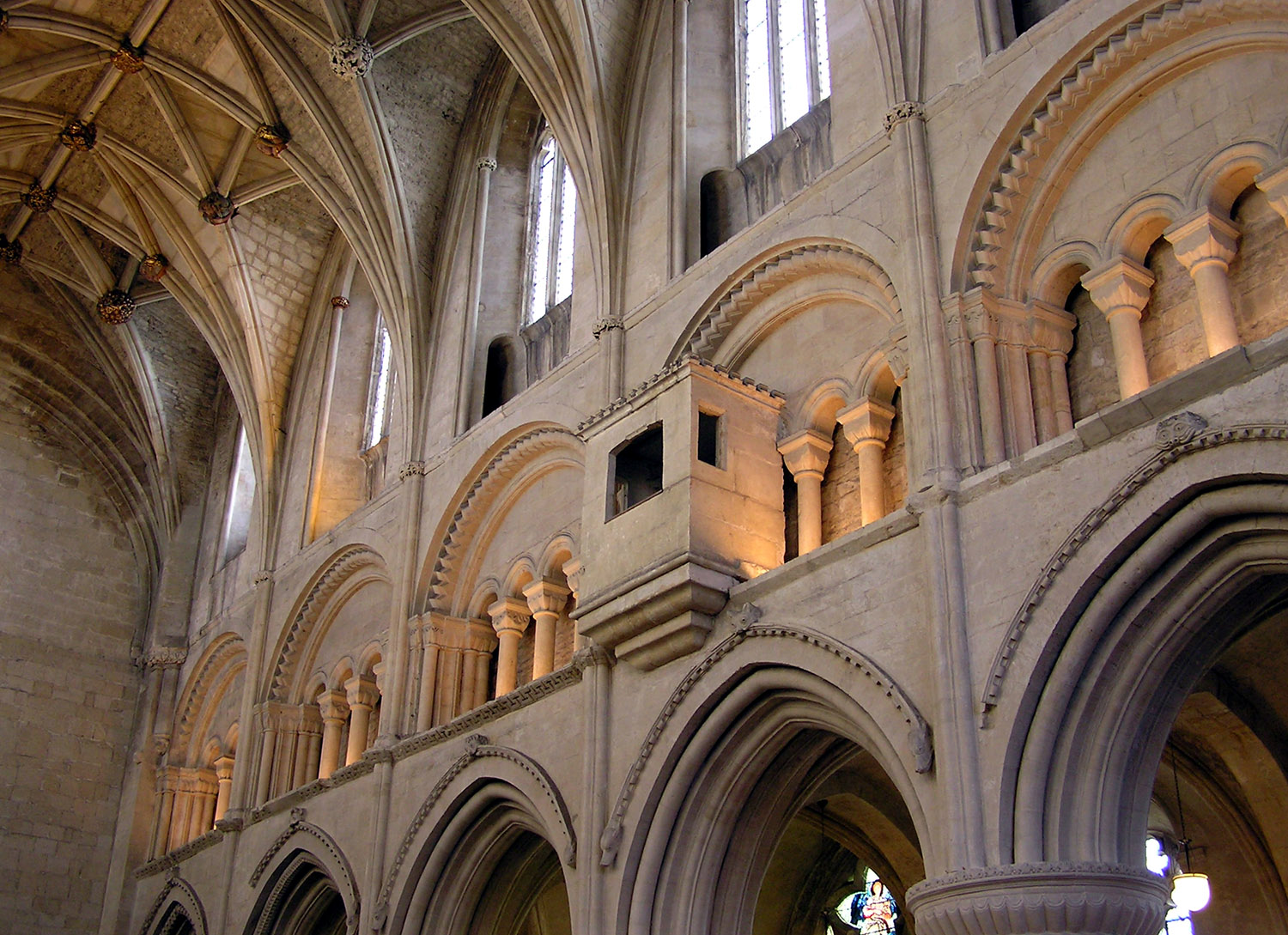
Interior of the Abbey, showing the unusual watching-loft projecting above the nave

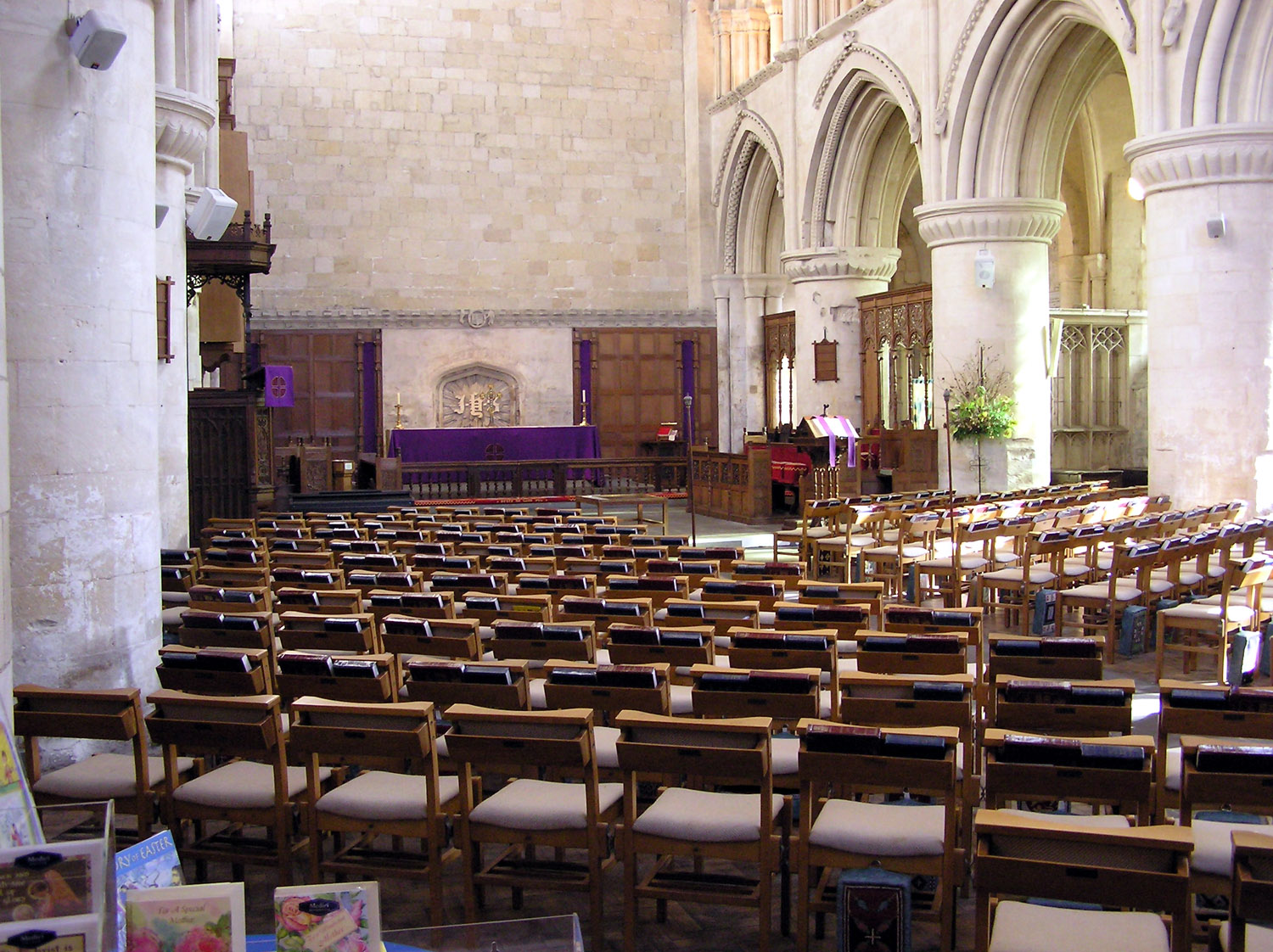
The Abbey interior; the ruined area lies beyond the blank wall rising above the altar

== Sources ==
- Brakspear, Harold (1913). "Malmesbury Abbey". Archaeologia. 64: 399–436. doi:10.1017/S026134090001078X.
- Kelly, Susan E., ed. (2005). Charters of Malmesbury Abbey. Oxford University Press. ISBN 978-0-19-726317-4.
- Smith, M Q: The Sculptures of the South Porch of Malmesbury Abbey: A Short Guide, 1975
- William of Malmesbury (1125). Gesta Pontificum Anglorum (The History of the English Bishops) – Vol. I: Text and Translation. Oxford: Clarendon Press. ISBN 978-0-19-820770-2.

Records
Preceded by Lighthouse of Alexandria	World's tallest tower 1180–1221	Succeeded by Old St Paul's Cathedral
