= The Old Bell, Malmesbury =

Grade I listed hotel in Wiltshire, England

The Old Bell

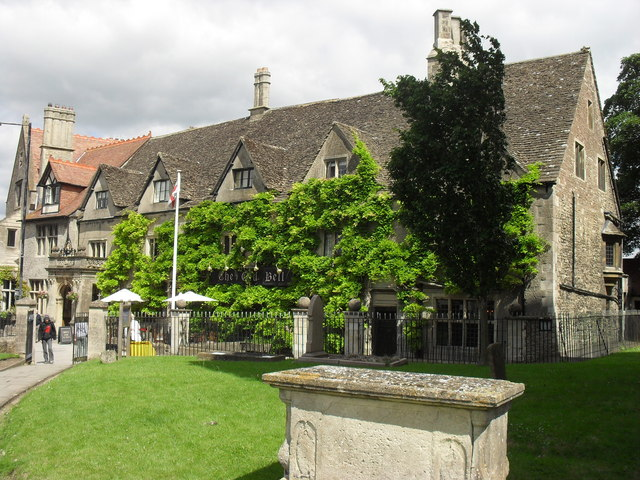

- Location in Wiltshire

General information
- Location: Malmesbury, Wiltshire, England
- Coordinates: 51°35′5″N 2°5′56″W
- Opened: 1220
- Owner: Kim and Whit Hanks

Other information
- Number of rooms: 33
- Number of suites: 8
- Number of restaurants: 1

Website
- www.oldbellhotel.co.uk

The Old Bell is a hotel and restaurant in the Cotswold market town of Malmesbury in Wiltshire, England. The hotel is in the centre of the town, immediately next to the 12th-century remains of Malmesbury Abbey. The Old Bell is a Grade I listed building because of its architectural and historic significance. Substantial parts of the fabric of the hotel date back to the 13th century, when it was the guest house of the Abbey. It has a claim to be considered as the oldest hotel in England. It was built in about 1220 on the site of Malmesbury Castle, which was obtained by the monks and demolished in 1216.

== Malmesbury Castle ==
The Old Bell was not the original name of the hotel – until 1798 it was known as The Castle Inn. It was thought, almost certainly correctly, to be built on the site of Malmesbury Castle. In the 1120s Bishop Roger of Salisbury was given control over Malmesbury – both the monastery and the town – and built a castle next to the Abbey, much to the annoyance of the monks. Roger was a powerful man because he was the chief minister of King Henry I.

The castle had a relatively short life but witnessed some dramatic events. It was of strategic importance during the so-called Anarchy (1139–1153), a civil war between King Stephen and his cousin, the Empress Matilda. The castle was important to Stephen because it gave him a base in a part of England that was largely sympathetic to Matilda. In 1139 King Stephen came in person to Malmesbury in order to besiege and retake the castle which had been seized by Flemish freelance mercenaries. In 1144 forces loyal to the Empress Matilda besieged the castle and again Stephen brought an army to help his garrison. He successfully ended the siege and retained control of the castle. In January 1153 the son of the Empress Matilda, Henry Plantagenet, invaded England intending to seize the crown. His first act was to march to Malmesbury and besiege the castle. During the siege his men carried out a massacre of townsfolk and monks in the Abbey church. Stephen responded by bringing an army to Malmesbury to support the castle garrison. After some inconclusive skirmishing Stephen retreated and Henry proceeded to take control of the castle. The events at Malmesbury were a turning point in the struggle for the crown of England. Following Henry's success many barons changed sides and a few months later Stephen admitted defeat and recognised Henry as his heir. In 1154 Henry Plantagenet was crowned as King Henry II.

The monks always resented the presence of a castle which was, according to the historian William of Malmesbury, "just a stone's throw" from the Abbey church. In 1216 King John, the son of Henry II, was desperate for money because he was fighting a war against both baronial opponents and an invading French army. He had been a frequent visitor to the castle but he agreed to sell the site to Abbot Walter Loring who immediately demolished the castle.

== The oldest hotel in England? ==
Scholars consider that the function of the building erected by Abbot Walter in about 1220 was as the guest house. The Historic England official 'listing' of the hotel as a Grade I building, for example, describes the hotel as having been originally the 'Abbey Guest House'.

After the Dissolution of the Abbey in 1539 and the departure of the monks the building became an inn offering accommodation to travellers on the road from Bristol to Oxford. The claim that the Old Bell is the oldest hotel in England is based, therefore, on the strong possibility that there was more or less continuous use of the building as a place of hospitality from about 1220 to the present day.

In the Middle Ages there were frequent royal visitors to Malmesbury. After the demolition of the castle the kings and queens of England, and their senior courtiers, lodged in the Abbey guest house, in what is now the Old Bell.

Some royal itineraries survive and enable us to work out some of the kings and queens who were guests during the medieval centuries. We know, for example, that Henry III stayed at the Abbey in 1222, 1235 and 1241. Edward I was a guest on the night of 23 March 1282. On 8–10 October 1328 the Abbey accommodated the boy king Edward III and his mother, Queen Isabella, and her lover, Roger Mortimer, soon after Isabella and Mortimer had deposed and killed Edward II, the father of Edward III. King Edward IV was in Malmesbury on 30 April to 1 May 1471, on his way to the Battle of Tewkesbury (4 May 1471), one of the key battles of the so-called Wars of the Roses.

== Civil War ==
Malmesbury was of strategic importance during the early stages of the Civil War between parliamentary and royalist forces in the 1640s. it was twice taken by storm by parliamentary soldiers and on both occasions the two sides clashed with artillery and muskets immediately outside the Old Bell. The musket fire and artillery did considerable damage to the west front of the Abbey, next to the Bell. Many impact marks resulting from the fighting can still be seen on the masonry of the Abbey.

A parliamentary force commanded by Sir William Waller attacked the town on 21 March 1644. Waller's men attempted to take the town by marching up Abbey Row, the road on which the Old Bell stands. The royalist garrison fought back and there was two days of fighting in the immediate area of the hotel before the royalists surrendered on the morning of 22 March.

The royalists re-took Malmesbury, without a fight, later in 1643. Another parliamentary army, commanded by Colonel Edward Massey besieged the town in May 1644. Massey's tactics were almost identical to those of Waller. On the morning of 25 May a troop of musketeers marched up Abbey Row and overran the royalist troops who were positioned close to the Old Bell. After this the town remained under the control of the army of the parliament for the rest of the war.

== Architecture ==
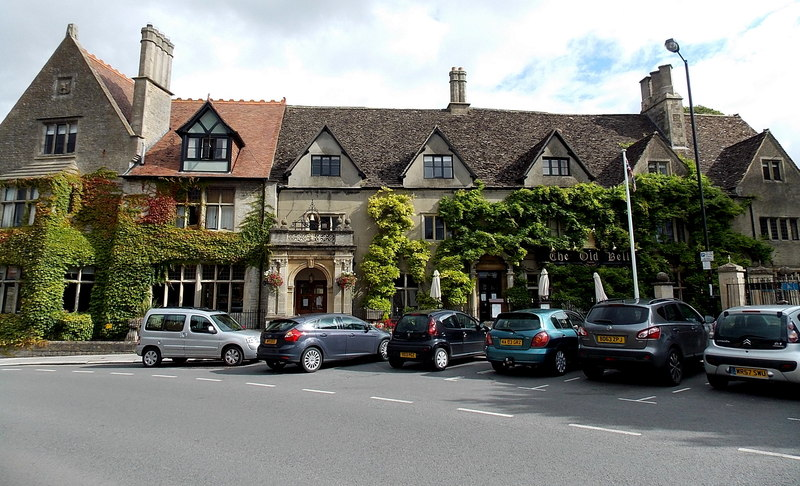
Front view of the hotel

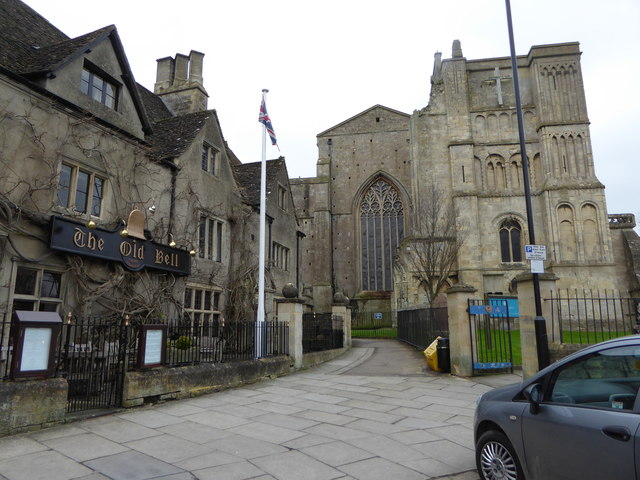
Malmesbury Abbey is to the right of the hotel

=== Exterior ===
The inn has been extended and altered over many centuries from a core built in 1220 for visitors to the Abbey, re-using material from the castle keep built by Bishop Roger in c.1130, which had been demolished in 1216 by permission of King John. The abbey guest house was extended at the east end in the late 15th or early 16th century and the older structure partly refaced and re-roofed. Following the dissolution of the monasteries, the house was referred to as the Steward's Lodging and was used for some time as weavers' lodgings: "every corner of the vast houses of office which belonged to the abbaye", Leland noted in 1540, "be fulle of lumbes to weve clothe yn" The present roofline and dormers date to the 17th century, and the west extension was added in 1908.

The Old Bell was listed as a Grade I listed building on 28 January 1949. The four-bay inn is built in limestone rubble with limestone dressings. Mullion windows are a feature and the front is heavily covered in vegetation. The inn has a central cross-axial stack, with a 16th-century two-bay extension and two large gable dormers on the east side.

In the early 16th century, an additional property was attached to the eastern end of the guest house. From this point until the early 20th century the Old Bell site comprised two distinct properties: the guest house and later inn occupying the western section and a separate property, later known as Castle House, close to the Abbey. When looking at the Old Bell from Abbey Row it is easy to see the distinct nature of Castle House which still has its own front door set within a fine 18th-century 'shell' porch.

The hotel was remodelled in the early 20th century. In 1908 an extension was built to the east of the medieval guest house block. Today this Edwardian period extension provides the reception and the main restaurant for the hotel. At about the same time that the extension was built the Castle House ceased to be used as a separate dwelling and was integrated into the hotel building.

=== Interior ===
A prominent feature of the inn is an ashlar fire hood which is believed to be one of the earliest domestic-style ground-floor fireplaces, served by a flue, in England; it is dated to the initial building in 1220. It was restored around 1980. The fireplace is important in the history of architecture in England. In the early Middle Ages fires simply burnt in a central hearth. By about 1200 wall fireplaces with integrated flues built into the structure of the walls began to appear in English castles. The fireplace in the Old Bell uses this flue technology pioneered in castles and may well be one of the earliest surviving examples in England of a flue fireplace outside the context of a castle, preceded by a similar example at Boothby Pagnell Manor House, circa 1200.

The central room to the first floor has a late 15th-century and early 16th-century compartmental ceiling with deeply moulded beams, and 17th-century dormers are cut through large trenched purlins. The current stairway is relatively new, replaced some time after 1950. A corridor connects the main building to the coaching house, which has six rooms on the ground floor, and several of the rooms are adjoining. Beneath the lounge to the inn is a vaulted cellar which has been reported to contain eight stone coffins. The dwarf walls with iron railings attached to the property are also part of the Listed Building designation.

== Some notable owners ==
After the Dissolution of the Abbey, the inn became part of a property portfolio known as Malmesbury Manor. The Lord of the Manor of Malmesbury owned the inn. The Danvers family bought the Manor, including the inn, in 1631. From 1644 the owner was Sir John Danvers. He was an MP for Malmesbury and a keen supporter of Oliver Cromwell. In 1649 Danvers was one of the men who signed the Death Warrant of King Charles I.

The property was inherited from the Danvers family by Lord Thomas Wharton in 1682. Wharton was one of the leading politicians of the age and he played a key role in the planning of the Glorious Revolution of 1688. Wharton was notoriously corrupt. He used his influence in Malmesbury to turn the town into a 'rotten borough', ensuring that elections to Parliament were entirely determined by bribery. Malmesbury remained a rotten borough until 1832. Thomas Wharton's son, Philip Wharton, was even more notorious than his father. He lived a decadent lifestyle. He founded the original Hellfire Club in London and at club meetings Wharton and his friends indulged in heavy drinking and ceremonies mocking Christian beliefs. Wharton left England and, in his absence was found guilty of treason because of his political beliefs.

Between 1748 and 1896 the Old Bell, and the adjacent Castle House, were owned by the more respectable Rushout family, who leased out the two properties on long leasehold contracts. In 1896 the last owner of Malmesbury Manor, Lady Elizabeth Rushout, broke up the family estate and sold the freehold of the Bell Inn to Joseph Moore, who was the landlord and leaseholder of the inn. Soon afterwards, Moore also bought the freehold of Castle House and began the process of integrating the two properties into one hotel building. He renamed the refurbished hotel The Old Bell. A stone inscribed 'JM 1908' can still be seen on the hotel chimney at the east end of the building.

== The hotel today ==
The Old Bell was purchased by Kim and Whit Hanks on 31 March 2021. The Hanks were regular visitors to the Malmesbury area before the purchase because Whit's family history research identified the town as the ancestral home of his paternal family. A pioneering Malmesbury industrialist, Walter Hanks, operated a mill below The Old Bell on the River Avon in the late 1100s. Having bought the hotel, the new owners discovered that members of the Malmesbury Hanks family owned the leasehold on part of the building in the 1860s and 1870s. In 2021, following the acquisition, the ground floor of the hotel was refurbished. As of 2021, the hotel has a four-star rating and the restaurant has one AA rosette.

== See also ==
- Abbey House Gardens
- The Olde Bell, Hurley
