= Corston, Wiltshire =

Village in Wiltshire, England

Coordinates: 51.554°N 2.110°W

Corston
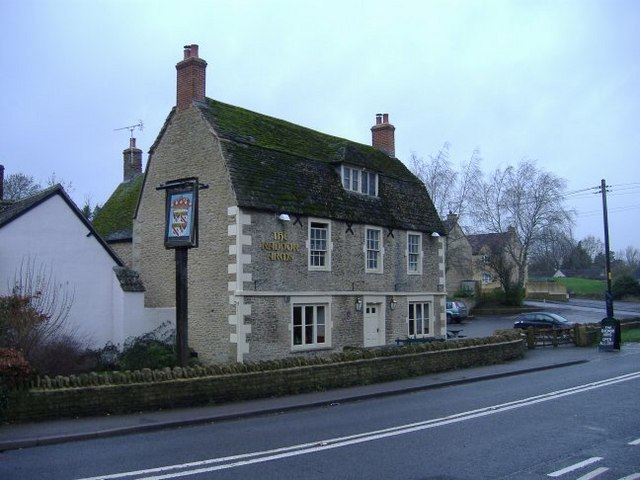
- The Radnor Arms

- Location within Wiltshire
- OS grid reference: ST925839
- Civil parish: St Paul Malmesbury Without
- Unitary authority: Wiltshire
- Ceremonial county: Wiltshire
- Region: South West
- Country: England
- Sovereign state: United Kingdom
- Post town: Malmesbury
- Postcode district: SN16
- Dialling code: 01666
- Police: Wiltshire
- Fire: Dorset and Wiltshire
- Ambulance: South Western
- UK Parliament: South Cotswolds

Corston is a small village on the A429 road in Wiltshire, England, in the civil parish of St Paul Malmesbury Without, approximately 3 miles (4.8 km) south of the town of Malmesbury. The Gauze Brook, a tributary of the Bristol Avon, passes through the village.

The Fry chocolate family trace their roots to Corston.

== History ==
In the Domesday survey in 1086, Corstone was recorded as part of the Brokenborough estate held by Malmesbury Abbey, and there were approximately 54 households. Corston became a tithing of Malmesbury parish, its boundaries little changed since around 1100.

The abbey's lands passed to the Crown at the Dissolution and in 1573 the estate was bought by Sir Walter Hungerford. In 1685 it passed from the Hungerfords to Robert Sutton, 2nd Baron Lexinton and later to the Earls of Radnor. The 6th Earl sold off several farms in the early 20th century.

Malmesbury municipal borough was created in 1886, and in 1894 the remainder of Malmesbury parish, including Corston, was renamed St Paul Malmesbury Without.

The population peaked in the mid-19th century, with 322 recorded at the 1851 census; numbers increased again in the later 20th century, partly through building of married quarters for RAF Hullavington.

== Church ==
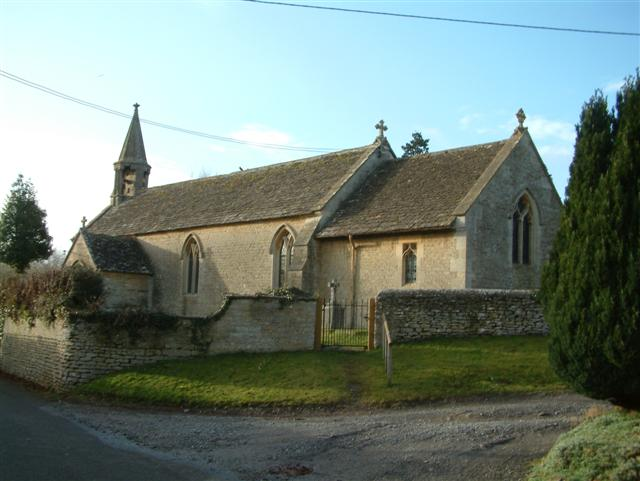
All Saints Church

The Church of England church is dedicated to All Saints and is Grade II* listed.

There may have been a church on this site in the 12th century. The present building has a 15th-century bell-turret with a short spire – described by Pevsner as "impressive" – but the rest was rebuilt in 1881 in coursed rubble with stone dressings; the chancel is from 1911. Inside is a 15th-century rood screen and a 17th-century oak pulpit.

Anciently a chapelry of St Paul's at Malmesbury, in 1881 a vicar was appointed to the district chapelry of Corston with Rodbourne, with Corston as the primary church of the district. In 1951 the benefice was held in plurality with that of Foxley with Bremilham, and in 1986 was united with Great Somerford, Little Somerford and Seagry. Today the church is part of the Malmesbury and Upper Avon group.

== Transport ==
The village is served by the Coachstyle 99 bus route, which runs once an hour between Chippenham, Malmesbury and Swindon. There is no bus service on Sundays.

The nearest railway stations are Chippenham on the Great Western Main Line, and Kemble on the Golden Valley Line, between London and Bristol and Cheltenham respectively.
