= Monk of Malmesbury =

English chronicler

A Monk of Malmesbury is the supposed author of a chronicle among the Cottonian manuscripts in the British Museum.

The authorship is uncertain, and the work in question is said by some to be only a copy of a chronicle written by Alfred of Beverley in the twelfth century, while others claim it is almost entirely based on that of Geoffrey of Monmouth. It is a very valuable compilation, describing English history from the invasion of the Saxons to the year 1129.

Because the manuscript bears the name Godridus de Malmesburg, it was originally believed that it was written by Godfrey of Malmesburg, a native of Jumièges, who became Abbot of Malmesbury in 1081. Godfrey was regarded as a man of literary tastes because he founded the abbey's library, but his authorship of the manuscript was disproved by the fact that his death took place in or before 1107, when Edulf became the abbot. Indeed, it is likely that the signature merely indicates ownership.
