= Máel Dub =

Irish monk (died 675)

Monk
- Died: 675
- Venerated in: Catholic Church
- Major shrine: Malmesbury Abbey (destroyed)

Máel Dub (the Gaelic name Máel meaning "disciple" and Dub being a byname, "dark"; Latinized as Maildubus, anglicized as Maildulf and other variants) was a Saint and reputed Irish monk of the 7th century, said to have founded a monastic house at Malmesbury, England.

It was implied by Bede that the monastery was said to have been named after him (HE 5.18, the monastery "which they call the monastery of Máel Dub" [quod Maildubi Urbem nuncupant]). There is evidence from a later charter that his name was Máel Duin.

Among his pupils were Aldhelm, the founder of Malmesbury Abbey, and Daniel of Winchester.

He died in around 675 and was buried in the church of St. Peter and St. Paul, Malmesbury. His bones were cast out in the 11th century by the Norman abbot Warin of Lyre and relegated to a far corner of St. Michael's Church.
