= Alfred of Malmesbury =

Alfred (or Aelfric) (died 999), abbot of Malmesbury, England, and afterwards (c. 990) Bishop of Crediton, was a writer of some celebrity in the tenth century.
