= Basil Reed =

English cricketer and Royal Navy officer

Personal information
- Full name: Basil Duck Reed
- Born: 8 November 1895; Malmesbury, Wiltshire, England
- Died: 12 October 1968 (aged 72); Wroughton, Wiltshire, England
- Batting: Right-handed
- Bowling: Right-arm medium

Domestic team information
- Years: Team
- 1921–1923: Wiltshire

Career statistics
Competition	First-class
Matches	1
Runs scored	8
Batting average	8.00
100s/50s	–/–
Top score	8*
Balls bowled	96
Wickets	1
Bowling average	83.00
5 wickets in innings	–
10 wickets in match	–
Best bowling	1/56
Catches/stumpings	1/–
- Source: Cricinfo, 28 June 2019

Basil Duck Reed (8 November 1895 – 12 October 1968) was an English first-class cricketer and Royal Navy officer.

Reed was born in November 1895 at Malmesbury, Wiltshire. He began serving in the Royal Navy in July 1913 as a clerk, before becoming a paymaster. He was serving as a sub lieutenant assistant-paymaster in December 1917. He made a single appearance in first-class cricket for the Royal Navy against the British Army cricket team at Lord's in 1921. Batting twice in the match, Reed ended the Royal Navy first-innings not out on 8, while in their second-innings he was dismissed without scoring by Tom Jameson. He took a single wicket in the match, dismissing Francis Brooke in the Army's first-innings, finishing with match figures of 1 for 83. He made his debut in minor counties cricket for Wiltshire against Dorset in the 1921 Minor Counties Championship, and made three further appearances in 1923. He was promoted from the rank of lieutenant commander to paymaster commander in January 1935, retaining that rank until at least August 1939. He died in October 1968 at Wroughton, Wiltshire.
