= Johannes Nauclerus =

German historian (c. 1425 – 1510)

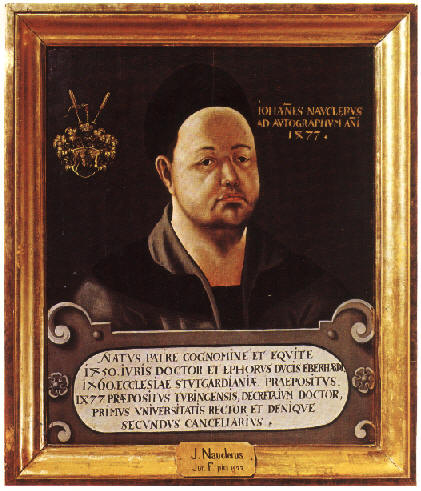
Johannes Nauclerus.

Johannes Nauclerus (Naucler, Naukler) (c. 1425 – May 1, 1510) was a 16th-century Swabian historian and humanist. He was born Johann Vergenhans to a noble (or knighted) man of the same name. As was the fashion of the time, the family's name had been Latinized, with nauclerus, meaning "skipper," being a close translation of Vergenhans, meaning "ferryman." The family's coat of arms depicted a man on a sailing ship.

Nauclerus became a doctor of law in 1450 and supervisor to Count Eberhard V of Württemberg. In 1460, he was head of the church in Stuttgart. He seems to have spent some time in Italy, and had contact with Pope Pius II. From 1464 to 1465 he taught at the University of Basel, and in 1466 he was in Rome.

In 1477 he became first rector at the University of Tübingen and subsequently its second chancellor.

In 1502, Nauclerus assumed the office of a judge of the Swabian League, which he held until his death.

== Work ==
He is the author of the World Chronicle (Memorabilium omnis aetatis et omnium gentium chronici commentarii, 1516), printed posthumously, with its foreword written by Johann Reuchlin. The work chronicled the centuries from the time of Adam to the year 1500. This work did not follow the traditional temporal divisions of "ages" (aetates) and "realms" (regna), but adhered to a division based on generations.

Written in Latin and on the suggestion of Maximilian I, Holy Roman Emperor, it described Biblical events, such as the building of the Tower of Babel, as well as events from Greek mythology, such as the Trojan War. Also included were historical events such as the burning of Girolamo Savonarola in Florence (1498).

Nauclerus consulted an unusually large number of different sources (such as an account by Eilmer of Malmesbury), indicating that he was already committed to the new spirit of humanism. Some of the sources he consulted no longer exist; their contents are only known through Nauclerus' work.

This work was known to Ortelius through Franciscus Irenicus. Erasmus also wrote a laudatory foreword.

Other works include his Tractatus de symonia perutilis (Tübingen, 1500).

== Legacy ==
- Nauklerstraße ("Naukler Street"), in Tübingen, is named after him.
