= Abbey House Gardens =

Garden at Abbey House, open to the public

Coordinates: 51°35′06″N 2°05′51″W

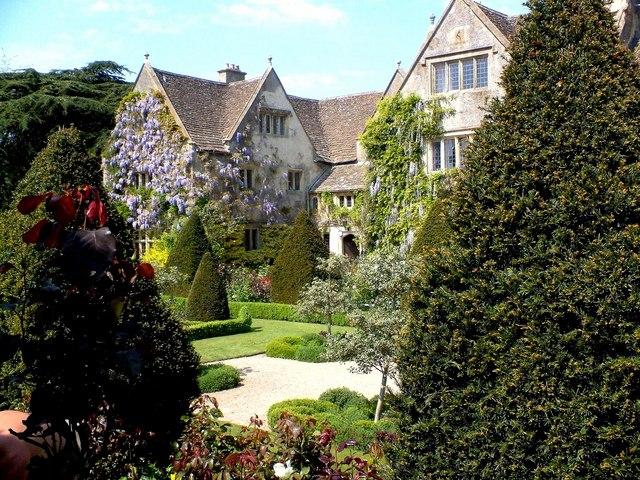
South elevation of the house, and part of the garden

Abbey House Gardens is a country house garden in Malmesbury, Wiltshire, England, covering 5 acres (2.0 ha). The garden was transformed in the 1990s by the so-called Naked Gardeners: Ian and Barbara Pollard. In 2021 the property was acquired by new American owners, Whit and Kim Hanks. They plan to convert the house into a boutique hotel, while ensuring that the gardens are regularly opened to the public. During the 2022 summer season the gardens were opened from May to October on the second Saturday of each month.

== Abbey House ==
Abbey House is a Tudor English country house built on part of the site of Malmesbury Abbey, a medieval Benedictine monastery which was dissolved in 1539. It is a Grade I listed building. The Tudor house was built on top of a substantial late 13th century undercroft which was part of the abbey buildings. The purpose of the medieval undercroft is not clear but it contains some fine Early English features. It was almost certainly built by Abbot Walter of Colerne (1260–1296) who undertook a substantial rebuilding programme at the abbey. The Tudor design of the house followed a characteristic half-H-shaped plan, with two protruding gabled bays at each end of the front elevation. To the east of the original Tudor house there is a substantial early 20th-century extension in the style of the 16th-century house. At the rear of the house, the windows of the medieval undercroft are visible on the ground floor level.

== The Stumpe family ==
Abbey House was built in the 16th century as a home for the wealthy Stumpe family. William Stumpe, the founder of the dynasty, was one of England's most successful entrepreneurs in the time of Henry VIII. He made his fortune as a producer of woollen cloth. Following the closure of Malmesbury Abbey in 1539, Stumpe purchased the site. He gave a large part of the Abbey to the town as a parish church and reserved much of the rest of the site as the setting for a family home. Although we have no documentary evidence it seems likely that Stumpe began to build Abbey House in the 1540s and the building work was continued by his son, Sir James Stumpe, who inherited his father's huge fortune in 1552. James Stumpe and his wife, Lady Isabel, lived at Abbey House until his death in 1563. Queen Elizabeth I knew the Stumpes personally and borrowed money from them; at the time of James Stumpe's death the Queen owed him £100. In the 1590s William Stumpe's grandson, John Stumpe, lived at the house with his wife, Anne. A bitter argument developed between Anne Stumpe and Lady Mary Knyvett of Charlton Park. In 1595 Anne Stumpe complained to the Star Chamber that Mary Knyvett tried to kill her by sending a gunman to shoot her at Abbey House: the gunman missed but she was traumatised by the experience.

== The manor of Malmesbury ==
By the early 1600s Abbey House was part of a large portfolio of property in the town known as the manor of Malmesbury. The lordship of the manor, and ownership of Abbey House, belonged in the early seventeenth century to the Danvers family. John Danvers, who was also the MP for Malmesbury, was a signatory to the death warrant of King Charles I. In the late 17th and early 18th century the manor was owned by Thomas Wharton and his son, Philip. They had reputations for wild living. Philip Wharton was one of the founders of the original Hellfire Club. Sir John Rushout bought the manor, including Abbey House, from the Whartons in 1743. Abbey House belonged to members of the Rushout family for 150 years until, in 1896, Lady Elizabeth Rushout broke up the manor and sold off Abbey House.

Residents in the 17th century included some remarkable people. By the time of the Civil War the tenants of Abbey House were members of the Royalist Ivie family. In 1644 the town was captured by a Parliamentarian army commanded by Nicholas Devereux, who requisitioned Abbey House. One of Devereux's senior officers, Marmaduke Pudsey, fell in love with Mary Ivie and, despite their political differences, they were married at Malmesbury Abbey on 30 September 1644. Mary's brother, Thomas Ivie was absent working for the East India Company in the 1640s and was governor of Madras, India. He returned to England and married Theodosia Garrett in 1649. She refused to move to Abbey House and wanted to live in London. They separated and she successfully sued him for maintenance payments. Ivie responded in 1654 by publishing a pamphlet denouncing his wife, titled Alimony Arraign'd. Thomas accused Theodosia of using witchcraft against him. The couple were reconciled in 1660 and Theodosia came to live at Abbey House during the 1660s. They argued again in about 1670 and Theodosia left Malmesbury for good. Thomas used his will to disinherit her.

After the death of Thomas Ivie in 1674, the lease on Abbey House transferred to his nephew, Thomas Stumpe. As a teenager he had been on an expedition with his uncle to the Amazon where he was captured by an indigenous cannibal tribe. The tribal queen took pity on him and spared his life. Thomas lived with Amazonian Indians for several years before escaping and returning to Wiltshire. The writer John Aubrey knew Stumpe and recounted his adventures in South America in his book The Natural History of Wiltshire. Thomas Stumpe lived at Abbey House for the last years of his life and died in 1698. He is commemorated by a fine monument in Malmesbury Abbey.

== 20th century ==
A wealthy young couple, Elliott and Eva Mackirdy, bought Abbey House in 1906. They decided to extend the property and rebuilt the eastern end of the building, employing the architect Harold Brakspear. The alterations were begun before the First World War and completed in the 1920s. In 1968, Eva Mackirdy sold Abbey House to a group of Anglican nuns who were members of the Community of St Andrew. They used the property as a retirement home for elderly sisters and their guests.

In 1994, Abbey House was bought by Ian and Barbara Pollard, who had previously owned Hazelbury Manor, another mansion near Box in Wiltshire.

== The Naked Gardeners ==
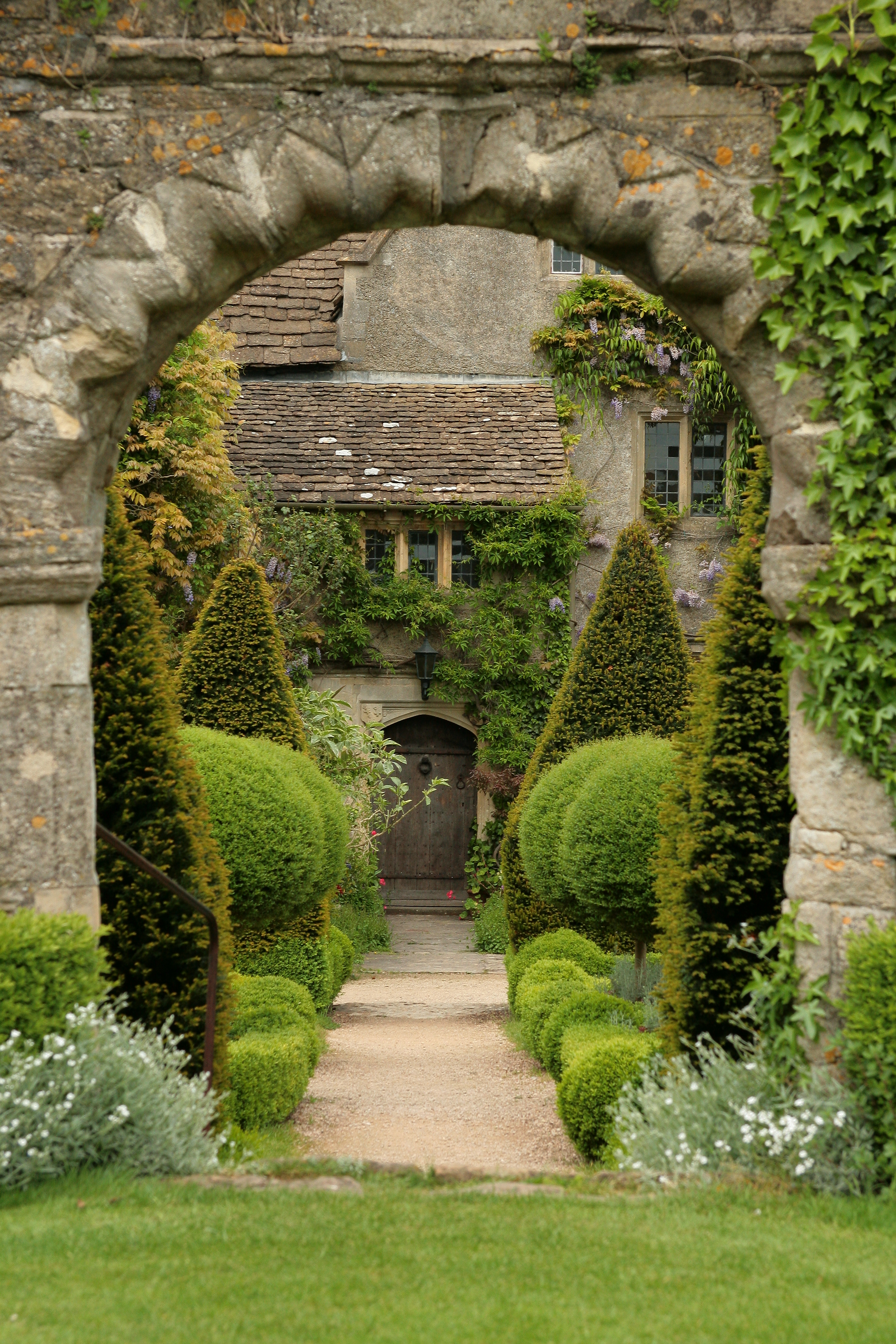
View towards the house in 2008

Ian and Barbara Pollard set about transforming the 5 acres (2.0 ha), and opened the gardens to the public in 1996. They achieved fame not only for the magnificent garden but also for their love of naturism and gardening without clothes, thus they became known as the Naked Gardeners. The garden design of Ian Pollard had two distinct parts. In the front of the house, on a flat area of two acres, he established a series of formal 'garden rooms', demarcated by box and yew hedges, with topiary, herbaceous borders and trained apples and pears. Hedges traced the outline of the abbey's Lady Chapel which extended into this part of the garden in the Middle Ages. At the back of the house Pollard created a terraced woodland garden on the steep natural hillside and a river garden, with a viewing mound, on the site of the monastic fish-ponds. Ian Pollard died in March 2019.

== The Hanks connection and Abbey House Manor ==
In November 2021 Barbara Pollard sold Abbey House to Whit and Kim Hanks, who in March of that year had bought the nearby Old Bell Hotel. The couple had been regular visitors to the area for many years because Whit's family history research identified the town as the ancestral home of his paternal family. Before the 20th century, Hanks was a common name in the town, and a Mark Pleydell Hanks was living at Abbey House in 1841. By purchasing both the Old Bell and Abbey House, Whit and Kim Hanks had brought back into single ownership the two most prominent properties that belonged to the historic manor of Malmesbury before the break-up of the manor in 1896. In view of this association they renamed Abbey House as Abbey House Manor.

== Plans for the future ==
The ambition of Whit and Kim Hanks over the period 2022–2024 is "to lovingly restore the house into a luxury hotel subject to receiving permissions". They also intend to restore and enhance Abbey House Manor gardens. In 2022, Freya Langford of the firm Graduate Gardeners was retained as head gardener, with a remit to manage the improvement and maintenance of the gardens. Langford had worked previously on the BBC TV programme Gardeners' World. During the 2022 summer season the gardens were opened to the public six times, from May to October on the second Saturday of each month, and the proceeds from the sale of tickets were given to Malmesbury Carnival for distribution to local charities. The intention was to explain to visitors the key features of the garden and the progress towards the goal of restoration and enhancement.
