= Malmesbury Castle =

- Malmesbury, Wiltshire, England

Site information
- Type: Motte and bailey
- Condition: No surviving traces

Location
- Shown within Wiltshire
- Coordinates: 51.5845°N 2.0995°W
- Grid reference: grid reference ST932873

Malmesbury Castle was a castle in the town of Malmesbury, Wiltshire, England.

== Details ==
The town of Malmesbury was an important settlement in the early medieval period, both as a trading centre and as the site of Malmesbury Abbey. Early in the 12th century the Abbey came under the control of Bishop Roger of Salisbury who built a motte and bailey castle close to the abbey adjacent to the church. In 1139 King Stephen of England had become concerned about the loyalty of Roger and several other bishops and seized their castles, including Malmesbury. The civil war of the Anarchy broke out shortly afterwards between Stephen and the rival claimant for the throne, the Empress Matilda, in which Malmesbury Castle played an active part.

At the start of the Anarchy, the local baron Robert fitz Hugh seized Malmesbury Castle from Stephen in 1139, but the king recaptured it shortly afterwards, sacking the town in the process. The castle became used by local royal forces to raid the surrounding countryside, much to the complaint of contemporary chroniclers. In 1144 Robert of Gloucester unsuccessfully besieged the castle, and it remained in royal hands until taken by the future Henry II in 1153 towards the end of the civil war. In the reign of King John the local monks petitioned to have the castle destroyed; the king agreed and it was demolished in the early 13th century.

Today no remains of the castle survive, and archaeology has yet to precisely identify the site of the castle within the modern town.

== See also ==
- Castles in Great Britain and Ireland
- List of castles in England

== Bibliography ==
- Davis, R. H. C. (1977) King Stephen. London: Longman. ISBN 0-582-48727-7.
- Pounds, Norman John Greville. (1994) The Medieval Castle in England and Wales: a social and political history. Cambridge: Cambridge University Press. ISBN 978-0-521-45828-3.
- Wiltshire County Archaeology Service. (2004) The Archaeology of Wiltshire's Towns, An Extensive Urban Survey: Malmesbury. Trowbridge, UK: Wiltshire County Archaeology Service.
