= Gauze Brook =

Stream in Wiltshire, England

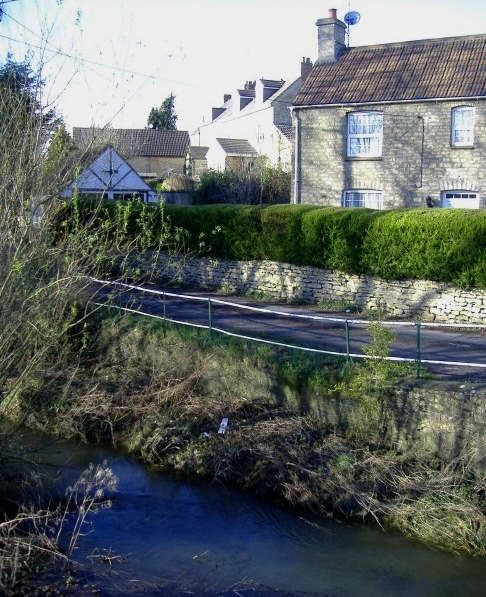
- Gauze Brook at Corston

Location
- Country: England
- Region: South West England
- District: Wiltshire

Physical characteristics
- Source: West Dunley Farm
  - location: Littleton Drew, Wiltshire, England
  - coordinates: 51.5265°N 2.2391°W
  - elevation: 377 ft (115 m)
- Mouth: Bristol Avon
  - location: Little Somerford, Wiltshire, England
  - coordinates: 51.5623°N 2.0802°W
  - elevation: 190 ft (58 m)
- Length: 9.1 mi (14.6 km)

Basin features
- River system: Bristol Avon

The Gauze Brook is a stream in South West England, which rises near the village of Littleton Drew in Wiltshire and flows in a northeasterly direction for approximately 9.1 miles (15 km) before joining the Bristol Avon near the village of Little Somerford.

== Course ==
Gauze Brook rises a little to the north east of the Wiltshire village of Littleton Drew and then flows to the northeast through Dunley Wood before passing to the north of Hullavington. The stream then passes underneath the South Wales main railway line before it arrives at the village of Corston. Just over a mile later it joins the Bristol Avon by Angrove Farm, near Little Somerford.
