= Eilmer of Malmesbury =

English monk

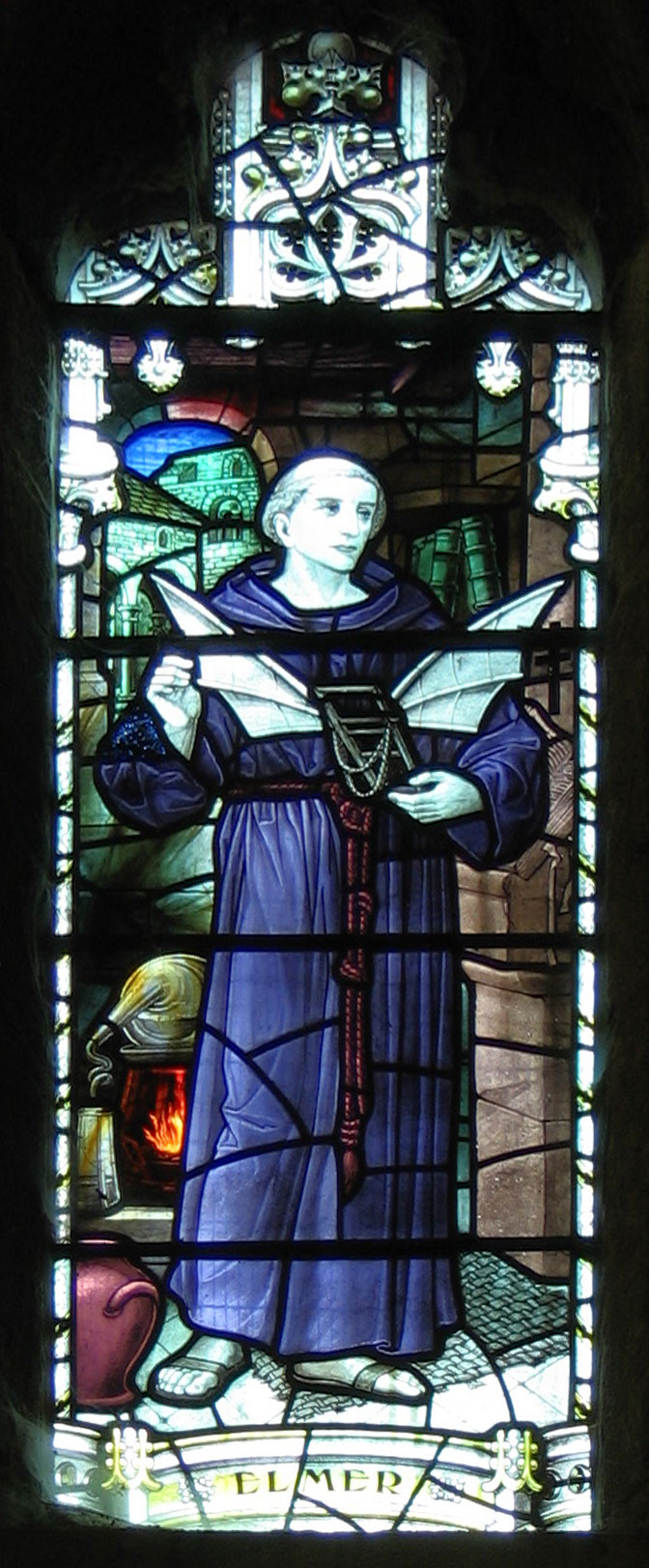
Stained glass window showing Eilmer, installed in Malmesbury Abbey in 1920

Eilmer of Malmesbury (also known as Oliver due to a scribe's miscopying, or Elmer, or Æthelmær) was an 11th-century English Benedictine monk best known for his early attempt at a gliding flight using wings.

== Life ==
Eilmer was a monk of Malmesbury Abbey who wrote on astrology. All that is known of him is from the Gesta regum Anglorum (Deeds of the English Kings), written by the eminent medieval historian William of Malmesbury in about 1125. Being a fellow monk of the same abbey, William almost certainly obtained his account directly from people who knew Eilmer when he was an old man.

Later scholars, such as the American historian of technology Lynn White, have attempted to estimate Eilmer's date of birth based on a quotation in William's Deeds about Halley's Comet, which appeared in 1066. However, William recorded Eilmer's quotation not to establish his age, but to show that a prophecy was fulfilled when the Normans invaded England.

You've come, have you? – You've come, you source of tears to many mothers. It is long since I saw you; but as I see you now you are much more terrible, for I see you brandishing the downfall of my country.

If Eilmer had seen Halley's Comet 76 years earlier in 989, he could have been born about 984, making him about five or six years old when he first saw the comet, and therefore old enough to remember it. However the periodicity of comets was probably unknown in Eilmer's time, and so his remark "It is long since I saw you" could have referred to a different, later comet. Since it is known that Eilmer was an "old man" in 1066, and that he had made the flight attempt "in his youth", the event is placed some time during the early 11th century, perhaps in its first decade.

Beyond those based on William's account, there are no other known sources documenting Eilmer's life.

== The flight ==
William records that, in Eilmer's youth, he had read and believed the Greek myth of Daedalus. Thus, Eilmer fixed wings to his hands and feet and launched himself from the top of a tower at Malmesbury Abbey:

He was a man learned for those times, of ripe old age, and in his early youth had hazarded a deed of remarkable boldness. He had by some means, I scarcely know what, fastened wings to his hands and feet so that, mistaking fable for truth, he might fly like Daedalus, and, collecting the breeze upon the summit of a tower, flew for more than a furlong [201 metres]. But agitated by the violence of the wind and the swirling of air, as well as by the awareness of his rash attempt, he fell, broke both his legs and was lame ever after. He used to relate as the cause of his failure, his forgetting to provide himself a tail.

Given the geography of the abbey, his landing site, and the account of his flight, to travel for "more than a furlong" (220 yards, 201 metres) he would have had to have been airborne for about 15 seconds. His exact flightpath is not known, nor how long he was in the air, because today's abbey is not the abbey of the 11th century, when it was probably smaller, although the tower was probably close to the present height. "Olivers Lane", off the present-day High Street and about 200 metres (660 ft) from the abbey, is reputed locally to be the site where Eilmer landed. That would have taken him over many buildings. Maxwell Woosnam's study concluded that he is more likely to have descended the steep hill off to the southwest of the abbey, rather than the town centre to the south.

Eilmer used a bird-like apparatus to glide downwards against the breeze. However, being unable to balance himself forward and backwards, as does a bird by slight movements of its wings, head and legs, he would have needed a large tail to maintain equilibrium. Eilmer could not have achieved true soaring flight, but he might have glided down safely with a tail. Eilmer said he had "forgotten to provide himself with a tail."

== Historical traditions and influence ==
Other than William's account of the flight, nothing has survived of Eilmer's lifetime work as a monk, although his astrological treatises apparently still circulated as late as the 16th century.

Based on William's account, the story of Eilmer's flight has been retold many times through the centuries by scholars, encyclopaedists, and proponents of man-powered flight, keeping the idea of human flight alive. These include over the years: Helinand of Froidmont (before 1229), Alberic of Trois-Fontaines (before 1241), Vincent of Beauvais (1250s), Roger Bacon (c. 1260), Ranulf Higden (before 1352, and the first to misname him "Oliver") and the English translators of his work: Henry Knighton (before 1367), John Nauclerus of Tübingen (c. 1500), John Wilkins (1648), John Milton (1670), and John Wise (1850).

More recently, Maxwell Woosnam in 1986 examined in more detail the technical aspects such as materials, glider angles, and wind effects.

Contemporaries had developed small drawstring toy helicopters, windmills, and sails for boats while church artists increasingly showed angels with more accurate bird-like wings, detailing the camber (curvature) that would help develop lift for heavier-than-air flight. Air was accepted as something that could be "worked", and some people believed that humans could fly with physical effort and the right equipment. Still, for the monk Eilmer the idea of flight must have had a spiritual significance as well: he would not have been ignorant of the need to guard and stabilize the soul for its flight in the afterlife; the differences between angelic and human bodies; the weight of sin and the unnaturalness of ascending mortal flesh.

== Legacy ==
The School of Mechanical and Mining Engineering at the University of Queensland in Brisbane, Australia, has developed a Computational Fluid Dynamics simulation code named Eilmer4. The short film "Eilmer the Flying Monk" recounts Eilmer's attempt to emulate Icarus.

== See also ==
- List of firsts in aviation
