= Malmesbury =

Town in Wiltshire, England

Coordinates: 51.584°N 2.098°W

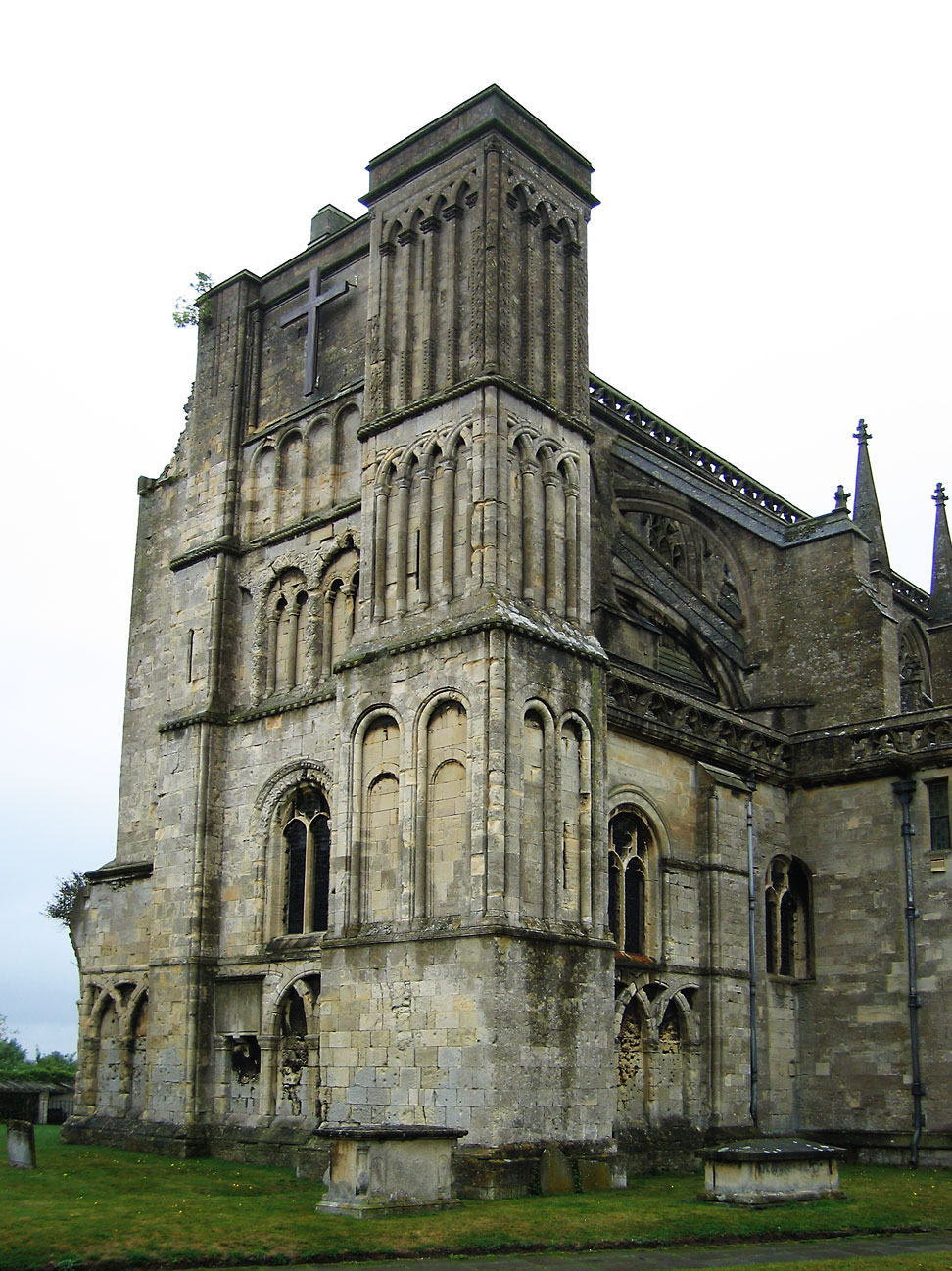
- Malmesbury Abbey

- Location within Wiltshire
- Population: 5,969 (2021 Census)
- Demonym: Jackdaws (in informal contexts—blason populaire)
- OS grid reference: ST940857
- Unitary authority: Wiltshire
- Ceremonial county: Wiltshire
- Region: South West
- Country: England
- Sovereign state: United Kingdom
- Post town: Malmesbury
- Postcode district: SN16
- Dialling code: 01666
- Police: Wiltshire
- Fire: Dorset and Wiltshire
- Ambulance: South Western
- UK Parliament: South Cotswolds
- Website: Town Council

Malmesbury (/ˈmɑː(l)mzbəri/) is a town and civil parish in north Wiltshire, England, which lies approximately 14 miles (23 km) west of Swindon, 25 miles (40 km) northeast of Bristol, 9 miles (14 km) north of Chippenham and 5 miles south of Tetbury. The older part of the town is on a hilltop which is almost surrounded by the upper waters of the Bristol Avon and one of its tributaries.

Once the site of an Iron Age fort, in the early medieval period Malmesbury became the site of Malmesbury Abbey, a monastery famed for its learning. It was later home to one of Alfred the Great's fortified burhs for defence against the Vikings. Æthelstan, the first king of all England, was buried in the abbey when he died in 939. As a market town, it became prominent in the Middle Ages as a centre for learning, focused on and around the abbey.

In modern times, Malmesbury is best known for its abbey, the bulk of which forms a rare survival of the dissolution of the monasteries. The economy benefits mostly from agriculture, as well as tourism to the Cotswolds; Dyson is the town's main employer. At the 2021 census, the population of the parish was almost 6,000.

== Geography ==
Malmesbury sits on a flat Cotswolds hilltop at the convergence of two rivers. The town has a maximum elevation of 146 metres (479 ft) and a minimum of 56 metres (184 ft); the average elevation is 92 metres (302 ft) above sea level. From the west, the infant (Bristol) Avon flows from Sherston, and from the north west, a tributary either known as the Tetbury Avon, River Avon (Tetbury branch), or—locally—The Ingleburn. They flow within 200 metres (660 ft) of each other but are separated by a narrow and high isthmus which forces the Bristol Avon south and the Tetbury Avon east. This creates a rocky outcrop as a south-facing, gently sloping hilltop, until the two rivers meet on the southern edge of the town. With steep sides, in places cliff-like, the town was described by Sir William Waller as the best naturally defended inland location he had seen.

In the 19th and 20th centuries the town expanded to the northwest, occupying land between the two rivers which was formerly in Westport and Brokenborough parishes. In the later 20th and early 21st, development was to the north, as far as the area known as Filands which is bounded by the B4014 road.

== History ==
The hilltop contains several freshwater springs, which helped early settlements. It was the site of an Iron Age fort, and in the Anglo-Saxon period it had a monastery famed as a centre of learning. The town is listed in the Burghal Hidage as one of Alfred the Great's defended burhs assessed at 1200 hides, its Iron Age defences helping to provide protection against Viking attack. The town was described in the Domesday Book of 1086 as a borough. Also within the Domesday Book it is reported to be within the Hundred (county division) of Cicementone. Alfred's grandson, Æthelstan, the first king of England, was buried in Malmesbury Abbey in 939.

=== Malmesbury Abbey ===
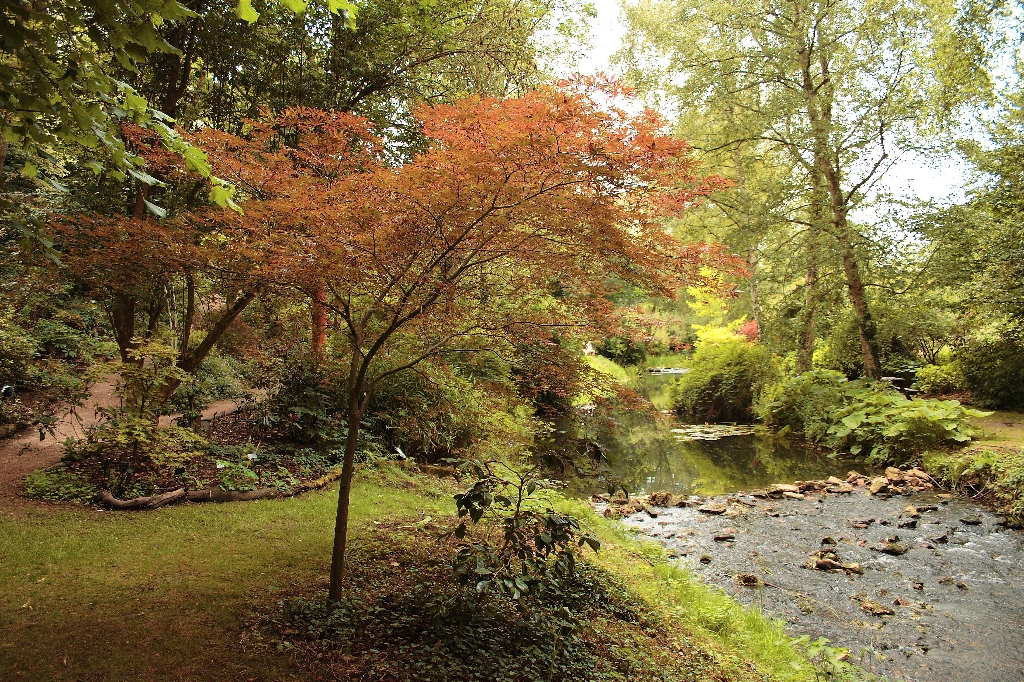
Abbey Gardens along the River Avon

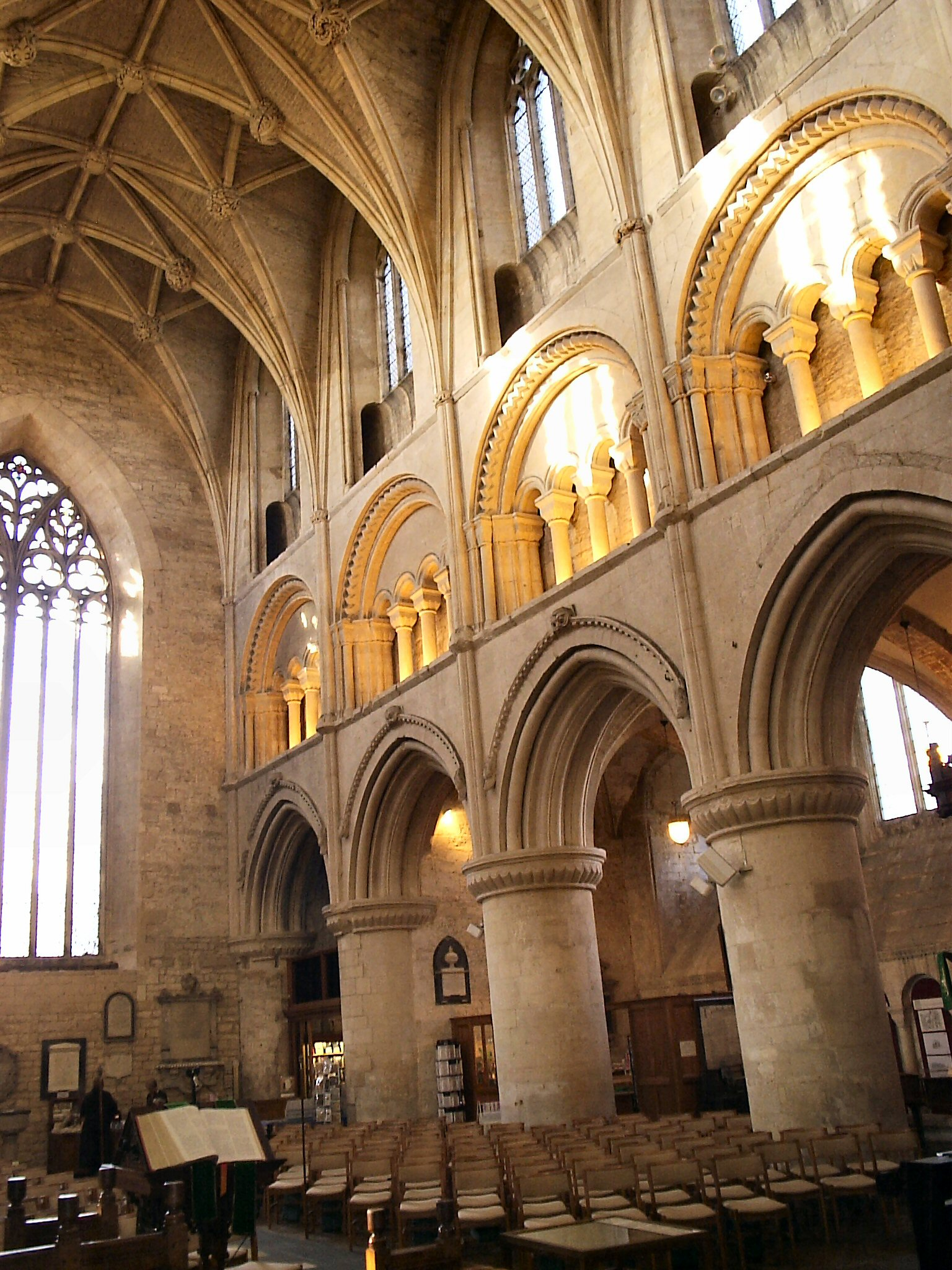
The interior of Malmesbury Abbey

The Abbey was founded in 675 by Maildubh, Mailduf or Maelduib, an Irishman. The town came to be named after Maildubh; the name Malmesbury is a combination of Maildubh and burh, meaning Maildubh's fortification. After his death around 700, St Aldhelm became the first abbot and built the first church organ in England, which was described as a "mighty instrument with innumerable tones, blown with bellows, and enclosed in a gilded case." Having founded other churches in the area, including at Bradford on Avon, he died in 709 and was canonised. The Abbey's architecture is listed in the highest category and it is a Scheduled Ancient Monument.

Across the River Avon's Sherston branch via the footpath by 18 Gloucester Street (leading south-west) is a depression called Daniels Well, and a farm beyond it is named after this. This derives from a monk called Daniel named after an earlier Daniel of Winchester. This former bishop, on losing his sight, lived at the abbey briefly until death in 745 and was educated there. The later monk is said to have submerged himself in the cold water every day for decades to quell fiery passions.

The Abbey was the site of an early attempt at human flight in 1010, when, as noted by historian William of Malmesbury, the monk Eilmer of Malmesbury flew a primitive hang glider from a tower. Eilmer flew over 180 metres before landing, breaking both his legs.

By the time of the Norman invasion in 1066, Malmesbury was one of the most significant towns in England. It is listed first (thus most important) in the Wiltshire section of the Domesday Book. King Henry I's chancellor, Roger of Salisbury, seized the monastery under his bishopric in 1118, and held it for 20 years. Renowned as a great builder, he rebuilt the wooden town walls wholly in stone rather than wood, constructing the short-lived Malmesbury Castle at the same time.

By the Middle Ages, the north of the town was heavily developed as a religious centre, resulting in the construction of the third Abbey on the site, the 12th-century Malmesbury Abbey, which had a spire 7 metres (23 ft) taller than the 123 metres (404 ft) one of Salisbury Cathedral. In 1220 this resulted in the construction of the Abbey guest house, which is now The Old Bell hotel and claims to be the oldest hotel in England. The Abbey's spire collapsed in either the late 15th or early 16th century. Under his English Reformation, King Henry VIII, sold the substantial land, but retaining a minor choice portion, to a local clothier William Stumpe. The extant part of the Abbey is now the parish church; the remains containing a parvise which still holds some fine examples of books from the former Abbey library.

Malmesbury natives are sometimes nicknamed Jackdaws, originating from the avian colony of these that inhabit the Abbey walls and roof.

=== Battles ===
The community was the ancient frontier of two kingdoms—Tetbury 5 miles (8.0 km) to the north was in Mercia, while Malmesbury was in the West Saxon Kingdom—resulting in centuries of animosity between the two towns. The location and defensive position of Malmesbury on the latterly important Oxford to Bristol route made it a strategic military point. During the 12th century civil war between Stephen of England and his cousin the Empress Matilda, the succession agreement between Stephen and Henry of Anjou (later Henry II) was reached after their armies faced each other across the impassable River Avon at Malmesbury in the winter of 1153, with Stephen losing by refusing battle.

During the Civil War the town changed hands seven times; the south face of Malmesbury Abbey still today bears pock-marks from cannon and gunshot. In 1646 Parliament ordered that the town walls be destroyed. As peace came to inland England, and the need to defend the developing coastal port towns became more important, Malmesbury, without its Abbey, lost its importance. As developing transport and trade routes passed it by, it regressed to a regional market town.

=== Malmesbury Commoners ===
At the Battle of Brunanburh in 937, King Æthelstan of Wessex defeated an army of northern English and Scots and made a claim to become the first 'King of All England'. Helped by many men from Malmesbury, in gratitude he gave the townsfolk their freedom, along with 600 hides of land to the south of the town, although the charters on which the land grants are based are now known to be forgeries. The status of freemen of Malmesbury was passed down through the generations and remains to this day. Since at least the 17th century, the right has been only handed down from father to son or son-in-law. There is a maximum of 280 commoners. To be a commoner, one has to be born to a freeman or marry the daughter of one. Since 2000, women were admitted for the first time—the daughters of freemen. The organisation, The Warden and Freemen of Malmesbury, still owns the land to the south of the town, along with dozens of properties, pubs and shops within the town itself, providing affordable housing to townsfolk.

=== Westport St Mary ===
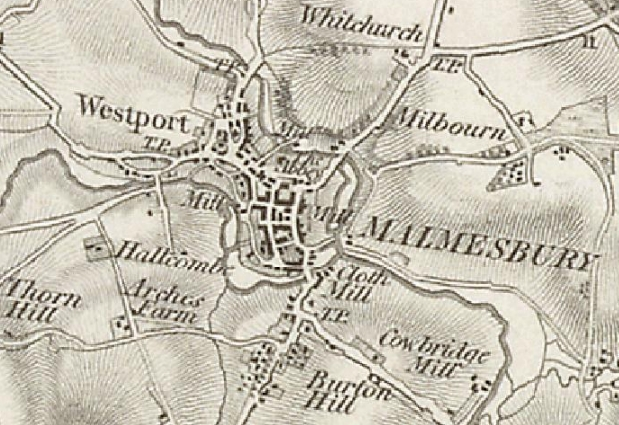
Malmesbury and Westport from the Ordnance Survey one-inch map, first edition, 1828

Westport, sometimes called Westport St. Mary, was a village and civil parish immediately west of Malmesbury, outside the confines of the hilltop. The philosopher Thomas Hobbes was born in Westport in 1588; his father, also Thomas, lived at Westport while serving as curate of Brokenborough.

Westport no longer exists as a separate village and is not named on modern maps. The built-up area was incorporated in the borough of Malmesbury in 1934, and the rural parts of the parish were incorporated in 1896 into the parish of St Paul Malmesbury Without.

== Government ==
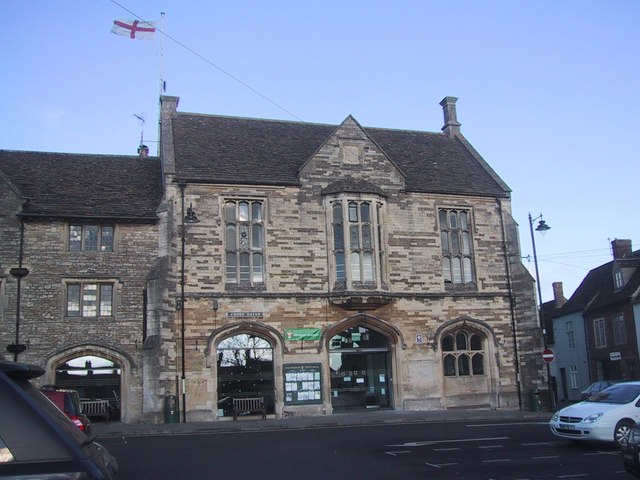
Malmesbury Town Hall

Malmesbury was a municipal borough until 1974, when Malmesbury Town Council was formed as a successor to it. The council is made up of sixteen councillors, who annually elect a town mayor and deputy town mayor from their number. The town council meets at Malmesbury Town Hall.

Malmesbury was in the area of Wiltshire County Council from its creation in 1889 until it was disbanded in 2009. In 1974, the municipal borough was merged into the North Wiltshire district.

In 2009, Wiltshire Council succeeded the county council and district council as a unitary authority. For elections to Wiltshire Council, Malmesbury forms one electoral division, returning a single unitary councillor. Gavin Grant, a Liberal Democrat, was re-elected in 2021, following his initial election in 2017.

At UK Government level in the House of Commons, Malmesbury is part of the South Cotswolds constituency, represented since 2024 by Roz Savage for the Liberal Democrats.

== Public services ==
Malmesbury is policed by the Wiltshire Police force and is in the Royal Wootton Bassett Community Policing Team area. Fire services are provided by the Dorset & Wiltshire Fire and Rescue Service, and ambulance services by the South Western Ambulance Service. Malmesbury is also served by the charity-funded Wiltshire Air Ambulance.

A GP surgery—Malmesbury Primary Care Centre—is located in the town and is overseen by the Bath and North East Somerset, Swindon, and Wiltshire Integrated Care Board. The NHS hospitals overseen by the board are Great Western Hospital in Swindon, Royal United Hospital in Bath, and Salisbury Hospital. There are also nearby minor injuries units in Tetbury and Chippenham.

Waste management services are overseen by Wiltshire Council, which provides recycling, refuse and garden waste collection.

Scottish and Southern Electricity Networks is the electricity distribution network operator which supplies the area.

Wessex Water is responsible for the provision of drinking water and sewerage in the area.

== Demography ==
At the 2011 census the population was 5,380 in 2,280 homes. In the table below, the additional figures in the 19th century are for The Abbey, the supplemental ecclesiastical parish added to that of St Paul. Figures for 1901 are for the parishes of St Paul Within, St Paul Without and Abbey, respectively. Figures from 1911 are for the municipal borough, and after 1961 for the ward.

Population of Malmesbury
Year	1801	1811	1821	1831	1841	1851	1881	1891	
Population	1,491 + 80	1,609 + 137	1,976 + 169	2,169 +124	2,367 + 131	2,443 + 138	2,220 + 150	2,144 + 119	
Year	1901	1911	1921	1931	1941	1951	1961	2001	2011
Population	1,181 + 974 + 106	2,656	2,407	2,334	2,464	2,510	4,631	2,610	5,380

== Economy ==
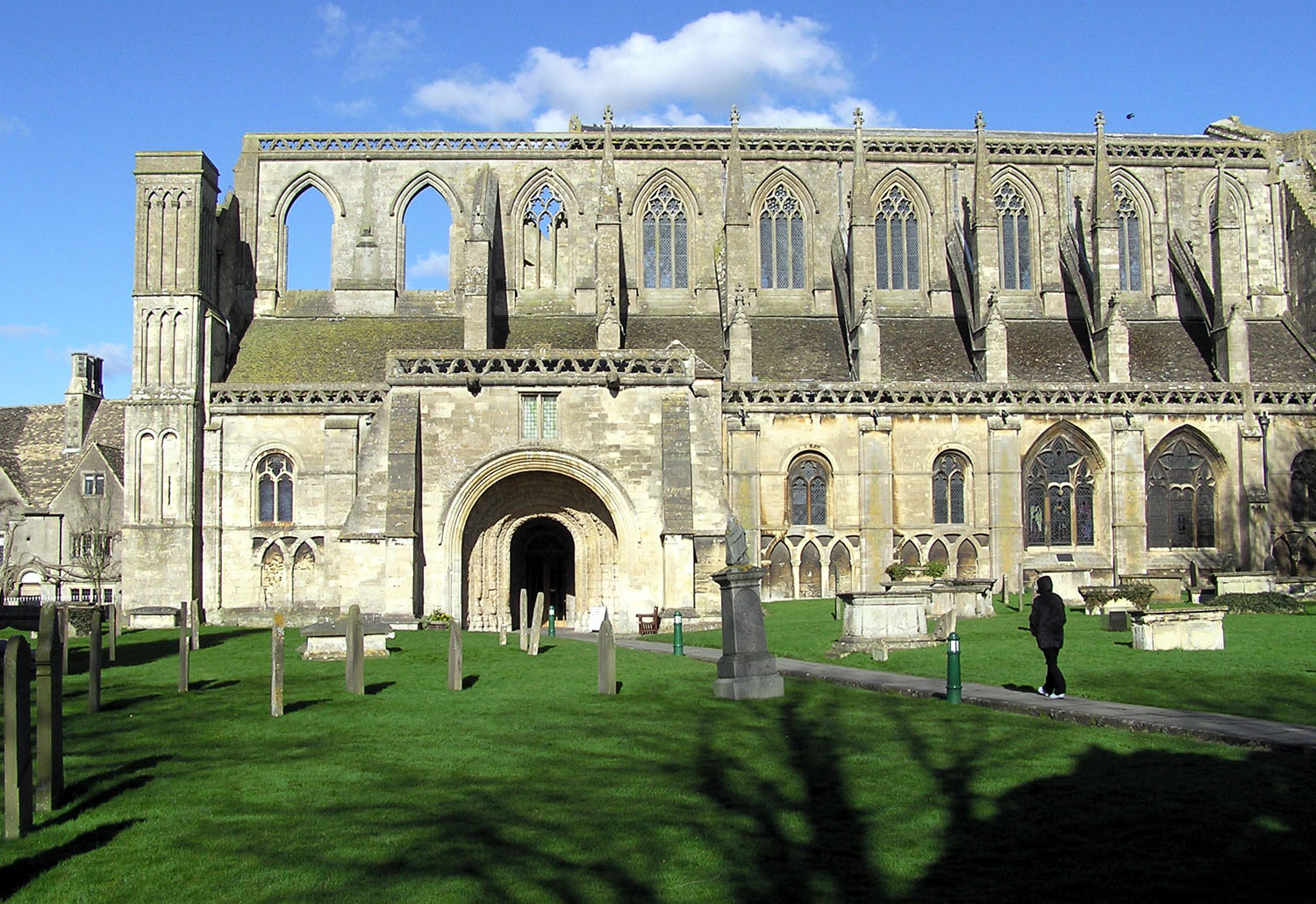
The main entrance to Malmesbury Abbey (the South Porch) seen from the graveyard. This image shows the full modern extent of the Abbey; to the right lie only ruins.

Traditionally a market town serving the rural area of north west Wiltshire, farming has been the main industry. Even today, the High Street has numerous independent shops and a weekly farmers' market. The Reformation of 1539 brought about a change in the economy of Malmesbury: having no income from the Abbey, the town turned to the wool spinning and weaving industry, having access to large quantities of wool and water. It then became a centre of the lace-making industry. But, what had made it successful and important as a religious and strategic defensive centre—water on three sides and steep cliffs—precluded easy access for the modern bulk transport methods of canals and railways. Hence the Kennet and Avon Canal and the later Great Western Railway passed well to the south of the town; while local quarrying of cotswold stone provided often transient booms in employment, Malmesbury saw little expansion compared to, for example, Gloucester, by not being a commuter suburb or major production centre of the Industrial Revolution.

The town's main employer today is Dyson, which has a site on the edge of the town which employs around 4,000. This is mainly a research, development and design site; manufacturing is carried out in Malaysia. The site was the company's headquarters until 2019, when it was announced that the company registration would be moved to Singapore.

The town's economy profits from tourism, divided among Cotswold Hills retreats (ranging from B&Bs to golf/spa resorts), visits and tours of the abbey, nearby landmarks and festivals or by interest in the counter-modernism 1960s work of poet laureate, John Betjeman.

Malmesbury had a nine-day wonder media event in January 1998, when two Tamworth pigs known as the Tamworth Two escaped from the town's abattoir. They swam the Tetbury branch of the River Avon, across a few fields and lived in an orchard for a week. The story made international headlines with tabloid newspapers and TV news stations fighting each other to sight and then capture the pigs. The pigs were recaptured, and lived out their lives in an animal rescue centre.

=== EKCO factory ===
At the beginning of the Second World War, the electronics company EKCO moved part of its operations from Southend-on-Sea to Cowbridge House, 3/4 mile (1.2 km) southeast of the town, to avoid the danger of bombing. The company established a shadow factory to produce radar equipment, then a new technology. The factory continued production after the war, was taken over by Pye TMC and then Philips, and later became part of AT&T. The site was in use as offices until 2004 when the owners, Lucent Technologies, moved their operations to Swindon and the building was converted to housing.

== Culture and community ==
Malmesbury has an annual carnival, which takes place throughout August. This consists of various events throughout the month, culminating in a procession through the town, typically held on the last Saturday. Since its inception in 1917, it has grown to include more than 30 events, ranging from music events to an attempt on the world record for the largest pillow fight.

From 2007 to 2024, the annual world music festival WOMAD Charlton Park was held each summer in Charlton Park, near Malmesbury.

=== Community facilities ===
Malmesbury has a number of public parks and gardens. Three of these (St Aldhelm's Mead, Cuckingstool Mead and White Lion Recreation Park) were registered in 2013 as Fields in Trust, giving them long-lasting protection as free, open recreational spaces. Malmesbury also has a leisure centre (The Activity Zone) and a public library, both of which are managed by Wiltshire Council. A mobile library also serves the town.

=== Sport and leisure ===
Malmesbury has a non-League football team Malmesbury Victoria F.C., who play at The Flying Monk Ground in the Hellenic Football League. A swimming club, 'Malmesbury Marlins', train at The Activity Zone leisure centre. Malmesbury Cricket Club are an ECB Clubmark accredited sports club who play at The Wortheys sports ground, with adult and junior teams playing in the Wiltshire Leagues.

=== Twin towns ===
Malmesbury is twinned with the following places:

- Gien, France
- Niebüll, Germany
- Bad Hersfeld, Germany

Malmesbury also has friendship agreements with three other towns and cities:

- Cherkasy, Ukraine
- Malmesbury, South Africa

== Religion ==
=== Church of England ===
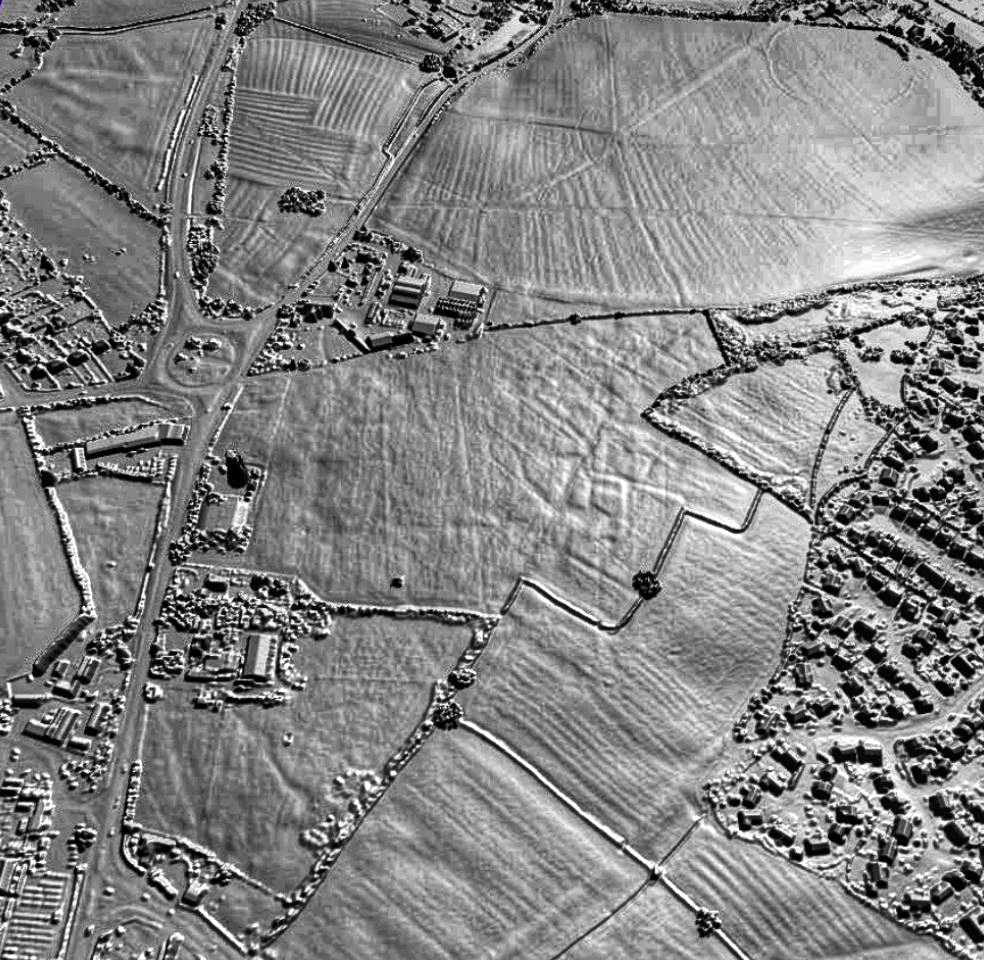
A lidar view, looking southwards, of the site of the Chapel of St James and a possible Medieval or post Medieval occupation area at Whychurch Farm, north-east Malmesbury. HER Ref MWI77249

In the Church of England, Malmesbury Abbey has served as the parish church since 1541, following on from the former parish church of St Paul. Malmesbury forms part of the modern ecclesiastical parish of Malmesbury and Brokenborough, which joins with the ecclesiastical parish of Corston with Rodbourne to form the benefice of Malmesbury and Upper Avon. The parish is in the Deanery of North Wiltshire, a sub-division of the larger Archdeaconry of Malmesbury in the Diocese of Bristol. The Abbey is dedicated to Saint Peter and Saint Paul.

=== Roman Catholic Church ===
The local Roman Catholic church in Malmesbury is St Aldhelm's Church, which serves the ecclesiastical parish of St Aldhelm, Malmesbury. The Catholic parish covers a larger area than the Church of England parish, and falls within the St Aldhelm pastoral area of the Diocese of Clifton. The church is dedicated to St Aldhelm, who lived in Malmesbury. A stained glass window honoring St Carlo Acutis was installed in 2024.

=== Other churches ===
Malmesbury is also home to Malmesbury United Reformed Church and The King's Church. There are also a number of former churches in the town, including an old Moravian church which is now owned by Athelstan Museum and called The Julia & Hans Rausing Building.

== Planning ==
In 2011 Malmesbury was chosen by the Department for Communities and Local Government as a "front-runner" area to test Neighbourhood Planning powers introduced in the Localism Act 2011. As part of the neighbourhood planning process in February 2012 a series of seminars and workshops involving residents and stakeholders were run in Malmesbury by The Prince's Foundation for Building Community. In March 2012 issues of planning in Malmesbury were featured as part of the wider national debate about changes to the planning system and the balance of power between communities and developers.

== Landmarks ==
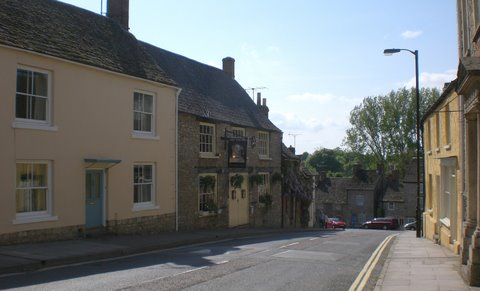
Typical scene in central Malmesbury, showing older modernised property, but highly preserved from its original construction

What made Malmesbury successful as a town—water and excellent defences—led to its current layout and the presence of over 300 listed buildings within its boundaries. Roger of Salisbury reconstructed the town after his accession to Bishop of Salisbury in 1102, and the Saxon layout he rebuilt is retained in the centre today. The geography also precluded easy development for mass transport and hence hindered industrial development, leaving the architecture and ancient buildings largely untouched. The result is a higher proportion of Grade I and Grade II buildings than in many other English towns.

=== Grade I listed ===
The parish has six Grade I listed structures, all of them within the hilltop town.

==== Malmesbury Abbey ====
The surviving nave of the 12th-century abbey church, built in limestone ashlar with stone tiles, serves as the parish church. In the period 1350–1450 the building was enlarged and a clerestory, crossing spire and west towers were added; the spire fell in 1479. After the Dissolution, William Stumpe reduced and altered the building to form the parish church. The west tower fell c. 1662.

Features of the building include the south porch, richly carved with Biblical scenes, which Pevsner describes as "among the best pieces of Norman sculpture and decoration in England".

The abbey was placed on Historic England's Heritage at Risk Register in November 2022, owing to the condition of its roofs.

==== Market Cross ====
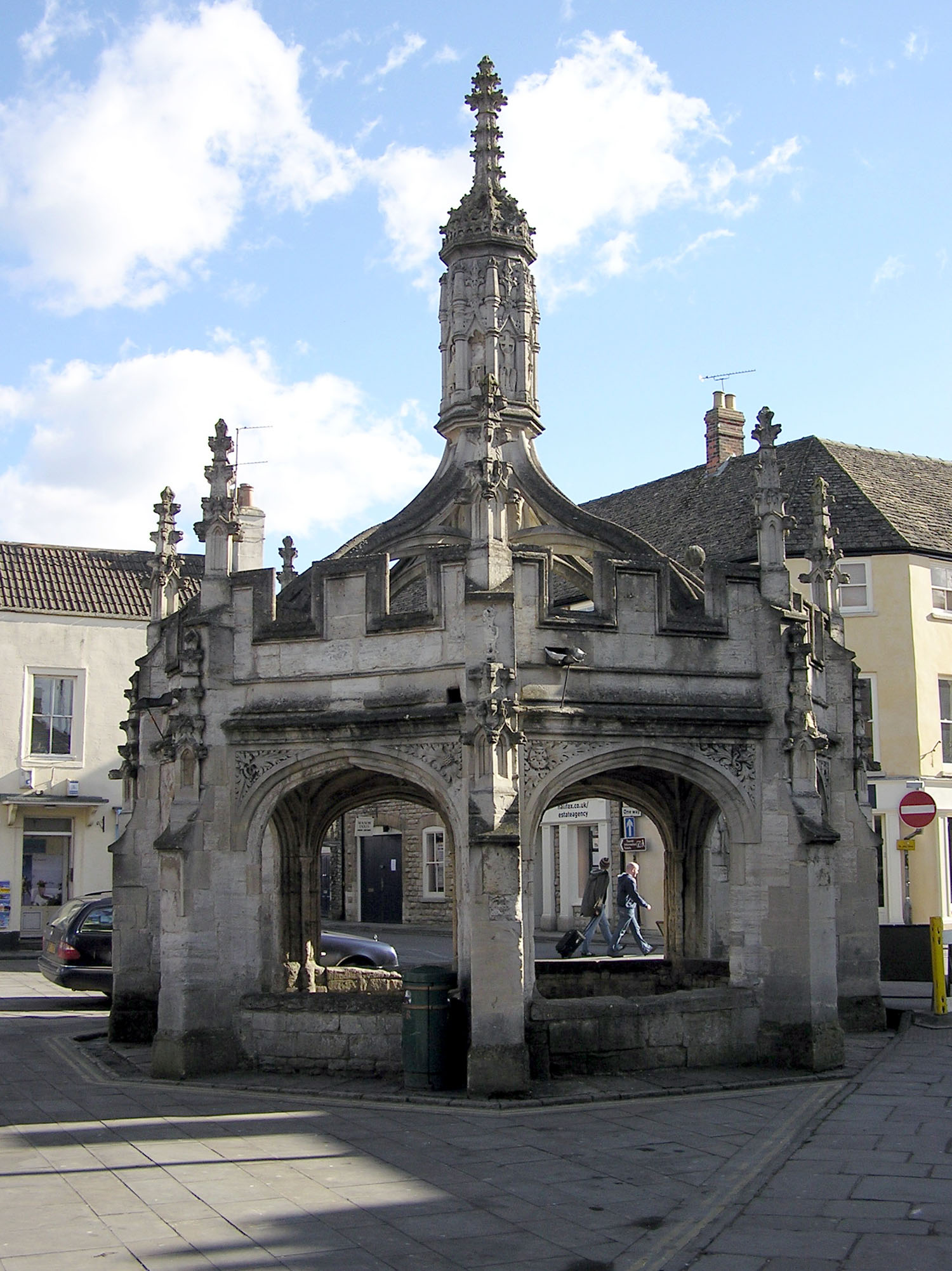
Malmesbury Market Cross, c. 1490

In the centre of the town stands the market cross, built c. 1490, possibly using stone salvaged from the recently ruined part of the abbey. It was described by John Leland, writing in the 1540s, as a "right fair and costely peace of worke", which was built to shelter the "poore market folkes" when "rayne cummith". An elaborately carved octagonal structure, it is recognised as one of the best preserved of its kind in England. It still serves as a public shelter today, nicknamed "The Birdcage" because of its appearance.

Numbers 1 and 3 Market Cross are also listed buildings, as is the former Abbey Brewery opposite.

==== St Paul's bell tower ====
The 15th-century three-stage tower is all that remains of St Paul's church, which stood adjacent to the abbey and was the town's parish church until 1541, when that role was transferred to the former abbey church. The nave of St Paul's had collapsed by the early 16th century, and the remainder was used for a time as a private house and town hall; the chancel was pulled down in 1852. Today it serves as the bell tower for the abbey.

==== Abbey House ====
Abbey House was rebuilt c. 1540 by William Stumpe or his son James, on the site of a 13th-century building within the abbey grounds; Harold Brakspear carried out 20th-century enlargement. The surrounding Abbey House Gardens were replanted in 2022 and are occasionally open to visitors.

==== The Old Bell hotel ====
The former guest house for the abbey dates from the early 13th century. The building was extended and altered in the late 15th century or early 16th, and from c. 1530 it was used as a cloth mill by William Stumpe. Further alterations were made in the 17th century and in 1908. There is a fine ashlar fire hood of c. 1220. Today the building is a hotel, The Old Bell. The hotel lays claim to the title of the oldest purpose-built hotel in England to still be in use today.

==== Former court house ====
From the 13th century or earlier, there was a hospital of St John the Baptist in the south of the town. In the 16th century the hospital was bought by the corporation, who used part of it for meetings of the borough court from 1616. The former court house, in limestone rubble with a 15th-century roof and retaining some 17th and 18th-century court fittings, is now part of a dwelling. Nearby is the 12th-century entrance arch of the hospital and the 16th-century almshouses, in use until 1948; now three cottages, Grade II* listed.

=== Other buildings ===
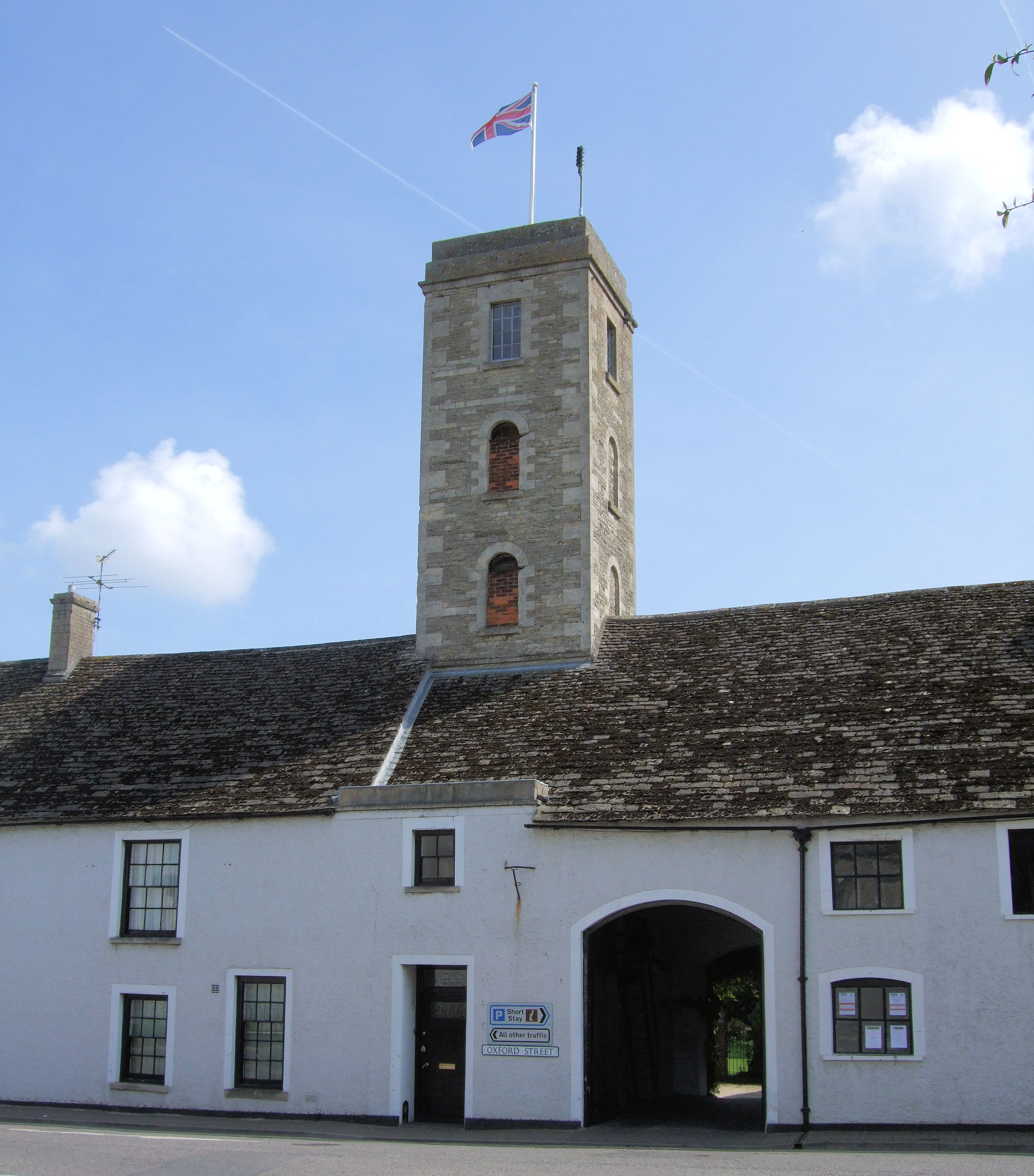
Tower House

==== Tower House ====
A large building of medieval origins, now a private home, Tower House stands at the end of Oxford Street. It contains a high-roofed main hall where it is said Henry VIII dined after hunting in nearby Bradon Forest. In the 1840s, a doctor living in the house, with a passion for astronomy, built a narrow tower protruding high from the roof. The Grade II* listed building dominates the skyline of the east of the town.

==== St Aldhelm's Roman Catholic Church ====
St Aldhelm's Church is a Catholic church, built on Cross Hayes (the town's former marketplace, now a car park) in 1875. The church is named after the town's patron saint and associated with the local Catholic primary school, St Joseph's. Part of the church's presbytery is Grade II listed.

==== War Memorial ====
A war memorial was erected at The Triangle in 1921, following the First World War. This consists of a celtic cross based on the Cross of St Martin on the island of Iona, where Aldhelm had studied. The cross is built of Portland, blue pennant and Hopton Wood Stone. The memorial is Grade II listed.

== Transport ==
The A429 bypasses the town on its eastern edge; the road links Malmesbury with junction 17 of the M4 motorway to the south, and Kemble railway station and Cirencester to the north. Before the bypass was built in the later 20th century, the route followed the High Street, leaving the town to the north-east via Holloway. Three B roads meet at Malmesbury: the B4014 to Tetbury, the B4040 to Sherston and the B4042 to Royal Wootton Bassett, near Swindon.

Malmesbury railway station opened on 17 December 1877. The Malmesbury branch was built largely by the Malmesbury Railway Company, and was completed by the Great Western Railway which absorbed the Malmesbury Railway Company in May 1877 when the latter could not raise sufficient funds to complete the line. The branch split from the main London-Bristol line at Dauntsey, although a later connection with the northern GWR 'mainline' to the Severn Tunnel and South Wales was made at Little Somerford. Just short of its terminus, the line ran through a short tunnel: the only tunnel on the line between Malmesbury and Paddington. The station closed to passengers on 8 September 1951, and to freight in 1962. The tracks were used for a while to test new diesel locomotives built by Swindon railway works, but lifted in the 1970s, and the site of the station is now home to an industrial estate.

The nearest stations today, all managed and served by Great Western Railway, are:

- Kemble on the Golden Valley Line
- Chippenham on the Great Western Main Line
- Swindon on the Great Western Main Line

The town's bus network is run by Coachstyle, who run a town service in addition to services to and from Swindon, Yate, Chippenham and Cirencester.

== Media ==
Local news and television programmes are provided by BBC West and ITV West Country. Television signals are received from the Mendip TV transmitter. Local radio stations are BBC Radio Wiltshire, Heart West and Greatest Hits Radio South West. The town is served by these local newspapers: Gazette and Herald and Wilts and Gloucestershire Standard.

== Education ==
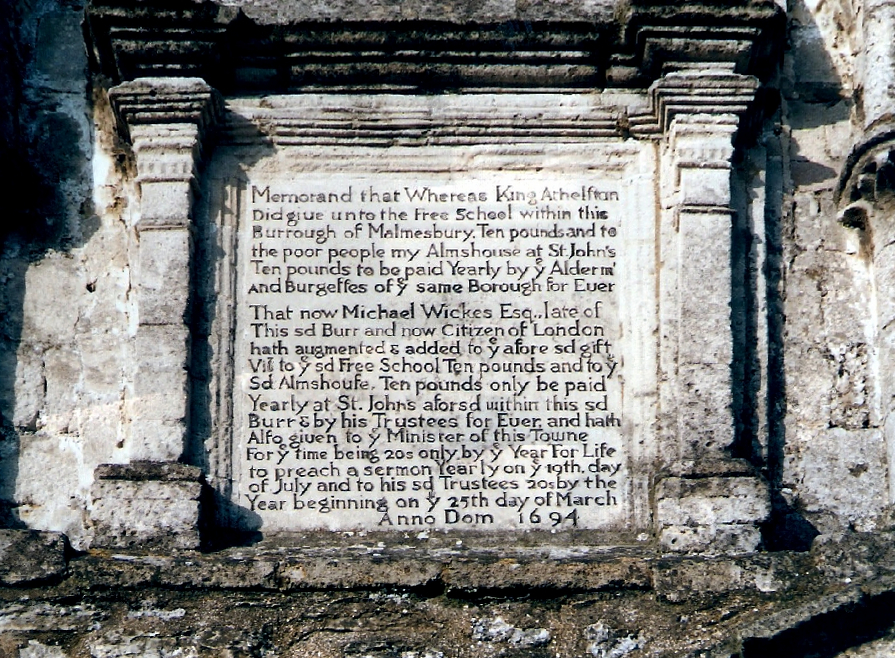
Tablet describing charitable bequests on the wall of St John's almshouse (Note: The inscription reads: Memorand that whereas King Athelstan did give unto the Free School within this borough of Malmesbury ten pounds and to the poor people my almshouse at St John's, ten pounds to be paid yearly by the Aldermen and Burgesses of the same borough for ever. That now Michael Wickes Esquire, late of this said borough and now citizen of London hath augmented and added to the aforesaid gift, viz. to the said Free School ten pounds and to the said almshouse, ten pounds only be paid yearly at St. John's aforesaid within this said borough and by his trustees for ever, and hath also given to the minister of this town for the time being 20s. only by the year for life to preach a sermon yearly on the 19th day of July and to his said trustees 20s. by the year beginning on the 25th day of August. Anno Domini 1694.)

There are two primary schools in Malmesbury: Malmesbury Church of England Primary School and St Joseph's Roman Catholic Primary School. There is also a secondary school, Malmesbury School, which was founded 1971.

In 2017, the Dyson Institute of Engineering and Technology was founded by James Dyson. This higher education institution is located on the Dyson technology campus. The Dyson Institute Village was built in 2019 to provide on-campus student accommodation.

== Notable people ==
For a full list, see: Category:People from Malmesbury

- Maildubh – Irish saint and monk, namesake of Malmesbury
- Aldhelm – Saxon scholar, bishop, poet, musician; patron saint of Wessex and the abbey's first abbot
- King Æthelstan – first king of all England
- Eilmer of Malmesbury – Benedictine monk, best known for his early attempt at a gliding flight using wings
- William of Malmesbury – monk and historian
- William Stumpe – clothier and politician, best known for purchasing Malmesbury Abbey after the dissolution of the monasteries
- Alice Seeley Harris – missionary and photographer
- Thomas Hobbes – prominent British philosopher
- Samuel McDonald – footballer
- Hannah Twynnoy – barmaid; reputedly the first person killed by a tiger in Britain
- John Luce, senior Royal Navy officer during and after the First World War
- Basil Reed – cricketer
- James Scott Douglas – racing driver and the 6th Baronet Douglas
- Roger Scruton – philosopher
- James Constable – footballer

== See also ==
- Malmesbury Hundred
- Malmesbury (UK Parliament constituency)
- St Paul Malmesbury Without
