= Listed buildings in Malmesbury =

Buildings in Bradford-on-Avon, Wiltshire, England

Malmesbury is a town and civil parish in Wiltshire, England. It contains 318 listed buildings that are recorded in the National Heritage List for England. Of these six are grade I, 14 are grade II* and 298 are grade II.

This list is based on the information retrieved online from Historic England.

== Key ==
Grade	Criteria
I	Buildings that are of exceptional interest
II*	Particularly important buildings of more than special interest
II	Buildings that are of special interest

== Listing ==
Name	Grade	Location	Type	Completed (Note: The date given is the date used by Historic England as significant for the initial building or that of an important part in the structure's description.)	Date designated	Grid ref. (Note: The grid reference is based on the British national grid reference system, sometimes known as OSGB36, used by the Ordnance Survey.) Geo-coordinates	Notes	Entry number (Note: The "List Entry Number" is a unique number assigned to each listed building and scheduled monument by Historic England.)	Image	Wikidata
Railings and Piers to Strict Baptist Chapel Graveyard	II	Abbey Row			1 July 1976	ST9317087350; 51°35′06″N 2°06′00″W		1269519	Upload Photo	Q26559627
Tomb of M and G Canter to North End of Strict Baptist Graveyard	II	Abbey Row			1 July 1976	ST9316887375; 51°35′07″N 2°06′00″W		1269520	Upload Photo	Q26559628
The Old Bell Hotel and Attached Front Area Walls and Railings	I	Abbey Row			18 January 1949	ST9322587331; 51°35′05″N 2°05′57″W		1269521	The Old Bell Hotel and Attached Front Area Walls and Railings More images	Q7754804
Wall Attached to West Corner of the Old Bell Hotel	II	Abbey Row			1 July 1976	ST9319887341; 51°35′06″N 2°05′58″W		1269522	Wall Attached to West Corner of the Old Bell Hotel More images	Q26559629
Avon House And Attached Walls, Piers And Railings	II*	Abbey Row			18 January 1949	ST9314687368; 51°35′06″N 2°06′01″W		1269554	Avon House And Attached Walls, Piers And Railings More images	Q17545788
Strict Baptist Chapel	II	Abbey Row			1 July 1976	ST9317887368; 51°35′06″N 2°05′59″W		1269562	Strict Baptist Chapel More images	Q26559667
Numbers 19 and 21 and Attached Front Railings	II	19 and 21, Abbey Row			1 July 1976	ST9318687350; 51°35′06″N 2°05′59″W		1269553	Numbers 19 and 21 and Attached Front Railings More images	Q26559659
Number 27 and Attached Ashlar Piers and Gates	II	27, Abbey Row			1 July 1976	ST9313787373; 51°35′07″N 2°06′02″W		1269555	Number 27 and Attached Ashlar Piers and Gates More images	Q26559660
29, Abbey Row	II	29, Abbey Row			1 July 1976	ST9312687380; 51°35′07″N 2°06′02″W		1269556	29, Abbey Row More images	Q26559661
Number 31 and Attached Front Area Gates and Railings	II	31, Abbey Row			1 July 1976	ST9312087382; 51°35′07″N 2°06′03″W		1269557	Number 31 and Attached Front Area Gates and Railings More images	Q26559662
33, Abbey Row	II	33, Abbey Row			1 July 1976	ST9311387385; 51°35′07″N 2°06′03″W		1269558	33, Abbey Row More images	Q26559663
66, Abbey Row	II	66, Abbey Row			1 July 1976	ST9310687371; 51°35′07″N 2°06′03″W		1269559	Upload Photo	Q26559664
68, Abbey Row	II	68, Abbey Row			1 July 1976	ST9310087373; 51°35′07″N 2°06′04″W		1269560	Upload Photo	Q26559665
70,72 And 74, Abbey Row	II	70, 72 and 74, Abbey Row			1 July 1976	ST9309387378; 51°35′07″N 2°06′04″W		1269561	Upload Photo	Q26559666
Numbers 33 and 35 and Attached Front Garden Wall	II	33 and 35, Blicks Hill			1 July 1976	ST9364187526; 51°35′12″N 2°05′35″W		1269523	Upload Photo	Q26559630
37, Blicks Hill	II	37, Blicks Hill			1 July 1976	ST9365287521; 51°35′11″N 2°05′35″W		1269524	Upload Photo	Q26559631
Chapel Wall Incorporated in Right Hand Wall of Numbers 19 and 21 (not Included)	II	Bristol Street			1 July 1976	ST9300787402; 51°35′08″N 2°06′08″W		1269534	Upload Photo	Q26559641
2, Bristol Street	II	2, Bristol Street			1 July 1976	ST9305087390; 51°35′07″N 2°06′06″W		1269525	2, Bristol Street More images	Q26559632
3 and 5, Bristol Street	II	3 and 5, Bristol Street			1 July 1976	ST9303687403; 51°35′08″N 2°06′07″W		1269526	3 and 5, Bristol Street More images	Q26559633
6 and 8, Bristol Street	II	6 and 8, Bristol Street			1 July 1976	ST9303287381; 51°35′07″N 2°06′07″W		1269527	6 and 8, Bristol Street More images	Q26559634
7 and 9, Bristol Street	II	7 and 9, Bristol Street			1 July 1976	ST9302887400; 51°35′07″N 2°06′07″W		1269528	7 and 9, Bristol Street More images	Q26559635
10 and 12, Bristol Street	II	10 and 12, Bristol Street			19 July 1996	ST9302187382; 51°35′07″N 2°06′08″W		1269529	10 and 12, Bristol Street More images	Q26559636
11 and 13, Bristol Street	II	11 and 13, Bristol Street			1 July 1976	ST9301987401; 51°35′08″N 2°06′08″W		1269530	11 and 13, Bristol Street More images	Q26559637
15 and 17, Bristol Street	II	15 and 17, Bristol Street			1 July 1976	ST9301187400; 51°35′07″N 2°06′08″W		1269531	15 and 17, Bristol Street More images	Q26559638
16, Bristol Street	II	16, Bristol Street			1 July 1976	ST9301487378; 51°35′07″N 2°06′08″W		1269532	16, Bristol Street More images	Q26559639
18,20 And 22, Bristol Street	II	18, 20 and 22, Bristol Street			1 July 1976	ST9300587373; 51°35′07″N 2°06′08″W		1269533	18,20 And 22, Bristol Street More images	Q26559640
23 Bristol Street	II*	23, Bristol Street			1 July 1976	ST9297787406; 51°35′08″N 2°06′10″W		1269535	Upload Photo	Q17545780
25,27 And 29, Bristol Street	II	25, 27 and 29, Bristol Street			1 July 1976	ST9296987408; 51°35′08″N 2°06′10″W		1269536	Upload Photo	Q26559642
32, Bristol Street	II	32, Bristol Street			1 July 1976	ST9299587378; 51°35′07″N 2°06′09″W		1269537	Upload Photo	Q26559643
34 and 36, Bristol Street	II	34 and 36, Bristol Street			1 July 1976	ST9299387384; 51°35′07″N 2°06′09″W		1269538	Upload Photo	Q26559644
40, Bristol Street	II	40, Bristol Street			1 July 1976	ST9298087383; 51°35′07″N 2°06′10″W		1269539	Upload Photo	Q26559645
42 and 44, Bristol Street	II	42 and 44, Bristol Street			1 July 1976	ST9296487373; 51°35′07″N 2°06′11″W		1269540	Upload Photo	Q26559646
46, Bristol Street	II	46, Bristol Street			1 July 1976	ST9294587378; 51°35′07″N 2°06′12″W		1269497	Upload Photo	Q26559606
48, Bristol Street	II	48, Bristol Street			19 July 1996	ST9293287366; 51°35′06″N 2°06′12″W		1269498	Upload Photo	Q26559607
50-56, Bristol Street	II	50-56, Bristol Street			1 July 1976	ST9290187350; 51°35′06″N 2°06′14″W		1269499	Upload Photo	Q26559608
Numbers 53 and 55 and Attached Railings and Raised Pavement	II	53 and 55, Bristol Street			1 July 1976	ST9288687371; 51°35′07″N 2°06′15″W		1269500	Upload Photo	Q26559609
58 and 60, Bristol Street	II	58 and 60, Bristol Street			1 July 1976	ST9289487344; 51°35′06″N 2°06′14″W		1269501	Upload Photo	Q26559610
62 and 64, Bristol Street	II	62 and 64, Bristol Street			1 July 1976	ST9289287342; 51°35′06″N 2°06′14″W		1269502	Upload Photo	Q26559611
66 and 68, Bristol Street	II	66 and 68, Bristol Street			1 July 1976	ST9288487336; 51°35′05″N 2°06′15″W		1269503	Upload Photo	Q26559612
5 and 7, Burnivale	II	5 and 7, Burnivale			1 July 1976	ST9306287359; 51°35′06″N 2°06′06″W		1269504	5 and 7, Burnivale More images	Q26559613
8 and 10, Burnivale	II	8 and 10, Burnivale			1 July 1976	ST9315287333; 51°35′05″N 2°06′01″W		1269505	8 and 10, Burnivale More images	Q26559614
9 and 11, Burnivale	II	9 and 11, Burnivale			1 July 1976	ST9307087354; 51°35′06″N 2°06′05″W		1269506	9 and 11, Burnivale More images	Q26559615
13,15,19 And 23, Burnivale	II	13, 15, 19 and 23, Burnivale			1 July 1976	ST9308887346; 51°35′06″N 2°06′04″W		1269507	13,15,19 And 23, Burnivale More images	Q26559616
25,27 And 29, Burnivale	II	25, 27 and 29, Burnivale			9 May 1975	ST9310487337; 51°35′05″N 2°06′03″W		1269508	25,27 And 29, Burnivale More images	Q26559617
53 and 55, Burnivale	II	53 and 55, Burnivale			19 July 1996	ST9319587262; 51°35′03″N 2°05′59″W		1269509	Upload Photo	Q26559618
Building at Rear of Number 12 High Street	II	Cross Hayes			1 July 1976	ST9335687180; 51°35′00″N 2°05′50″W		1269477	Building at Rear of Number 12 High Street More images	Q26559587
Building to Rear of Number 28 High Street (number 28 High Street Not Included)	II	Cross Hayes			1 July 1976	ST9336087118; 51°34′58″N 2°05′50″W		1269478	Building to Rear of Number 28 High Street (number 28 High Street Not Included) More images	Q26559588
Building to Rear of Number 30 High Street (not Included)	II	Cross Hayes			1 July 1976	ST9336287108; 51°34′58″N 2°05′50″W		1269479	Building to Rear of Number 30 High Street (not Included) More images	Q26559589
K6 Telephone Kiosk	II	Cross Hayes			2 February 1989	ST9336887102; 51°34′58″N 2°05′50″W		1269480	K6 Telephone Kiosk More images	Q26682919
Town Hall	II	Cross Hayes			23 March 1976	ST9338787198; 51°35′01″N 2°05′49″W		1269481	Town Hall More images	Q26559591
Gate Pier Approximately 5 Metres South of Number 22	II	Cross Hayes			1 July 1976	ST9340687155; 51°35′00″N 2°05′48″W		1269512	Gate Pier Approximately 5 Metres South of Number 22 More images	Q26559621
Cross Hayes House And Attached Wall, Railings And Gate Posts	II*	28, Cross Hayes			18 January 1949	ST9341687123; 51°34′59″N 2°05′47″W		1269514	Cross Hayes House And Attached Wall, Railings And Gate Posts More images	Q17544400
14 and 16, Cross Hayes	II	14 and 16, Cross Hayes			1 July 1976	ST9341187186; 51°35′01″N 2°05′47″W		1269510	14 and 16, Cross Hayes More images	Q26559619
22, Cross Hayes	II	22, Cross Hayes			1 July 1976	ST9341287163; 51°35′00″N 2°05′47″W		1269511	22, Cross Hayes More images	Q26559620
St Aldhelms Presbytery	II	26, Cross Hayes			1 July 1976	ST9341387131; 51°34′59″N 2°05′47″W		1269513	St Aldhelms Presbytery More images	Q26559622
30, Cross Hayes	II	30, Cross Hayes			18 January 1949	ST9341587112; 51°34′58″N 2°05′47″W		1269515	30, Cross Hayes More images	Q26559623
Number 32 and Attached Rear Store	II	32, Cross Hayes			18 January 1949	ST9340287096; 51°34′58″N 2°05′48″W		1269516	Number 32 and Attached Rear Store More images	Q26559624
34, Cross Hayes	II	34, Cross Hayes			1 July 1976	ST9339587093; 51°34′58″N 2°05′48″W		1269517	34, Cross Hayes More images	Q26559625
36, Cross Hayes	II	36, Cross Hayes			1 July 1976	ST9338887092; 51°34′58″N 2°05′49″W		1269518	36, Cross Hayes More images	Q26559626
38, Cross Hayes	II	38, Cross Hayes			1 July 1976	ST9338087091; 51°34′57″N 2°05′49″W		1269475	38, Cross Hayes More images	Q26559585
40 and 42, Cross Hayes	II	40 and 42, Cross Hayes			1 July 1976	ST9337387089; 51°34′57″N 2°05′49″W		1269476	40 and 42, Cross Hayes More images	Q26559586
Store Attached to South of Number 12	II	Cross Hayes Lane			1 July 1976	ST9341487196; 51°35′01″N 2°05′47″W		1269486	Store Attached to South of Number 12 More images	Q26559596
2 and 4, Cross Hayes Lane	II	2 and 4, Cross Hayes Lane			1 July 1976	ST9342587221; 51°35′02″N 2°05′47″W		1269482	2 and 4, Cross Hayes Lane More images	Q26559592
6 and 8, Cross Hayes Lane	II	6 and 8, Cross Hayes Lane			18 January 1949	ST9342487213; 51°35′01″N 2°05′47″W		1269483	6 and 8, Cross Hayes Lane More images	Q26559593
10, Cross Hayes Lane	II	10, Cross Hayes Lane			1 July 1976	ST9341887206; 51°35′01″N 2°05′47″W		1269484	10, Cross Hayes Lane More images	Q26559594
12, Cross Hayes Road	II	12, Cross Hayes Road			1 July 1976	ST9341587201; 51°35′01″N 2°05′47″W		1269485	12, Cross Hayes Road More images	Q26559595
23, Culver Gardens	II	23, Culver Gardens			1 July 1976	ST9348787020; 51°34′55″N 2°05′43″W		1269488	23, Culver Gardens More images	Q26559597
50 and 52, Foundary Road	II	50 and 52, Foundary Road			1 July 1976	ST9301287587; 51°35′14″N 2°06′08″W		1269492	Upload Photo	Q26559601
Westport Foundry And Attached Iron Railngs, Piers And Gates	II	Foundry Road			1 July 1976	ST9300187627; 51°35′15″N 2°06′09″W		1269493	Upload Photo	Q26559602
41 and 43, Foundry Road	II	41 and 43, Foundry Road			1 July 1976	ST9303287544; 51°35′12″N 2°06′07″W		1269489	Upload Photo	Q26559598
42-48, Foundry Road	II	42-48, Foundry Road			1 July 1976	ST9301387573; 51°35′13″N 2°06′08″W		1269490	Upload Photo	Q26559599
45 and 47, Foundry Road	II	45 and 47, Foundry Road			1 July 1976	ST9301687605; 51°35′14″N 2°06′08″W		1269491	Upload Photo	Q26559600
2, Foxley Road	II	2, Foxley Road			1 July 1976	ST9287287333; 51°35′05″N 2°06′15″W		1269494	Upload Photo	Q26559603
4 and 8, Foxley Road	II	4 and 8, Foxley Road			1 July 1976	ST9287287327; 51°35′05″N 2°06′15″W		1269495	Upload Photo	Q26559604
10, Foxley Road	II	10, Foxley Road			1 July 1976	ST9285787300; 51°35′04″N 2°06′16″W		1269496	Upload Photo	Q26559605
12, Foxley Road	II	12, Foxley Road			1 July 1976	ST9283487299; 51°35′04″N 2°06′17″W		1269453	Upload Photo	Q26559563
2-12, Gastons Road	II	2-12, Gastons Road			1 July 1976	ST9279187419; 51°35′08″N 2°06′20″W		1269454	Upload Photo	Q26559564
3 and 5, Gastons Road	II	3 and 5, Gastons Road			1 July 1976	ST9281087419; 51°35′08″N 2°06′19″W		1269455	Upload Photo	Q26559565
Walls, Railings And Overthrow To Front Of Number 116 (Westport House)	II	Railings And Overthrow To Front Of Number 116 (westport House), Gloucester Road			1 July 1976	ST9306987596; 51°35′14″N 2°06′05″W		1269443	Upload Photo	Q26559555
K6 Telephone Kiosk	II	Gloucester Road			16 March 1992	ST9306887429; 51°35′08″N 2°06′05″W		1269445	K6 Telephone Kiosk More images	Q26559557
The Three Cups Public House	II	Gloucester Road			1 July 1976	ST9306587438; 51°35′09″N 2°06′05″W		1269446	The Three Cups Public House More images	Q26559558
45 and 47, Gloucester Road	II	45 and 47, Gloucester Road			18 January 1949	ST9308787417; 51°35′08″N 2°06′04″W		1269456	45 and 47, Gloucester Road More images	Q26559566
49, Gloucester Road	II	49, Gloucester Road			18 January 1949	ST9308687426; 51°35′08″N 2°06′04″W		1269457	49, Gloucester Road More images	Q26559567
53, Gloucester Road	II	53, Gloucester Road			1 July 1976	ST9309287437; 51°35′09″N 2°06′04″W		1269458	53, Gloucester Road More images	Q26559568
55, Gloucester Road	II	55, Gloucester Road			1 July 1976	ST9309487442; 51°35′09″N 2°06′04″W		1269459	55, Gloucester Road More images	Q26559569
57, Gloucester Road	II	57, Gloucester Road			1 July 1976	ST9309687448; 51°35′09″N 2°06′04″W		1269460	57, Gloucester Road More images	Q26559570
59 and 61, Gloucester Road	II	59 and 61, Gloucester Road			1 July 1976	ST9309987456; 51°35′09″N 2°06′04″W		1269461	59 and 61, Gloucester Road More images	Q26559571
63, Gloucester Road	II	63, Gloucester Road			1 July 1976	ST9310587464; 51°35′10″N 2°06′03″W		1269462	63, Gloucester Road More images	Q26559572
65 and 67, Gloucester Road	II	65 and 67, Gloucester Road			1 July 1976	ST9310787476; 51°35′10″N 2°06′03″W		1269463	65 and 67, Gloucester Road More images	Q26559573
69, Gloucester Road	II	69, Gloucester Road			1 July 1976	ST9311187483; 51°35′10″N 2°06′03″W		1269464	69, Gloucester Road More images	Q26559574
75 and 77, Gloucester Road	II	75 and 77, Gloucester Road			1 July 1976	ST9311387499; 51°35′11″N 2°06′03″W		1269465	75 and 77, Gloucester Road More images	Q26559575
78, Gloucester Road	II	78, Gloucester Road			1 July 1976	ST9307787389; 51°35′07″N 2°06′05″W		1269466	Upload Photo	Q26559576
79, Gloucester Road	II	79, Gloucester Road			1 July 1976	ST9311487506; 51°35′11″N 2°06′03″W		1269467	79, Gloucester Road More images	Q26559577
80, Gloucester Road	II	80, Gloucester Road			1 July 1976	ST9307087392; 51°35′07″N 2°06′05″W		1269468	Upload Photo	Q26559578
84 and 84a, Gloucester Road	II	84 and 84a, Gloucester Road			1 July 1976	ST9305287409; 51°35′08″N 2°06′06″W		1269469	84 and 84a, Gloucester Road More images	Q26559579
87a, Gloucester Road	II	87a, Gloucester Road			1 July 1976	ST9310387541; 51°35′12″N 2°06′03″W		1269471	87a, Gloucester Road More images	Q26559581
88, Gloucester Road (See Details For Further Address Information)	II	88, Gloucester Road			1 July 1976	ST9306087422; 51°35′08″N 2°06′06″W		1269472	88, Gloucester Road (See Details For Further Address Information) More images	Q26559582
89, Gloucester Road	II	89, Gloucester Road			1 July 1976	ST9309887552; 51°35′12″N 2°06′04″W		1269473	89, Gloucester Road More images	Q26559583
93, Gloucester Road	II	93, Gloucester Road			1 July 1976	ST9309487562; 51°35′13″N 2°06′04″W		1269474	93, Gloucester Road More images	Q26559584
Numbers 95 and 97 and Attached Sunken Front Area Railings	II	95 and 97, Gloucester Road			1 July 1976	ST9308887578; 51°35′13″N 2°06′04″W		1269432	Numbers 95 and 97 and Attached Sunken Front Area Railings More images	Q26559544
Number 96 and Attached Former Barn	II	96, Gloucester Road			1 July 1976	ST9309687501; 51°35′11″N 2°06′04″W		1269433	Number 96 and Attached Former Barn More images	Q26559545
Claremont and Attached Front Area Railings	II	98, Gloucester Road			1 July 1976	ST9309787507; 51°35′11″N 2°06′04″W		1269434	Upload Photo	Q26559546
Braxted and Attached Front Walls and Piers	II	99, Gloucester Road			1 July 1976	ST9308087615; 51°35′14″N 2°06′05″W		1269435	Upload Photo	Q26559547
100, Gloucester Road	II	100, Gloucester Road			1 July 1976	ST9309487516; 51°35′11″N 2°06′04″W		1269436	100, Gloucester Road More images	Q26559548
Numbers 103 and 105 and Attached Front Walls and Railings	II	103 and 105, Gloucester Road			1 July 1976	ST9308787679; 51°35′17″N 2°06′04″W		1269437	Upload Photo	Q26559549
104 and 106, Gloucester Road	II	104 and 106, Gloucester Road			1 July 1976	ST9309287527; 51°35′12″N 2°06′04″W		1269438	104 and 106, Gloucester Road More images	Q26559550
108, Gloucester Road	II	108, Gloucester Road			19 July 1996	ST9308987535; 51°35′12″N 2°06′04″W		1269439	108, Gloucester Road More images	Q26559551
110, Gloucester Road	II	110, Gloucester Road			1 July 1976	ST9308687542; 51°35′12″N 2°06′04″W		1269440	110, Gloucester Road More images	Q26559552
112, Gloucester Road	II	112, Gloucester Road			1 July 1976	ST9308187552; 51°35′12″N 2°06′05″W		1269441	112, Gloucester Road More images	Q26559553
Westport House	II	116, Gloucester Road			1 July 1976	ST9306087588; 51°35′14″N 2°06′06″W		1269442	Westport House More images	Q26559554
118 and 118b, Gloucester Road	II	118 and 118b, Gloucester Road			1 July 1976	ST9306087641; 51°35′15″N 2°06′06″W		1269444	Upload Photo	Q26559556
St Pauls Bell Tower	I	Gloucester Street			18 January 1949	ST9325287237; 51°35′02″N 2°05′56″W		1269428	St Pauls Bell Tower More images	Q17529829
Walls, Piers And Iron Railings Enclosing West Side Of The Abbey Church Graveyard Walls, Piers And Railings Round Abbey Church Graveyard	II	Gloucester Street			19 July 1996	ST9324887253; 51°35′03″N 2°05′56″W		1269429	Upload Photo	Q26559541
1, Gloucester Street	II	1, Gloucester Street			1 July 1976	ST9328787226; 51°35′02″N 2°05′54″W		1269447	1, Gloucester Street More images	Q26559559
2, Gloucester Street	II	2, Gloucester Street			1 July 1976	ST9329587213; 51°35′01″N 2°05′53″W		1269448	2, Gloucester Street More images	Q26559560
Numbers 3 and 5 and Attached Wall	II*	3 and 5, Gloucester Street			1 July 1976	ST9327887225; 51°35′02″N 2°05′54″W		1269449	Numbers 3 and 5 and Attached Wall More images	Q17544388
4, Gloucester Street	II	4, Gloucester Street			1 July 1976	ST9329187213; 51°35′01″N 2°05′54″W		1269450	4, Gloucester Street More images	Q26559561
6, Gloucester Street	II	6, Gloucester Street			1 July 1976	ST9328787212; 51°35′01″N 2°05′54″W		1269451	6, Gloucester Street More images	Q26559562
8, Gloucester Street	II*	8, Gloucester Street			18 January 1949	ST9327487209; 51°35′01″N 2°05′54″W		1269452	8, Gloucester Street More images	Q17544393
Number 11 and Attached Front Railings and Gate	II	11, Gloucester Street			1 July 1976	ST9325487229; 51°35′02″N 2°05′56″W		1269411	Number 11 and Attached Front Railings and Gate More images	Q26559524
Number 12 and Attached Front Area Railings	II	12, Gloucester Street			1 July 1976	ST9325487205; 51°35′01″N 2°05′56″W		1269412	Number 12 and Attached Front Area Railings More images	Q26559525
Outbuilding Of Number 12	II	14, Gloucester Street			1 July 1976	ST9324087207; 51°35′01″N 2°05′56″W		1269413	Upload Photo	Q26559526
18 and 20, Gloucester Street	II	18 and 20, Gloucester Street			1 July 1976	ST9324087223; 51°35′02″N 2°05′56″W		1269414	18 and 20, Gloucester Street More images	Q26559527
22, Gloucester Street	II	22, Gloucester Street			1 July 1976	ST9323987230; 51°35′02″N 2°05′56″W		1269415	22, Gloucester Street More images	Q26559528
24, Gloucester Street	II	24, Gloucester Street			1 July 1976	ST9324087235; 51°35′02″N 2°05′56″W		1269416	24, Gloucester Street More images	Q26559529
26, Gloucester Street	II	26, Gloucester Street			1 July 1976	ST9323587238; 51°35′02″N 2°05′57″W		1269417	26, Gloucester Street More images	Q26559530
28 and 30, Gloucester Street	II	28 and 30, Gloucester Street			1 July 1976	ST9322987232; 51°35′02″N 2°05′57″W		1269418	Upload Photo	Q26559531
32 and 34, Gloucester Street	II	32 and 34, Gloucester Street			19 July 1996	ST9323587251; 51°35′03″N 2°05′57″W		1269419	32 and 34, Gloucester Street More images	Q26559532
38, Gloucester Street	II	38, Gloucester Street			1 July 1976	ST9322987265; 51°35′03″N 2°05′57″W		1269420	38, Gloucester Street More images	Q26559533
40, Gloucester Street	II	40, Gloucester Street			1 July 1976	ST9322887274; 51°35′03″N 2°05′57″W		1269421	40, Gloucester Street More images	Q26559534
Numbers 42 and 44 Including St Aldhelms Well	II	42 and 44, Gloucester Street			18 January 1949	ST9322587281; 51°35′04″N 2°05′57″W		1269422	Numbers 42 and 44 Including St Aldhelms Well More images	Q26559535
46 and 46a, Gloucester Street	II	46 and 46a, Gloucester Street			1 July 1976	ST9322287293; 51°35′04″N 2°05′57″W		1269423	46 and 46a, Gloucester Street More images	Q26559536
48, Gloucester Street	II	48, Gloucester Street			18 January 1949	ST9321787303; 51°35′04″N 2°05′57″W		1269424	48, Gloucester Street More images	Q26559537
50, Gloucester Street	II	50, Gloucester Street			18 January 1949	ST9321287309; 51°35′05″N 2°05′58″W		1269425	50, Gloucester Street More images	Q26559538
54, Gloucester Street	II	54, Gloucester Street			1 July 1976	ST9320287319; 51°35′05″N 2°05′58″W		1269426	54, Gloucester Street More images	Q26559539
56, Gloucester Street	II	56, Gloucester Street			1 July 1976	ST9319887322; 51°35′05″N 2°05′58″W		1269427	56, Gloucester Street More images	Q26559540
Former Town Wall Attached to East Corner of Number 72	II	High Street			1 July 1976	ST9341386953; 51°34′53″N 2°05′47″W		1269348	Former Town Wall Attached to East Corner of Number 72 More images	Q26559462
1, High Street	II	1, High Street			1 July 1976	ST9329987213; 51°35′01″N 2°05′53″W		1269430	1, High Street More images	Q26559542
2 And 4 High Street, Including The Former 1 Oxford Street And 1A Oxford Street	II	2 and 4, High Street			1 July 1976	ST9332287211; 51°35′01″N 2°05′52″W		1269431	2 And 4 High Street, Including The Former 1 Oxford Street And 1A Oxford Street More images	Q26559543
3, High Street	II	3, High Street			1 July 1976	ST9329387208; 51°35′01″N 2°05′54″W		1269390	3, High Street More images	Q26559503
5, High Street	II	5, High Street			1 July 1976	ST9329487203; 51°35′01″N 2°05′53″W		1269391	5, High Street More images	Q26559504
7, High Street	II	7, High Street			1 July 1976	ST9329687197; 51°35′01″N 2°05′53″W		1269392	Upload Photo	Q26559505
9 and 11, High Street	II	9 and 11, High Street			1 July 1976	ST9329787187; 51°35′01″N 2°05′53″W		1269393	9 and 11, High Street More images	Q26559506
10, High Street	II	10, High Street			18 January 1949	ST9332187181; 51°35′00″N 2°05′52″W		1269394	10, High Street More images	Q26559507
12, High Street	II	12, High Street			1 July 1976	ST9332087173; 51°35′00″N 2°05′52″W		1269395	12, High Street More images	Q26559508
13 and 15, High Street	II	13 and 15, High Street			1 July 1976	ST9329887178; 51°35′00″N 2°05′53″W		1269396	13 and 15, High Street More images	Q26559509
14, High Street	II	14, High Street			1 July 1976	ST9332387167; 51°35′00″N 2°05′52″W		1269397	14, High Street More images	Q26559510
16 and 18, High Street	II	16 and 18, High Street			1 July 1976	ST9332387159; 51°35′00″N 2°05′52″W		1269398	16 and 18, High Street More images	Q26559511
19, High Street	II	19, High Street			1 July 1976	ST9330087155; 51°35′00″N 2°05′53″W		1269399	19, High Street More images	Q26559512
20, High Street	II	20, High Street			29 January 1971	ST9332587145; 51°34′59″N 2°05′52″W		1269400	20, High Street More images	Q26559513
21, High Street	II	21, High Street			1 July 1976	ST9329987150; 51°34′59″N 2°05′53″W		1269401	21, High Street More images	Q26559514
24, High Street	II	24, High Street			1 July 1976	ST9332987129; 51°34′59″N 2°05′52″W		1269402	24, High Street More images	Q26559515
25 and 27, High Street	II	25 and 27, High Street			1 July 1976	ST9330287134; 51°34′59″N 2°05′53″W		1269403	25 and 27, High Street More images	Q26559516
26, High Street	II	26, High Street			1 July 1976	ST9333587122; 51°34′58″N 2°05′51″W		1269404	26, High Street More images	Q26559517
The Kings Arms Hotel	II	29, High Street			18 January 1949	ST9330787116; 51°34′58″N 2°05′53″W		1269405	The Kings Arms Hotel More images	Q26559518
36 and 38, High Street	II	36 and 38, High Street			18 January 1949	ST9334487077; 51°34′57″N 2°05′51″W		1269406	36 and 38, High Street More images	Q26559519
37, High Street	II	37, High Street			18 January 1949	ST9331887082; 51°34′57″N 2°05′52″W		1269407	37, High Street More images	Q26559520
39, High Street	II	39, High Street			18 January 1949	ST9332087075; 51°34′57″N 2°05′52″W		1269408	39, High Street More images	Q26559521
40 and 42 High Street	II	40 and 42 High Street, SN16 9AT			1 July 1976	ST9335387065; 51°34′57″N 2°05′50″W		1269409	40 and 42 High Street More images	Q26559522
Gazebo at Rear of Number 43	II	High Street			1 July 1976	ST9327387031; 51°34′56″N 2°05′55″W		1269369	Upload Photo	Q26559482
43 and 43a, High Street	II	43 and 43a, High Street			1 July 1976	ST9333087049; 51°34′56″N 2°05′52″W		1269410	43 and 43a, High Street More images	Q26559523
45, High Street	II	45, High Street			1 July 1976	ST9333587042; 51°34′56″N 2°05′51″W		1269370	Upload Photo	Q26559483
46, High Street	II	46, High Street			18 January 1949	ST9335787045; 51°34′56″N 2°05′50″W		1269371	46, High Street More images	Q26559484
47 and 49, High Street	II	47 and 49, High Street			1 July 1976	ST9333887034; 51°34′56″N 2°05′51″W		1269372	47 and 49, High Street More images	Q26559485
48 and 50, High Street	II	48 and 50, High Street			1 July 1976	ST9336787026; 51°34′55″N 2°05′50″W		1269373	48 and 50, High Street More images	Q26559486
51, High Street	II	51, High Street			1 July 1976	ST9334087024; 51°34′55″N 2°05′51″W		1269374	51, High Street More images	Q26559487
52, High Street	II	52, High Street			1 July 1976	ST9337487011; 51°34′55″N 2°05′49″W		1269375	52, High Street More images	Q26559488
53, High Street	II	53, High Street			1 July 1976	ST9334687012; 51°34′55″N 2°05′51″W		1269376	53, High Street More images	Q26559489
54, High Street	II	54, High Street			1 July 1976	ST9337887003; 51°34′55″N 2°05′49″W		1269377	54, High Street More images	Q26559490
55 and 57, High Street	II	55 and 57, High Street			18 January 1949	ST9334987005; 51°34′55″N 2°05′51″W		1269378	55 and 57, High Street More images	Q26559491
56, High Street	II	56, High Street			1 July 1976	ST9337986998; 51°34′54″N 2°05′49″W		1269379	56, High Street More images	Q26559492
58, High Street	II	58, High Street			1 July 1976	ST9338186992; 51°34′54″N 2°05′49″W		1269380	58, High Street More images	Q26559493
59, High Street	II	59, High Street			1 July 1976	ST9335286996; 51°34′54″N 2°05′50″W		1269381	59, High Street More images	Q26559494
60, High Street	II	60, High Street			1 July 1976	ST9338486981; 51°34′54″N 2°05′49″W		1269382	60, High Street More images	Q26559495
61, High Street	II	61, High Street			1 July 1976	ST9335886987; 51°34′54″N 2°05′50″W		1269383	61, High Street More images	Q26559496
62 and 64, High Street	II	62 and 64, High Street			1 July 1976	ST9338686972; 51°34′54″N 2°05′49″W		1269384	62 and 64, High Street More images	Q26559497
Apsley House	II	63, High Street			18 January 1949	ST9336286978; 51°34′54″N 2°05′50″W		1269385	Apsley House More images	Q26559498
65, High Street	II	65, High Street			1 July 1976	ST9336686970; 51°34′54″N 2°05′50″W		1269386	65, High Street More images	Q26559499
66, High Street	II	66, High Street			1 July 1976	ST9339086965; 51°34′53″N 2°05′48″W		1269387	66, High Street More images	Q26559500
67 and 69, High Street	II	67 and 69, High Street			1 July 1976	ST9336986960; 51°34′53″N 2°05′50″W		1269388	67 and 69, High Street More images	Q26559501
70 and 72, High Street	II	70 and 72, High Street			1 July 1976	ST9339586950; 51°34′53″N 2°05′48″W		1269389	70 and 72, High Street More images	Q26559502
71, High Street	II	71, High Street			1 July 1976	ST9337186954; 51°34′53″N 2°05′49″W		1269349	71, High Street More images	Q26559463
73, High Street	II	73, High Street			1 July 1976	ST9337386947; 51°34′53″N 2°05′49″W		1269350	73, High Street More images	Q26559464
74, High Street	II	74, High Street			1 July 1976	ST9340286943; 51°34′53″N 2°05′48″W		1269351	74, High Street More images	Q26559465
75, High Street	II	75, High Street			1 July 1976	ST9337586941; 51°34′53″N 2°05′49″W		1269352	75, High Street More images	Q26559466
76 and 78, High Street	II	76 and 78, High Street			1 July 1976	ST9340686939; 51°34′53″N 2°05′48″W		1269353	76 and 78, High Street More images	Q26559467
77, High Street	II	77, High Street			1 July 1976	ST9337686937; 51°34′53″N 2°05′49″W		1269354	77, High Street More images	Q26559468
79, High Street	II	79, High Street			1 July 1976	ST9338886918; 51°34′52″N 2°05′49″W		1269355	Upload Photo	Q26559469
80 and 82, High Street	II	80 and 82, High Street			1 July 1976	ST9341586935; 51°34′52″N 2°05′47″W		1269356	80 and 82, High Street More images	Q26559470
81, High Street	II	81, High Street			1 July 1976	ST9339386918; 51°34′52″N 2°05′48″W		1269357	Upload Photo	Q26559471
83, High Street	II	83, High Street			1 July 1976	ST9339886918; 51°34′52″N 2°05′48″W		1269358	Upload Photo	Q26559472
84, High Street	II	84, High Street			1 July 1976	ST9342386935; 51°34′52″N 2°05′47″W		1269359	84, High Street More images	Q26559473
85, High Street	II	85, High Street			1 July 1976	ST9340486920; 51°34′52″N 2°05′48″W		1269360	85, High Street More images	Q26559474
87-93, High Street	II	87-93, High Street			6 August 1974	ST9341186918; 51°34′52″N 2°05′47″W		1269361	87-93, High Street More images	Q26559475
92, High Street	II*	92, High Street			18 January 1949	ST9344586935; 51°34′52″N 2°05′46″W		1269362	92, High Street More images	Q17544380
94, High Street	II	94, High Street			1 July 1976	ST9345586935; 51°34′52″N 2°05′45″W		1269363	94, High Street More images	Q26559476
95 and 97, High Street	II	95 and 97, High Street			6 August 1974	ST9342886916; 51°34′52″N 2°05′46″W		1269364	95 and 97, High Street More images	Q26559477
96,98 And 100, High Street	II	96, 98 and 100, High Street			1 July 1976	ST9347086937; 51°34′53″N 2°05′44″W		1269365	96,98 And 100, High Street More images	Q26559478
The Rose And Crown Public House	II	102, High Street			1 July 1976	ST9348586943; 51°34′53″N 2°05′44″W		1269366	The Rose And Crown Public House More images	Q26559479
103, High Street	II	103, High Street			6 August 1974	ST9343686915; 51°34′52″N 2°05′46″W		1269367	103, High Street More images	Q26559480
107, 113 and 115, High Street	II	107, 113 and 115, High Street, SN16 9AL			6 August 1974	ST9343986915; 51°34′52″N 2°05′46″W		1269368	107, 113 and 115, High Street More images	Q26559481
117-123, High Street	II	117-123, High Street			6 August 1974	ST9345786915; 51°34′52″N 2°05′45″W		1269327	117-123, High Street More images	Q26559441
125, High Street	II	125, High Street			6 August 1974	ST9346786918; 51°34′52″N 2°05′44″W		1269328	125, High Street More images	Q26559442
133, High Street	II	133, High Street			6 August 1974	ST9348086918; 51°34′52″N 2°05′44″W		1269329	133, High Street More images	Q26559443
135 and 137, High Street	II	135 and 137, High Street			6 August 1974	ST9348686922; 51°34′52″N 2°05′43″W		1269330	135 and 137, High Street More images	Q26559444
The Retreat	II	Holloway Hill			1 July 1976	ST9345587380; 51°35′07″N 2°05′45″W		1269335	Upload Photo	Q26559449
Wall Attached to North East Corner of the Retreat	II	Holloway Hill			1 July 1976	ST9348987388; 51°35′07″N 2°05′43″W		1269336	Upload Photo	Q26559450
Whychurch Farmhouse	II	Holloway Hill			24 July 1992	ST9384587963; 51°35′26″N 2°05′25″W		1269337	Upload Photo	Q26559451
Outbuilding to West North West of Whychurch Farmhouse	II	Holloway Hill			24 July 1992	ST9381487986; 51°35′26″N 2°05′26″W		1269338	Upload Photo	Q26559452
23 and 25, Holloway Hill	II	23 and 25, Holloway Hill			1 July 1976	ST9343787301; 51°35′04″N 2°05′46″W		1269331	23 and 25, Holloway Hill More images	Q26559445
27, Holloway Hill	II	27, Holloway Hill			1 July 1976	ST9344987301; 51°35′04″N 2°05′45″W		1269332	27, Holloway Hill More images	Q26559446
29, Holloway Hill	II	29, Holloway Hill			1 July 1976	ST9345687302; 51°35′04″N 2°05′45″W		1269333	29, Holloway Hill More images	Q26559447
31, Holloway Hill	II	31, Holloway Hill			1 July 1976	ST9346187299; 51°35′04″N 2°05′45″W		1269334	31, Holloway Hill More images	Q26559448
18, Horsefair	II	18, Horsefair			18 January 1949	ST9303587494; 51°35′11″N 2°06′07″W		1269339	Upload Photo	Q26559453
22, Horsefair	II	22, Horsefair			1 July 1976	ST9300887493; 51°35′10″N 2°06′08″W		1269340	Upload Photo	Q26559454
23, Horsefair	II	23, Horsefair			4 March 1976	ST9304887506; 51°35′11″N 2°06′06″W		1269341	Upload Photo	Q26559455
24 and 26, Horsefair	II	24 and 26, Horsefair			1 July 1976	ST9299787506; 51°35′11″N 2°06′09″W		1269342	Upload Photo	Q26559456
25 and 27, Horsefair	II	25 and 27, Horsefair			4 March 1976	ST9304587513; 51°35′11″N 2°06′06″W		1269343	Upload Photo	Q26559457
29, Horsefair	II	29, Horsefair			4 March 1976	ST9304287519; 51°35′11″N 2°06′07″W		1269344	Upload Photo	Q26559458
30 and 34-38, Horsefair	II	30 and 34-38, Horsefair			18 January 1949	ST9300387527; 51°35′12″N 2°06′09″W		1269345	Upload Photo	Q26559459
33, Horsefair	II	33, Horsefair			1 July 1976	ST9303887529; 51°35′12″N 2°06′07″W		1269346	Upload Photo	Q26559460
35,37 And 39, Horsefair	II	35, 37 and 39, Horsefair			1 July 1976	ST9303387535; 51°35′12″N 2°06′07″W		1269347	Upload Photo	Q26559461
40, Horsefair	II	40, Horsefair			1 July 1976	ST9301887544; 51°35′12″N 2°06′08″W		1269306	Upload Photo	Q26559423
2 ,4 And 6, Ingram Street	II	2,4 And 6, Ingram Street			1 July 1976	ST9338987036; 51°34′56″N 2°05′49″W		1269307	2 ,4 And 6, Ingram Street More images	Q26559424
8, 10 And 12, Ingram Street	II	8,10 And 12, Ingram Street			1 July 1976	ST9341087047; 51°34′56″N 2°05′47″W		1269308	Upload Photo	Q26559425
Culver House	II*	15-23, Ingram Street			18 January 1949	ST9347686995; 51°34′54″N 2°05′44″W		1269487	Upload Photo	Q17544395
2, 8 And 10, Kings Wall	II	2, 8 And 10, Kings Wall			18 January 1949	ST9337586924; 51°34′52″N 2°05′49″W		1269309	2, 8 And 10, Kings Wall More images	Q26559426
16 And 20, Kings Wall	II	16 And 20, Kings Wall			1 July 1976	ST9335586927; 51°34′52″N 2°05′50″W		1269310	16 And 20, Kings Wall More images	Q26559427
24 and 26, Kings Wall	II	24 and 26, Kings Wall			1 July 1976	ST9334286929; 51°34′52″N 2°05′51″W		1269311	24 and 26, Kings Wall More images	Q26559428
Kings House and Attached Garden and Front Terrace Walls and Railings	II*	34 and 38, Kings Wall			18 January 1949	ST9327286977; 51°34′54″N 2°05′55″W		1269312	Upload Photo	Q17544373
Arch in Garden to South of Abbey House	II*	Market Cross			1 July 1976	ST9334787345; 51°35′06″N 2°05′51″W		1269285	Upload Photo	Q17544351
Garden Walls and Gates Attached to South East Corner and Extending South of Abbey House	II	Market Cross			1 July 1976	ST9336787332; 51°35′05″N 2°05′50″W		1269286	Upload Photo	Q26559407
Garden Walls Extending to East of North East Corner of Abbey House	II	Market Cross			1 July 1976	ST9341687384; 51°35′07″N 2°05′47″W		1269287	Upload Photo	Q26559408
Old Brewery	II	Market Cross			18 January 1949	ST9334887268; 51°35′03″N 2°05′51″W		1269288	Upload Photo	Q26559409
Old Brewery House And Attached Gateway, Walls, Piers And Railings	II*	Market Cross			18 January 1949	ST9334887290; 51°35′04″N 2°05′51″W		1269289	Old Brewery House And Attached Gateway, Walls, Piers And Railings More images	Q17544356
St Michaels House	II	Market Cross			18 January 1949	ST9331887292; 51°35′04″N 2°05′52″W		1269290	St Michaels House More images	Q26559410
The Cross	I	Market Cross			18 January 1949	ST9330287228; 51°35′02″N 2°05′53″W		1269291	The Cross More images	Q6744367
Abbey Church of St Mary and St Aldhelm	I	Market Cross			18 January 1949	ST9328087320; 51°35′05″N 2°05′54″W		1269316	Abbey Church of St Mary and St Aldhelm More images	Q550064
Chest Tomb Approximately 1 Metre South of Abbey Church	II	Market Cross			19 July 1996	ST9328387303; 51°35′04″N 2°05′54″W		1269317	Chest Tomb Approximately 1 Metre South of Abbey Church More images	Q26559432
Chest Tomb Approximately 1 Metre West of Porch of Abbey Church	II	Market Cross			19 July 1996	ST9326087301; 51°35′04″N 2°05′55″W		1269318	Upload Photo	Q26559433
Chest Tomb Approximately 20 Metres South West of Porch of Abbey Church	II	Market Cross			19 July 1996	ST9325487286; 51°35′04″N 2°05′56″W		1269319	Upload Photo	Q26559434
Gateway to Churchyard of St Mary and St Aldhelms Abbey Church	II	Market Cross			18 January 1949	ST9328487241; 51°35′02″N 2°05′54″W		1269320	Gateway to Churchyard of St Mary and St Aldhelms Abbey Church More images	Q26559435
Group of 3 Chest Tombs Approximately 40 Metres South of Abbey Church	II	Market Cross			19 July 1996	ST9328587275; 51°35′03″N 2°05′54″W		1269321	Group of 3 Chest Tombs Approximately 40 Metres South of Abbey Church More images	Q26559436
Group 6 of Chest Tombs Approximately 20 Metres South of Abbey Church	II	Market Cross			19 July 1996	ST9329087293; 51°35′04″N 2°05′54″W		1269322	Group 6 of Chest Tombs Approximately 20 Metres South of Abbey Church More images	Q26559437
Headstone of Hannah Twynnoy Approximately 40 Metres South of East End of Abbey Church	II	Market Cross			1 July 1976	ST9329387269; 51°35′03″N 2°05′54″W		1269323	Upload Photo	Q26559438
Headstone of Wf Cooper Approximately 40 Metres South of Abbey Church	II	Market Cross			1 July 1976	ST9328087271; 51°35′03″N 2°05′54″W		1269324	Upload Photo	Q26559439
Abbey House and Attached Rear Wall	I	Market Cross			18 January 1949	ST9334087379; 51°35′07″N 2°05′51″W		1269325	Abbey House and Attached Rear Wall More images	Q85337030
Abbey House Water Tower	II	Market Cross			1 July 1976	ST9336287306; 51°35′04″N 2°05′50″W		1269326	Abbey House Water Tower More images	Q26559440
1 and 3, Market Cross	II	1 and 3, Market Cross			19 July 1996	ST9332287234; 51°35′02″N 2°05′52″W		1269313	1 and 3, Market Cross More images	Q26559429
Number 4 and Attached Wall and Pier	II	4, Market Cross			1 July 1976	ST9328587230; 51°35′02″N 2°05′54″W		1269314	Number 4 and Attached Wall and Pier More images	Q26559430
The Apostles and Attached Rear Rubble Wall	II	6, Market Cross			18 January 1949	ST9329187249; 51°35′03″N 2°05′54″W		1269315	The Apostles and Attached Rear Rubble Wall More images	Q26559431
Stone Mounting Block Approximately 1 Metre South of Number 1	II	Market Lane			1 July 1976	ST9336487196; 51°35′01″N 2°05′50″W		1269293	Upload Photo	Q26559412
1, Market Lane	II	1, Market Lane			1 July 1976	ST9336187199; 51°35′01″N 2°05′50″W		1269292	1, Market Lane More images	Q26559411
Abbey Bridge	II	Mill Lane			1 July 1976	ST9328787440; 51°35′09″N 2°05′54″W		1269294	Abbey Bridge More images	Q26559413
Castle Wall of Mundens	II	Mill Lane			1 July 1976	ST9316987426; 51°35′08″N 2°06′00″W		1269295	Upload Photo	Q26559414
Section of Former Town Wall and 2 Towers	II	Mill Lane			1 July 1976	ST9323687400; 51°35′07″N 2°05′56″W		1269296	Upload Photo	Q26559415
Walls and Gazebo in Garden to North of Old Bell Hotel	II	Mill Lane			19 July 1996	ST9324587388; 51°35′07″N 2°05′56″W		1269297	Upload Photo	Q26559416
Gloucester Cottage Rear Range To Number 10 Gloucester Street (Number 10 Gloucester Street Not Included)	II	Olivers Lane			1 July 1976	ST9326187194; 51°35′01″N 2°05′55″W		1269299	Upload Photo	Q26559418
2, Olivers Lane	II	2, Olivers Lane			1 July 1976	ST9329087152; 51°34′59″N 2°05′54″W		1269298	Upload Photo	Q26559417
Tower House	II*	Oxford Street			18 January 1949	ST9342687256; 51°35′03″N 2°05′47″W		1269271	Tower House More images	Q17544344
Moravian Church and Attached Side Area Railings and Pier	II	Oxford Street			1 July 1976	ST9340287255; 51°35′03″N 2°05′48″W		1269305	Moravian Church and Attached Side Area Railings and Pier More images	Q26559422
3, Oxford Street	II	3, Oxford Street			1 July 1976	ST9333387215; 51°35′02″N 2°05′51″W		1269300	3, Oxford Street More images	Q26559419
4, Oxford Street	II	4, Oxford Street			1 July 1976	ST9333387230; 51°35′02″N 2°05′51″W		1269301	4, Oxford Street More images	Q26559420
5, Oxford Street	II	5, Oxford Street			1 July 1976	ST9334587211; 51°35′01″N 2°05′51″W		1269302	5, Oxford Street More images	Q26559421
Number 6 and Attached Outbuildings	II*	6, Oxford Street			18 January 1949	ST9334487231; 51°35′02″N 2°05′51″W		1269303	Number 6 and Attached Outbuildings More images	Q17544361
9, Oxford Street	II*	9, Oxford Street			1 July 1976	ST9336087217; 51°35′02″N 2°05′50″W		1269304	9, Oxford Street More images	Q17544369
The Manse of Moravian Church and Attached Side Area Railings	II	12, Oxford Street			1 July 1976	ST9340287243; 51°35′02″N 2°05′48″W		1269264	The Manse of Moravian Church and Attached Side Area Railings More images	Q26559388
15, Oxford Street	II	15, Oxford Street			1 July 1976	ST9342987265; 51°35′03″N 2°05′46″W		1269265	15, Oxford Street More images	Q26559389
17, Oxford Street	II	17, Oxford Street			1 July 1976	ST9342887273; 51°35′03″N 2°05′46″W		1269266	17, Oxford Street More images	Q26559390
19 and 19a, Oxford Street	II	19 and 19a, Oxford Street			1 July 1976	ST9342887285; 51°35′04″N 2°05′46″W		1269267	19 and 19a, Oxford Street More images	Q26559391
Numbers 20a and 20-26 and Attached Walls Extending Along North Side of Passage to North West	II	20a, 20-26, Oxford Street			1 July 1976	ST9339687286; 51°35′04″N 2°05′48″W		1269268	Numbers 20a and 20-26 and Attached Walls Extending Along North Side of Passage to North West More images	Q26559392
21, Oxford Street	II	21, Oxford Street			1 July 1976	ST9342887292; 51°35′04″N 2°05′46″W		1269269	21, Oxford Street More images	Q26559393
Latch Cottage	II	28 and 30, Oxford Street			1 July 1976	ST9341687311; 51°35′05″N 2°05′47″W		1269270	Latch Cottage More images	Q26559394
Milestone	II	Sherston Road			3 December 1986	ST9195887720; 51°35′18″N 2°07′03″W		1198584	Upload Photo	Q26494610
Former Town Wall Extending North West of Silver Street to Rear of 28-34 (not Included)	II	Silver Street			1 July 1976	ST9348987089; 51°34′57″N 2°05′43″W		1269223	Upload Photo	Q26559349
1, Silver Street	II	1, Silver Street			1 July 1976	ST9343087071; 51°34′57″N 2°05′46″W		1269257	1, Silver Street More images	Q26559381
2, Silver Street	II	2, Silver Street			20 November 1995	ST9342587099; 51°34′58″N 2°05′47″W		1269258	2, Silver Street More images	Q26559382
3, Silver Street	II	3, Silver Street			1 July 1976	ST9343587067; 51°34′57″N 2°05′46″W		1269259	3, Silver Street More images	Q26559383
5, Silver Street	II	5, Silver Street			1 July 1976	ST9344087062; 51°34′57″N 2°05′46″W		1269260	5, Silver Street More images	Q26559384
6 and 8, Silver Street	II	6 and 8, Silver Street			1 July 1976	ST9343887087; 51°34′57″N 2°05′46″W		1269261	6 and 8, Silver Street More images	Q26559385
Curlew Cottage	II	7 and 9, Silver Street			1 July 1976	ST9350087031; 51°34′56″N 2°05′43″W		1269262	Curlew Cottage More images	Q26559386
Avon Cottage	II	11 and 13, Silver Street			1 July 1976	ST9351487025; 51°34′55″N 2°05′42″W		1269263	Avon Cottage More images	Q26559387
Mayfield	II	14, Silver Street			1 July 1976	ST9345087072; 51°34′57″N 2°05′45″W		1269221	Upload Photo	Q26559347
16 and 18, Silver Street	II	16 and 18, Silver Street			1 July 1976	ST9345787062; 51°34′57″N 2°05′45″W		1269222	16 and 18, Silver Street More images	Q26559348
44 and 46, St Dennis Road	II	44 and 46, St Dennis Road			1 July 1976	ST9336287085; 51°34′57″N 2°05′50″W		1269272	44 and 46, St Dennis Road More images	Q26559395
48, St Dennis Road	II	48, St Dennis Road			2 April 1976	ST9335387083; 51°34′57″N 2°05′50″W		1269273	48, St Dennis Road More images	Q26559396
50, St Dennis Road	II	50, St Dennis Road			1 July 1976	ST9334887081; 51°34′57″N 2°05′51″W		1269274	50, St Dennis Road More images	Q26559397
St John's Court	II*	St Johns Bridge, SN16 9BN			18 January 1949	ST9351686949; 51°34′53″N 2°05′42″W		1269276	St John's Court More images	Q17544348
Conservatory Cottage	II	St Johns Bridge			12 December 1951	ST9359786900; 51°34′51″N 2°05′38″W		1269277	Upload Photo	Q26559399
Avon Mills, Inner Buildings	II	St Johns Bridge			12 December 1951	ST9358486929; 51°34′52″N 2°05′38″W		1269278	Upload Photo	Q26559400
Avon Mills, Outer Buldings	II	St Johns Bridge			12 December 1951	ST9358386884; 51°34′51″N 2°05′38″W		1269279	Avon Mills, Outer Buldings More images	Q26559401
Bridge Cottage	II	St Johns Bridge			18 January 1949	ST9353586931; 51°34′52″N 2°05′41″W		1269280	Bridge Cottage More images	Q26559402
St Johns Bridge and Attached Walls	II	St Johns Bridge			18 January 1949	ST9354686910; 51°34′52″N 2°05′40″W		1269281	St Johns Bridge and Attached Walls More images	Q26559403
1 and 3, St Johns Bridge	II	1 and 3, St Johns Bridge			18 January 1949	ST9352786935; 51°34′52″N 2°05′41″W		1269275	1 and 3, St Johns Bridge More images	Q26559398
Court House to Rear of Number 27 and Attached Wall	I	St Johns Street			18 January 1949	ST9353086969; 51°34′54″N 2°05′41″W		1269247	Court House to Rear of Number 27 and Attached Wall More images	Q17529820
Baskerville Bridge	II	St Johns Street			1 July 1976	ST9354387056; 51°34′56″N 2°05′41″W		1269250	Upload Photo	Q26559374
Numbers 6 and 8 and St Johns Cottage	II	6 and 8, St Johns Street			18 January 1949	ST9349886970; 51°34′54″N 2°05′43″W		1269282	Numbers 6 and 8 and St Johns Cottage More images	Q26559404
10 and 12, St Johns Street	II	10 and 12, St Johns Street			1 July 1976	ST9349986978; 51°34′54″N 2°05′43″W		1269283	10 and 12, St Johns Street More images	Q26559405
14,16 And 16A, St Johns Street	II	14, 16 and 16a, St Johns Street			1 July 1976	ST9349986984; 51°34′54″N 2°05′43″W		1269284	14,16 And 16A, St Johns Street More images	Q26559406
15, St Johns Street	II	15, St Johns Street			18 January 1949	ST9351886955; 51°34′53″N 2°05′42″W		1269243	Upload Photo	Q26559368
18 and 20, St Johns Street	II	18 and 20, St Johns Street			1 July 1976	ST9350286993; 51°34′54″N 2°05′43″W		1269244	Upload Photo	Q26559369
22-32, St Johns Street	II	22-32, St Johns Street			1 July 1976	ST9351287001; 51°34′55″N 2°05′42″W		1269245	22-32, St Johns Street More images	Q26559370
25 and 27, St Johns Street	II	25 and 27, St Johns Street			1 July 1976	ST9352086966; 51°34′53″N 2°05′42″W		1269246	Upload Photo	Q26559371
Wall and Store, Extending Round Forecourt To Number 29 (not Included)	II	St Johns Street			1 July 1976	ST9352586986; 51°34′54″N 2°05′41″W		1269248	Upload Photo	Q26559372
Goosebridge Cottage and Attached Wall	II	37 and 41, St Johns Street			1 July 1976	ST9353787038; 51°34′56″N 2°05′41″W		1269249	Goosebridge Cottage and Attached Wall More images	Q26559373
9, St Marys Lane	II	9, St Marys Lane			1 July 1976	ST9308687485; 51°35′10″N 2°06′04″W		1269251	Upload Photo	Q26559375
St Marys Hall	II	St Marys Street			1 July 1976	ST9307287470; 51°35′10″N 2°06′05″W		1269256	St Marys Hall More images	Q26559380
2, St Marys Street	II	2, St Marys Street			18 January 1949	ST9306387448; 51°35′09″N 2°06′05″W		1269252	2, St Marys Street More images	Q26559376
4, St Marys Street	II	4, St Marys Street			18 January 1949	ST9306187453; 51°35′09″N 2°06′06″W		1269253	4, St Marys Street More images	Q26559377
6, St Marys Street	II	6, St Marys Street			18 January 1949	ST9305687458; 51°35′09″N 2°06′06″W		1269254	6, St Marys Street More images	Q26559378
16, St Marys Street	II	16, St Marys Street			1 July 1976	ST9303787485; 51°35′10″N 2°06′07″W		1269255	Upload Photo	Q26559379
Number 86 And Attached Front Area Railings	II	86, The Triangle			1 July 1976	ST9305687418; 51°35′08″N 2°06′06″W		1269470	Number 86 And Attached Front Area Railings More images	Q26559580
Number 1 and Attached Front Area Walls and Railings	II	1, West Street			1 July 1976	ST9299987406; 51°35′08″N 2°06′09″W		1269224	Number 1 and Attached Front Area Walls and Railings More images	Q26559350
4-12, West Street	II	4-12, West Street			24 June 1974	ST9298687408; 51°35′08″N 2°06′09″W		1269225	4-12, West Street More images	Q26559351
32 and 34, West Street	II	32 and 34, West Street			1 July 1976	ST9298987470; 51°35′10″N 2°06′09″W		1269226	Upload Photo	Q26559352
36 and 38, West Street	II	36 and 38, West Street			1 July 1976	ST9299287481; 51°35′10″N 2°06′09″W		1269227	Upload Photo	Q26559353
Top End House	II	40 and 42, West Street			1 July 1976	ST9299387490; 51°35′10″N 2°06′09″W		1269228	Upload Photo	Q26559354
Malmesbury War Memorial	II				18 May 2017	ST9307087407; 51°35′08″N 2°06′05″W		1446261	Malmesbury War Memorial More images	Q66478759

== See also ==
- Grade I listed buildings in Wiltshire
- Grade II* listed buildings in Wiltshire

== Sources ==
- Orbach, Julian; Pevsner, Nikolaus; Cherry, Bridget (2021), Wiltshire, The Buildings of England, New Haven and London: Yale University Press, ISBN 978-0-300-25120-3
