= Malmesbury Market Cross =

Structure in Malmesbury, Wiltshire, England

Coordinates: 51.5838°N 2.0981°W

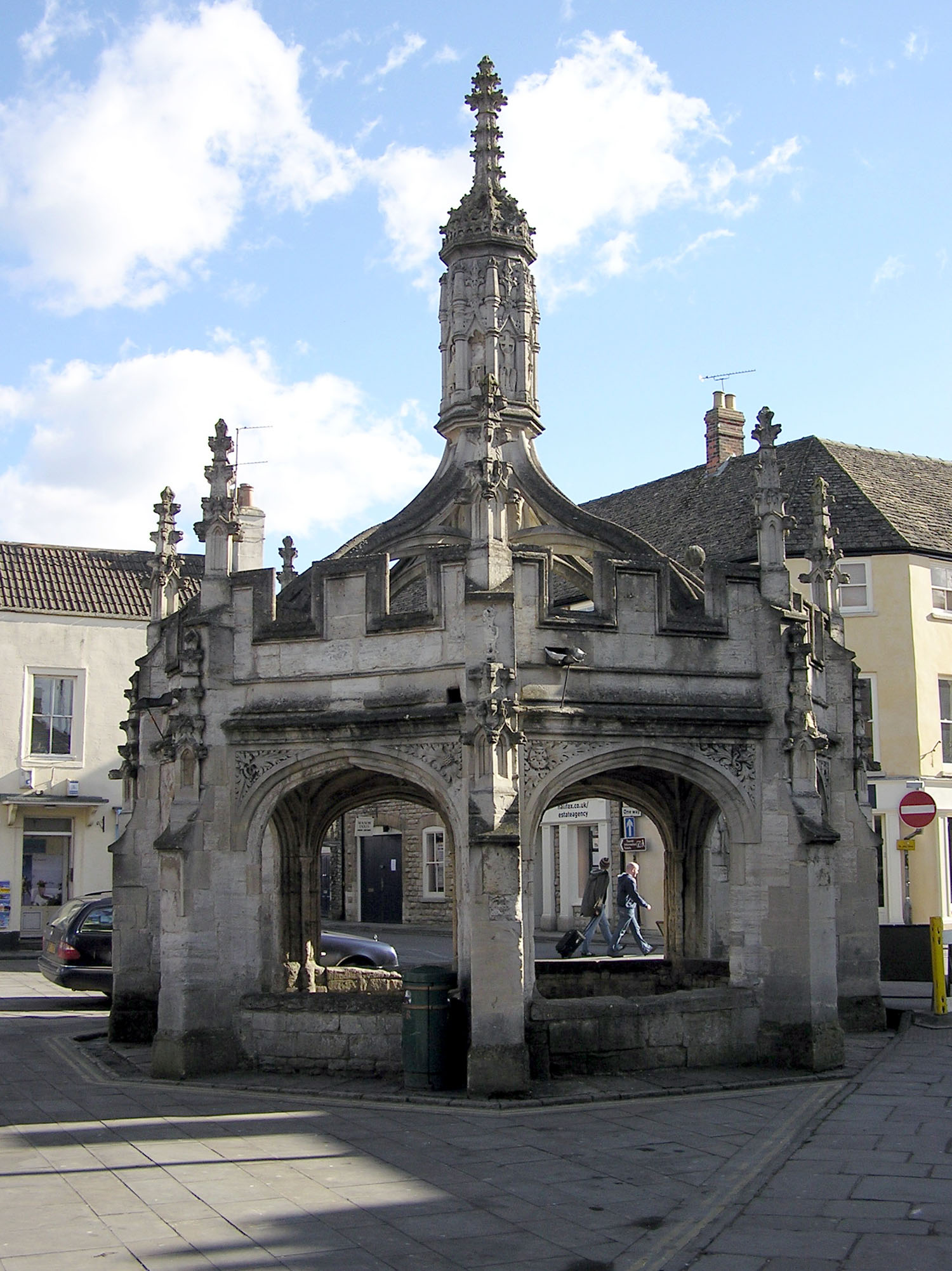
The Market Cross

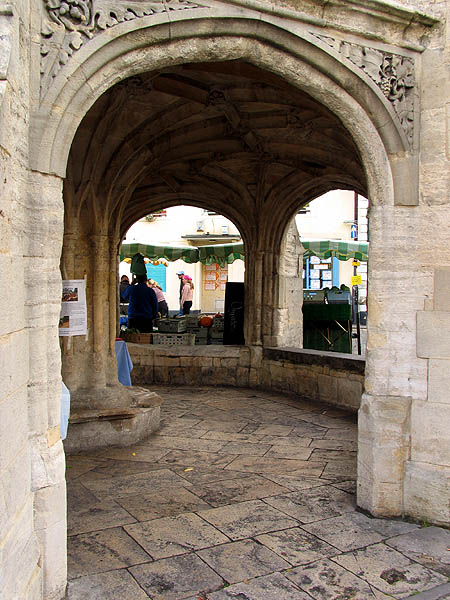
View through one of the two doorway arches, showing the central bench and two benched arches

Malmesbury Market Cross is a Grade I listed, late 15th-century structure in the town of Malmesbury, Wiltshire, England.

== Description ==
The market cross stands in the centre of the town, at the north end of the High Street. It was built c. 1490, possibly using limestone salvaged from the recently ruined part of Malmesbury Abbey, which then began just across the market square from the cross. An elaborately carved octagonal structure of the Perpendicular Period, it is recognised as one of the best preserved of its kind in England, and was made a Grade I listed building in 1949. A carving in relief of the Crucifixion and figures of several saints have survived the Reformation on the open lantern, although the lower niches for figures are now empty. Inside there is a lierne vaulted roof with carved bosses, springing from a central column with stone seating around it. There is a low wall or bench across all the outside arches except two. The building is over 40 ft. high, and today is nicknamed "the Birdcage", because of its appearance, and still serves to shelter market traders by day and as a meeting point at night.

It was described by John Leland, who visited Malmesbury in 1542, as follows:

Malmesbyri hath a good quik [lively] market kept every Saturday. There is a right fair and costeley peace of worke in the market place made all of stone and curiusly voultid for poore market folkes to stande dry when rayne cummith. Ther be 8 great pillers and 8 open arches: and the work is 8 square: one great piller in the midle berith up the voulte. The men of the toun made this peace of work in hominum memoria [within living memory].

The cross was renovated in about 1800 at the expense of John Howard, 15th Earl of Suffolk, and subsequently repaired in 1909–12 and 1949–50. In 1879–80, the Society for the Protection of Ancient Buildings (in its third year of existence) sent two council members who drew up a report of the repairs needed for Lord Northwick, who owned the cross, but it is not clear what was done. One pinnacle knocked off by a heavy goods vehicle in recent years is in the Athelstan Museum in the town.

== Related structures ==
An even more elaborate covered market cross in a similar style is the Chichester Cross; the Poultry Cross at Salisbury is also similar in many ways although it only has six buttresses; Ipswich once had another, in a lighter Renaissance style, but this survives only in old prints.
