= Market cross =

Structure marking a market square

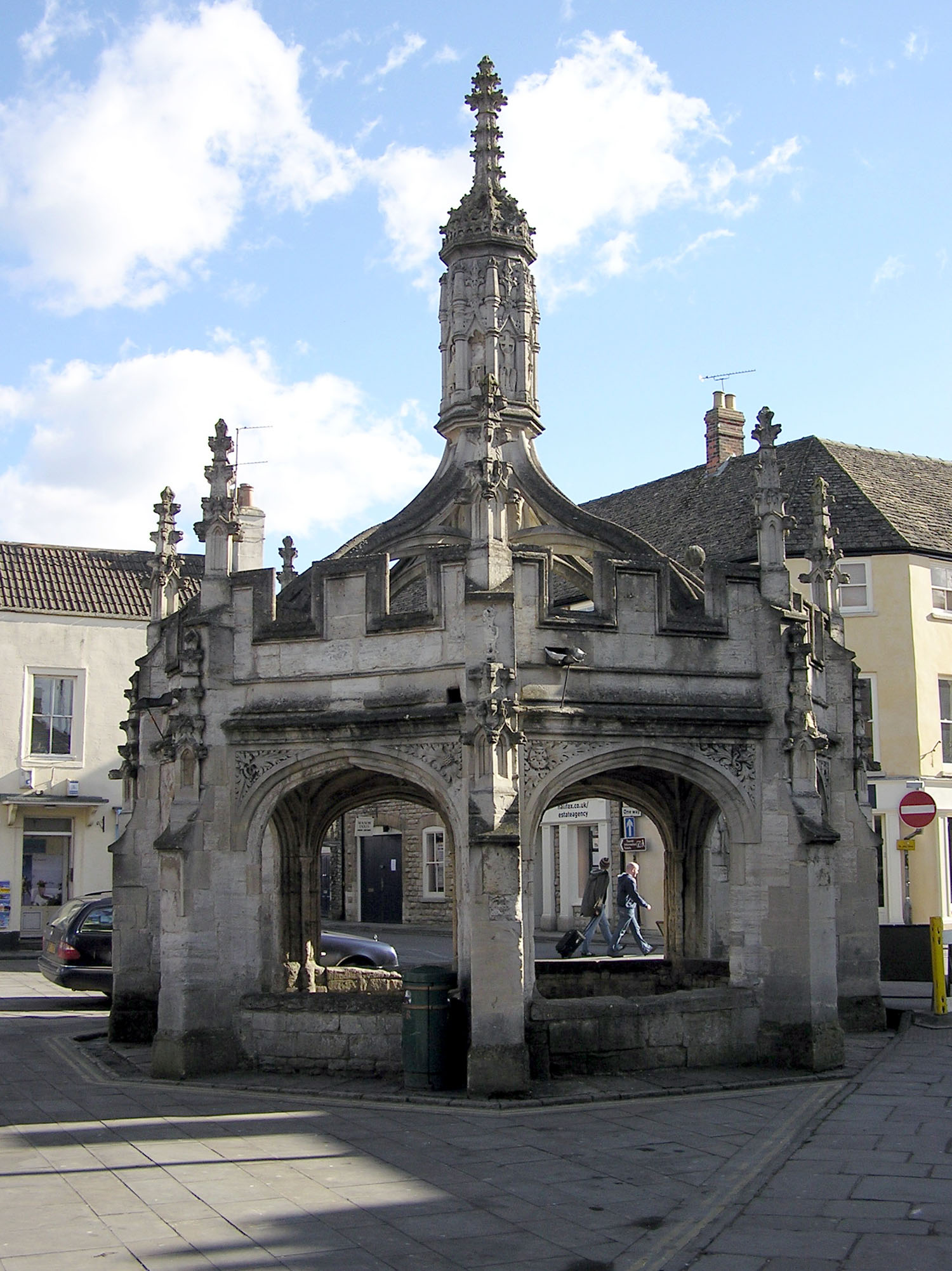
The elaborate Malmesbury market cross

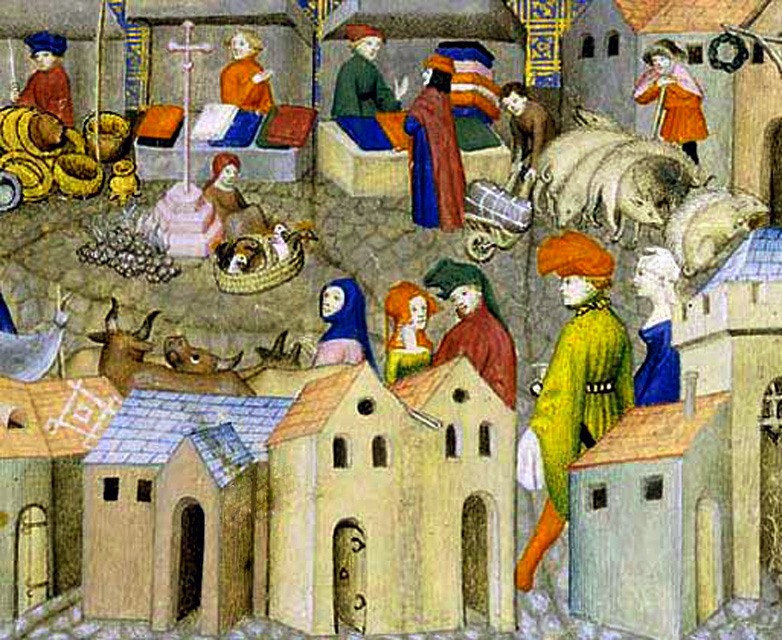
French market with cross, from an early 15th-century illumination by the Master of the Cité des dames

A market cross, or, in Scots, a mercat cross, is a structure used to mark a market square in market towns, where historically the right to hold a regular market, or fair, was granted by the monarch, a bishop or a baron.

== History ==
Market crosses were originally from the distinctive tradition in Early Medieval Insular art of free-standing stone standing or high crosses, often elaborately carved, which goes back to the 7th century. Market crosses can be found in many market towns in Britain. British emigrants often installed such crosses in their new cities, and several can be found in Canada and Australia.

The market cross could be representing the official site for a medieval town or village market, granted by a charter, or it could have once represented a traditional religious marking at a crossroads.

== Design ==
These structures range from carved stone spires, obelisks or crosses, common to small market towns such as that in Stalbridge, Dorset, to large, ornate covered structures, such as the Chichester Cross, or Malmesbury Market Cross. They can also be constructed from wood; an example is at Wymondham, Norfolk.

== Towns and villages in the British isles with a market cross ==
=== A ===
- Aberdeen
- Aberford
- Abbots Bromley
- Aldbourne
- Alfriston
- Alnwick
- Alston
- Ambleside
- Ashbourne
- Austwick (Base and pillar remaining)
- Askrigg
- Austwick
- Aylburton

=== B ===
- Banbury
- Barnard Castle
- Barrow upon Humber
- Bawtry
- Bedale
- Belford
- Beverley
- Billesdon (x2)
- Bingham
- Bingley
- Binham
- Bishops Lydeard
- Bodenham
- Bonsall
- Boroughbridge
- Bottesford, Leicestershire
- Bourton, Vale of White Horse
- Bovey Tracey
- Brandesburton
- Brigstock
- Bromborough
- Brough (Original block and socket remaining)
- Buckingham
- Bungay
- Burnley
- Bedlington
- Bury St. Edmunds
- Burton-in-Kendal
- Buxton

=== C ===
- Caldbeck
- Carlisle
- Castle Combe
- Castle Rising
- Chapel-en-le-Frith
- Cheadle, Staffordshire
- Cheddar
- Chester
- Chichester
- Chipping Sodbury
- Chipping Warden
- Colne
- Clowne
- Corbridge (x2)
- Corby Glen
- Corfe Castle
- Coventry (Note: This monument, a replacement for a market cross, was demolished in January 2019.)
- Crich
- Cricklade
- Culross
- Culworth
- Cumnock

=== D ===
- Dalton-in-Furness
- Darlington
- Devizes
- Dunchurch
- Dundee
- Dunkeld
- Dunstable
- Yarn Market, Dunster

=== E ===
- Edinburgh
- Easingwold
- East Hagbourne
- Elstow
- Emley, West Yorkshire
- Enfield Town
- Epworth
- Eynsham

=== F ===
- Frome

=== G ===
- Garstang
- Giggleswick
- Glasgow
- Glastonbury
- Glossop
- Grampound with Creed
- Grantham
- Guisborough

=== H ===
- Harringworth
- Helmsley
- Helpston
- Henley-in-Arden
- Hereford
- Higham Ferrers
- Highburton
- Hillmorton
- Hooton Pagnell
- Howden
- Holsworthy
- Holt
- Huddersfield
- Hunmanby

=== I ===
- Ilchester
- Irthlingborough

=== K ===
- Keighley
- King Sterndale
- King's Cliffe
- Kirkby in Ashfield
- Kirkby Lonsdale (x2)
- Kirkby Malzeard
- Kirkbymoorside
- Knaresborough

=== L ===
- Lambourn
- Launceston, Cornwall
- Lavenham
- Leek
- Leicester
- Leigh, Greater Manchester
- Leighton–Linslade
- Leighton Buzzard
- Lerwick
- Lower Holker
- Lund, East Riding of Yorkshire
- Lydney
- Lyneham, Wiltshire

=== M ===
- Maiden Newton
- Maltby, South Yorkshire
- Mark, Somerset
- Market Deeping
- Malmesbury
- Mansfield
- Mansfield Woodhouse
- Martock
- Masham
- Maybole
- Melbourne, Derbyshire
- Metheringham
- Middleham
- Middleton-in-Teesdale
- Mildenhall
- Milnthorpe
- Minchinhampton
- Minehead
- Monk Bretton
- Mountsorrel

=== N ===
- Newcastle-under-Lyme
- Newport, Wales
- Newport, Shropshire
- Newsham, Richmondshire
- Newton Abbot
- North Frodingham
- North Kyme
- North Turton
- North Tawton
- North Walsham
- New Buckenham
- Northallerton
- Nunney

=== O ===
- Oakenshaw
- Oakham Market Cross
- Old Cross, Old Glossop
- Overthorpe, West Yorkshire

=== P ===
- Pembroke
- Penryn, Cornwall
- Pontefract
- Poulton-le-Fylde

=== Q ===
- Quainton

=== R ===
- Reach, Cambridgeshire
- Repton
- Ripley, North Yorkshire
- Ripon
- Rochdale
- Rockingham, Northamptonshire
- Rothesay
- Rutherglen

=== S ===
- Saffron Walden
- Salisbury
- Sedgemoor
- Selby
- Shap
- Shepton Mallet
- Somerton
- Spilsby
- St Albans
- Stalbridge
- Stamfordham
- Standish, Greater Manchester
- Stanhope, County Durham (x2)
- Steeple Ashton
- Stockton-on-Tees
- Stow-on-the-Wold
- Stretham
- Sturminster Newton
- Swaffham
- Swineshead, Lincolnshire
- Swinton (Berwickshire)

=== T ===
- Tattershall
- Thornton-le-Dale
- Tickhill

=== U ===
- Uttoxeter

=== W ===
- Wainfleet All Saints
- Wantage
- Warkworth, Northumberland
- Wedmore
- Wells
- West Bedlington
- West Burton
- West Malling, Kent
- Weston, Runcorn
- Whittlesey
- Wigtown (x2)
- Williton (x2)
- Winchester
- Witney
- Woodhouse, South Yorkshire
- Wymondham

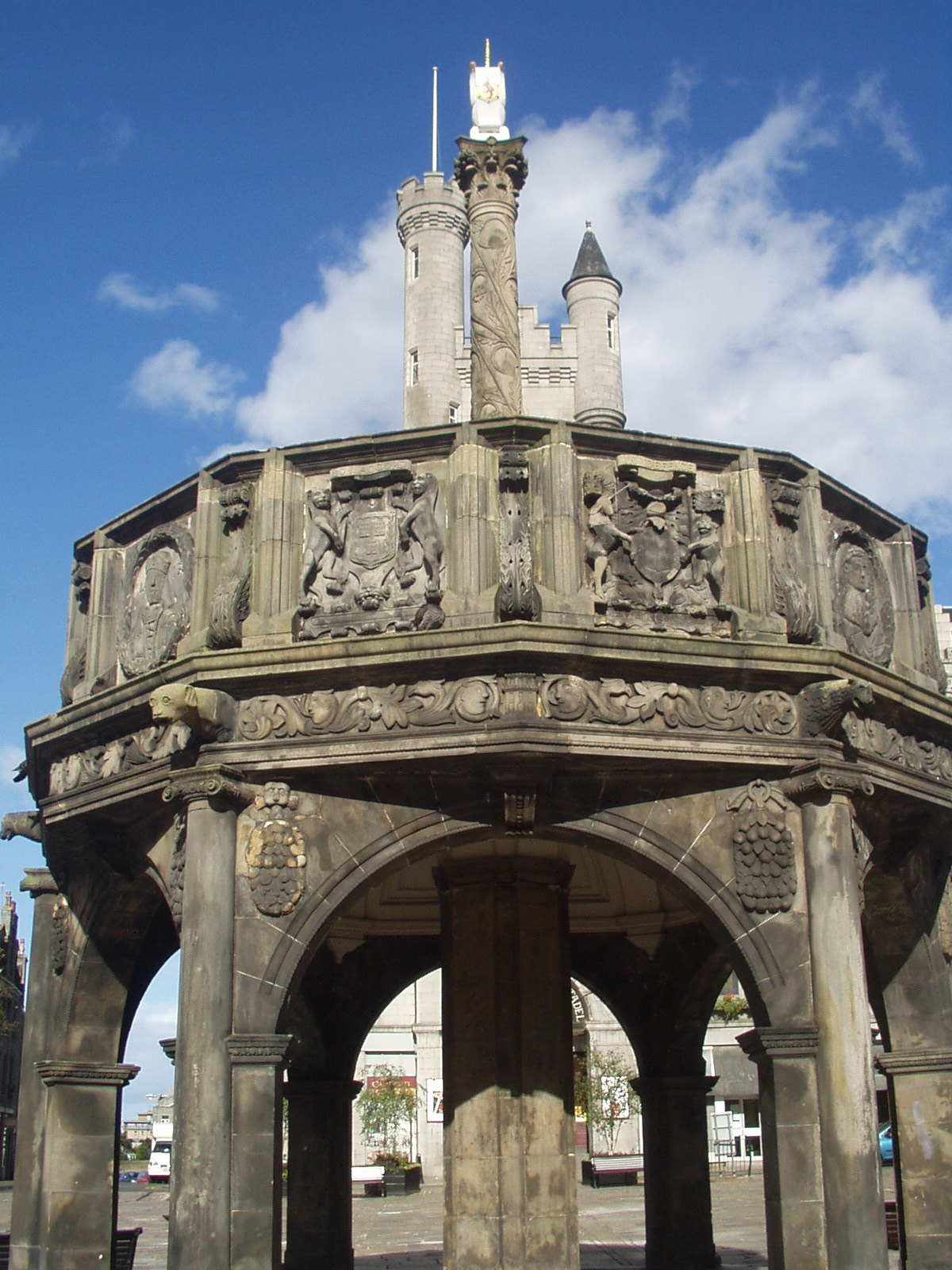
Aberdeen

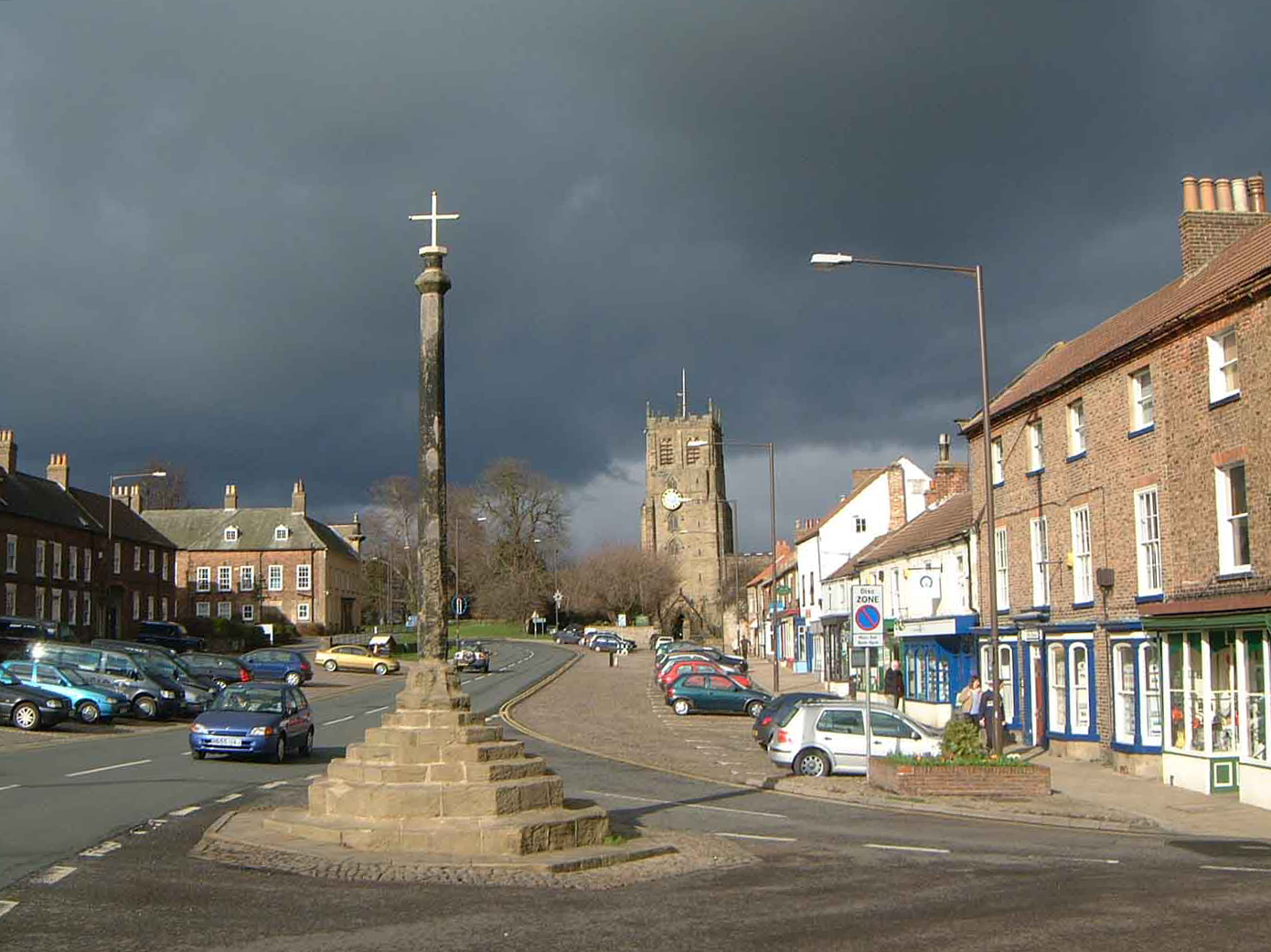
Bedale

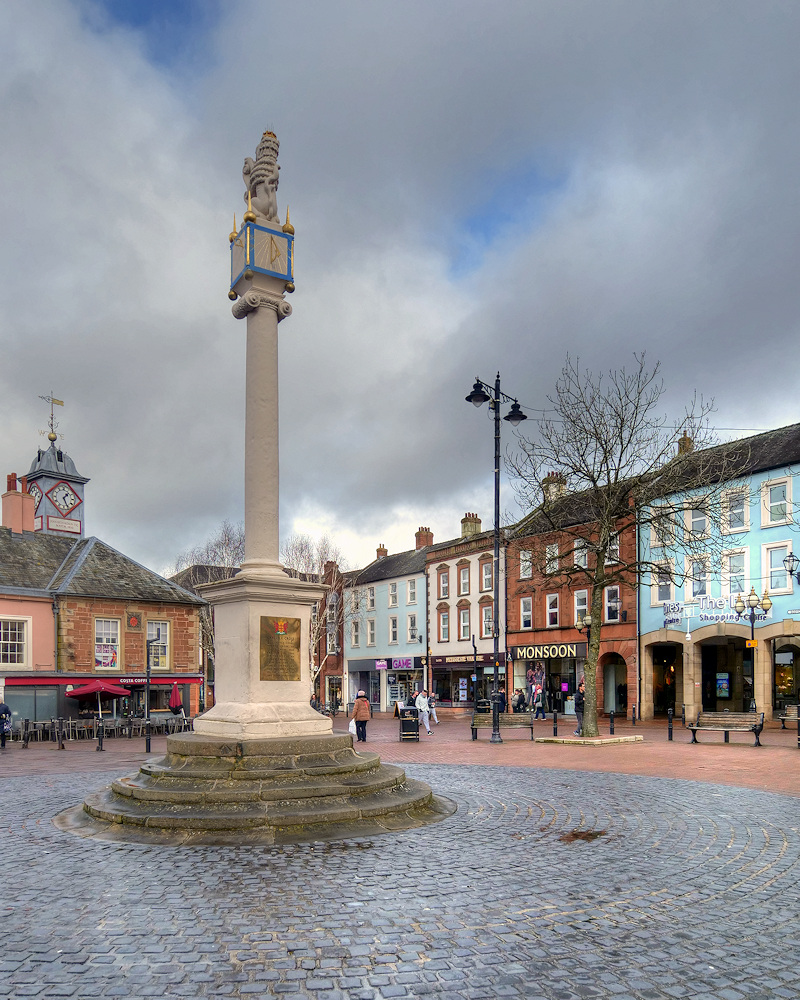
Carlisle

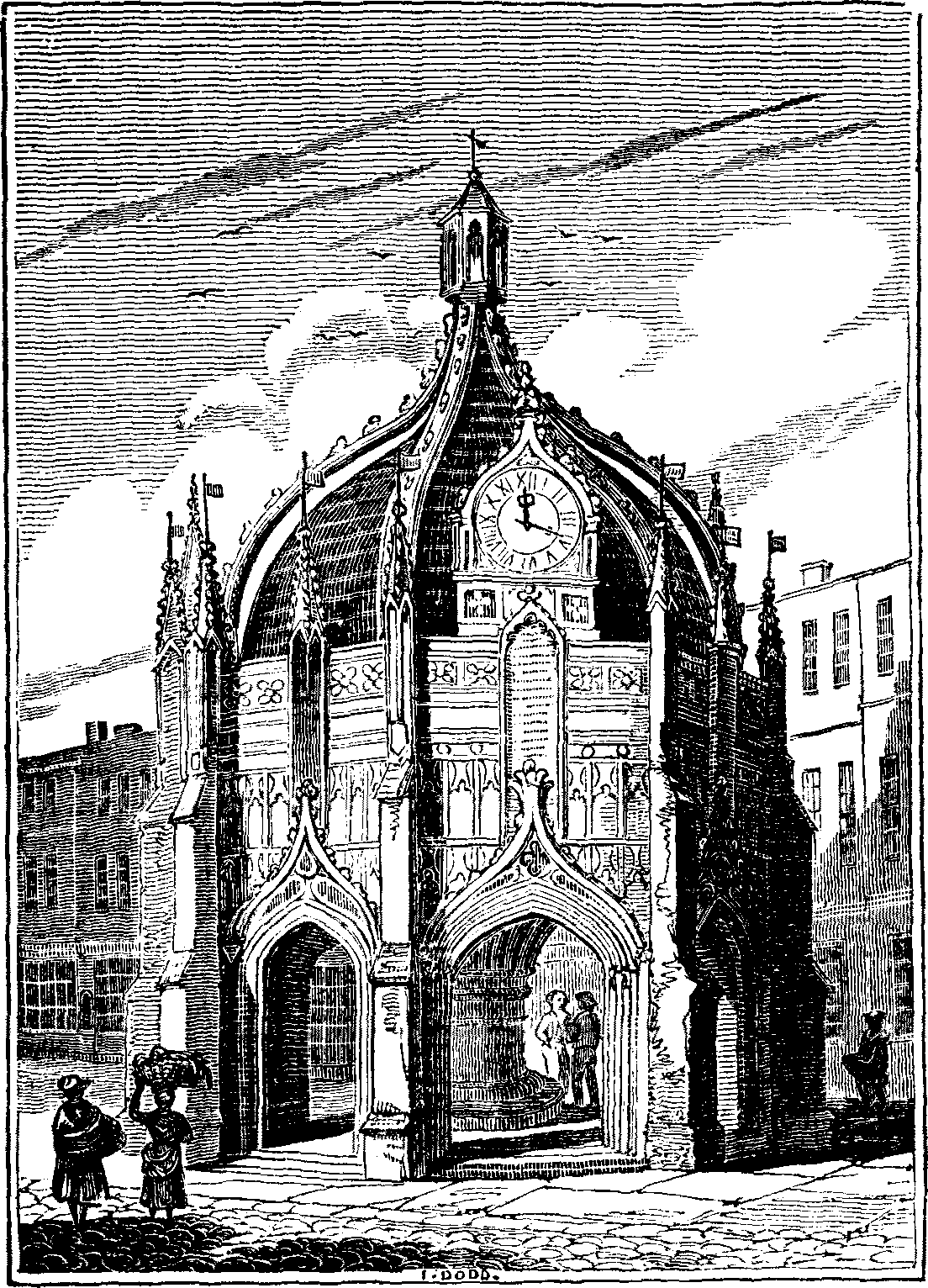
Chichester

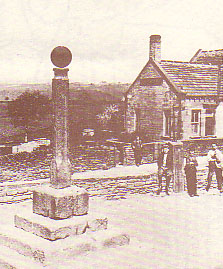
Highburton

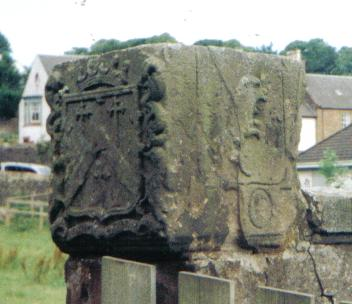
Maybole

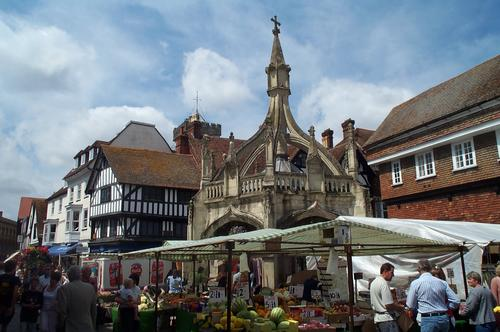
Salisbury

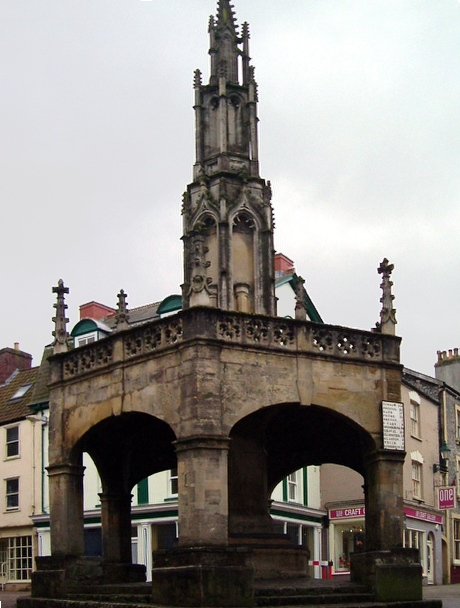
Shepton Mallet

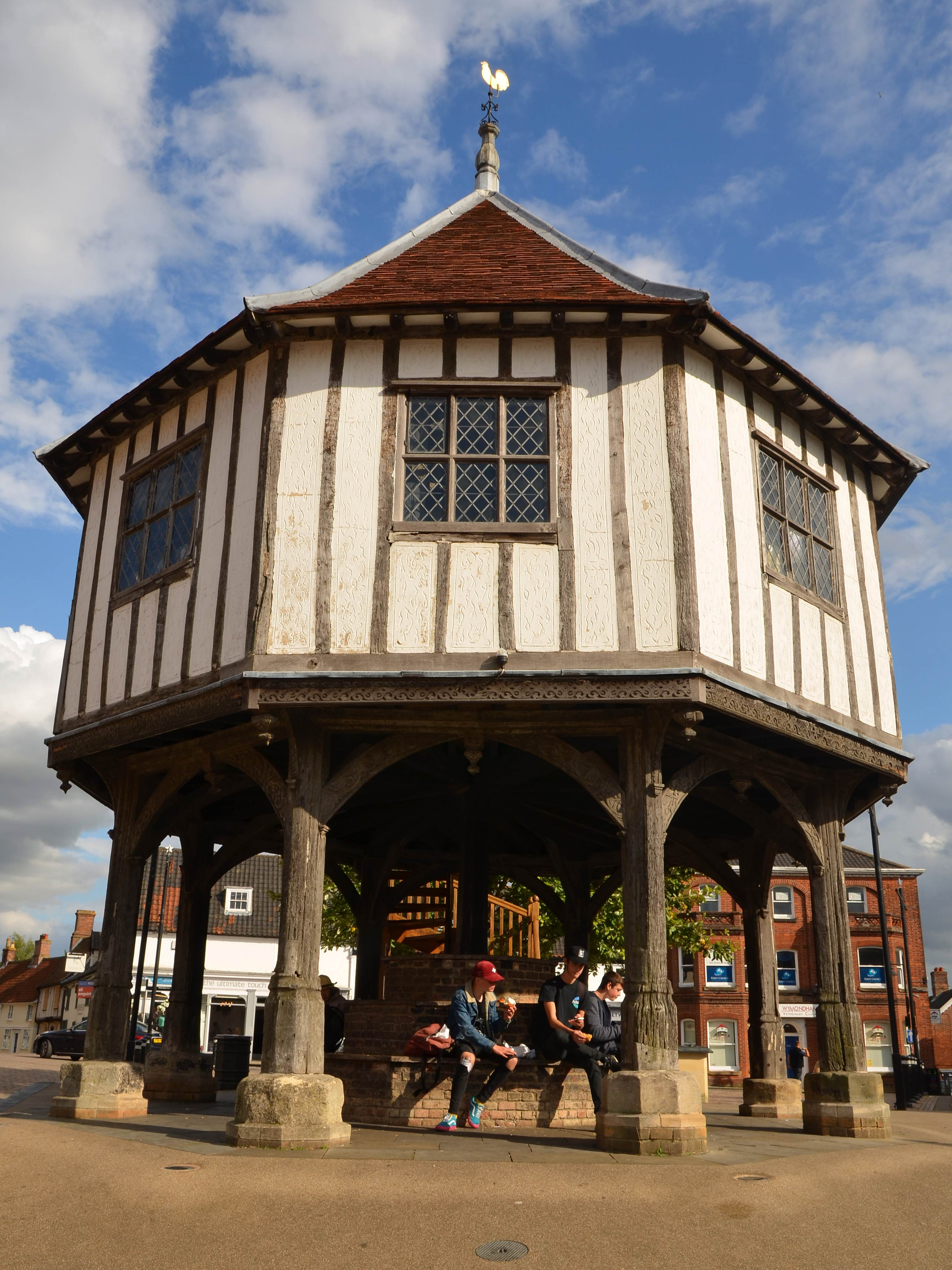
Wymondham

== See also ==
- Perron
- Tottenham High Cross
- Eleanor cross
- Bristol High Cross - now moved
- Glasgow Cross
