= Malmesbury Hoard =

Roman coin hoard found in Wiltshire, England

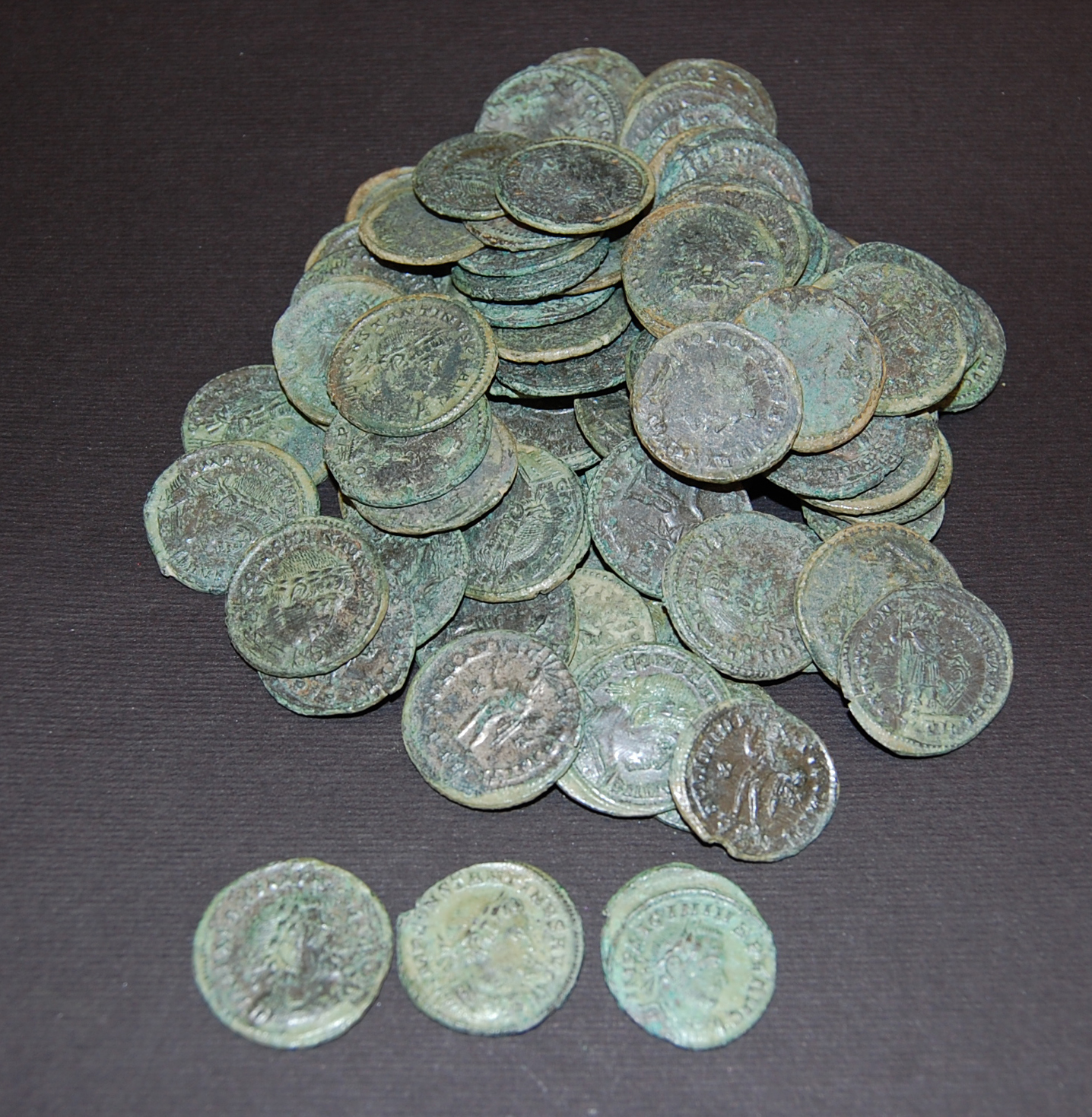
- A portion of the coins from the hoard.
- Material: Roman coins Roman pottery
- Size: 1,266 coins
- Created: 296–317
- Period/culture: Romano-British
- Discovered: 2012; Malmesbury, Wiltshire, England
- Present location: Athelstan Museum, Malmesbury

The Malmesbury Hoard is Romano-British coin hoard found near Malmesbury, Wiltshire, England in 2012.

== Discovery and contents ==
The coins were found together with a ceramic vessel by a metal detectorist in September 2012.

The hoard contained 1,266 coins, of which 1,263 are nummi and three are radiates. They date between AD 286 and 317. The radiates are of the Emperors Diocletian, Maximianus, and Allectus. The nummi were minted in at least eight cities, with the largest concentrations coming from London (680 coins), Trier (441 coins), and Arles (103 coins).

== Acquisition and display ==
The hoard was acquired by the Athelstan Museum in Malmesbury with a grant from the Heritage Lottery Fund, and put on public display in April 2022.
