= Chichester Cross =

Grade I listed structure in Chichester, England

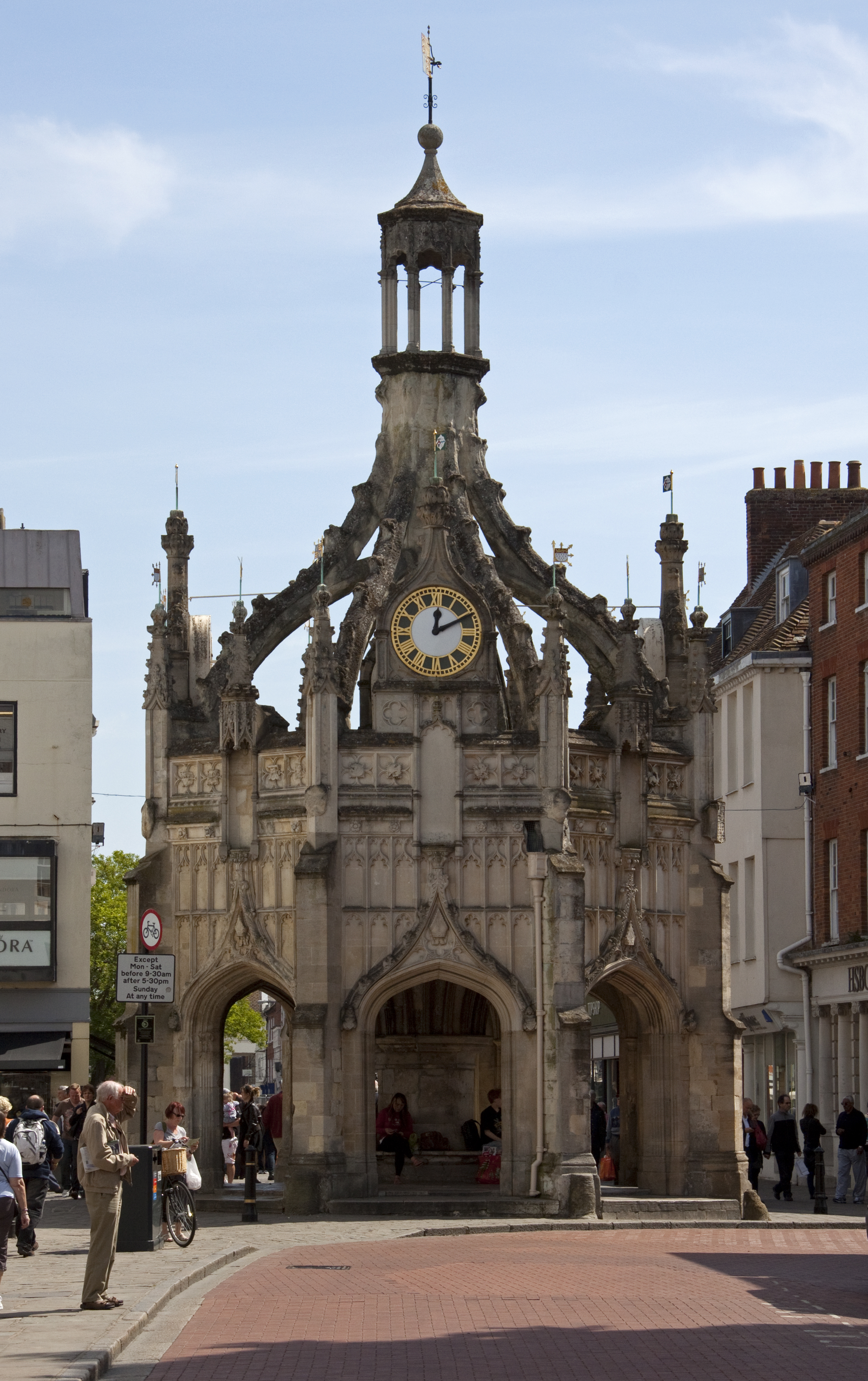
- Chichester Cross in May 2011

- Location of the Chichester Cross within West Sussex
- 50°50′12″N 0°46′45″W
- Location: Chichester, West Sussex, England

History
- Built: c. 1477 to 1503
- Built for: Edward Story

Site notes
- Restored: 1746
- Restored by: Charles Lennox, 2nd Duke of Richmond
- Governing body: Historic England
- Owner: Chichester District Council

Listed Building – Grade I
- Designated: 5 July 1950; 76 years ago

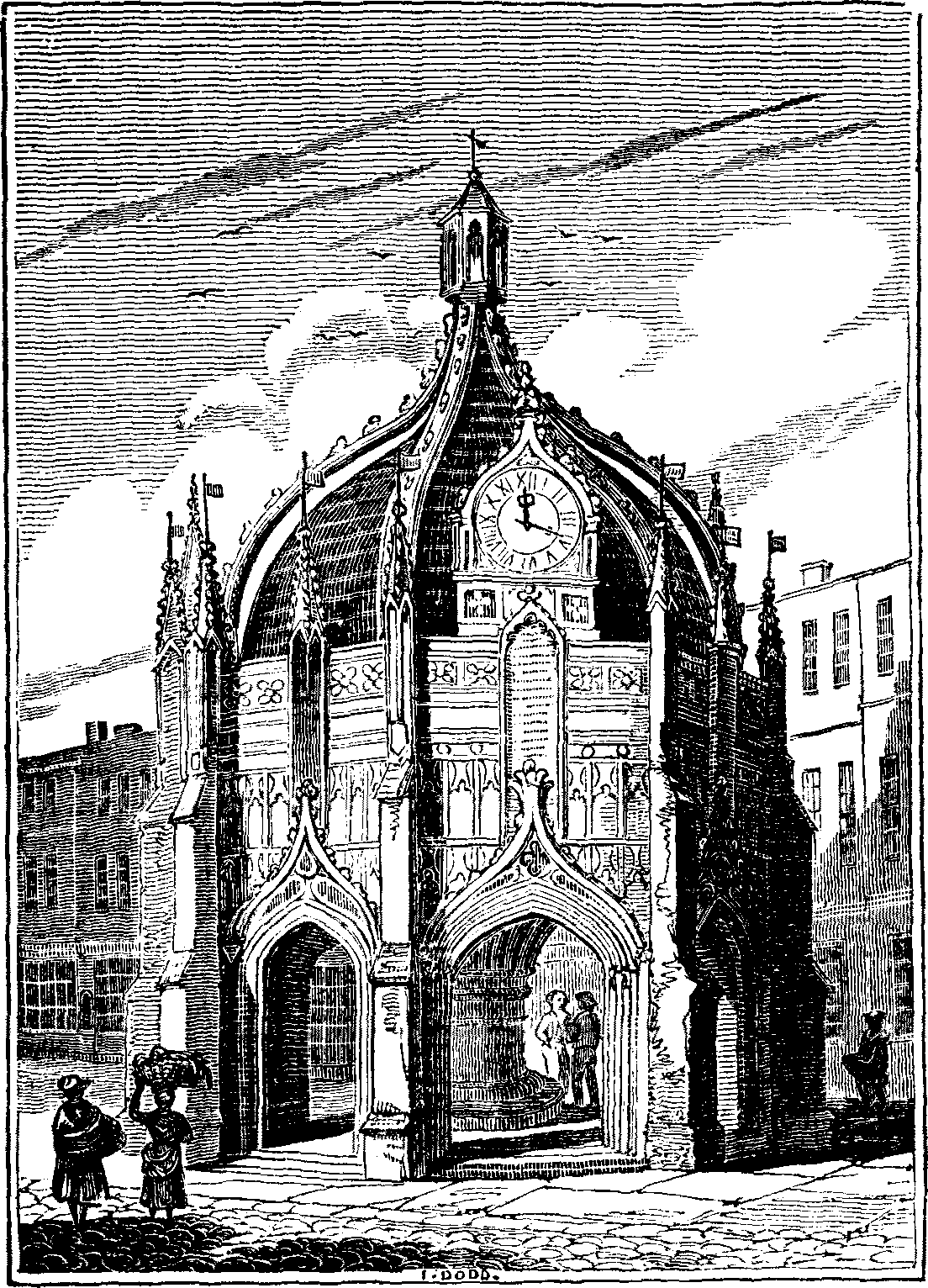
Chichester Cross, in a c. 1831 illustration.

Chichester Cross is an elaborate Perpendicular market cross in the centre of the city of Chichester, West Sussex, standing 50 feet tall at the intersection of the four principal streets. It is a Grade I listed building.

According to the inscription upon it, this cross was built by Edward Story, Bishop of Chichester from 1477 to 1503, but little is known for certain and the style and ornaments of the building suggest that it may date from the reign of Edward IV. It was built so that the poor people should have somewhere to sell their wares, and as a meeting point. An earlier wooden cross had been erected on the same site by Bishop William Reade (1369–1385). The stone cross was repaired during the reign of Charles II, and at the expense of Charles Lennox, 2nd Duke of Richmond in 1746, and stands to this day.

The Market Cross is constructed of Caen stone, one of the most favoured building materials of the age. The cross's form is octangular, having a strong butment at each angle, surmounted with pinnacles. On each of its faces is an entrance through a pointed arch, ornamented with crockets and a finial. Above this, on four of its sides, is a tablet, to commemorate its repair in the reign of Charles II. Above each tablet is a dial, exhibiting the hour to each of the three principal streets; the fourth being excluded from this advantage by standing at an angle. In the centre is a large circular column, the basement of which forms a seat: into this column is inserted a number of groinings, which, spreading from the centre, form the roof beautifully moulded. The central column appears to continue through the roof, and is supported without by eight flying buttresses, which rest on the several corners of the building. Malmesbury Market Cross in Wiltshire is the other surviving late medieval covered English market cross with a similar form, but rather smaller and simpler.

Until the start of the nineteenth century the Cross was used as a market-place; but the increased population of the city requiring a more extensive area for that purpose, a large and convenient market-house was, about the year 1807, erected in the North-street; on the completion of which, it was proposed to take down this Cross, then considered as a nuisance. This was prevented from taking place when some of the members of the corporation purchased several houses on the north side of the Cross in order to widen that part of the street by their demolition.

A bust of King Charles I by Hubert Le Sueur was added to the cross in the 1660s. The bust was removed in the 1970s after which it was replaced by a glass fibre replica. In 2019 it was loaned to The Novium museum.
