= Malmesbury Town Hall =

Municipal building in Malmesbury, Wiltshire, England

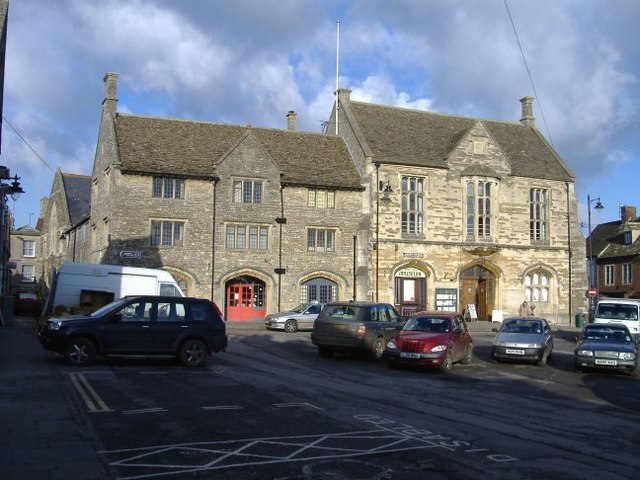
- Malmesbury Town Hall, with the original building on the right and the extension on the left

- Shown in Wiltshire
- 51.5837°N 2.0969°W
- Location: Cross Hayes, Malmesbury, Wiltshire, England

History
- Built: 1854

Site notes
- Architectural style: Tudor Revival style

Listed Building – Grade II
- Official name: Town Hall
- Designated: 23 March 1976
- Reference no.: 1269481

Malmesbury Town Hall is a municipal building in Cross Hayes in Malmesbury, Wiltshire, England. The structure, which is the meeting place of Malmesbury Town Council and the home of the Athelstan Museum, is a Grade II listed building.

== History ==
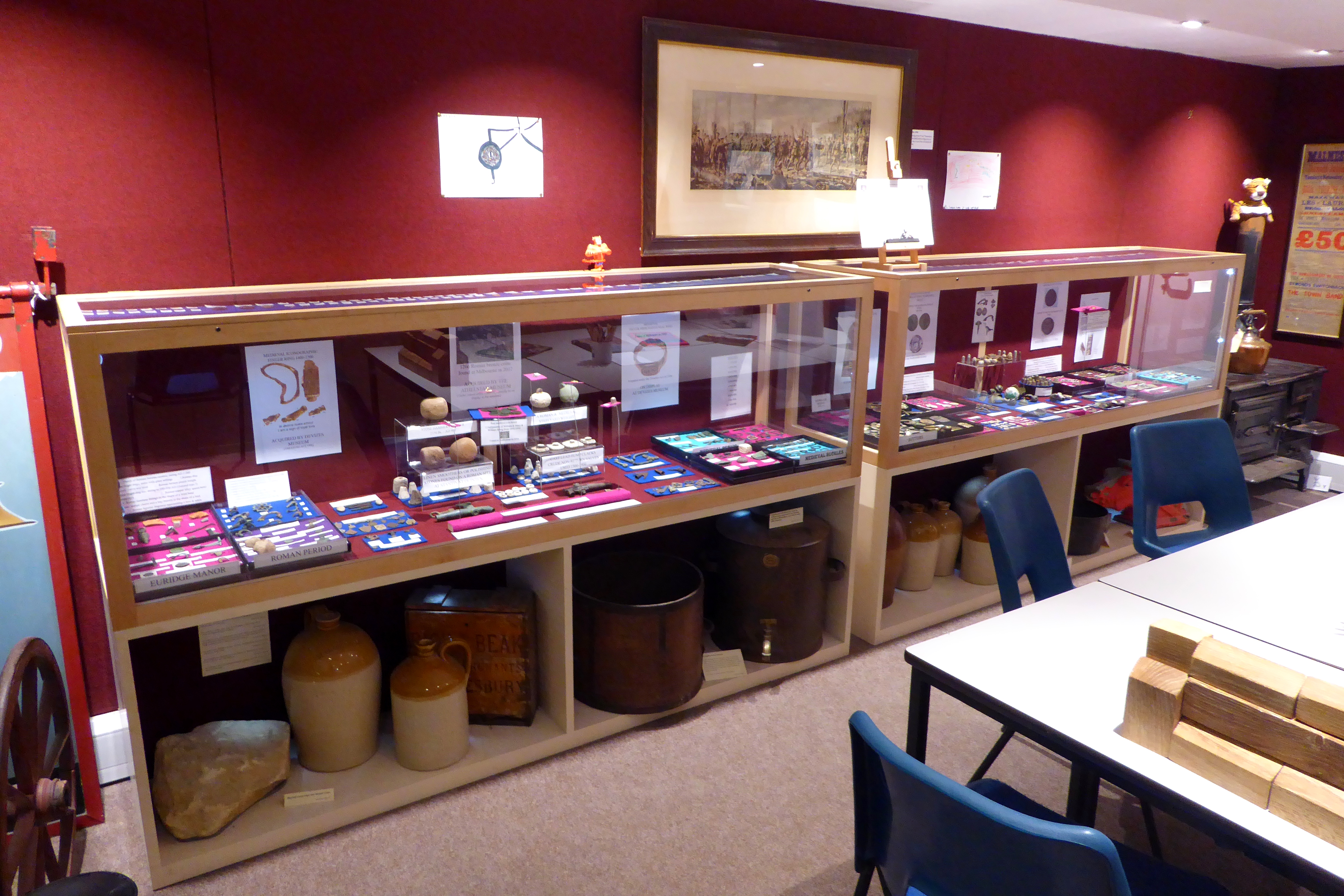
Display in the Athelstan Museum

After the dissolution of the monasteries in 1536, the borough council acquired St Paul's Church and adapted the east end of the building for use as a town hall. By the mid-19th century, the building was in a dilapidated condition and, in 1852, the council decided to demolish the main structure leaving just the tower. The council went on to commission a new structure: the site they chose was on the north side of Cross Hayes.

The new building was designed in the Tudor Revival style, built in coursed limestone and was completed in 1854. The design involved a symmetrical main frontage with three bays facing onto Cross Hayes; the central bay featured an arched opening with a hood mould on the ground floor, an oriel window on the first floor and a gable above. The outer bays also featured arched openings with hood moulds on the ground floor but were fenestrated by three-light mullioned and transomed windows on the first floor. Internally, the principal room was the assembly room on the first floor, which featured a proscenium arch.

In the mid-19th century, as well as being the meeting place of the borough council, the building was the venue for the local petty session hearings. In December 1871, the town hall was the venue for a public meeting to promote the idea of a Malmesbury branch line; the line was completed just six years later. The borough council was reformed under the Municipal Corporations Act 1883.

Storage facilities were established in the town hall for the local horse-drawn fire engine in 1907, and the building was extended by three bays to the left in 1927. The extension was designed in a similar style, with arched openings on the ground floor and a gable over the central bay; however, it was three storeys high and it was fenestrated by three and four-light casement windows. The Athelstan Museum was established in the town hall in February 1931 and the fire service relocated from the town hall to a new fire station in Gloucester Road in 1948.

The town hall continued to serve as the headquarters of the borough council for much of the 20th century, but ceased to be the local seat of government when the enlarged North Wiltshire District Council was formed in 1974. After that, it became the meeting place of Malmesbury Town Council. The Athelstan Museum relocated to new premises in Gloucester Road, which were opened by Earl of Shelburne in April 1975, but returned to the town hall just four years later when concerns were raised about the structural integrity of the Gloucester Road building. The town hall continued to operate as a local events venue and performers at that time included the American country music singer, Patsy Montana.

Queen Elizabeth II, accompanied by the Duke of Edinburgh, visited the town hall and had lunch with civic leaders on 7 December 2001. The town council acquired the building from North Wiltshire District Council for a nominal sum in April 2006. An extensive programme of refurbishment works, which included expansion of the information centre, new space for the Athelstan Museum, an additional gallery area and a new café, was completed in 2009. Since then the building has continued to serve as a significant public events venue in the town: recent performers have included the singer, Anita Harris, in May 2022.

== Athelstan Museum ==
The museum contains a collection of artefacts of local interest including items relating to King Æthelstan, who was buried in Malmesbury Abbey, the Benedictine monk, Eilmer of Malmesbury, and the former local member of parliament, Walter Powell. Other items include the Malmesbury Hoard dating from the 4th century, and a set of silver pennies which were struck in the local mint. Works of art in the museum include a painting by J. M. W. Turner depicting Malmesbury Abbey, which was purchased with support from the Art Fund and the National Lottery Heritage Fund in 2019, and a drawing by Thomas Rowlandson depicting Market Day in Malmesbury, which was purchased in 2022.
