= St Padarn's Church, Llanbadarn Fawr =

Coordinates: 52.409°N 4.061°W

St Padarn's Church
- Eglwys Sant Padarn
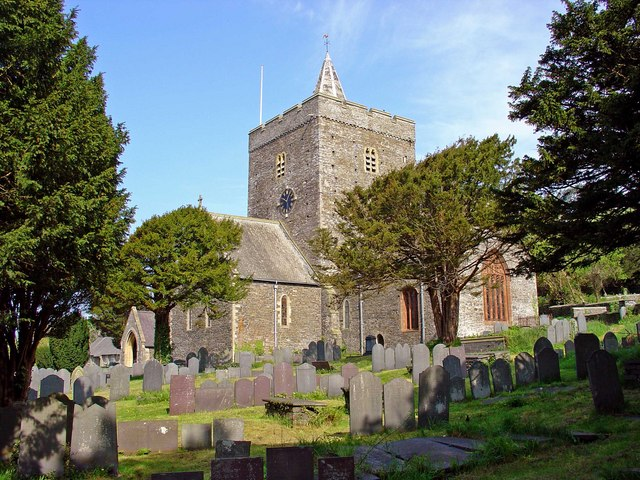
- St Padarn's Church
- St Padarn's Church
- OS grid reference: SN 599 809
- Location: Llanbadarn Fawr, Ceredigion
- Country: Wales
- Denomination: Church in Wales
- Previous denomination: Catholic

History
- Dedication: Saint Padarn

Architecture
- Functional status: Active
- Heritage designation: Grade I listed building (9832)
- Designated: 21 January 1964
- Years built: 1257

Administration
- Diocese: Diocese of St Davids
- Archdeaconry: Cardigan
- Deanery: Llanbadarn Fawr
- Parish: Llanbadarn Fawr and Elerch and Penrhyncoch and Capel Bangor

Saint Padarn's Church is a parish church of the Church in Wales, and the largest mediaeval church in mid-Wales. It is at Llanbadarn Fawr, near Aberystwyth, in Ceredigion, Wales.

Founded in the early sixth century, St Padarn's Church has gone through many changes, from a Welsh monastic centre (a clas), a Benedictine priory, a clas again, a royal rectory, a church controlled by Chester's Vale Royal Abbey, and since 1538 a parish church under a vicar.

== History ==
Although its origins are obscure, the site of the present ancient church has been used for Christian worship since it was settled in the early sixth century, probably by Saint Padarn, after whom it was named. Much of the early history of the church must remain speculative rather than definitive, due to the absence of documentary or archaeological evidence. However, there are certain elements which are reasonably clear.

=== Origins of the foundation in the sixth century ===
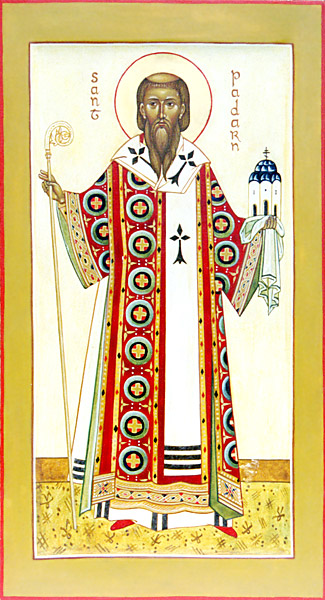
St Padarn, as portrayed in an Orthodox icon. It is likely that St Padarn, if indeed a bishop, would have worn chasuble, stole and girdle, over the alb (the long white coat), a cappa (long black cloak) or (coloured) cope, a crown-like mitre and a pallium. There is a good chance he carried a crozier, and may also have worn a pectoral cross, around his neck.

Whilst the exact date Saint Padarn founded the church is uncertain, it seems clear however that Llanbadarn Fawr was an early sixth-century foundation, a Celtic clas church. The church may have been the seat of an abbot or bishop during the years immediately following Saint Padarn, who was traditionally said to be its first bishop (as a clas church, it was not a cathedral as we understand the term today, but closer to a collegiate church), nor did it necessarily possess any substantial buildings. It was one of the leading clasau of early Christian Wales, and the one we know most about, partly because of the significant role it played as a literary centre.

=== Saint Padarn ===
Very little is known of Saint Padarn (or Paternus to use his Latin name), and almost nothing with any degree of certainty; the earliest literary reference to him is by Rhygyfarch in about 1097. However, it is possible to construct a general outline of his life from the little that we do have.

Following the general custom of Europe in the late classical and early Middle Ages, he was popularly recognised after his death as a saint, along with several hundred other Welsh men and women. But the date and circumstances of the foundation of the church, and of Padarn's life were long forgotten when it was decided in the twelfth century that he should be commemorated in a Vita or Latin Life, following the example of the Life of St David written at Llanbadarn about 1090. That in turn had followed a European tradition of writing such lives. They are not biographies as we understand them today. Instead they were hagiographies, designed to elevate the saint's status as a holy person of miraculous achievements.

Traditionally Padarn was said to come originally from Brittany, but he may have come from south-east Wales. He was said to be both abbot and bishop (the distinction was not so great then as it later became) for many years, and from his base at what is now known as Llanbadarn Fawr (great or high church of St Padarn) he evangelised the neighbouring countryside.

Little more can be said of Padarn, though he later attracted the usual hagiography, the Vita Sancti Paternus, which recounts many supposed details of his life. He may have been more closely associated with late Romano-British civilization than some other early British saints, as his dedications are apparently connected by Roman roads. Llanbadarn Fawr is reputed to be close to where the Roman road from North to South Wales (called Sarn Helen) crosses the river Rheidol. Sarn Helen passes close to Strata Florida and Llanddewi Brefi which, along with Llanbadarn Fawr, were the three most important ecclesiastic places in mediaeval Ceredigion.

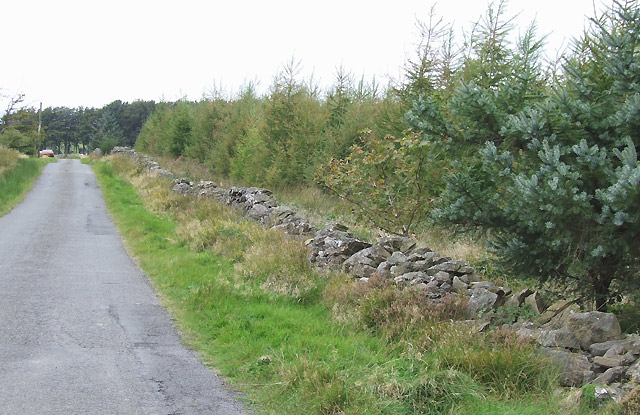
A section of the Roman road, Sarn Helen, in Ceredigion

According to tradition, Padarn continued to preside over his see for twenty-one years, during which time he was said to have erected a number of churches and founded several monasteries in the province or lordship of Ceredigion, later Cardiganshire (and in modern times once again known as Ceredigion), where he placed colonies of monks from the principal establishment at Llanbadarn Fawr. His preaching throughout west Wales was attested to in the Welsh Triads. At the end of that period, possibly being recalled to Brittany, where he was made bishop of Vannes (though it is more than likely that this was a distinct individual), he was succeeded as abbot of the church at Llanbadarn Fawr and bishop of the proto-diocese, which was subsequently called, after its first bishop, "Paternensis," by Cynog. It has been suggested that St Padarn himself may have been buried on Bardsey Island, the legendary "Island of 20,000 saints". But as with any detail of his life, we cannot be certain. Gildas's De Excidio et Conquestu Britanniae is, with Saint Patrick's somewhat earlier Confessio, almost the only contemporary source for this period.

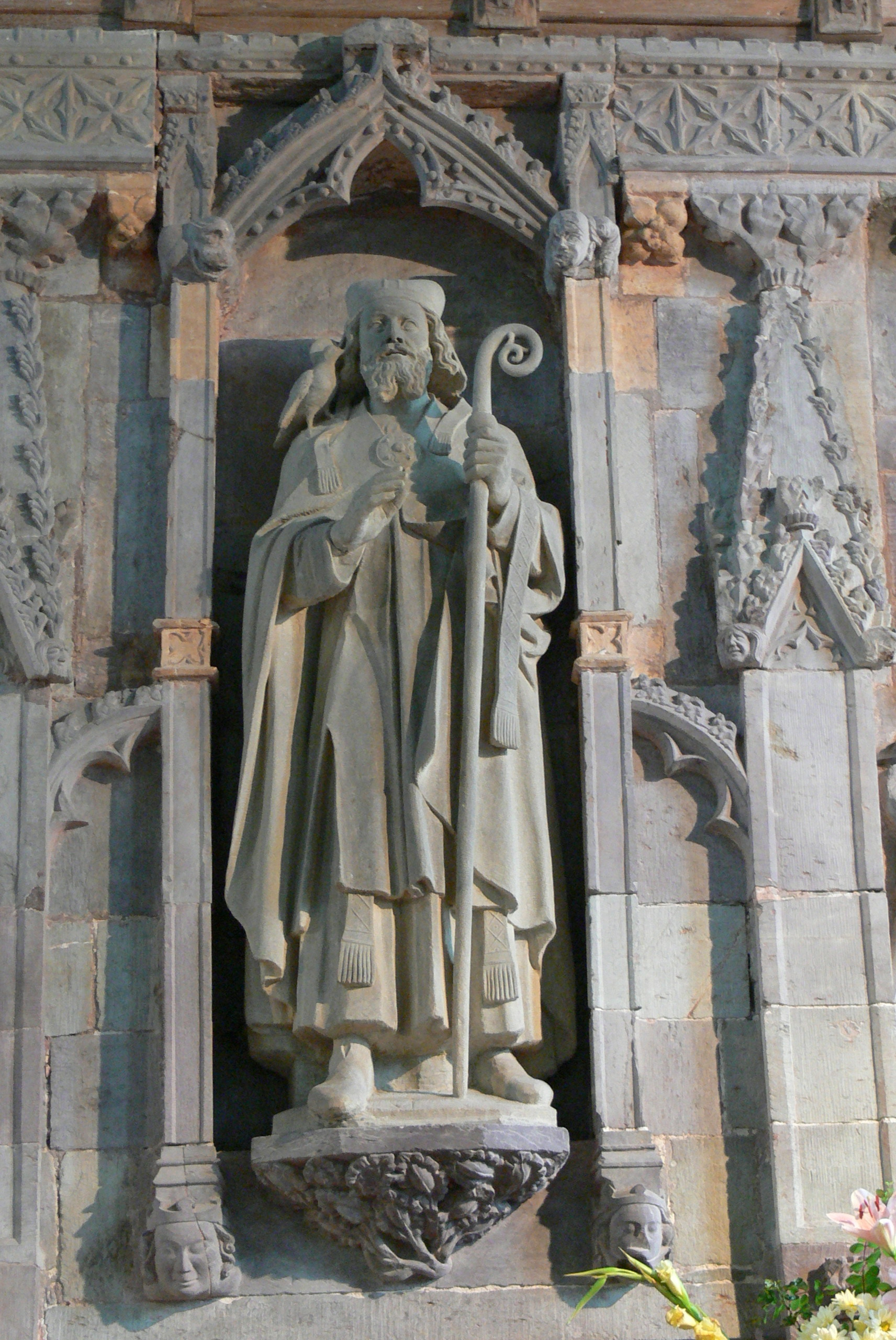
Statue of St David at St Davids Cathedral

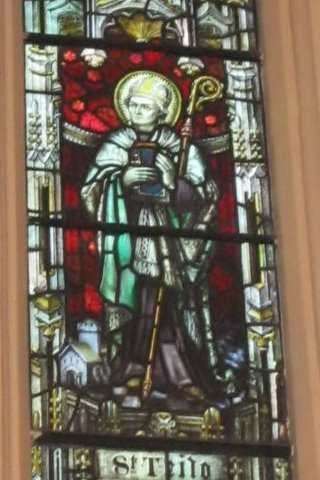
Window of St Teilo in Holy Trinity Church, Abergavenny

=== Padarn's Life ===
The anonymous author tells us that Padarn's parents were nobly born Armoricans (Bretons), and that he sailed to Britain with 847 monks to settle and build a monastery. He established monasteries and churches throughout Ceredigion. The attempt of Maelgwn, king of Gwynedd, to ruin Padarn rebounds on him through a miracle, and he compensates Padarn with the gift of lands between the rivers Rheidol and Clarach. Saint Padarn is closely associated with Saint David and Saint Teilo in a pilgrimage to Jerusalem in which the three are honoured by the Patriarch. Padarn was given a tunic – which later featured in the best known legend associated with him – and a staff. Most likely this account is fabricated, as are much of the details of the lives of the early saints, from a variety of sources, real and imagined.

In the most celebrated episode of the Vita Sancti Paternus, King Arthur tries to steal St Padarn's tunic. King Arthur covets Padarn's tunic, and when he is refused, stamps the earth, at which Padarn calls on the earth to swallow him; it does so. Arthur has to beg forgiveness before he is released. This seems to borrow the story of a different Padarn, Padarn Redcoat, whose coat was one of the Thirteen Treasures of the Island of Britain (Tri Thlws ar Ddeg Ynys Prydain). This story takes place about a century before Saint Padarn; it is, however, important because of the link drawn between Saint Padarn and the Romano-British King Arthur, the legendary British leader of the late fifth and early sixth centuries.

There follow confusing episodes involving Brittany (sometimes called Letia). Padarn finally leaves for France, where he dies, but his remains are brought back and buried in Vannes. A final chapter tells how Padarn, David and Teilo divide south Wales into three episcopates, with Padarn as bishop of Ceredigion. Then, convinced by a miracle performed by Padarn, a local governor called Eithir is persuaded to give land between the rivers Rheidol and Paith to Padarn. The lands owned by Llanbadarn in the twelfth century were between the rivers Rheidol and Clarach. The Paith is a minor tributary of the River Ystwyth. The obscure figure of Eithyr is commemorated in the farm name of Llaneithr, which stands a mile east of Devil's Bridge near the river Mynach.

The Life is difficult to follow and extremely vague on any facts. Typically the author takes facts and traditions known to him and transfers them to the saint himself. Thus there was in the twelfth century a holy relic at Llanbadarn believed to have been Padarn's staff, Cyrwen, which could well be the origin of the place name Llangorwen. The writer obviously knew very little indeed about Padarn, except that he was seen as a contemporary of David and Teilo, who certainly lived during the sixth century.

We must live with our virtually complete ignorance of Padarn's life. It is fair to say, however, that if he had died at Llanbadarn there would have been a shrine, traditions of which would have survived for centuries; none are recorded. Therefore, we can see him as one of the more peripatetic of the missionaries of this period, who spent sufficient time in the Rheidol valley to attract a community of Christian men to him which was sufficiently strong to survive his departure. It could have been these followers in subsequent generations who would have established churches in the saint's name in mid-Wales (Llanbadarn Fynydd, Llanbadarn Garreg), and in Ceredigion (Llanbadarn Odwyn, Llanbadarn Trefeglwys [also known as Llanbadarn Fach]), if he didn't establish them himself.

=== The see of Llanbadarn ===
Like so much else, this is hard to say, but the balance of historians' judgements is that there may well have been bishops based in Llanbadarn for a period, or even periods, in Celtic times. Church organisation in early medieval (pre-1100) Wales was flexible, and there were no fixed dioceses. The claim in Padarn's Life that he was bishop of Ceredigion reflects a tradition, but the actual area of the saint's influence was in north Ceredigion and what is now Radnorshire (mid-Powys). Ceredigion south of the river Wye was David country. Some time after this the church is said to have lost its episcopal privileges. The church is thought to have been annexed, after the dissolution of the see, to that of St Davids; although as with much of the early history this is uncertain. Bishops at this time were, in Wales, rather more itinerant than they later became, and diocesan boundaries much more fluid than they were later. Gerald of Wales (Gerald de Barri, better known as Giraldus Cambrensis), reported that he had been told that the bishopric had been lost because at some time past Llanbadarn's bishop had been murdered and the church lands appropriated by his killers, the forerunners of the clas which held the church at the time of his visit in 1188.

=== The flourishing of Llanbadarn Fawr ===
The see, if such it may be called, appears to have existed for a century, if indeed it didn't come into existence in the years after Padarn himself. There is note of a bishop of Llanbadarn in the minutes of a synod held at Abberley, Worcestershire, in about the year 603, though this is an unreliable source. Reportedly, at this meeting, there was an unsuccessful attempt by the Archbishop of Canterbury, St Augustine of Canterbury, to persuade Celtic bishops – Llanbadarn Fawr was one of seven present – to submit to his authority. Certainly the reputation of Padarn and the wealth and influence of his clas, ensured that the developing cultus of David did not prevail in northern Ceredigion, possibly in large part due to the extensive lands possessed by the clas, apparently from the river Clarach to the river Rheidol. In some cases, as in the Life of Saint Padarn, the Lives tell how the saint gains lands which as the time of writing were claimed by the saint's foundation as its endowment.

Even if much of the history of Saint Padarn and the early years of his church cannot be relied upon as accurate (and there is evidence that it conflates several near-contemporary individuals), there can be no doubt of his importance as one of the leading evangelists of Wales in the early sixth century, and the ongoing importance of his clas.

The clas church remained important after 601, although the "Gwentian" version of the Brut y Tywysogion (Chronicle of the Princes) records that the diocese of Llanbadarn was ravaged by the Saxons in 720. It may have been this that led to the loss of its bishop, however this is very uncertain as the entry is probably a much later forgery by Iolo Morganwg. Traditionally, however, the loss of the episcopal status was as a result of the violent conduct of the inhabitants, who killed their bishop. According to this tradition, having offended a local leader in a feud, Idnertha, who was then bishop of Llanbadarn, was killed, and subsequently buried in Llanddewi Brefi. The date of this event is very unclear. Some sources have Idnertha as the bishop of Llanbadarn at the synod in 603, others have him as being killed by the Saxons 100 years later.

All we can be certain of is that, if there was a bishop of Llanbadarn in 601 – and possibly 720 – there appears to have been none in later years (though note the later use of the style "bishop" during Gerald of Wales's visit in 1188). But that did not diminish the power and influence of the clas at Llanbadarn Fawr. By the middle of the ninth century the clas was clearly the wealthiest in the province. The renowned Asser, scholar and adviser to Alfred the Great, King of Wessex, may have been educated at Llanbadarn Fawr. If this is correct it would be a strong indication that Llanbadarn's reputation for learning was well-founded.

=== The Later Celtic period and the dominance of Sulien and his family ===
Records become more certain by the tenth century. Violence was endemic in medieval Europe, not excepting Wales. During the tenth and eleventh centuries the coasts of Wales were frequently raided by the Vikings. In 987/988 the clas was destroyed by the Danes, but the worst to suffer was St Davids, with attacks in 1073, 1080 and 1091. In 989 Maredudd ab Owain raised a poll tax to bribe the Danes to stay away from Llanbadarn (a tribute was levied of one penny for every man within his dominions, which, in Welsh, was called Glwmaen, or the tribute of the black army). However, in 1038 the church was reduced to ashes by Gruffydd ap Llywelyn, who wrested it from the hands of prince Hywel ab Edwin, whilst subjugating Ceredigion. The lands were ravaged and the area depopulated, though the clas survived. Gruffydd ap Llywelyn seems to have held the area until his death in 1063.

At this period the Llanbadarn community was dominated by Sulien (1011–91) and his remarkable family. Around 1055 Sulien, who was born into a family educated for many generations in the clas monastic school or college of Llanbadarn Fawr, returned there after five years study in Scotland and ten years study in Ireland (according to his son and biographer). After this time Llanbadarn Fawr became possibly the foremost place of learning in Wales. Sulien went on to be known as Sulien the Wise. He became the abbot of Llanbadarn Fawr and served as Bishop of St Davids twice. Under his abbacy Llanbadarn Fawr's monastic library grew in size and importance; reputedly larger than those of Canterbury Cathedral and York Minster.

Later Sulien, now Bishop of St Davids (he was bishop 1073–1078 and 1080–1086), himself took refuge at Llanbadarn Fawr from the Vikings who were raiding St Davids. Many of the bishops were murdered by raiders and marauders, including Bishop Morgeneu I (also known as Morgenveth, Morgeney, Uregeneu) in 999 and Bishop Abraham (who had been newly elected to succeed Sulien) in 1080.

In the time of Sulien and his sons and grandsons the clas at Llanbadarn Fawr was an important scriptorium where texts were composed and copied. Rhygyfarch or Rhigyfarch, who was Sulien's eldest son, and may have succeeded him as Bishop of St Davids (after Sulien's second time in post), wrote, surely at his father's request, his Vita Davidis or Life of St David (later translated into Welsh as Buchedd Dewi) c.1081 – c.1090. Clearly the book was intended to promote the restoration of the damaged see, especially in the face of the Norman challenge. Rhygyfarch and his brother Ieuan were both fine poets in Latin. Ieuan copied manuscripts and composed poetry (Ieuan also wrote, in Welsh, a verse to Padarn's staff Cyrwen).

At the same time, produced in Llanbadarn c.1079, the Ricemarch Psalter is one of only two surviving manuscripts certain to have been produced in Wales in the eleventh century.

Although the Brut y Tywysogion (The Chronicle of the Princes), a Latin chronicle of events, which survives in Welsh translations, may have been written at Strata Florida Abbey, it may have been kept in Llanbadarn in the eleventh century, due to Llanbadarn's scriptorium and its reputation as a centre of learning.

In the late eleventh century the church in Wales began to come under Norman influence, but Llanbadarn Fawr still essentially belonged to a Welsh world, that of an early Welsh clas, with its hereditary succession to the abbacy and its married clerics. The Church in Wales only gradually came under the influence of the see of Canterbury (and so of Rome) and even more slowly under its control. Wider political events however were to accelerate this.

=== Llanbadarn and the Normans ===
The Normans arrived in Ceredigion in 1073–1074, and from the early twelfth century Norman political and ecclesiastical influence gradually increased, aided by the appointment, after 1115, of Norman bishops of St Davids. In about the year 1106, Ithel and Madoc, who were in alliance with King Henry I, ravaged all the county of Cardigan, as Ceredigion was called by the Normans, with the exception of Llanbadarn Fawr and Llanddewi Brefi. Nevertheless, Llanbadarn Fawr suffered an attack upon its sanctuary, from which several of Owain ab Madoc's men, who had taken refuge there, were dragged out by force and put to death. But by this time, scarcely a generation after Rhygyfarch was writing his Life of St David, the clas had declined in its spiritual and pastoral life, and its political importance, although its financial position remained strong, due to the substantial revenues of its extensive lands.

In 1110, King Henry I took Cardigan from his appointee Owain ap Cadwgan, son of Cadwgan ap Bleddyn, ostensibly as punishment for a number of crimes including that of the rape and abduction of his cousin Nest, wife of Gerald de Windsor and ward of King Henry I. In turn Henry gave the Lordship of Cardigan (as the Normans called Ceredigion), including Cardigan Castle, to Gilbert fitz Richard, Earl of Clare, who imposed a string of castles through the lordship.

As potent as the military power of the Normans from the 1070s were the ideas and practices introduced into Wales, particularly in the sphere of ecclesiastical affairs; these were adopted and adapted by the native elites.

=== The short-lived Benedictine priory ===
Between 1111 and 1117 the ancient clas church was granted by Gilbert fitz Richard to St Peter's Abbey, Gloucester (a Benedictine house), as a cell or priory of St Peter's Abbey. This may have meant the construction of a stone church, perhaps the first on the site; a new tower and porch were built. It is not clear whether the Celtic monks and priests (married and single) were expelled, or whether they were joined by brethren of a new sort. A few years later, in 1141, Ewenny Priory, in the Vale of Glamorgan, was founded as a priory of St Peter's Abbey, Gloucester. As with Llanbadarn, there was a pre-existing church, in this case definitely one in stone, and probably dating from the 1120s, as it was consecrated 1126 by Bishop Urban of Llandaff.

The monks were in residence for scarcely twenty years. Llanbadarn would have been a simple or obedientiary priory, a dependency of the abbey. The superior of such a priory, who was subject to the abbot in everything, was called a "prior." These monasteries were satellites of the mother abbey. In light of earlier activities at Llanbadarn, it is worth noting that the forty-eighth rule of Saint Benedict prescribes extensive and habitual holy reading for the brethren. However, Benedictine monks were disallowed worldly possessions, thus necessitating the preservation and collection of sacred texts in monastic libraries for communal use. One of the key Benedictine practices was copying sacred texts, so it might be expected that the monks created a scriptorium, if indeed one hadn't survived from the time of Sulien and his sons and grandsons.

Benedictine monastic life at Llanbadarn Fawr was short-lived. First the princes of Gwynedd and then those of Deheubarth expelled the Normans, driving the English monks away when they re-conquered Ceredigion in 1136, after a victory against the Normans at Crug Mawr, following the death of King Henry I in 1135.

Little is known of events over the next 45 years. However, it seems likely that the Celtic monks returned to their old clas.

=== The restored clas in transition ===
The church seems to have been restored as a clas or re-founded as a college of secular priests (a collegiate church) before 1144, but the heyday of the clas churches had passed. Gloucester Abbey tried to recover the church in 1175 and again in 1251, and even appealed to the Pope, but without success. The ancient clas establishment seems to have re-emerged from the brief period of the priory, for mention occurs in the Welsh annals, in the year 1137, of the death of John (Ieuan), arch-priest or archdeacon of Llanbadarn, who could have been none other than Ieuan ap Sulien, of the great line of Sulien. In the twelfth century clas churches were led by an abod with clergy under an "archpresbyter" (archoffeiriad).

In the same record, in the year 1146, the death of Sulien ab Rhygyfarch, "a man of great knowledge, and one of the college of Llanbadarn", is noted. By this time, after the loss of the Gloucester link, the church was again in the hands of a lay abbot; the use of the title abbot did not mean that the church was an abbey.

But despite the continuity – or perhaps because of it – all was apparently not well. In 1188 Gerald of Wales accompanied Baldwin of Forde, Archbishop of Canterbury, on a tour of Wales, the primary object being a recruitment campaign for the Third Crusade, a secondary one to establish his authority over the whole Welsh church. Gerald's vivid account of the journey is the first great European travel book. Gerald visited Llanbadarn Fawr, and described the college of secular canons under a lay abbot (Ednowain "bishop of Llanbadarn"), in not especially flattering terms; it should be remembered that Gerald was a zealous reformer, critical of anything of which he disapproved, as he did of Llanbadarn: the abbot was described as "a certain old man, waxen old in iniquity". The account of his visit was subsequently published in the Itinerarium Cambriae (1191), and was followed by the Descriptio Cambriae in 1194.

Gerald tells us further that a Breton knight had come to the church for Mass and found a band of about twenty young men, all armed and equipped according to the local custom. He asked "which was the abbot, and they pointed out to him a man with a long spear in his hand, who was walking in front of the others". He then tells the story of the murder of a bishop of Llanbadarn, murdered by the predecessors of the present generation of clergy. We cannot be sure how much of this was true. But Gerald disapproved of married clergy (which had been declining generally though only finally abolished by Rome in the eleventh century and deplored in principle the inheritance of church office. But all he tells us of Llanbadarn is hearsay, apart from the name of the abbot. In any case, no move was made by Archbishop Baldwin in favour of reform: the Lord Rhys was with them, and they would not have wished to offend him. In any event, it would have been a matter for the Bishop of St Davids, who was Peter de Leia. There is then no further information about Llanbadarn for nearly sixty years.

=== The decline of the clas or college ===
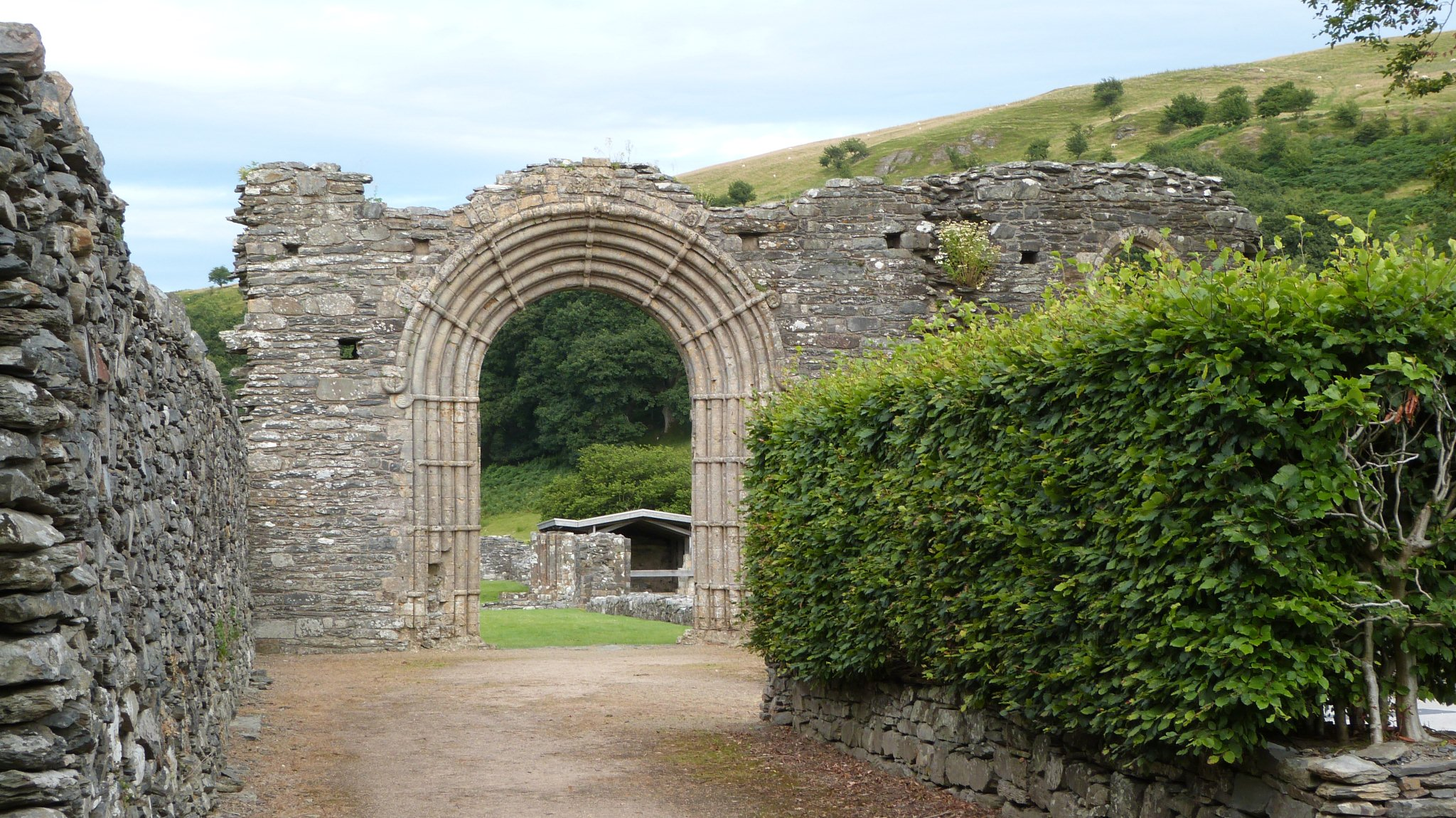
Strata Florida Abbey, the Cistercian house that was to attract patronage from the princes away from Llanbadarn

The Normans briefly returned to power in the 1160s, and before Rhys ap Gruffudd expelled them c.1189 they had begun the foundation of the Cistercian abbey at Strata Florida, carried on by Rhys. The Cistercians enjoyed great prestige in Wales, and Llanbadarn Fawr was eclipsed as a centre of Welsh culture. The monks took over the Chronicle of the Princes and began the copying of major Welsh manuscripts.

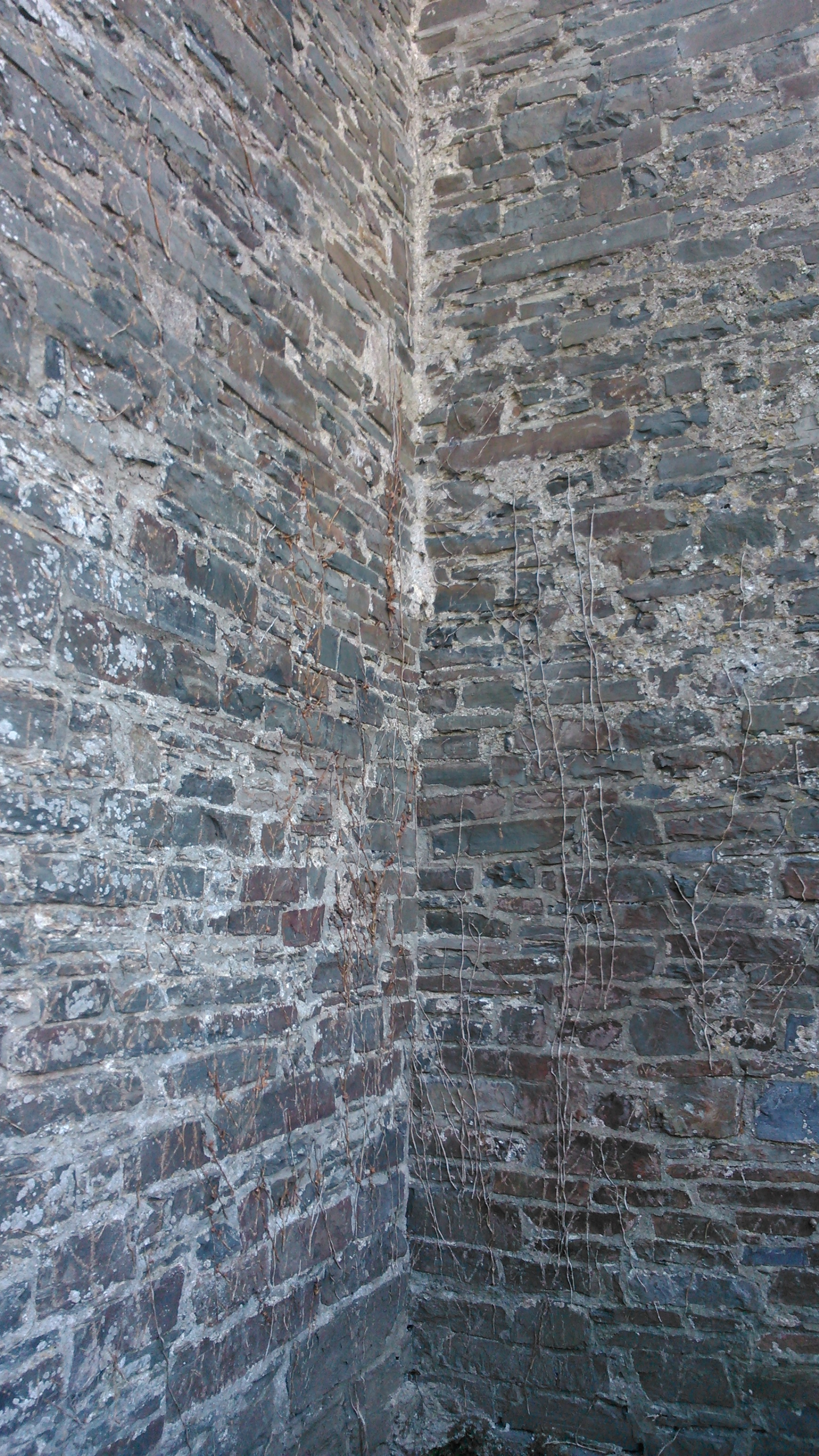
Angle of north transept and nave west wall

Welsh rule was briefly interrupted in 1211 when royal forces again seized Aberystwyth, but control was soon regained by the Welsh under the aegis of Llywelyn the Great, and so it remained until Welsh power collapsed in 1246. Between 1231 and 1247 the church was divided between St Peter's Abbey in Gloucester and St Davids Cathedral, with the requirement of the provision of a vicarage (that is, a living for a vicar), but it had passed to the Crown by 1251. If there was a vicarage at the time of the taxatio, it was perhaps the individual rector who presented to it. King Henry III appropriated the advowson of the church, when he seized the lands of Maelgwn ap Maelgwn, called Maelgwn Fychan, the son of Maelgwn ap Rhys, possibly to help pay the construction costs of the new church, though the seizure was contrary to the Gloucester Abbey claims and Gilbert fitz Richard's charters. Henry III's officials controlled Aberystwyth, and it was probably then that the building of the present church began. That it was a royal project is suggested by the very size of the building. The advowson – or right of presentation – was to remain in the hands of the Crown from 1246 to 1360,

The church was now under a rector, who replaced the lay abbot; and any remaining priests of the clas and their abod were presumably expelled. If one accepts the evidence of the inquisition taken before Rhys ap Gruffydd, lieutenant of the Justiciar, at Llanfihangel Genau'r Glyn, 1 September 1326 (which conflicts with Gerald's account), as early as 1212 there were apparently only two monks (from St Peter's, Gloucester) in residence. However, it is difficult to see how they can have remained, in light of Welsh control of the area; possibly they had only arrived in 1211; we don't know whether there was a priest resident (one of the monks might have been a priest).

Despite the splendidly sized new building (albeit a plain one), the church declined in status as the college gradually died. It is possible that the community ceased in 1212, when the Gloucester monks were killed by the locals; we don't know whether they were replaced. Nor do we know whether the clas resumed after Llywelyn the Great retook the area. Community life probably ended with the appointment of a rector by King Henry III in 1246, although this latter is not conclusive; a college might be headed by a rector, although they were usually styled provost. There have been suggestions that there were one or more chantry chapels, which could suggest the presence of more than one priest.

Surprisingly, perhaps, the tithes were administered locally by a Welshman, Gwilym ap Gwrwared, who was probably grandfather of famed bard Dafydd.

The church was said to have been rebuilt, after serious fire damage, around 1257–1265, though whether this was a rebuilding, or a continuation of work commenced after 1246, is unclear. It is not inconceivable that the fire damage was caused when, in 1256, Llywelyn ap Gruffydd, with a large army, seized Llanbadarn Fawr from Norman control. Edmund Crouchback, Earl of Lancaster, son of King Henry III and brother of King Edward I, was Lord of Cardigan from 1265. Given the size of the church it is probable that construction took many years, even if it were not interrupted. If it commenced in 1246 it is quite conceivable that work was not complete until 1265, or later.

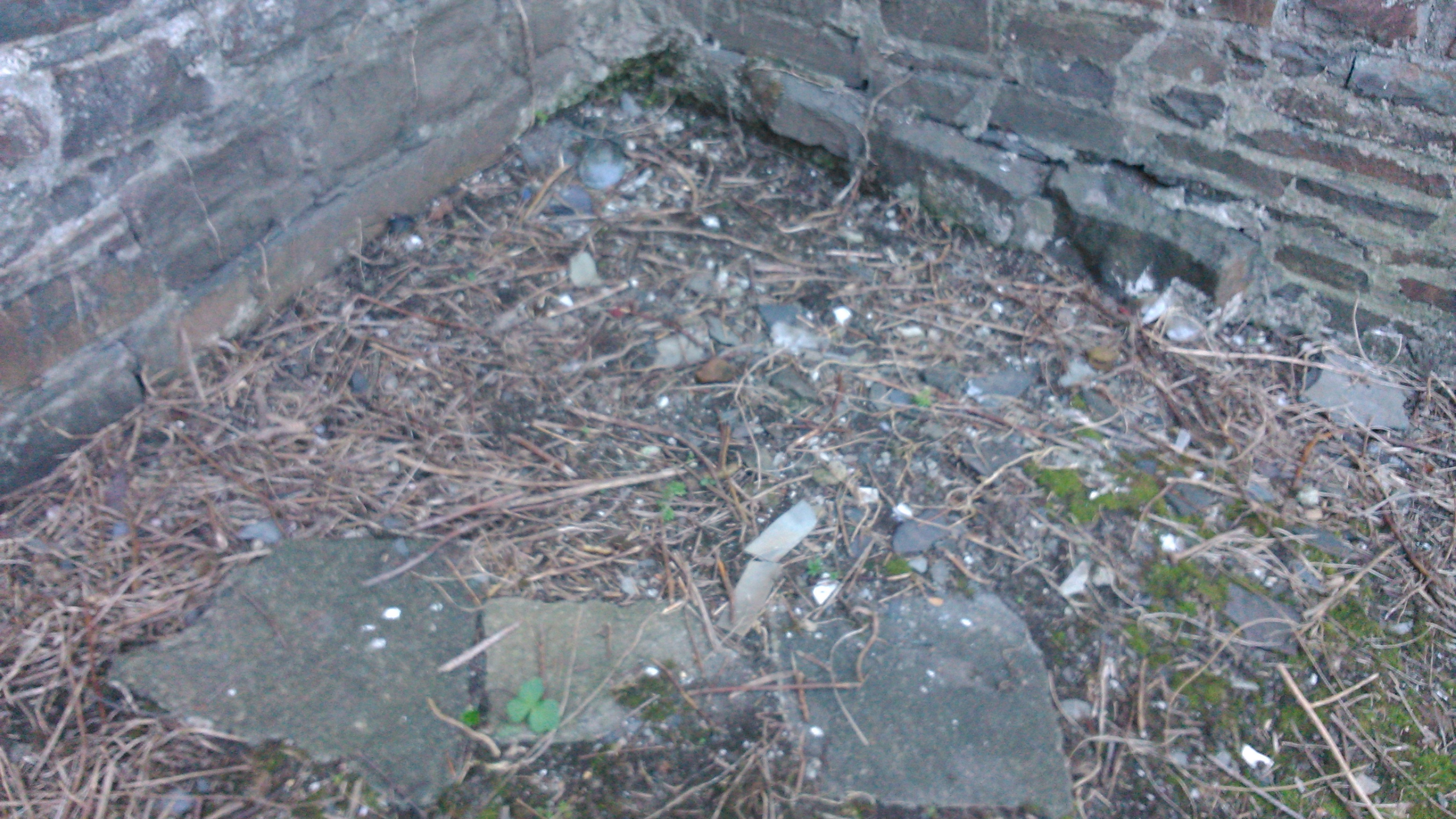
North transept, western angle to nave, showing apparent foundations of a former structure

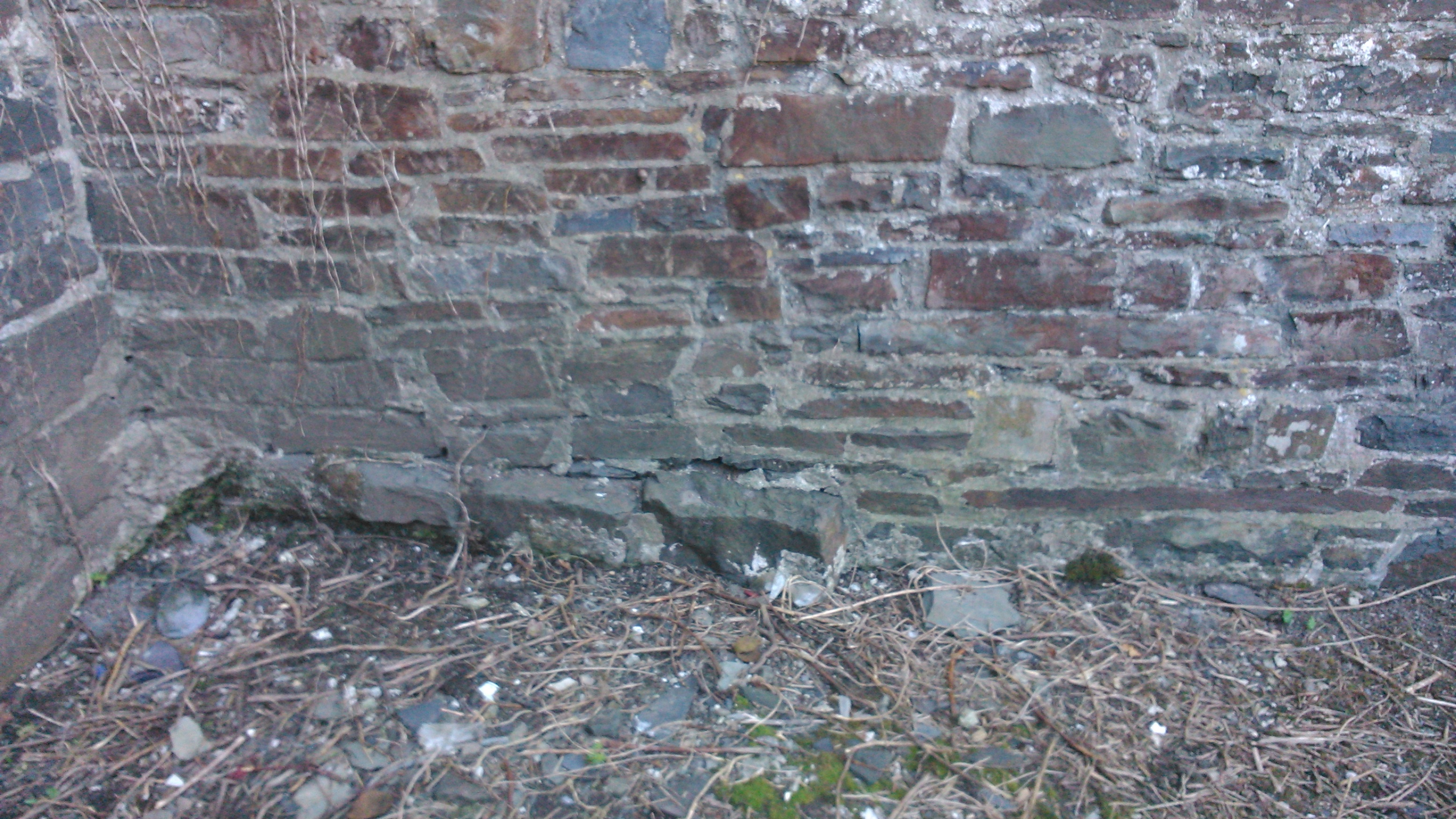
Nave wall by north transept, north west side, showing base of possible structure

The rectors were almost all royal favourites or up-and-coming ecclesiastical leaders, who would have rarely visited the church. Perhaps the most notable of the rectors at this time was Antony Bek, who held the living from 1277 to 1284. He was brother to Thomas Bek, Bishop of St Davids 1280–93. Antony Bek became Bishop of Durham and Patriarch of Jerusalem, but was more noted as a warrior than for his piety.

Llanbadarn Fawr was the focus of the English forces assembled in south Wales against the insurrection of Rhys ab Meredydd in 1287. By this time the rector was invariably an absentee cleric; John de Camera, Rector 1329–1334 was also canon of St Davids, Hereford and Abergwili, and was a government clerk. Then, as now, such a large and remote charge invited pluralism and non-residence. There was, at this time, a comparatively small amount in tithes, but the rector was nonetheless equivalent in substance to an abbot, owing to the ownership of extensive lands by Frankalmoin tenure.

From this period we also have the first record of a baptism, of William Knovill, son of John Knovill, King's Bailiff in Aberystwyth, in 1286. Doubtless the surviving twelfth century font was used.

=== The later mediaeval period and the end of conventual life ===
The college survived until it disappeared or was dissolved, certainly before 1361–1362, and probably as early as 1246 or even 1212 (as mentioned above).

In 1346 William Kilsby, rector, died, and King Edward III gave the advowson to his eldest son, the Black Prince. The latter made three presentations. One of these was to Thomas Bradwardine, later briefly Archbishop of Canterbury, who was rector of Llanbadarn Fawr 1347–1349.

The parish continued largely if not wholly a sinecure for its rector, with the work actually done by a resident vicar; in Bradwardine's case he was concurrently prebend and the dean of Lincoln, and chaplain and confessor to the King, and probably never visited Llanbadarn Fawr.

Because the church continued to be rich, most of the rectors were well connected clerics, some, like Bradwardine, with distinguished careers. Others were less august – or respectable. One of the rectors, Robert Stretton, who may have succeeded Bradwardine, and was in post by 1353, was nominated Bishop of Coventry and Lichfield in 1359. His appointment was however (unsuccessfully) opposed by the Archbishop of Canterbury on the grounds that Stretton could neither read nor write – a charge that may well have been politically motivated and may have been untrue. Wharton included in Anglia Sacra a continuation of the history of Lichfield by William Whitlocke, which describes Stretton as "eximius vir" – an exceptional man – and goes on to make probably exaggerated claims for his attainments in jurisprudence. Bradwardine was a formidable scholar; Stretton may have been of a more practical bent – he was concurrently Constable of Aberystwyth Castle.

Tradition has it that Dafydd ap Gwilym, one of the greatest of Welsh poets, was born at Brogynin, Penrhyncoch (at the time in Llanbadarn Fawr parish, and now part of the grouped benefice), early in the fourteenth century, when the parish covered the whole of northern Ceredigion. Dafydd records a number of local place-names in his poetry. He is also known for his connection with Strata Florida, thanks to the story that he was buried there, and to the copying of his poetry into Strata Florida manuscripts.

In 1359 the Black Prince gave the advowson to four patrons (or feofees), who, on 7 November 1360 appropriated the church to the Cistercian Vale Royal Abbey, Chester, founded by King Edward I in 1270. The appropriation was confirmed 28 November 1360 by Thomas Fastolf, Bishop of St Davids (a canon lawyer). The ancient church, with its dependent chapels of Castell Gwallter, Llanilar and Llanfihangel y Creuddyn, again became subordinate to another religious house. Thereafter the abbot and convent of Vale Royal became the corporate rector until 1538, with Llanbadarn Fawr left in the hands of a vicar.

The timing could not have been better for the Vale Royal community, for in a storm 19 October 1360 the arcades of the unfinished nave of their abbey church collapsed, and rebuilding could not have been funded by the abbey without outside help; even so, their original ambitious plans were never carried out in full. It has been suggested that the transfer was arranged, after the collapse, in order to provide funds for Vale Royal Abbey to repair their church. However the legal formalities, beginning with the appropriation by the feofees, was too soon after the storm to realistically have been in response to that event. Given that the abbey was already – and remained – in debt, the reason for the appropriation was probably related to that. As corporate rector, Vale Royal Abbey was responsible for appointing a vicar and for the care of the chancel, leaving the rest of the church to be maintained by the parish.

The change in control was not without dispute, however, with both Vale Royal Abbey and St Peter's Abbey, Gloucester claiming the valuable church advowson. Legal action dragged on for some years, before Vale Royal Abbey ultimately prevailed. Control was also challenged by the Crown itself in 1398, and by Strata Florida Abbey in 1435. Vale Royal found keeping the appropriated church difficult, with the locals being at times difficult (for reasons that were not hard to discover).

=== The extension of the chancel under Vale Royal Abbey ===
Even though it was subordinate to Vale Royal Abbey, the church at Llanbadarn Fawr remained important in its own right. The building was actually substantially extended in 1475, with the construction of a large new sanctuary. There was also a Rood screen and loft, with a carved image of Christ crucified, with the figures of Mary and St John either side, though this is now gone, although the steps to the loft may still be seen to the north side of the chancel.

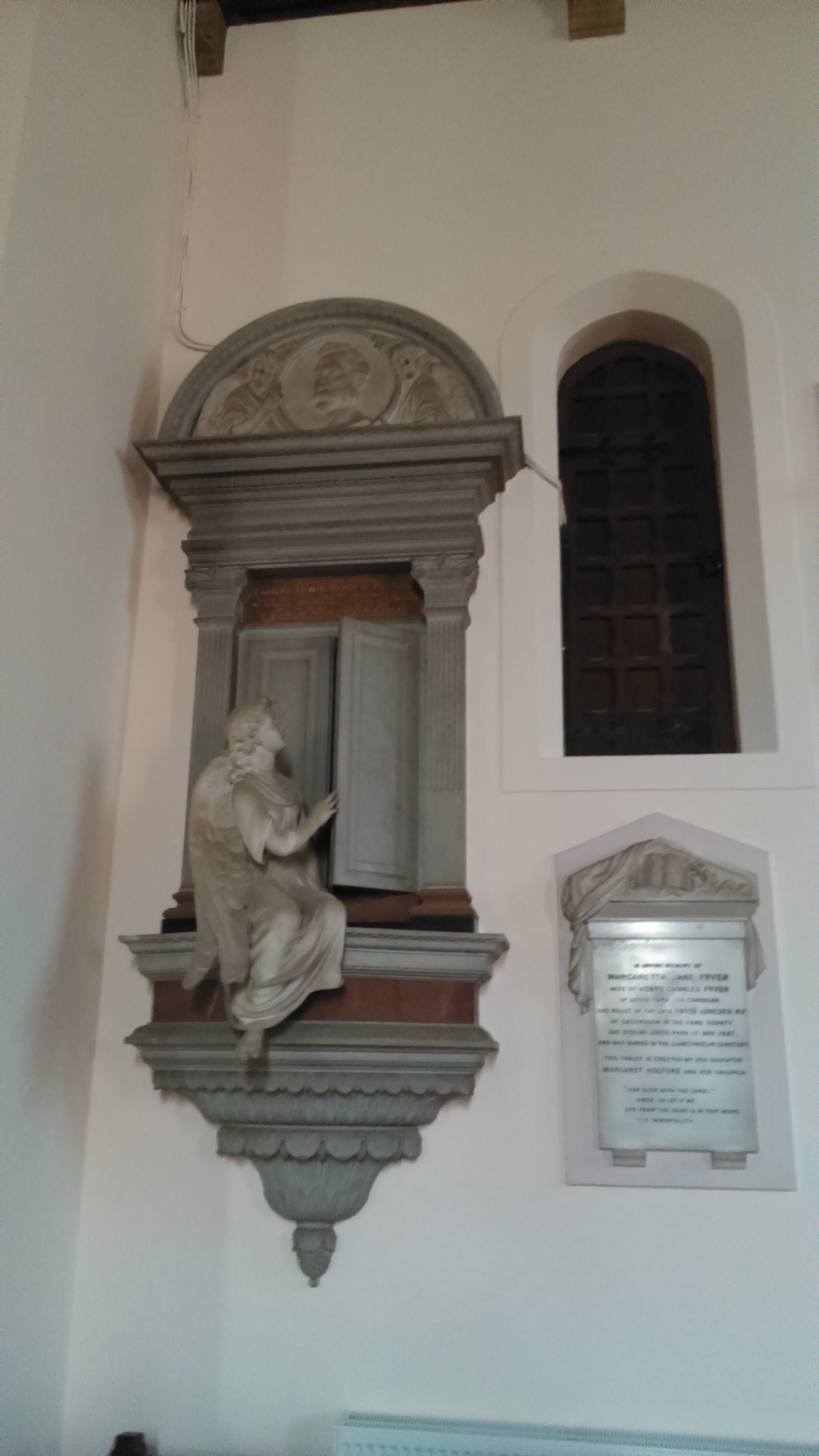
Monuments in chancel, and entrance to roof loft, Llanbadarn Fawr church

Whenever it occurred, the long succession of monks and priests living a corporate (not necessarily monastic) life in the clas, priory and finally college of priests was finally at an end, after many hundreds of years. However, as Nora K. Chadwick has observed: "clerics of Llanbadarn seem to have retained their vitality and intellectual activity down to the fifteenth century". In 1508 a visitation of Vale Royal Abbey by the Abbot of Dore referred to the church and lordship of Llanbadarn Fawr, so the church remained important in the early sixteenth century.

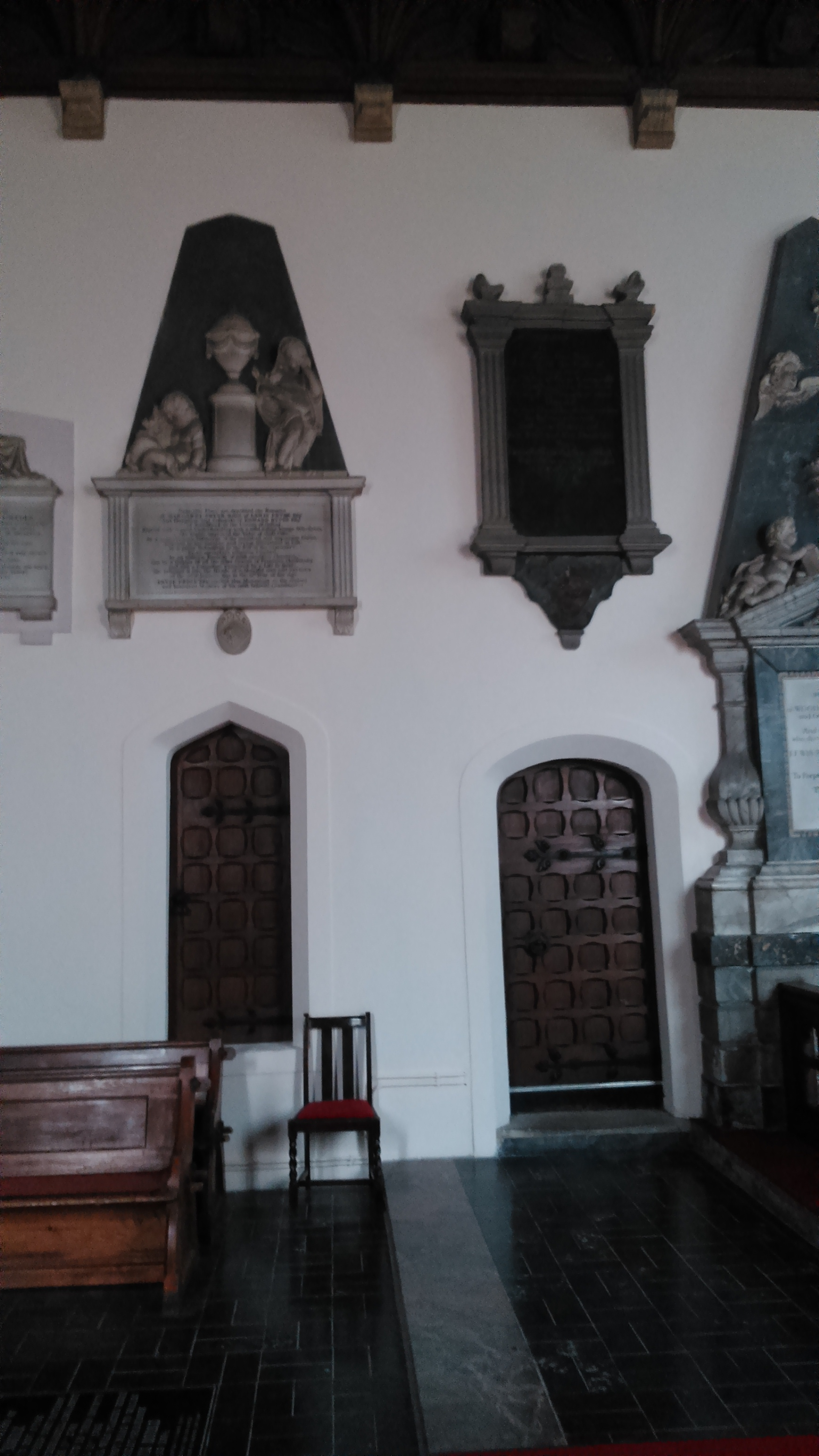
Monuments in the chancel, and entrance to stair leading to the rood loft and the door leading to the vestries, Llanbadarn Fawr Church

After the Dissolution of the Monasteries, and the closure of Vale Royal Abbey in 1538, St Padarn's Church regained its independence, though now solely as a parish church rather than as a religious community. The church remained important in part because the parish was one of the largest in Wales (over 240 square miles). However, although the Abbot of Vale Royal was no longer rector, the church did not recover the tithes, nor the ownership of the lands that had once belonged to the church.

=== The Dissolution of the monasteries and the loss of church assets ===
With Henry VIII’s closure of the monasteries 1536–41, the advowson and tithes of Llanbadarn Fawr became the property of the lay owners. Under the later Stuarts the lordship of Llanbadarn had passed to the Earl of Danby, and the rectory to Sir Robert Holmes. By 1660 the tithes belonged to Roger Palmer (1634–1705), who became earl of Castlemaine by virtue of his wife Barbara (née Villiers) being the mistress of Charles II. Since Castlemaine did not acknowledge Barbara's five children by Charles (and perhaps other lovers) the tithes of Llanbadarn passed to his nephew James. His daughter Catherine married Giles Chichester of Arlington Court, Devon. They were both Catholics, which forced them to pay heavy taxes. Not all subsequent members of the Chichester family were absentees, however; Sir John Chichester, 1st Baronet, of Arlington Court, was High Sheriff of Cardiganshire in 1831, when he was living in Llanbadarn Fawr. But the income was lost to the church. The tithes were not especially valuable; in the eighteenth century the vicarage was worth only £27 annually; in the fourteenth century they were comparatively small compared with the income from the lands then owned by the church – which passed with the manor or lordship, on the Dissolution of the Monasteries, to the lay owners.

The Llanbadarn tithes were not easy to collect: both the fishermen and the farmers of north Cardiganshire strongly resented the payments they had to make in goods, while the goods themselves (fish, corn, farm stock etc.) were not easy to collect and had to be sold for the money to pass to the Chichesters. It was easy for agents and collectors to line their own pockets, and to take advantage of the now-widowed Catherine by withholding their accounts. In 1727, she travelled to Cardiganshire by herself to claim her legal rights and stayed over winter. She then had to do so again in 1730: all her efforts were met with blank refusals and lies. During her long periods of forced residence she witnessed the beaching of ninety porpoises at Aberystwyth which were slaughtered by the local people. Her final journey to Wales in 1734 proved fatal, and she died in the county: a slate memorial to her is still to be seen above the vestry door in Llanbadarn church.

=== Later life as a parish church ===
Even after the Celtic clas, the Norman priory and (possible) later college of priests had ceased to occupy the site, it remained an important educational and cultural centre. William Morgan, later Bishop of Llandaff and of St Asaph, the first translator of the Bible from Greek and Hebrew into Welsh in 1588, was vicar of Llanbadarn Fawr 1572–1575.

The huge extent of the mediaeval parish of Llanbadarn made Sunday worship impossible for distant inhabitants, so early centres with a Christian identity like Llanychaearn and Llaneithr would act as chapels of ease, and later churches whether built by Welsh princes (such as Llanfihangel-y-Creuddyn) or Norman lords (e.g. Llanfihangel Genau'r Glyn) were also subordinate to Llanbadarn before developing as separate parishes. Churches like Llanbadarn with a large hinterland of lesser churches are often known as mam-eglwysi, mother churches. There were no parishes in Wales prior to the coming of the Normans.

In later years, because it was impossible for parishioners to travel to Llanbadarn Fawr from the more distant parts of the parish, the church eventually had many chapels of ease, as the population of the parish grew. One example of the latter is All Saints Church, Llangorwen, which was built in the early 1840s. In the course of the nineteenth century the original parish of Llanbadarn Fawr was finally divided into some 17 new parishes, comprising 20 churches.

During this time the church at Llanbadarn Fawr gradually declined, as the population of Aberystwyth dramatically outgrew the original settlement, and more and more chapels of ease became independent parish churches. By the mid-nineteenth century the fabric of the church had also deteriorated to such an extent that serious remedial work was deemed necessary. Unfortunately, although necessary, this work also swept away much of the detail of the interior of the church. Today, apart from the Celtic crosses and the baptismal font there is nothing mediaeval or even early modern; most of what is visible today is nineteenth century, apart from the structure of the church, and some earlier monuments.

By the turn of the twentieth century the church had little to show from its earlier history, or indeed of its former wealth, beyond the great size of the church. The church was relatively plainly decorated – see below – and had nothing by way of old fittings, plate or vestments. Amongst its liturgical plate were a chalice of 1788, an alms plate of 1839, a set of chalice, paten and flagon of 1841, and a silver mounted glass cruet of 1909.

=== The church today ===
In 2014 the church underwent £100,000 worth of repairs, including the replacement of the obsolete heating system, and replastering and repainting of the internal stonework.

The parish was previously a single parish benefice (under a vicar), but from 2012 it has been in the Benefice of Llanbadarn Fawr and Elerch and Penrhyncoch and Capel Bangor, in the deanery of Llanbadarn Fawr, in the archdeaconry of Cardigan, of the Diocese of St Davids.

The parish, most recently of a central church persuasion, and with a strong choral tradition, generally has separate Welsh and English language services. The Vicar (formally priest-in-charge) is currently the Reverend Andrew Loat, appointed in 2014, after an interregnum from 2008, following the retirement of the Reverend Timothy Morgan (2001–2008), the previous vicar. The Venerable Hywel Jones (vicar 1979–1992) had been cleric with pastoral care 2008–2014.

The church is now part of "Peaceful Places", a heritage tourism trail, which tells the stories of a collection of churches and chapels across North Ceredigion.

=== Organ ===
The church contains a two manual and pedal, 14-stop pipe organ dating from 1885 by Forster and Andrews. A specification can be found on the National Pipe Organ Register.

== Architecture ==
There are no traces of the fabric of the original clas church. Most buildings in the sixth century were of wood, wattle and daub. Even churches were wooden. Although the use of stone was not unknown elsewhere in Britain at this time, it was not used in Wales (it was rare anywhere in Britain until the eleventh century). Churches were also distinguished by their comparatively small size and simplicity. They tended to be under 40 feet long, with a single tall, aisleless nave, and with a small square chancel attached. They were often oratories, rather than full churches.

Even though the early church settlement at Llanbadarn Fawr was comparatively successful and well-endowed, it is unlikely that significant building work was done. The clas church would continue to reflect a strong Celtic form for many years. But even though St Augustine, first Archbishop of Canterbury, failed to extend his authority to the Christians in Wales and Dumnonia at the beginning of the seventh century, the influence of the western church was to begin to be gradually felt. However, even then, the tendency in west Wales was to build larger and larger single cell churches, rather than adopt the newly fashionable basilican design.

The building at Llanbadarn Fawr was greatly injured by the Danes in 988, and again (by Gruffydd ab Llewelyn) in 1038. Portions of an earlier structure were alleged to be included in the present edifice, which is of early English style. This is, however, unlikely, as stone church construction in Wales has been conventionally dated to the twelfth century and later, and the earlier buildings were probably wooden, although we know that a new tower and porch were built around 1115. Much evidence which might have shown whether there was any fabric dating from before the thirteenth century reconstruction, and even as far back as late Celtic (or Romano-British) times, was lost with the extensive late-Victorian reconstruction, particularly of the nave, is hidden beneath the present church, or is in the churchyard.

The present structure has many traces of great antiquity, being large and built in the form of a cross, with a door of early Gothic architecture. The building was probably erected some time after the Norman Conquest, as the plain pointed arch prevails throughout; exactly when we cannot be sure, though possibly after 1246. The earliest visible stonework is thirteenth century, in the tower and the arches supporting it. The external appearance of the church is large and ancient, being erected of rubble stone, with ashlar quoins and windows. The severe appearance and thick walls of the nave suggest Norman architecture, however the presence of pointed lancet windows indicate that it is early Gothic, perhaps from early thirteenth century. Internally the church is in the form of an aisleless cruciform church with substantial transepts. It was rebuilt (or built afresh) in the thirteenth century after a fire, and the chancel extended in the fifteenth century, after which the structure was largely complete as it is seen today.

=== The exterior ===
Externally, there are slate roofs and coped gables with cross finials. The roofs have patterned bands of fishscale Whitland Abbey slates, except on the nave. There are large scale, plain unbuttressed walls without batter for the nave, a nineteenth century south porch, two transepts and a chancel with a nineteenth century addition of a north choir vestry; the dating of the priests' vestry, on the north side of the chancel, is less certain. Externally, the nave downpipes on the south side are dated 1884.

The tower has numerous put-log holes, and is supported on four massive columns and surmounted by a nineteenth century low octagonal broached short slated recessed slated spire with fish-scale slates and weathercock. There are nineteenth century louvred paired cusped bell-lights and a corbelled embattled parapet. The tower contains a fine peal of bells, with the oldest of the original set of six being cast in 1749 by Rudhall bell foundry. Two were added in 1886, when the bell chamber was renovated. Two more were added to mark the new millennium in 2000, when some of the others were recast or tuned. The work was completed by Spring 2001. The tower presents one of the more noticeable views in Aberystwyth. It also contains a south side clock dated 1859.

The church is some 163 feet long.

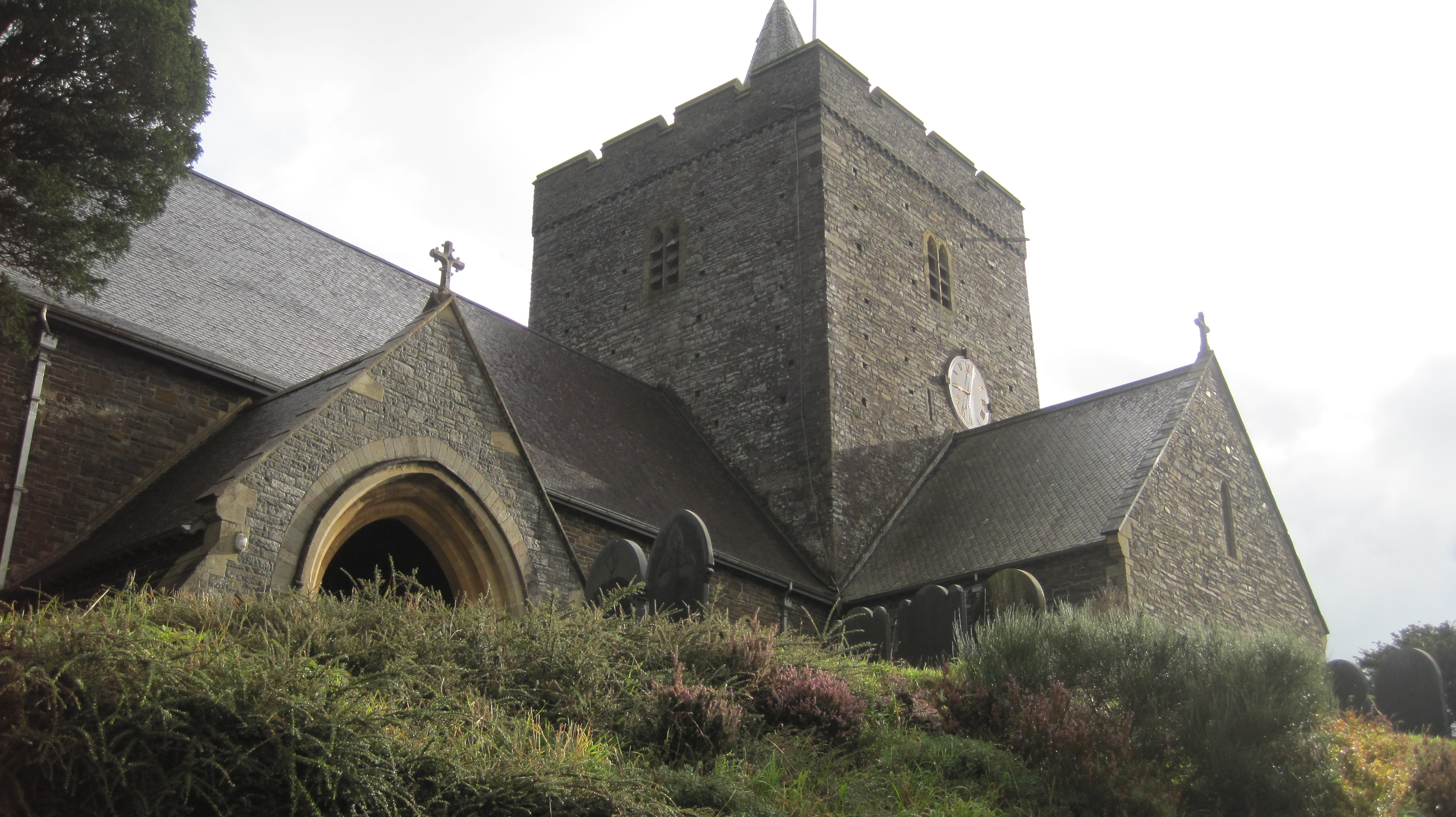
A photograph emphasising the massive tower and transepts

=== The chancel ===
The interior consists of chancel, nave, transepts and south porch, and is formed of rough materials, now largely plastered and whitewashed.

The large chancel was restored around 1475, primarily it would appear by extending it and adding new red sandstone Perpendicular segmental-pointed side windows, one three-light and one single-light to the south and one three-light to the north – all now with nineteenth century tracery and stained glass. The window is Gothic equilateral.

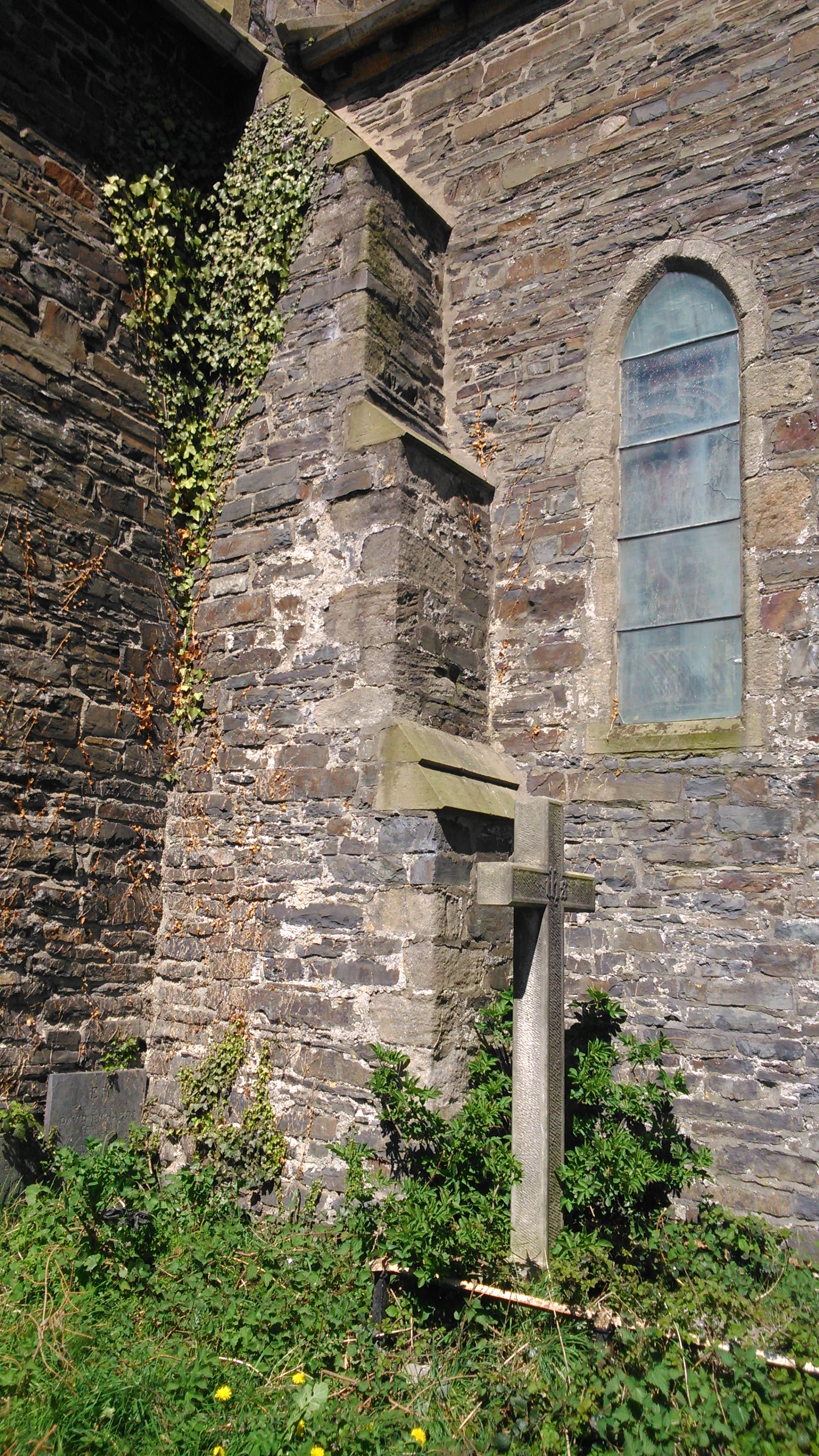
South transept, east side, showing join to crossing and chancel

An inscription in the left side window jamb of the east window in the south wall of the chancel may be a contemporary memorial to William Stratford; it is the word "Stratford", with a coat of arms with a rebus of the letter "W" and an abbot's crozier set behind the "W", with two four-leaved flowers either side. Below this window, now partly obscured by a credence table, is a mediaeval piscina. Another inscription, possibly late fifteenth century, is in the right window jamb of the easternmost north wall window. This is to Thomas ap Dafydd, proctor, and his wife Angharad. The great five-light east window is also of red stone, with nineteenth century late Gothic style tracery.

There is an ornate semi-circular wooden ceiling with smaller panels along the ridge, moulded ribs and carved bosses, and brattished cornice each side above a row of little fan-vaults separating seven half-round panels with shield-bearing angels. The ceiling is finely finished with bosses at the intersection of the moulded principals and purlins. It was inserted in 1882–84.

This ceiling conceals the mediaeval trusses of the fifteenth century ceiling. The wagon roof over the chancel was boarded or plastered, as slots in the principals show, in 1491 by William Stratford, DTh, Abbot of Vale Royal Abbey (in post 1476–1516, with gaps); the exact dating was derived from the timbers, which retain complete sapwood. The original ceiling can still be reached from the ringing chamber in the central tower, and includes an arch-braced collar-beam truss, with traces of five cross-ribs equally spaced on the soffit of the four-centred moulded arch. The truss had slots for the panels of a boarded ceiling (a wagon roof).

The entrance to the chancel from the crossing has a red marble step, with mosaic, and Minton encaustic tile panels of a three-branch lamp, then another marble step and black marble main chancel flooring in small paving slabs. In the sanctuary there are a further three marble steps, with paving of pink marble with black in square or zigzag patterns.

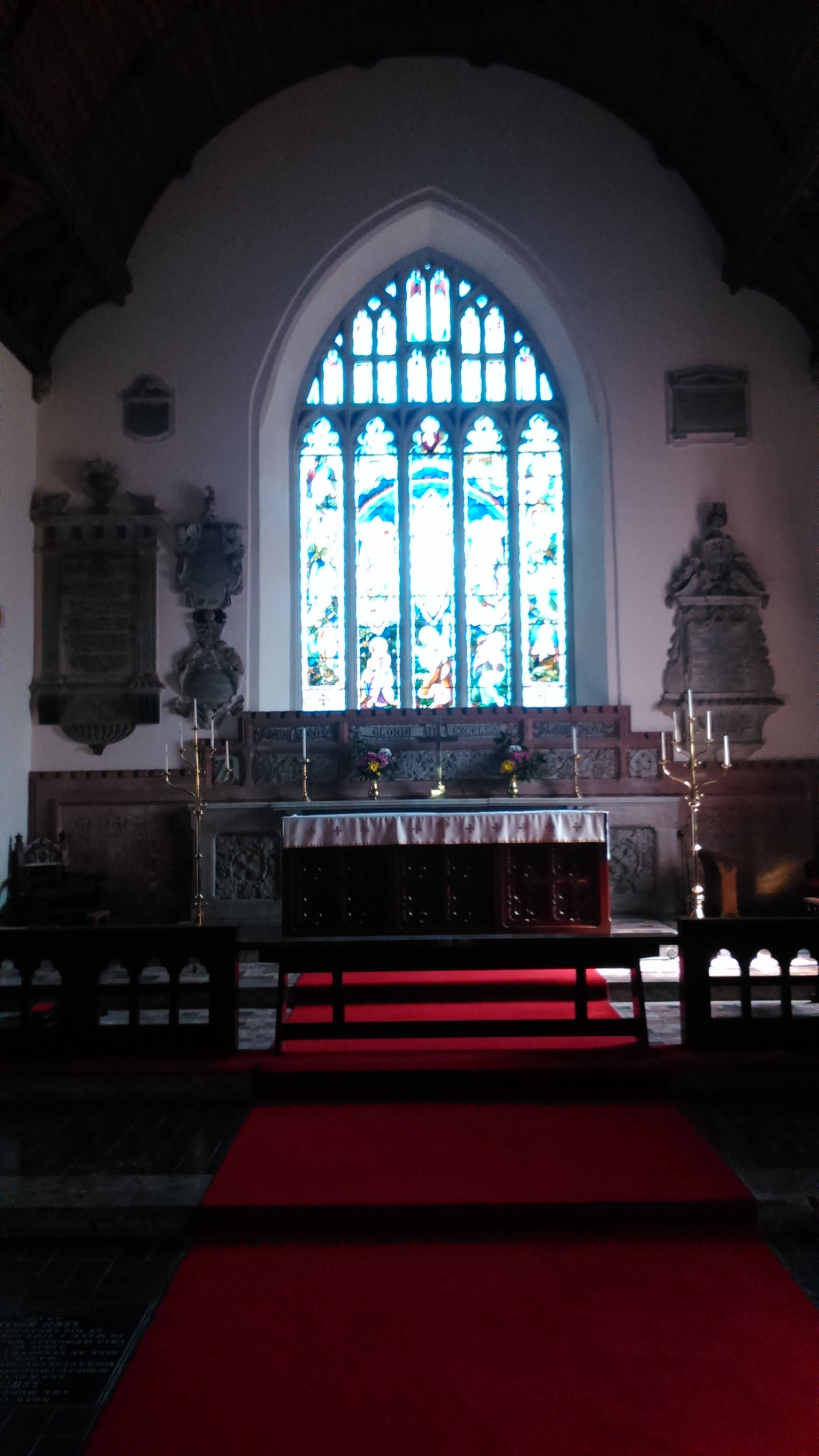
Chancel, looking towards the altar and the great east window, St Padarn's Church, Llanbadarn Fawr

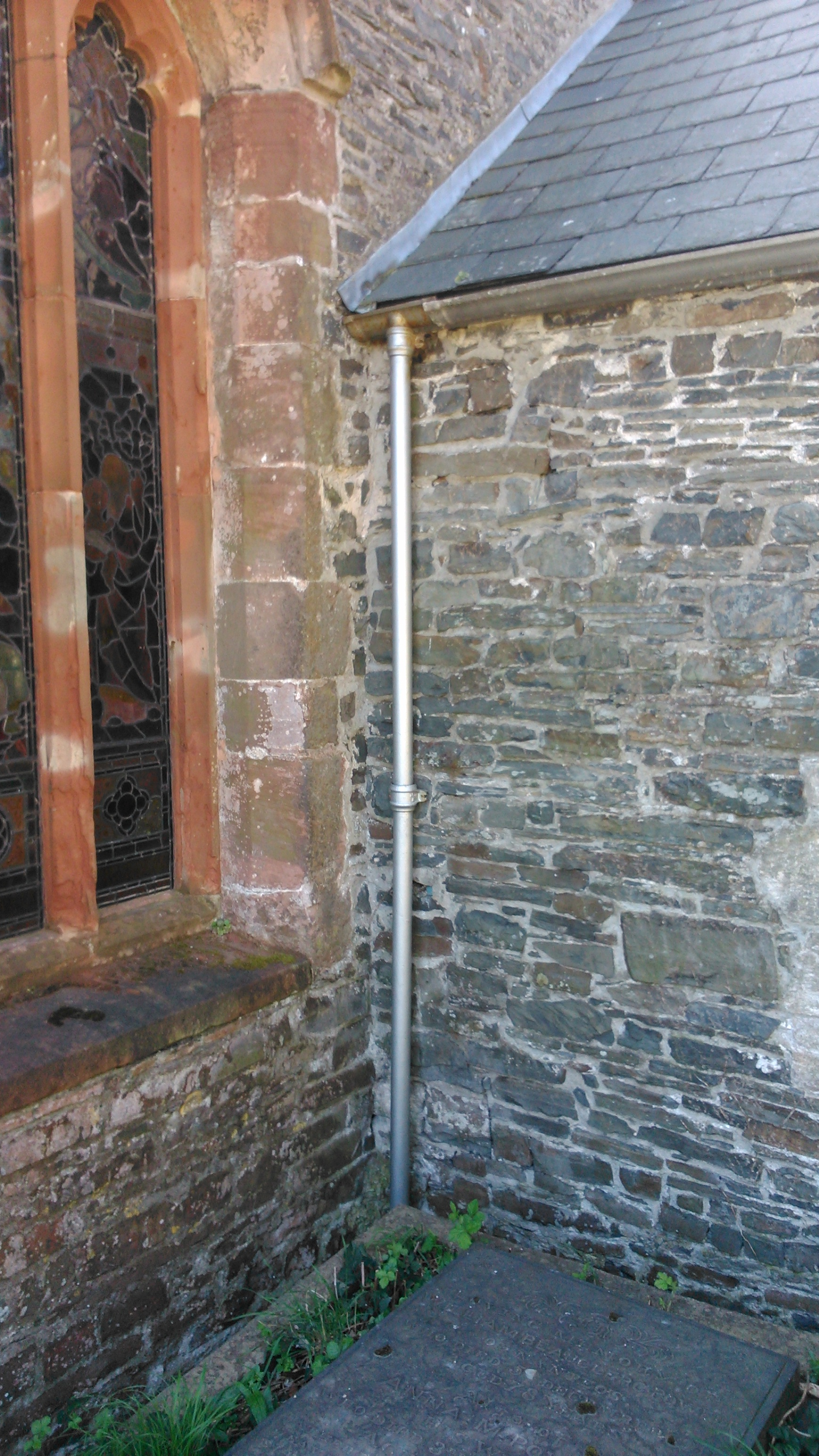
Priests’ vestry, angle of wall adjoining to chancel

There are three small square-panelled doors to the north wall of the chancel. One is at the base of the former rood loft stair, and this may be followed up a mural staircase built into the thickness of the wall, to a second door, which is high on the wall to the left. This would have been the entrance to the rood loft itself. The two doors are of slightly different style; the lower door has a triangular form not seen elsewhere in the church, suggesting early Tudor work. The upper door, which would originally have led to a loft, is a four-centred arch, possibly late Gothic, probably late fifteenth to early sixteenth century. The two could be contemporaneous with the work in the rest of the chancel.

The third door is a vestry door further right, leading to the small gabled north priests' vestry. It is of uncertain age and could be of nineteenth century origin. It now includes a modern brick chimney stack.). The priests' vestry in turn leads to the later nineteenth century choir sacristy or vestry. This is a slight lean-to structure, with timber glazing to the roof in two levels, and is built, none too elegantly, between the east end of the north transept and the original priests' vestry.

Opposite the internal doors, in the south wall, there is a plain pointed priest's door with cut stone voussoirs, by Seddon, with wrought iron hinges.

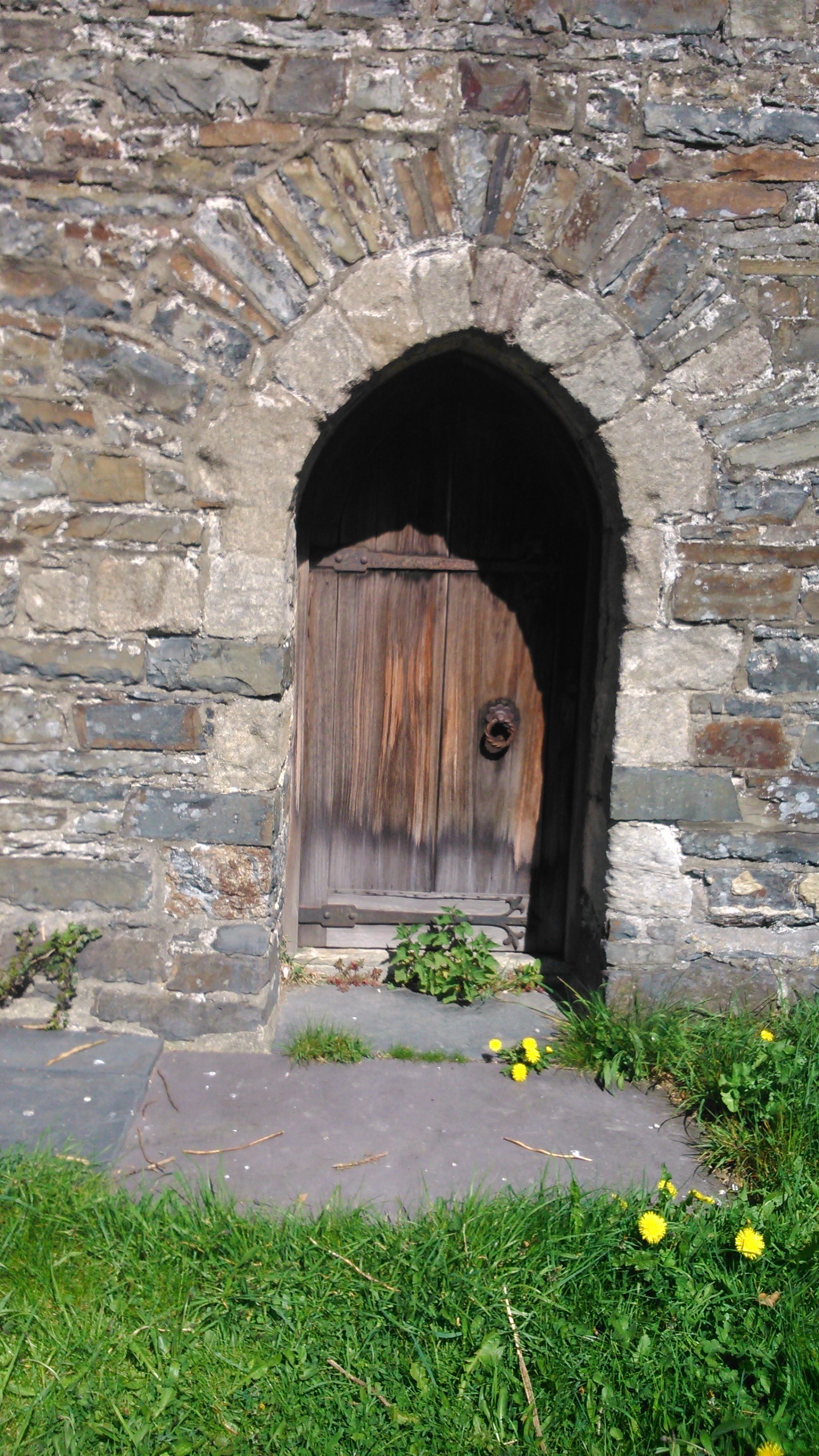
Priests’ door in chancel, south side

The 1880s Seddon high altar has a fine reredos across the east wall in red sandstone and white marble. There is red stone outer wall-panelling in squares of rose and vine, in a moulded frame. A white marble shelf or Retable on brackets over pink marble framing is behind the altar, with outer panels of white marble with a cross on vine background. The frame is stepped over the main reredos. Five white marble inner panels are separated by short half-octagonal red stone columns. There are Alpha and Omega symbols at each end and three long panels, two of vine and a centre passion flower. Above these latter three are three white marble lettered panels, two with "Laus Deo" ("Praise be to God"), and the centre with "Gloria in excelsis Deo" ("Glory to God in the highest"), also red stone framed.

Timber altar rails by Seddon, in open grid within panels, the top openings cusped, protect the sanctuary. The timber altar is also by Seddon, with three panels each of four quatrefoils.

Following a common practice in convents and collegiate churches it is believed that there were usually choir stalls in the west end of the chancel (often called the choir or quire). Several Seddon pews remain here, although the choir today occupies the crossing.

=== The crossing ===
There is a red marble step to the chancel end of the crossing. The crossing has a chamfered north east angle for a tower stair, with a door at the foot. Two small windows light the staircase to the ringing chamber. There is a complex oak roof in nine panels with heavy beams and pendant bosses. The corner panels have fan vaulting on corbels, the other outer panels slope and the centre has a moulded roundel. There is a small plug in the centre, which, when removed, allows observers in the bell ringing chamber to view the crossing. The massive arches, supporting the equally monumental tower, is apparently early thirteenth century.

The stalls and pews in the crossing, by Seddon, are similar to the pews in the nave (being of pitch pine with pegged tenon joints) but are more ornate, with open-arcaded front kneelers and two reading desks with triple pointed arches to the fronts and scrolled tops to the uprights.

At the entrance to the south transept is the organ. This is by Forster and Andrews, of Hull. This organ building company was formed by James Alderson Forster (1818–1886) and Joseph King Andrews (1820–1896). The business developed and became one of the most successful of the North of England organ builder. The business was taken over by John Christie in 1924 and finally wound up in 1956. As well as their Hull headquarters, the company had branches in London and York. The organ dates from 1885. It was a gift from Sir Pryse Pryse of Gogerddan. The organ has a pine case, and painted pipes.

=== The south transept (the chapel of St Padarn and exhibition) ===
The transepts have boarded ceilings with heavier ribs, and three by six panels, each panel subdivided in four, with brattishing and a band of quatrefoils to the wall-plate. Each transept has pointed tomb recesses in the end wall.

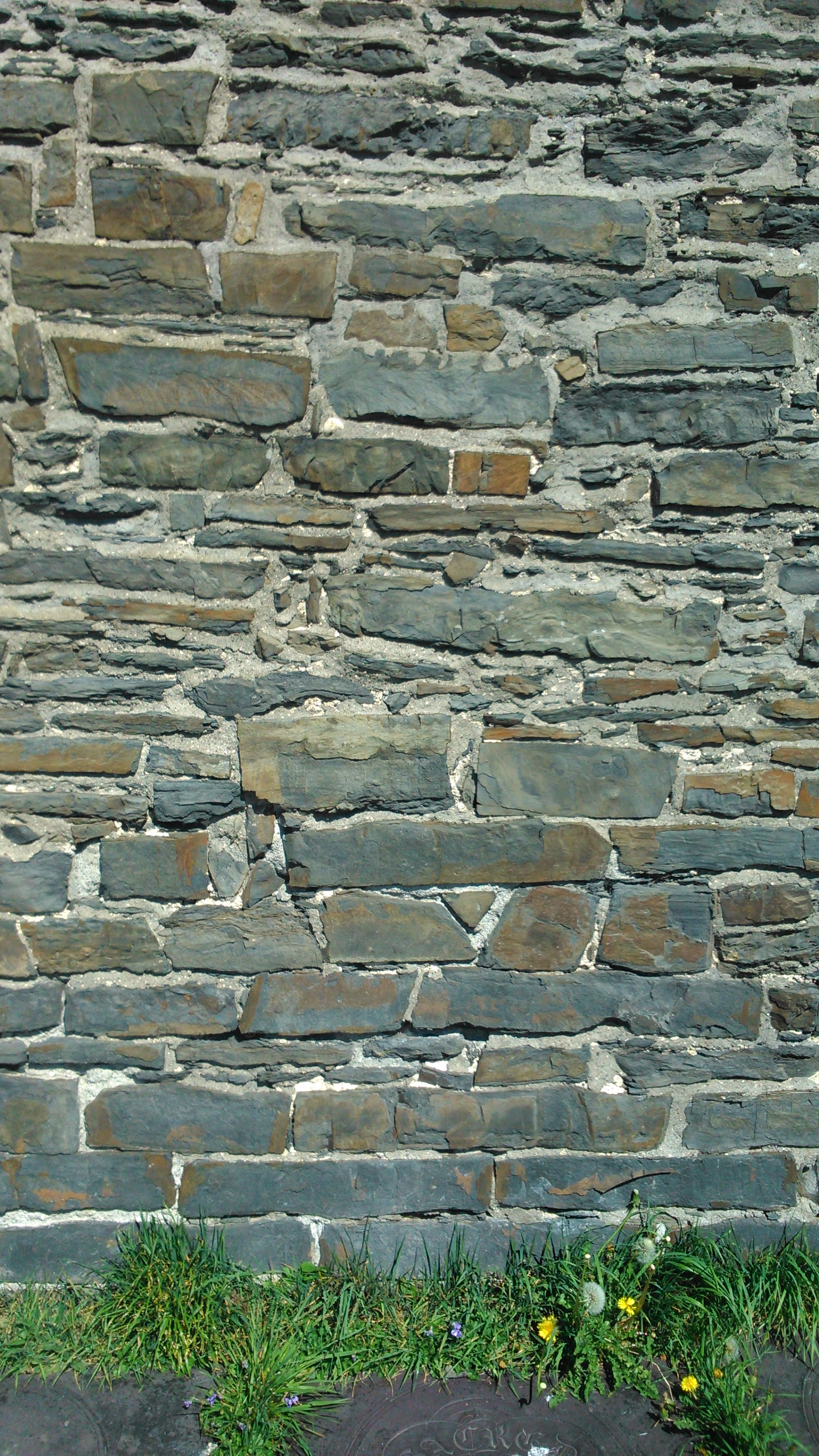
South transept, east wall

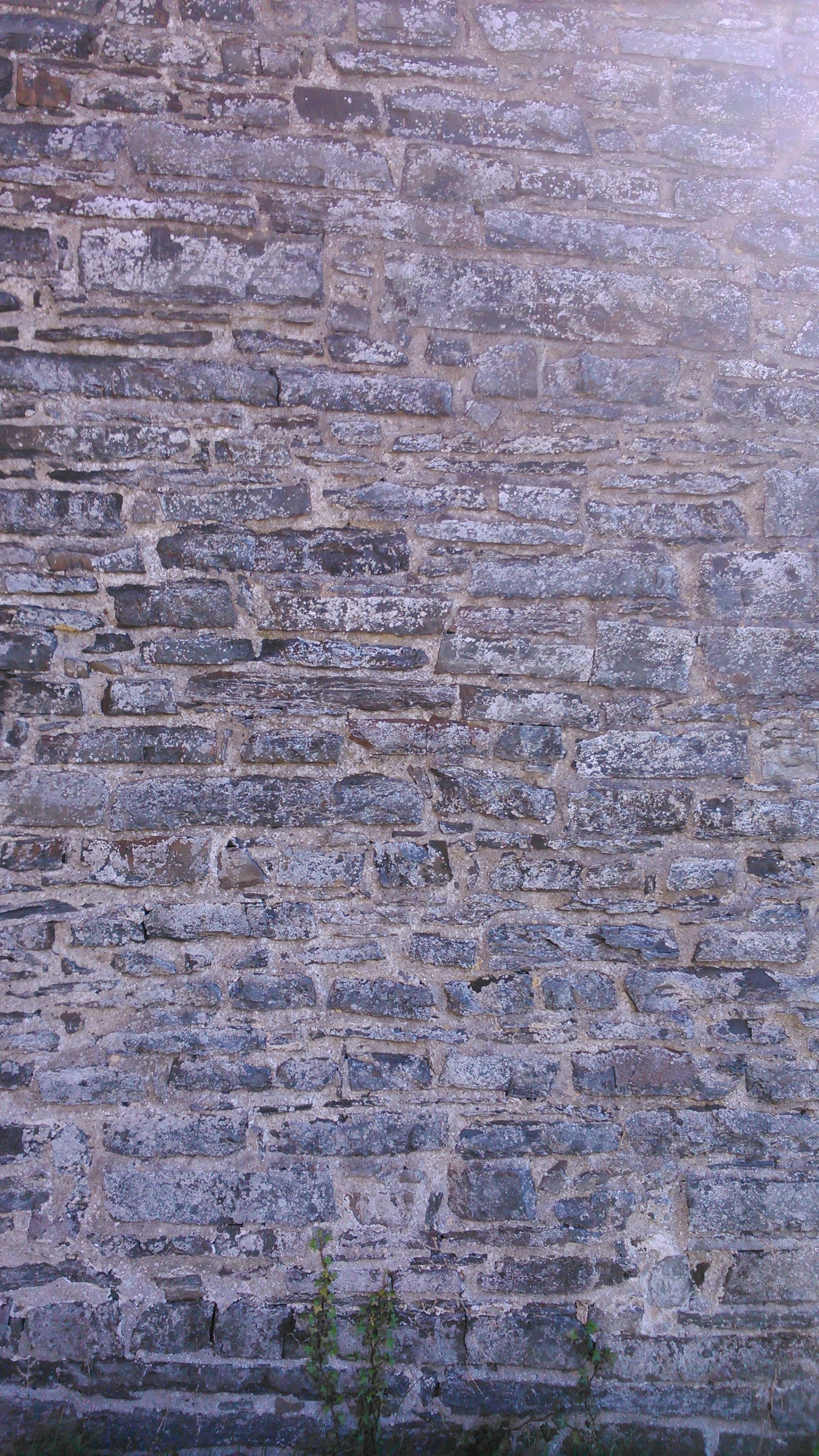
South transept west wall

The south transept (popularly known as Capel y Dre [the Chapel of the Town] or Capel Aberystwyth) is now a museum and chapel of St Padarn. This was built 1985–1988, in the space of the old transept, to designs by Peter Lord, with work by a number of notable craftspeople. It was an initiative of the town rather than of the church. The exhibition depicts the rich history of the area, with displays on St Padarn, and local people like William Morgan. A facsimile copy of Morgan's Bible is displayed there. Another display tells the life story of Sulien. There are three niches or recesses, which may once have held the monumental effigies of some of its priests, but no effigies remain. The two larger niches are in the central chapel; a smaller niche houses the altar stone in the chapel of St Padarn, to the left.

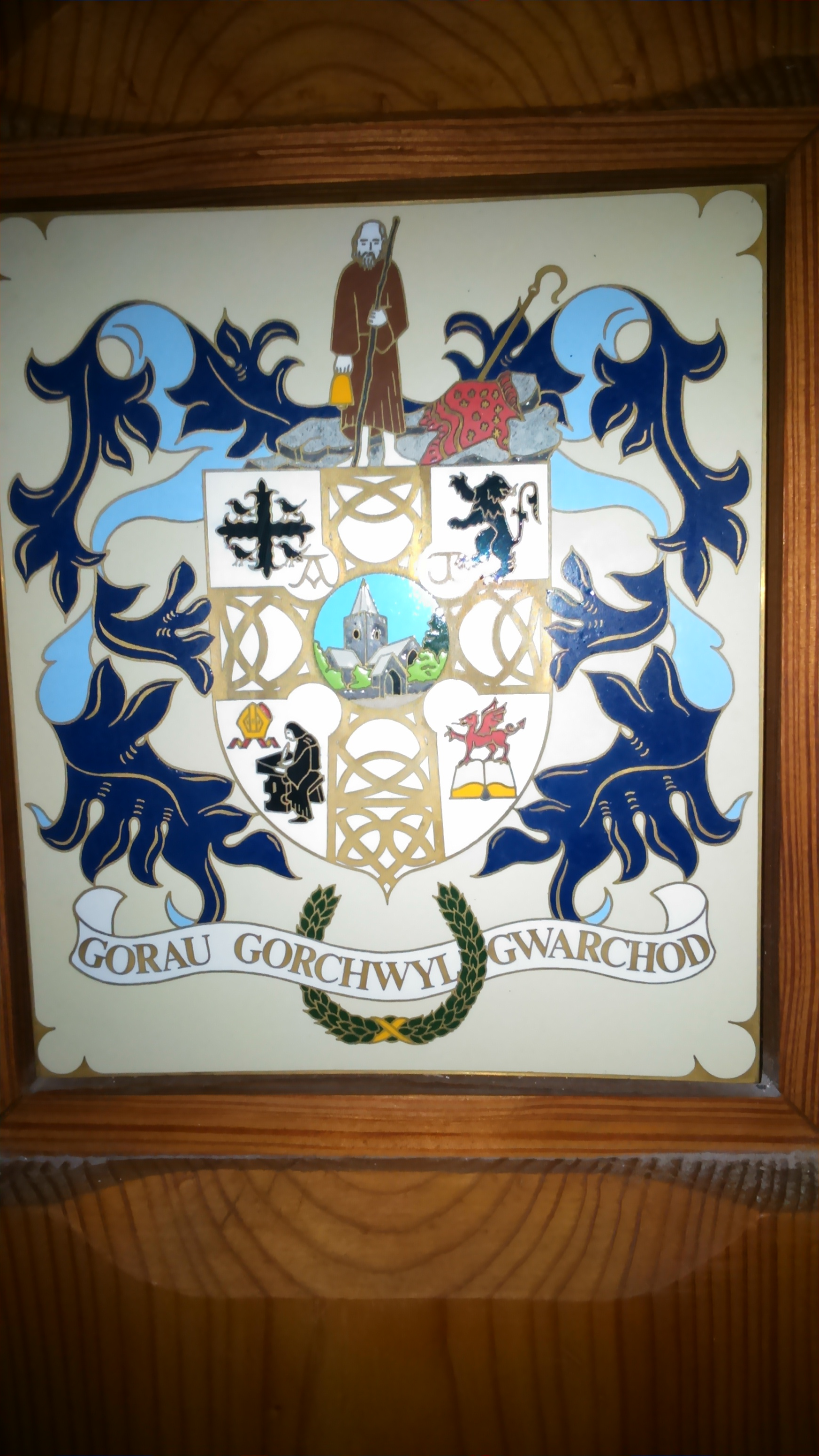
Coat of arms on south transept screen, St Padarn's Church, Llanbadarn Fawr

A pitch pine screen with etched glass panels of winter and spring leads to the new rooms in the transept. The screen contains lines from the poetry of Dafydd ap Gwilym, who is regarded as one of the leading Welsh poets and amongst the great poets of Europe in the Middle Ages. Dafydd ap Gwilym wrote his famous poem "The Girls of Llanbadarn" ("Merched Llanbadarn") about the church in the mid-fourteenth century. There is a ceramic coat of arms set into the screen on the right-hand side, with the motto "Gorau Gorchwyl Gwarchod" ("Best reference for protection").

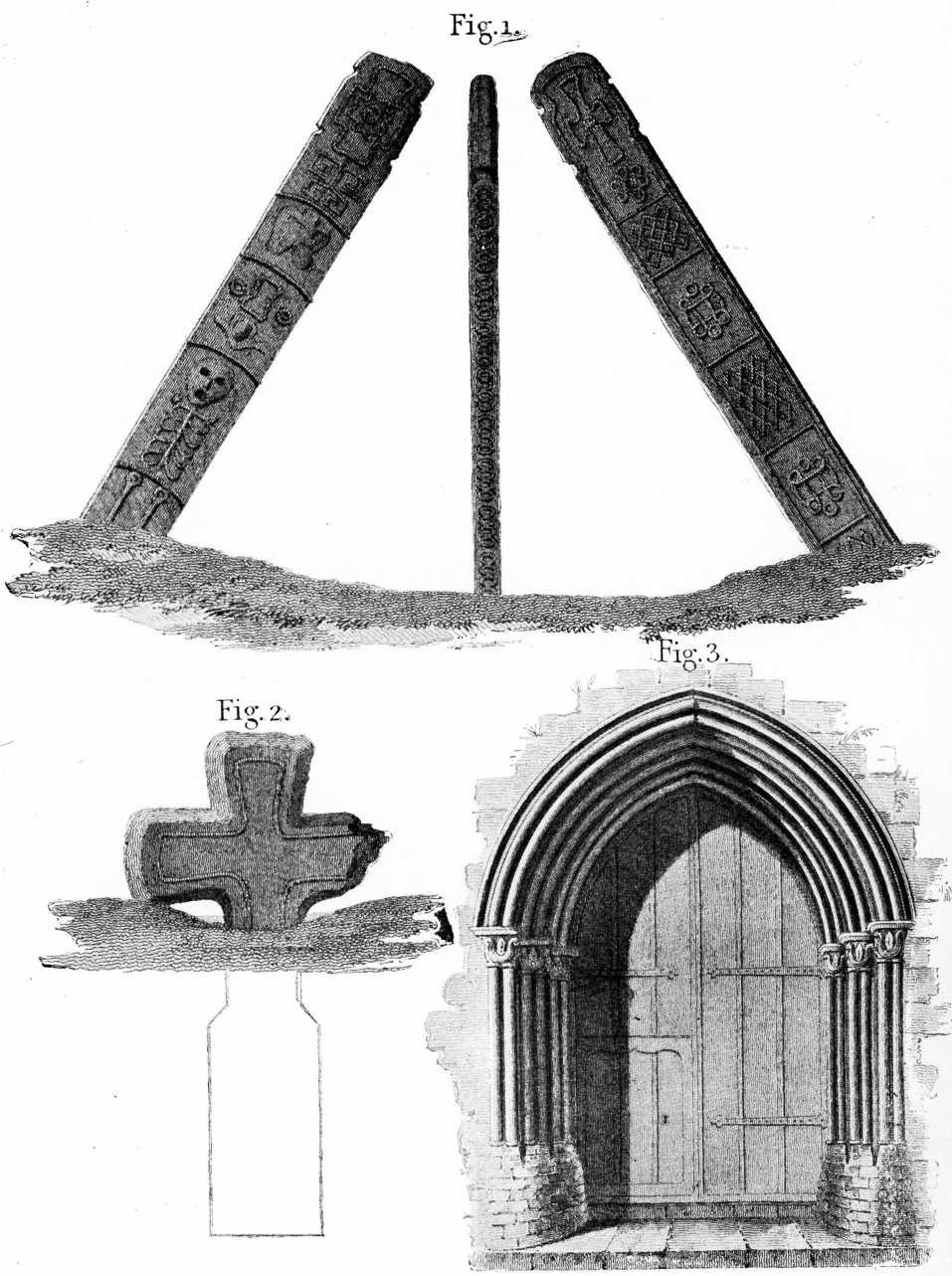
Nineteenth century drawings of the pre-Christian Celtic standing stones at St Padarn's Church, Llanbadarn Fawr

The church contains two ancient carved stone crosses, since 1987 in the south transept. They were formally (before 1916) on display opposite the entrance to the south porch. Earlier still, before 1830, they had been situated in the angle between the south transept and the nave. One in particular shows strong Irish and Viking influence. The first of the crosses is short and squat, with clear arms to each side, in a style reminiscent of pagan "Earth Mother" figurines. It has a crude roll-mould border to a roughly hewn cross. It is much eroded but has one crude human figure with spiral across the body; it may be late tenth century.

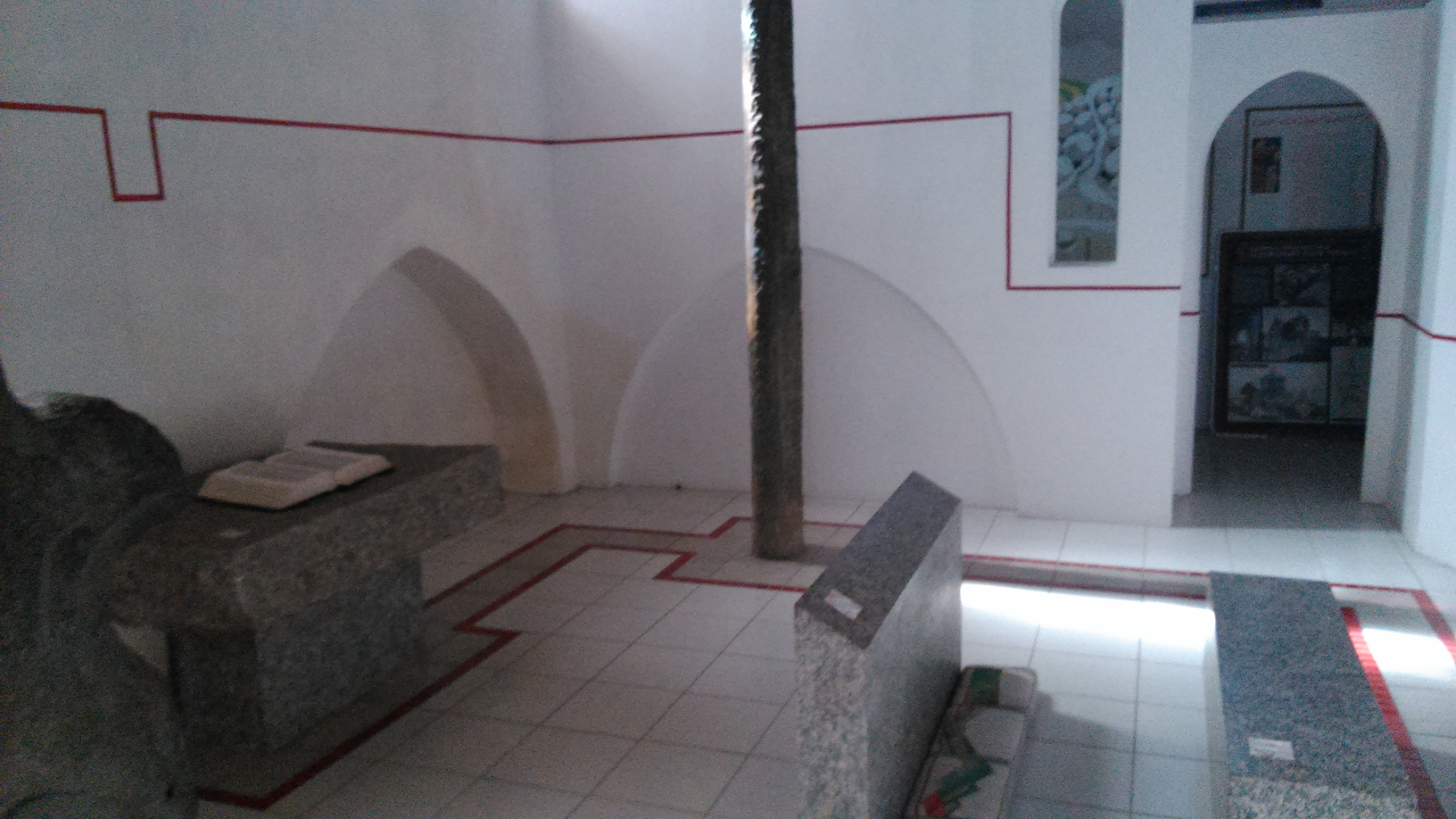
South transept central room, showing position of standing crosses, and entrance to Sulien Room, Llanbadarn Fawr church

The second cross is tall and slender, a free standing monolith pillar-cross, with a slender rounded shaft (changing to square above) and a free armed head formed by notching the shaft. It is carved with figures in traditional Welsh style. One figure in particular, which looks much like the figure of a saint, is inscribed low on the north face. The Cross of St Padarn is granophyre and has Celtic interlace in panels down one face. It is uncertainly dated between the ninth and eleventh century. Though not comparable with the great Irish high crosses, it shows sophisticated carving, and willingness to bring the stone from the Mawdddach estuary, Gwynedd.

In the centre room of the transept there is a low slate slab altar stone, with an etched red Chi-Ro emblem, with Alpha and Omega incised. A Chi-ro is an early form of Christogram, and is formed by the super imposition of the first two letters of the Greek alphabet onto a circle. There is a rough Cornish granite monolith seat and prie-dieu, which with the altar stone are inset with gold-enamelled small tiles by Andrew Rowe. The wall plaster has an incised red line. There is a white glazed tiled floor with red tile border around the two early Celtic crosses. In the south wall above the stone crosses are 1920s/1930s windows representing Saints Padarn, Dewi and (in the centre and above) Teilo. The Padarn window is a single-light window with a standing figure of St Padarn holding a staff and chalice, with a valley and hills behind him. It was given in memory of members of the Bonsall family, and was made by the Heaton, Butler & Bayne, London, around 1930, thus preceding Peter Lord's work on the transept.

The staff borne by St Padarn in the window is probably intended to represent Curwen, which was revered at Llangorwen. It was given to him by the Patriarch of Jerusalem, along with a cloak or tunic, or so the Life of Padarn (Vita Sancti Paternus) tells us. Padarn's crozier (whatever its true origin) became Llanbadarn's most important relic, still apparently extant in the twelfth century when Ieuan ap Sulien (d.1137), in a poem written on the life of his father Sulien, writes "no other relic can be compared with Cyrwen. A wonderful gift – Padarn's staff". (Cyrwen means "white staff"). It was no doubt this same crozier – assuming that the relic was genuine – that Bishop Sulien brought with him to the meeting of William the Conqueror with the two Welsh princes, Rhys ap Tewdwr and Gruffudd ap Cynan at St Davids in 1081, when the English king recognised Lord Rhys as the legitimate ruler of Deheubarth;

There are small enclosed chambers to either side of the centre chapel. The chapel of St Padarn is on the left, with an imitation pointed vault and slate slab floor. In the entrance to the chapel there is a window on the left side depicting scenes from the manuscript Life of Padarn. The single-light window with various figures, scenes and motifs is by Elizabeth Edmundson, and dates from 1988. It includes Teilo, Padarn and Dewi (David) at the top, a healing by St Samson, Maelgwn, Arthur and Caradog, two kings of Ireland on horseback and a figure with the Virgin and Child. The figures are mostly modelled on figures from the Book of St Chad. In the chapel itself, which has a low slate altar stone and seat, is a porcelain relief sculpture by Gillian Still showing a story from the Life, the ordeal by boiling water. The chapel is lit only by two small windows (one with red glass, the other green) into the central chapel. Neither the altar stone in the larger room nor that in the chapel of St Padarn have been consecrated so neither are strictly speaking altars, and neither can be used for a Eucharistic service.

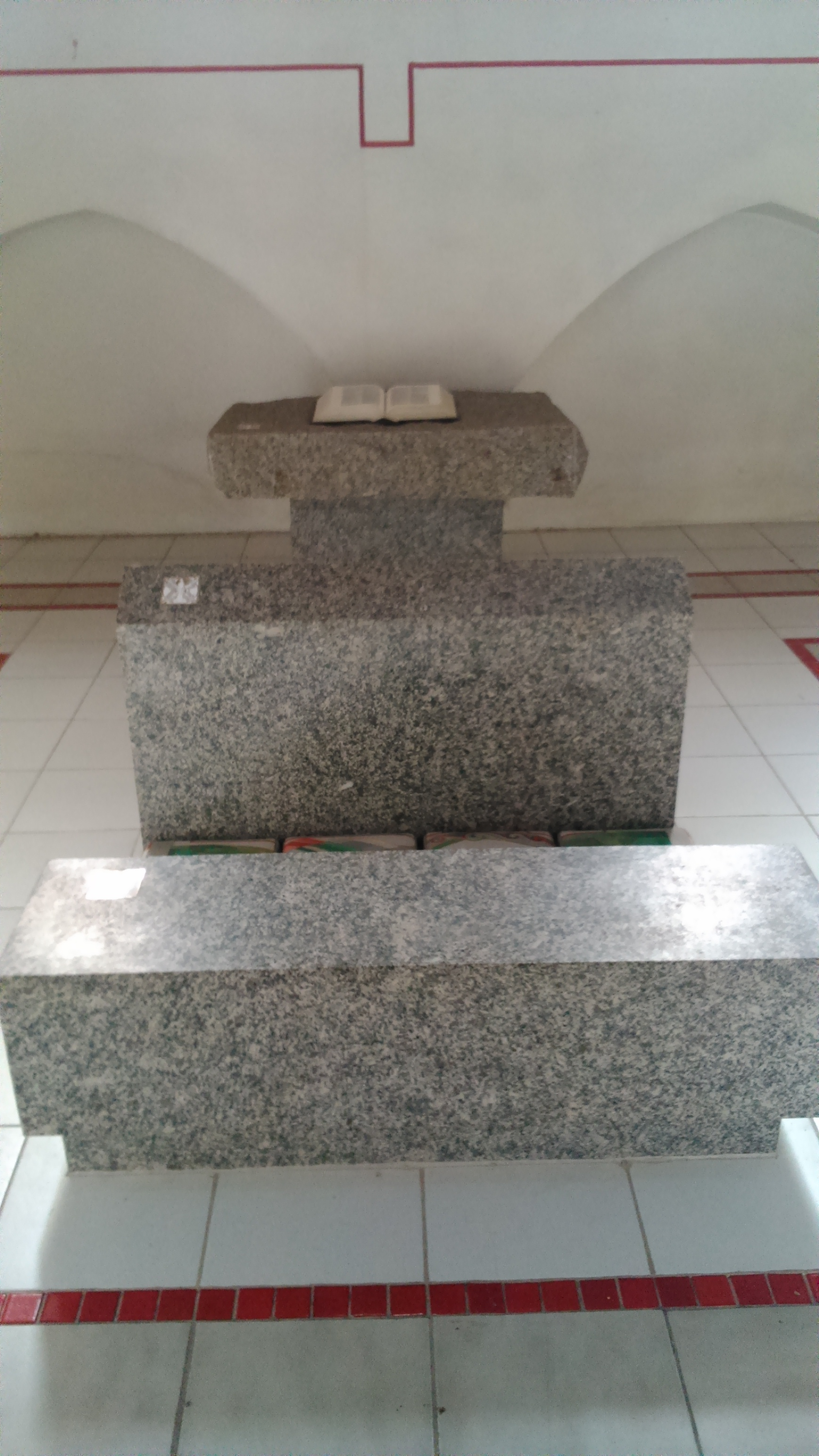
The central room of the museum in the south transept, showing the altar stone, kneeling desk, and niches in the south wall, Llanbadarn Fawr

To the right of the centre room are two small exhibition rooms entered through a screen with two further etched glass windows by Lord, of summer and spring. The first chamber, to the left and the smallest (the counterpart of the chapel of St Padarn), is Sulien's room, which has an incised slate floor slab and lettered text around wall from the Elegy of Rhygyfarch, both by Ieuan Rees.

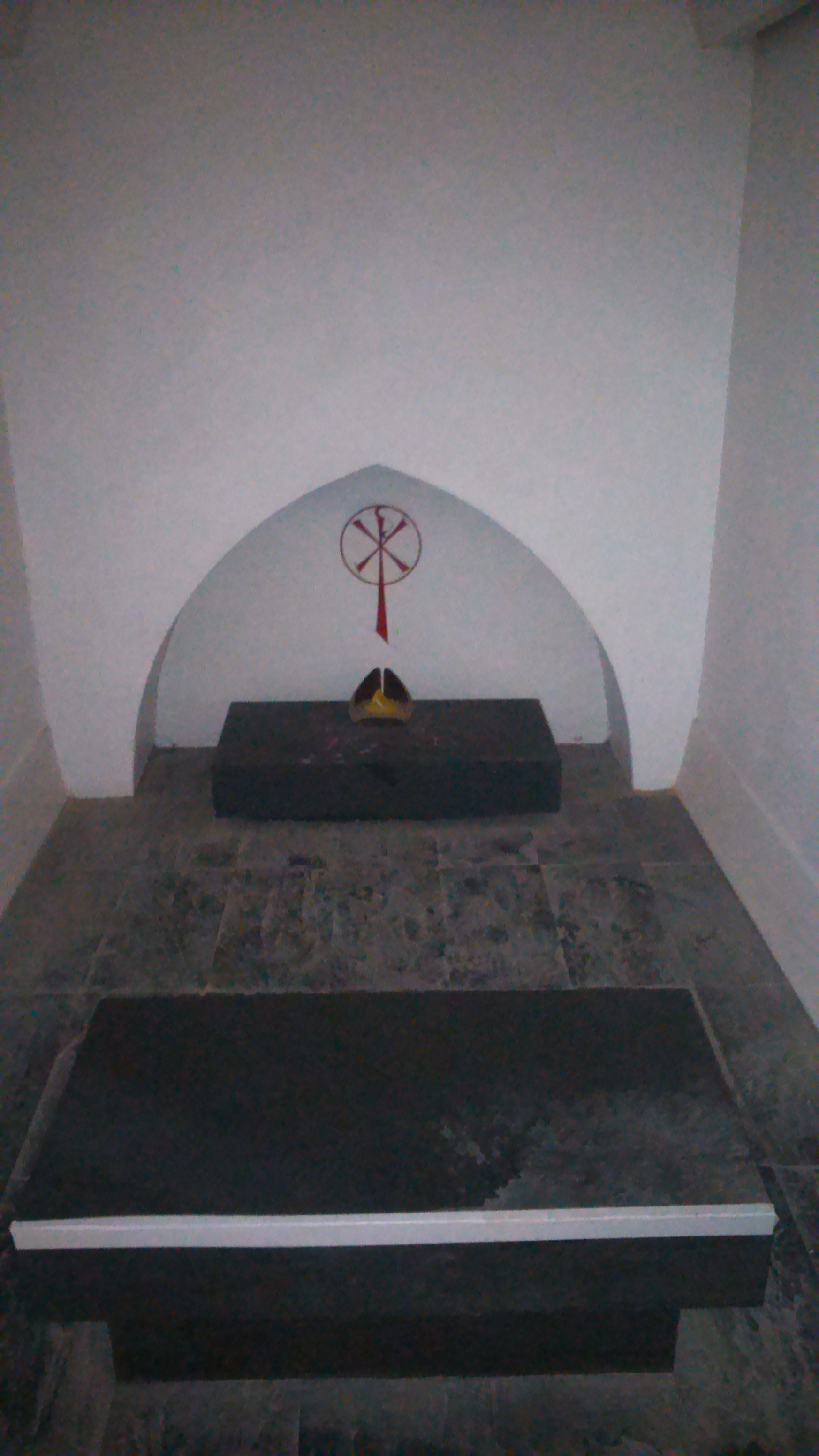
chapel of St Padarn, Llanbadarn Fawr Church

The larger room is entered from an outer chamber. In the outer chamber is located the Burma Star window (1985) with the Kohima Epitaph. The Kohima Epitaph is carved into the 2nd British Division memorial and remembers those who fought in the Battle of Kohima in north east India in the spring of 1944 between the British and Japanese. It also constitutes a memorial to Major-General Lewis Pugh, of Cwmerau, Glandyfi, who fought in the Second World War in the Far East, and who is a kinsman of Brigadier-General Lewis Pugh Evans, VC, who is buried in the churchyard.

The other room, to the right has historical exhibits in display cases by Paul Roberts, and information panels lettered by Mihangel Morgan.

=== The transepts – the north (the Lady Chapel) ===
The north transept (formerly known as Capel Clarach) is now the Lady Chapel. In it are two recesses or niches, similar to those in the south transept. The larger niche, on the right, now houses a picture of St Padarn, dedicated in 2015. There is a small niche to the right, which is now used to store a service book and altar book stand when these are not in use on the altar. The stand is marked "In memoriam 3rd Officer Kathleen Miller, WRNS. Lost at sea on active service, August 19th 1941". The statue of the Virgin and Child, to the left of the altar, was given by Canon Geraint Vaughan-Jones in memory of his parents. He was one of the leading members of the group of twentieth century clergy who was able to reinvigorate the tradition of plygain singing (an abbreviated form of morning service interspersed with and followed by carols sung by soloists and groups) within the Welsh church. Canon Vaughan-Jones (1929–2002) has a memorial in the churchyard in the angle of the south transept and the nave.

The north transept fittings are from 1936 and are by Caroe & Passmore. They include a finely carved reredos with panelling each side, the altar, rails (in the form of a long kneeler), a lectern, pews and kneelers, all in pale oak. The reredos has a carved Crucifixion, with St Mary and St John. There is a small Orthodox icon, a Theotokos, or Virgin and Child, to the right of the reredos. It is a reproduction of an early icon, printed on paper mounted on wood, from Stylite Icons, Welshpool, and probably dates from the 1980s.

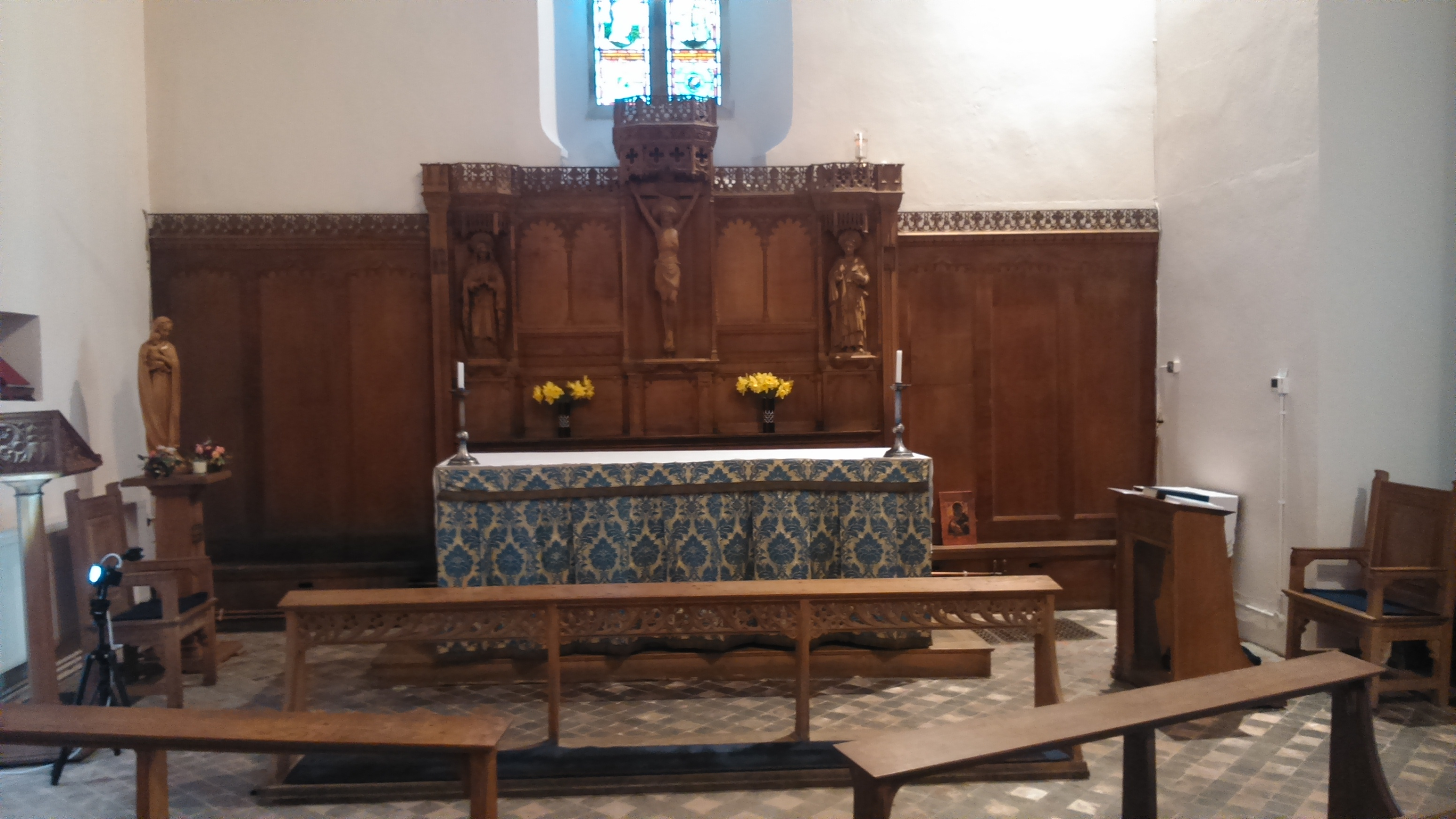
Lady Chapel, showing reredos

The floor of the Lady Chapel is of quarry tiles, with encaustic tiles at the entrance from the crossing. The only monument that survives in the floor is a brass plaque in memory of "J J" with the date 1822, superimposed over a cross patonce.

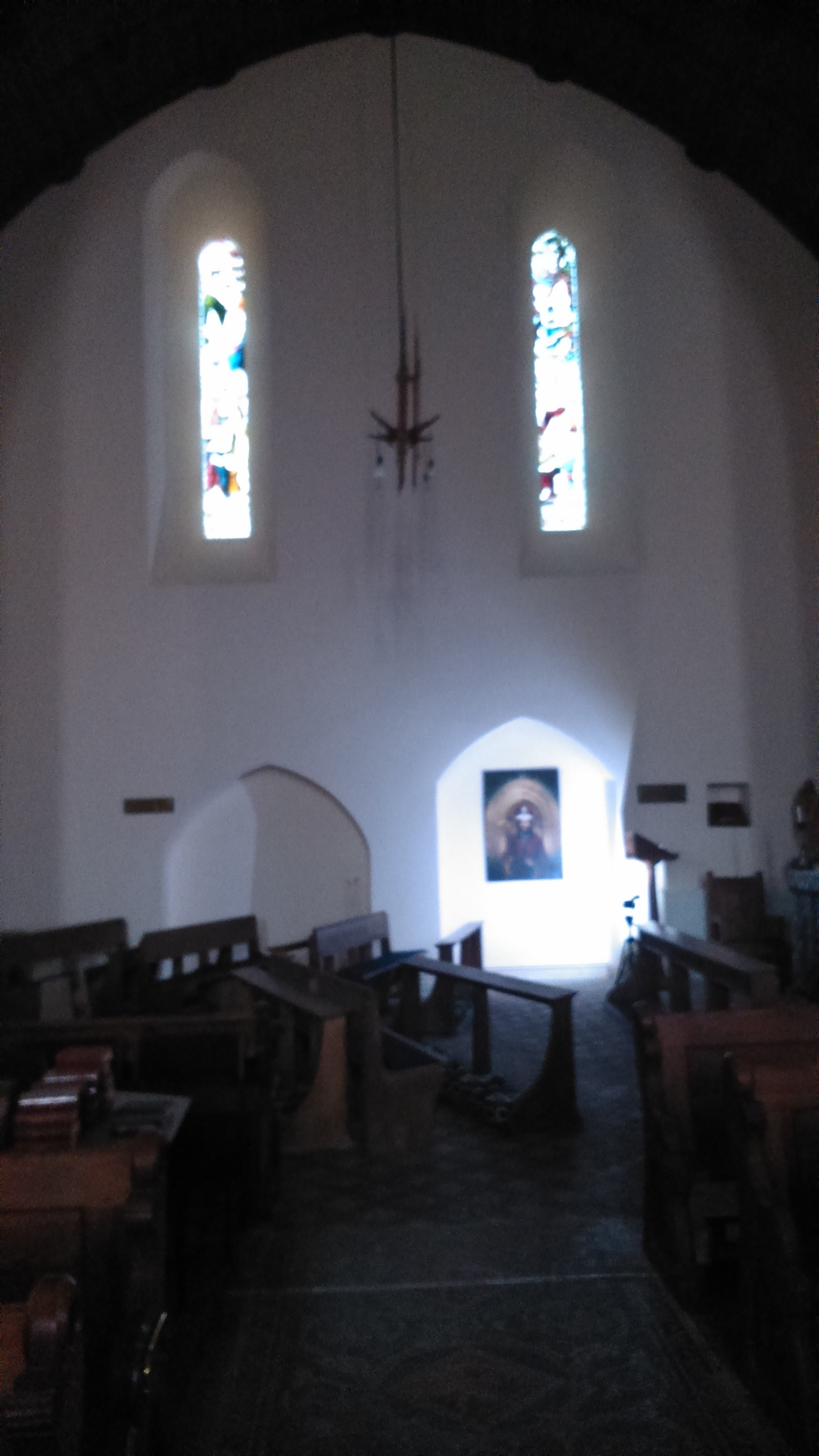
The Lady Chapel from the crossing, Llanbadarn Fawr

=== The nave ===
The nave, which is aisleless, was formerly known as the Capel Hir (Long Chapel). The pews in the nave are by Seddon and are of pitch pine with pegged tenon joints. The stonework is almost all nineteenth century to the nave south wall, less so elsewhere.

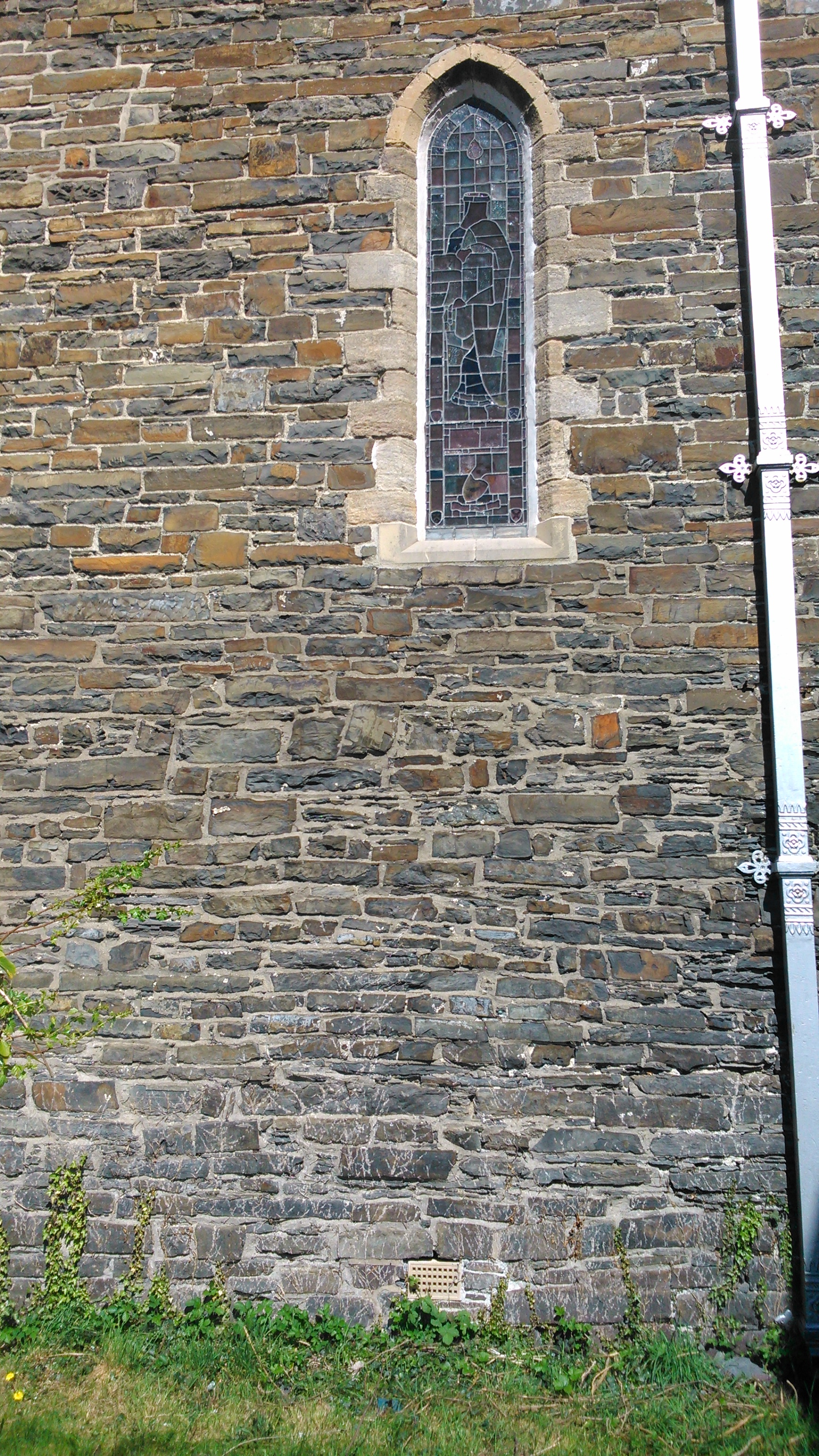
Nave, south wall

The nave roof becomes increasingly elaborate towards the chancel. The nave roof is of eight by twelve panels, boarded with bosses and brattished wall plates.

The ancient font by the west door dates from the twelfth century, and has an arcaded basin. The plain pointed arch forms the only ornament on the font, which has an octagonal ashlar shaft now mounted on a platform, and supporting the octagonal basin. Unfortunately the font has been subject to extensive and clumsy repair. Unusually, it is made of Purbeck marble, which is normally found in churches in south and eastern England; the only other example in Wales is in St Davids Cathedral. Documentary evidence suggests that the massive stem dates from at least the nineteenth century, and stylistic evidence suggests that it is probably a lot earlier; the font basin itself is undoubtedly ancient. Seddon's restoration work in the church commenced in 1869, and included dismantling the font. He carefully cleaned and stored the stonework, and re-erected it on new platform of Radyr conglomerate stone. Radyr Stone is a Triassic breccia used widely for decorative work in the Cardiff area, including Llandaff Cathedral, Cardiff Docks and in the bridges of the Taff Vale Railway. The font previously stood on a three step platform, in the same position as it now stands. The font cover is nineteenth century, in oak and wrought iron.

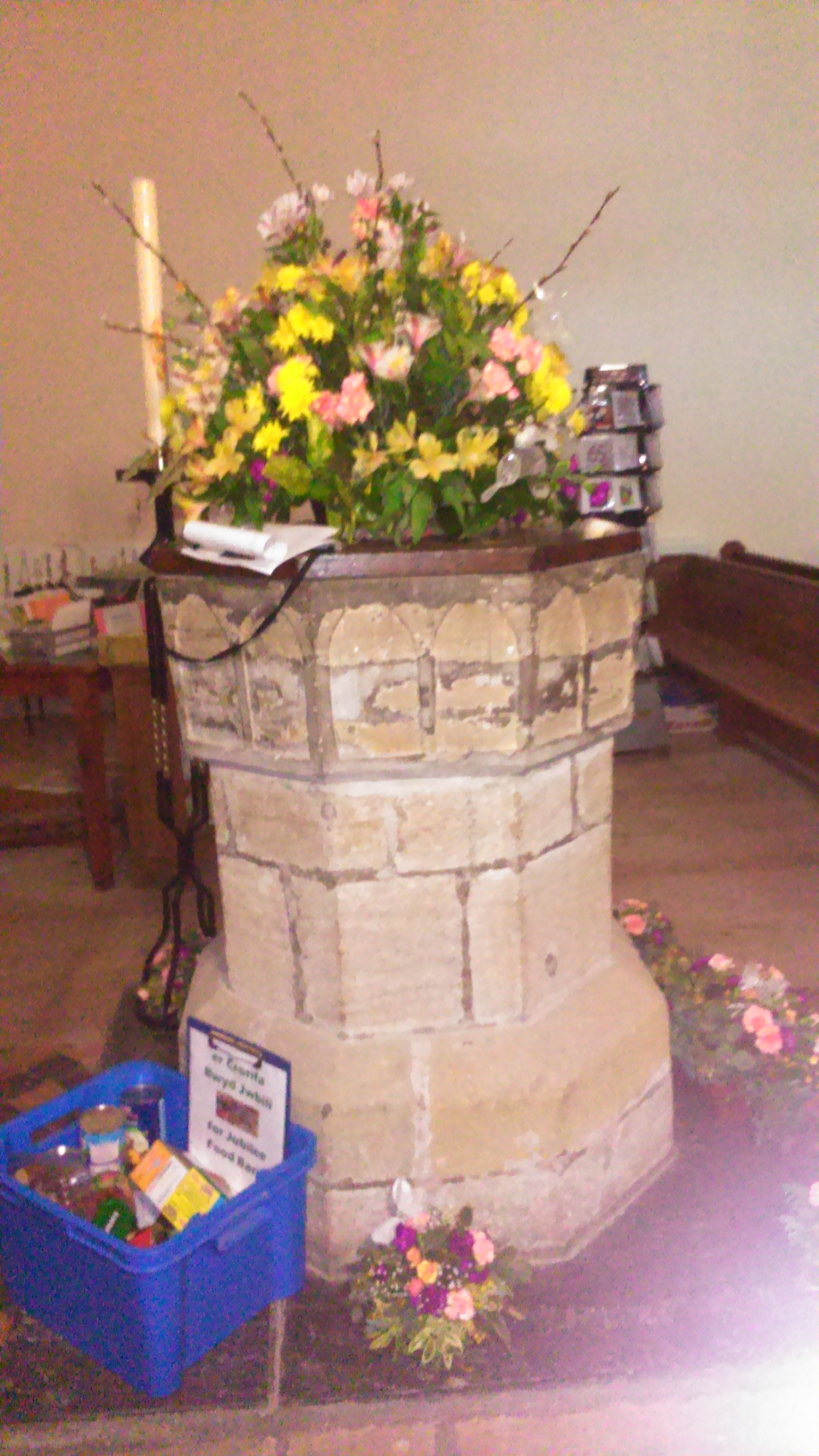
Twelfth century Purbeck marble font

In contrast to the antiquity of the font – probably the oldest piece visible in the church, aside from the Celtic crosses – the pulpit dates from 1879. It was presented by the Bishop of St Davids (the scholarly Basil Jones, bishop 1874–1897), in memory of his mother. It is in Beer stone ashlar Gothic, formed of a drum with two cusped panels with carved stone reliefs of Saints John and Paul by Hugh Stannus, with square rosettes and leaf-carving in spandrels flanking, and a Gothic column with a large capital for a book rest. Opposite this is the usual brass eagle lectern. Both pulpit and lectern are placed in the archway between crossing and nave.

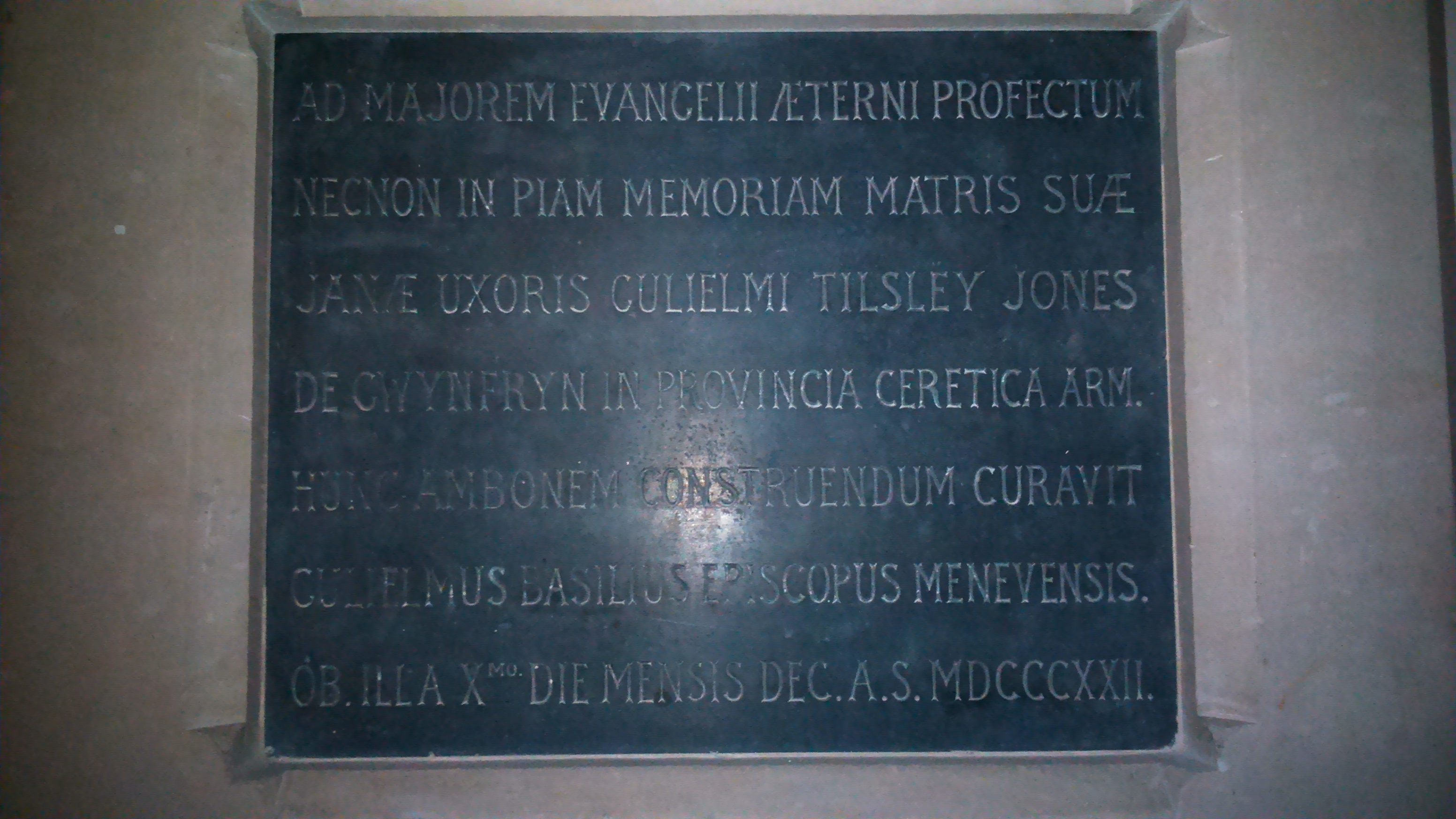
Inscribed brass plaque on east side of pulpit, in memory of Jane Jones, mother of Basil Jones, Bishop of St Davids

The nave and transept light fittings are by George Pace and date from the 1960s.

=== The porch and arch ===
The nave inner porch in oak with long narrow leaded lights was made by George Pace in the 1960s.

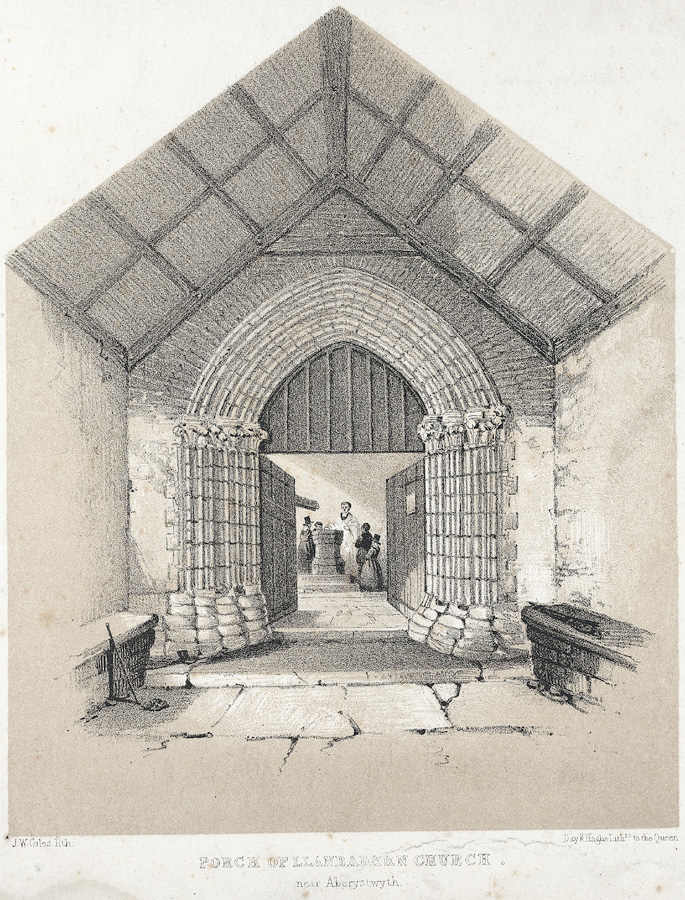
The porch and entrance c.1860. Through doorway it shows the priest administrating holy baptism at the font. Printed by Day & Haghan, lithographers to the Queen.

The west door, actually in the south side of the church, is an elegant ornamented Decorated Gothic pointed arch, traditionally said to have come from Strata Florida Abbey. Whether it actually came from the Abbey is uncertain. A more probable date is thirteenth century, given its syle. Strata Florida Abbey was founded in 1164 and was consecrated in 1201. The arch is exceptionally ornate, indeed the finest such work in the county. It has three deeply moulded shafts each triple-roll with keel to centre roll and stiff-leaf capitals and matching triple mouldings to the pointed arch, with hoodmould. There is no evidence, archaeological or documentary, that it came from Strata Florida, or indeed anywhere else.

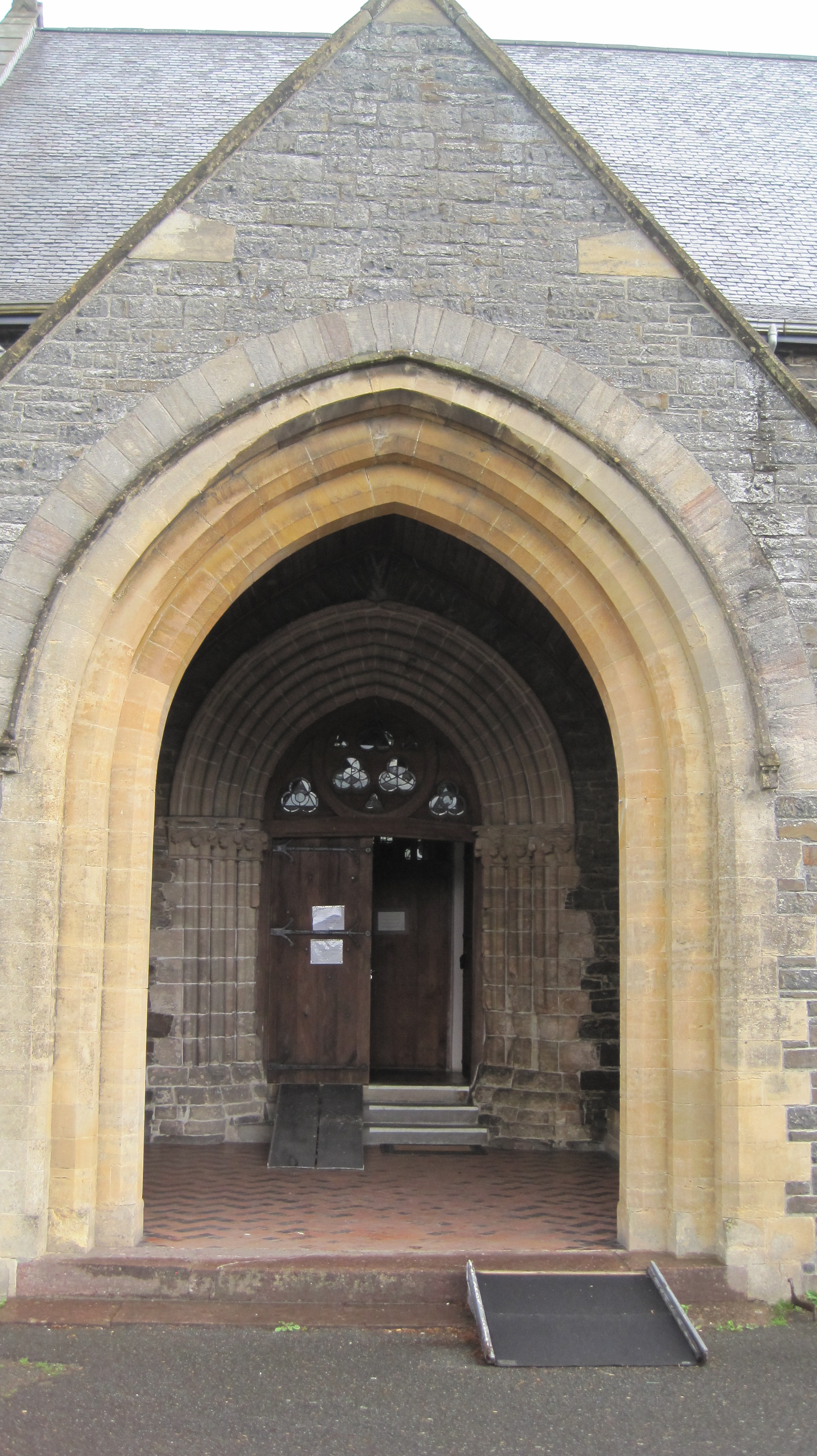
The porch, showing the outer nineteenth century arch and the inner ancient arch

The nineteenth century porch has a big ashlar triple-chamfered pointed arch, hoodmould and stone voussoirs. There is a boarded segmental pointed roof, stone side benches and a quarry tiles floor. There are three steps up to the fine oak double doors by Seddon, with wrought iron hinges and cambered lintel under an oak tympanum with roundel pierced with three leaded trefoils and a trefoil each side.

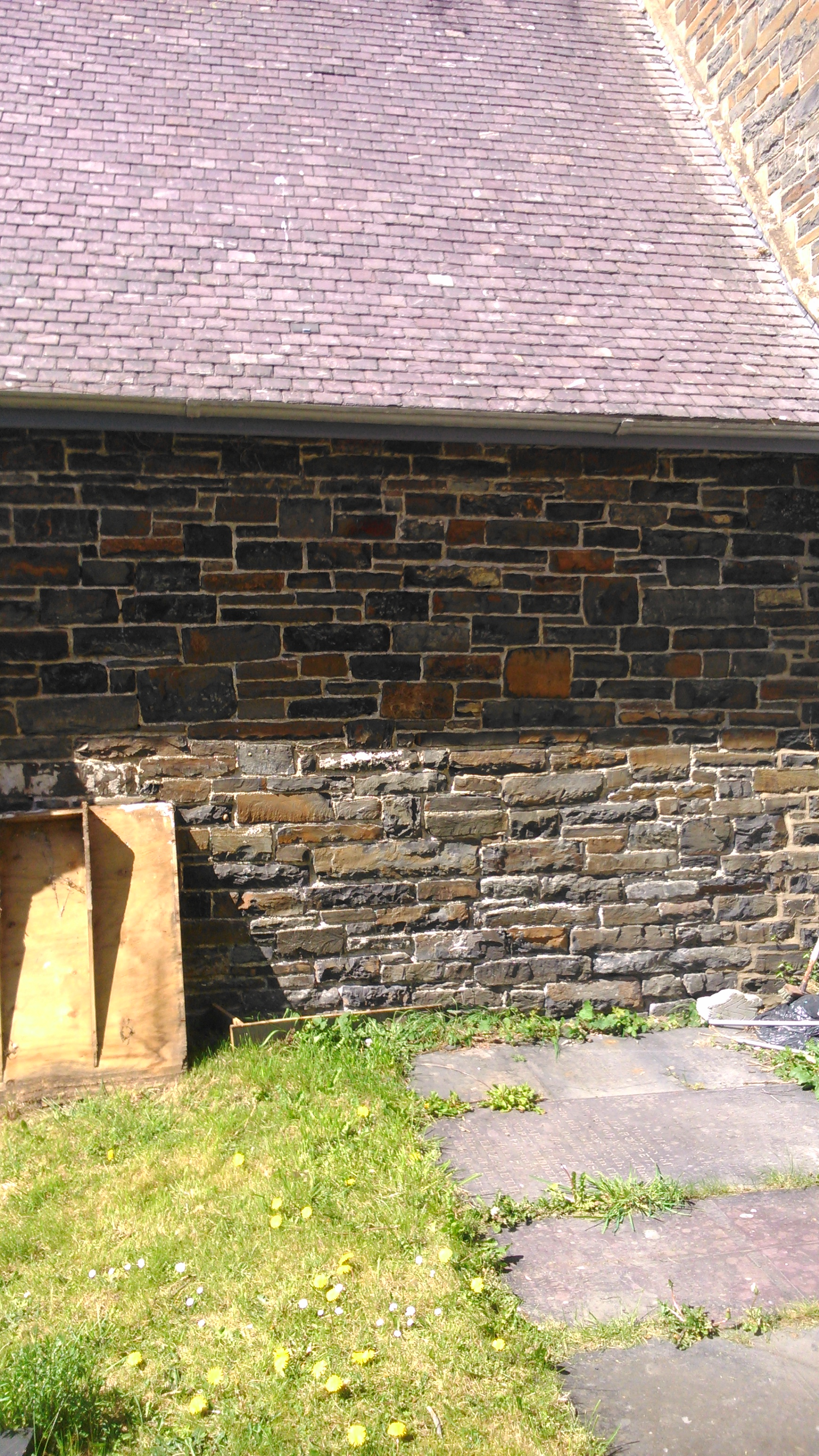
Porch east wall

=== The monuments ===
A large range of seventeenth and eighteenth century monuments survive, mainly in the chancel. They include some for members of the major landowning families in the (original) parish, including the Powells of Nanteos (who were long-time Lords of the Manor of Llanbadarn Fawr) and the Pryses of Gogerddan. A white marble tablet was erected in 1666 to Colonel John Jones, of Nanteos. Several of the monuments are substantial, including that to Lewis Pryse, erected by his widow Margaret, to the left of the north wall window. To the left of the great east window is a monument erected by Mary Pryse in memory of several members of her family. To the right side of the altar – the epistle side of the chancel – is a monument to Thomas Powell. Several smaller monuments are mounted above both of these. In the south wall there is a large memorial to William Powell, and several smaller memorials.

There is a very fine mosaic floor to the centre aisle and cross aisles by Seddon with inset lozenge panels of Minton encaustic tiles of kneeling priests.

=== The windows ===
Every window in the church contains coloured glass (except the two tiny windows in the chapel of St Padarn). The windows are mostly narrow single lancets, and at the ends of the transepts and at the west end are arranged one and two. Some are possibly mediaeval, in the same eroded yellow stone as the quoins. The west and south gables have three windows, spaced two below and one above. The north has two only window. There are four lancets to the nave on the north, with three and the porch to the south. The transepts also have single lancet windows east and west. The north transept has a nineteenth century two-light east window with the relieving arch of an older window well above.

The east window is a memorial to Mrs Rosa Edwyna Powell (died 1860), of Nanteos, and her daughter Harriet Edwyna (died 1857), and was inserted by direction of the Will of her son George (died 1882). It depicts the Transfiguration of our Lord Jesus Christ. It was designed by Seddon and installed in 1884. There are other stained glass windows, including the three western lancets, filled with stained glass by the parishioners in 1894, in memory of the Reverend John Pugh, curate 1856–1861 and vicar 1861–1893.

The last window that had contained plain glass was given stained glass in the late twentieth century. For many years well-known local musician Professor Ian Parrott regularly sat beneath this window during services. Before he died, at the age of 96, he commissioned a stained glass window – as he said, he would like to be able to enjoy it before he died. The window, which was designed by John Petts, is on the theme of "Music in Praise of the Lord".

=== The nineteenth century restoration work ===
There were still fine mediaeval screens in the church in 1810, possibly lost when repairs were done in 1813–16; they were gone by 1862. According to the History and Antiquities of the County of Cardigan (1810) by Sir Samuel Rush Meyrick:

The chancel and north transept are separated from the rest of the church by light and elegant carved screens, which, from the elaborate workmanship they display, were probably erected about the time of Henry the Seventh. They are coloured red, green and yellow, and though once very brilliant, are now so covered with dirt as to be scarce perceptible.

Nothing now survives of these carved screens, which were made of oak.

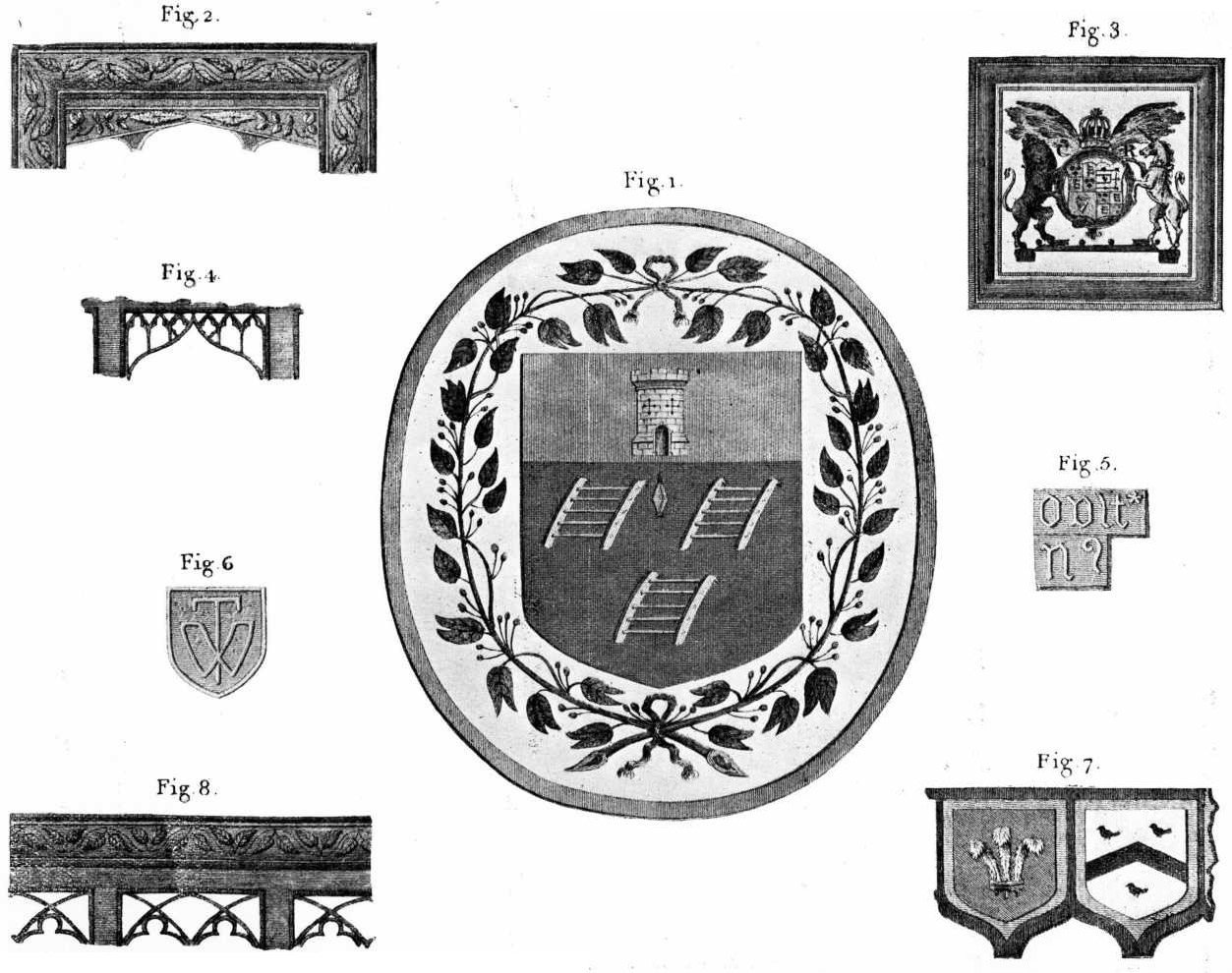
Nineteenth century etchings of the now lost interior woodwork, St Padarn's Church, Llanbadarn Fawr

In poor condition in the mid-nineteenth century, the nave walls were leaning outward and the roofs decayed, so restoration was proposed in 1848 under R. K. Penson, but not actively pursued until the Reverend John Pugh became vicar in 1861, when new plans were made by William Butterfield. Butterfield however resigned in 1867 and the restoration was finally carried out 1867–84 by John Pollard Seddon. The church was substantially restored in stages at a cost of £8,500, and the roof was renewed, apart from the wagon roof over the chancel, which survives above Seddon's roof. The restoration work in general consisted of the reconstruction of the nave, the lifting and paving of the chancel, the construction of a new altar and the reconstruction of the north and south transepts. The nave was opened in 1869 and the tower and south transepts were opened in 1880.

Seddon thought that the church had once been much more elaborate, like the South doorway, and proposed inserting a matching West crossing arch, and also more a complex spire, but this was opposed by Bishop Basil Jones, and was abandoned. Seddon also proposed replacing all the roofs in a steeper pitch, thinking the existing ones were poor sixteenth century work. This was done, except that the fifteenth century chancel roof was retained between the new roof and the ceiling.

The nave was in poorest condition and the walls were substantially rebuilt and the porch wholly replaced in the first phase in 1868–9, with Thomas Williams of Cardiff the contractor. The font was restored at this time. Traces of painted decoration were found in the nave, including a colossal St Christopher on the north wall opposite the entrance. Unfortunately this and other traces of fresco could not be saved; they were destroyed without a pictorial record of them having been made. The committee considered an oak roof for the nave, but rejected it as too costly.

The tower and transepts were restored 1878–80 with a short spire similar to the original, but slated rather than oak-shingled. This work was done by Roderick Williams. The pulpit dates from this time. William Morris, on behalf of the Society for the Protection of Ancient Buildings, wrote to the vicar in 1877 asking for a less severe restoration. Unfortunately much had already been destroyed.

The chancel finally was restored 1880–1884. The chancel glass by Stephen Belham is to Seddon's designs.

Further repairs and fittings were done 1935–1936 by Caroe & Passmore (primarily to the Lady Chapel), and in 1960 by George Pace (the interior porch, and light fittings). The museum and chapel of St Padarn are the most recent works, aside from the re-casting and re-hanging of the peal of bells.

=== The listing of the building ===
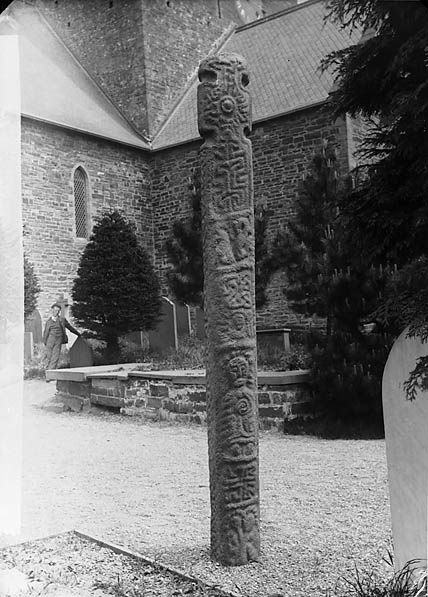
One of the crosses in Llanbadarn Fawr, in the churchyard pre-1916

The church has been listed grade I since 21 January 1964. It was listed grade I as being the pre-eminent mediaeval church of the region, with outstanding monuments and fine later nineteenth century fittings and stained glass.

== Churchyard ==
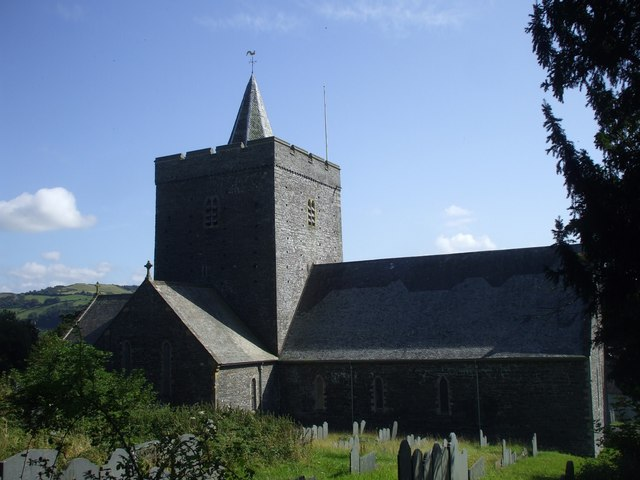
The north aspect of the church from the churchyard

The churchyard covers some two acres. Most of the headstones in the churchyard are modern – many of them are from the nineteenth century – but the churchyard, which is now closed to new interments, contains some old monuments. The whole churchyard and church is surrounded by what was once a typical sign of an early Celtic church; an oval formation of trees. There are also indications which suggest the remains of an early pond, probably for keeping fish for the priests and monks who once lived there. There is no visible trace of any conventual buildings (which would probably have been mostly relatively slight wooden structures, and never extensive). In the early nineteenth century Meyrick does however record the survival of what appeared to be stone monastic or church buildings.

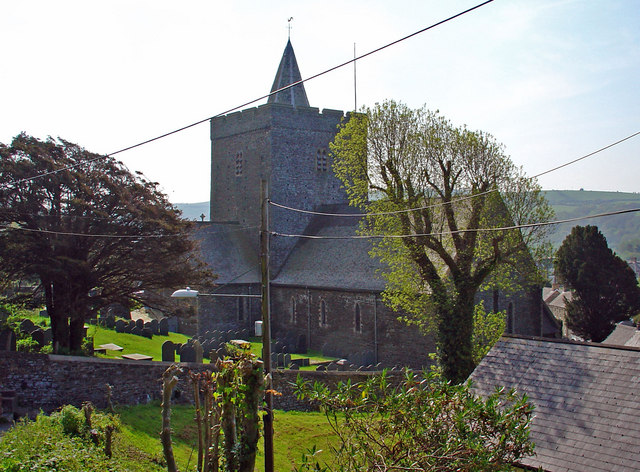
A view from the northwest, showing part of the churchyard

=== Lewis Pugh Evans ===
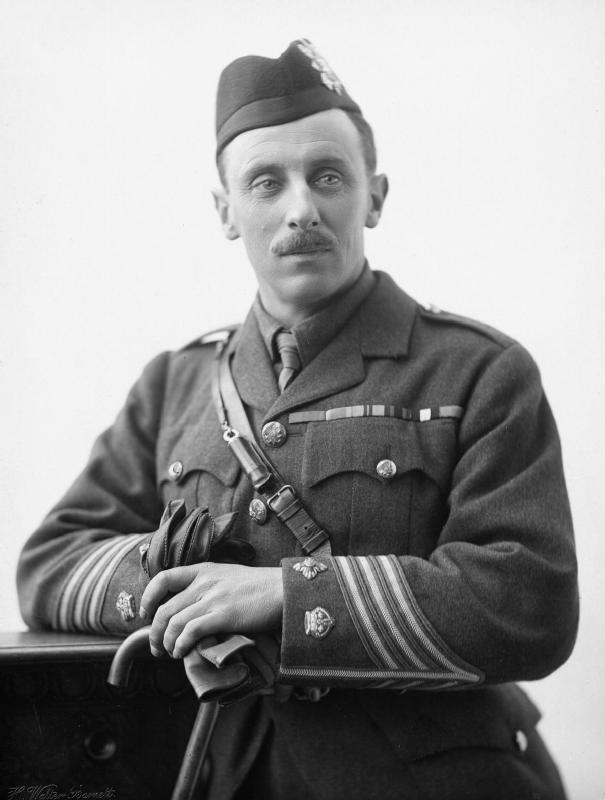
Lewis Pugh Evans, VC

Brigadier-General Lewis Pugh Evans, of Lovesgrove, a World War I Victoria Cross recipient and former churchwarden, is buried in the churchyard. His grave is marked by a simple slate headstone giving names and dates of birth and death. He was a kinsman of Major-General Lewis Pugh, who is commemorated in the south transept. Evans was awarded the VC when, as an acting lieutenant colonel in The Black Watch (Royal Highlanders), on 4 October 1917, near Zonnebeke, Belgium, he was Commanding Officer of the 1st Battalion, The Lincolnshire Regiment:

For most conspicuous bravery and leadership. Lt.-Col. Evans took his battalion in perfect order through a terrific enemy barrage, personally formed up all units, and led them to the assault. While a strong machine gun emplacement was causing casualties, and the troops were working round the flank, Lt.-Col. Evans rushed at it himself and by firing his revolver through the loophole forced the garrison to capitulate. After capturing the first objective he was severely wounded in the shoulder, but refused to be bandaged, and re-formed the troops, pointed out all future objectives, and again led his battalion forward. Again badly wounded, he nevertheless continued to command until the second objective was won, and, after consolidation, collapsed from loss of blood. As there were numerous casualties, he refused assistance, and by his own efforts ultimately reached the Dressing Station. His example of cool bravery stimulated in all ranks the highest valour and determination to win.

He was a Justice of the Peace on the local bench as well as Deputy Lieutenant for Cardiganshire and a Freeman of the borough of Aberystwyth.

Since 1991 a memorial plaque has been on the wall near the village war memorial.

=== Ancillary building ===
A lean-to structure at the end of the north transept houses the heating system. There is a new western end to this building, constructed 2014, and the eastern end (which includes the entrance) can only be entered via the north door to the choir vestry.

=== The churchyard gates ===
The churchyard gate to the south west of the church is listed grade II (26 October 2002). Given the relative size of the churchyard, the church and each of the two gates have their own postcode: the postal address of the church is Primrose Hill, Llanbadarn Fawr, Aberystwyth, Ceredigion SY23 3QZ, the postcode of the west gate is SY23 3QY.

The lychgate to the south east is also listed grade II (25 October 2002), and is located at SY23 3RA. It is a stone gabled lychgate with arched entries and good iron gates. It dates from 1814.

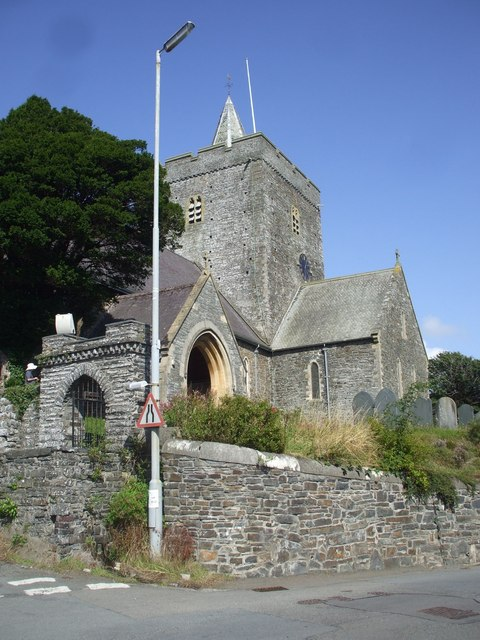
A photograph showing the south west gate

=== The Church Hall ===
There is a modern church hall just outside the grounds of the church, to the west of the church. This was restored in 2000.
