= Wolvesey =

Wolvesey has been the site of the residence of the Bishops of Winchester since the Middle Ages. It could refer to:

- Wolvesey Castle, the medieval palace, now a ruin
- Wolvesey Palace, the current bishop's palace
