= Aethelheard =

Aethelheard may refer to:

- Æthelheard of Wessex, monarch of Wessex
- Æthelheard of the Hwicce, monarch of the Hwicce
- Æthelheard of Winchester, 8th century bishop of Winchester
- Æthelhard, Bishop of Winchester and Archbishop of Canterbury, 8th/9th century
- Æthelgeard, landowner of Winchester and official during the reign of Eadwig in the 950s
