= Aymer de Lusignan =

Aymer de Lusignan may refer to:

- Aymer de Valence (c. 1222–1260), bishop of Winchester.
- Aymer de Valence, 2nd Earl of Pembroke (c. 1275–1324), Anglo-French nobleman, nephew of the above.
