= William de Taunton =

13th-century Bishop of Winchester

- Bishop of Winchester-elect
- Elected: 1261
- Quashed: before 22 June 1262
- Predecessor: Andrew of London
- Successor: John Gervais
- Previous post: Abbot of Milton

Personal details
- Denomination: Catholic

William de Taunton was a medieval Bishop of Winchester elect.

== Life ==
Taunton was a monk of Winchester Cathedral before becoming Prior of Winchester in 1250. He was expelled from the office of prior in 1255 by Aymer de Valence, Bishop of Winchester and replaced by Andrew of London. However, he was named abbot of Milton Abbey before 6 December 1256. In 1261, he received a majority of the votes of the chapter of Winchester in an election to become Bishop of Winchester, but a minority selected Andrew of London and both men appealed to Pope Alexander IV and Pope Urban IV. Urban quashed the elections of both men sometime before 22 June 1262. William, however, received a dispensation for illegitimacy from the pope on 6 July 1262.

== Citations ==
Catholic Church titles
Preceded by Andrew of London	Bishop of Winchester; 1261–1262	Succeeded by John Gervais
