= Cyneheard =

Cyneheard is an Anglo-Saxon male given name. Notable people with the name include:

- Cyneheard the Ætheling (died 786), killer of Cynewulf, King of Wessex
- Cyneheard of Winchester (died between 759 and 778), Bishop of Winchester
