= William of Cassingham =

English country squire, archer, and war hero (d. 1257)

William of Cassingham (or Willikin of the Weald) (died 1257) was a country squire of Cassingham (now Kensham) in Kent at the time of the First Barons' War. During that conflict, he raised a guerrilla force of archers which opposed the otherwise total occupation of the south-east by Prince Louis of France. A contemporary chronicler, Roger of Wendover, wrote of him:

A certain youth, William by name, a fighter and a loyalist [to King John] who despised those who were not, gathered a vast number of archers in the forests and waste places [of the Kent and Sussex Weald], all of them men of the region, and all the time they attacked and disrupted the enemy, and as a result of their intense resistance many thousands of Frenchmen were slain. Roger of Wendover, Flores Historiarum, II. 182 (Rolls Series, London, 1887).

On the death of John and accession of Henry III in October 1216, much of Louis' English support fell away and he decided to march from London to the south coast to sail to France for reinforcements. On the way, William's force ambushed Louis near Lewes, routing them and pursuing them to Winchelsea, where they only escaped starvation thanks to the arrival of a French fleet. When Louis sailed back to England to renew a siege of Dover Castle in May 1217, he found William and Oliver fitz Regis attacking and burning the French camp there, and so decided to land instead at Sandwich and march to the castle from there.

At the end of the war, William was granted a pension from the crown and made warden of the Weald and (on 28 May 1241) Sergeant of the Peace (predecessor title to that of Provost Marshal, now head of the Royal Military Police) in reward for his services. Until his death, he filled this post, collected his pension and fulfilled minor duties such as fetching logs for the royal household. Holinshed's Chronicles writes of him "O Worthy man of English blood!".

== Sources ==
- Kent Archaeological Society newsletter, issue 75 (winter 2007–08), page 11.
- G. R. Stephens, 'A Note on William of Cassingham', Speculum, Vol. 16, No. 2 (Apr., 1941), pp. 216–223.
- Hundred Rolls of Edward I.
- Matthew Paris, Chronica Maiora II (Rolls Series, London, 1874)
