= Ælfwine of Winchester =

11th-century Bishop of Winchester

Ælfwine
- Bishop of Winchester
- Appointed: 1032
- Term ended: 29 August 1047
- Predecessor: Ælfsige II
- Successor: Stigand

Orders
- Consecration: 1032

Personal details
- Died: 29 August 1047
- Denomination: Christian

Ælfwine (died 1047) was Bishop of Winchester from 1032 until his death. He was one of King Cnut's priests prior to his appointment as bishop, and became a powerful and influential figure at Cnut's court.

== Biography ==
From 1033 he was a frequent charter witness, usually third after the two archbishops, and Goscelin stated that he helped to persuade Cnut to allow the relics of St. Mildryth to be translated to St Augustine's Abbey, Canterbury. He was also a supporter of the nuns of Winchester, especially Ælfgiva, the daughter of Earl Æthelwold who was called the 'abbess of Cologne'.

Ælfwine must have maintained his position in the early 1040s as one of King Harthacnut's charters grants him a hide of land. According to an account in the twelfth-century Quadripartitus which the historian John Maddicott found convincing, he was responsible together with Earl Godwin of Wessex, for inviting the future king Edward the Confessor to return to England in 1041, and in 1042 he witnessed a charter of Harthacnut's together with Edward, Godwin, and Edward and Harthacnut's mother, Emma. As a secular bishop in a monastic cathedral he was unpopular, and this was probably a factor in a famous legend that he was Emma's lover. She was said to have disproved the charge by walking barefoot unharmed over burning ploughshares in the nave of Winchester Cathedral.

After Edward's accession as king in 1042 Ælfwine's career reached a new peak. Edward was crowned in Ælfwine's own church of Winchester, and he witnessed Edward's first surviving charter in third position, after Emma and the Archbishop of Canterbury. From then until his death he witnessed twenty charters out of twenty-two, more than any other prelate. In 1044 Edward granted him the valuable manor of Witney, rated at thirty hides, a grant "to his familiar bishop", "a reward for his faithful service which he has faithfully shown obedience to me." No other churchman approached Ælfwine's standing in the early years of Edward's reign. He died on 29 August 1047.

Two of the mortuary chests in Winchester Cathedral have an identical list of names, Rufus, Cnut, Emma, Ælfwyn, Wini. According to the historian John Crook, Ælfwyn is Bishop Ælfwine.

== Citations ==
Christian titles
Preceded by Ælfsige II	Bishop of Winchester; 1032–1047	Succeeded by Stigand
