= Denewulf =

9th and 10th-century Bishop of Winchester

- Bishop of Winchester
- Appointed: between 878 and 879
- Term ended: 908
- Predecessor: Tunbeorht
- Successor: Frithestan

Orders
- Consecration: between 878 and 879

Personal details
- Died: 908
- Denomination: Christian

Denewulf (died 908) was a medieval Bishop of Winchester from 878 or 879 until his death. Little is known of him, though by tradition he began life as a swineherd, and was promoted to bishop at an advanced age after a chance encounter with Alfred the Great.

== Life and tradition ==
Denewulf was consecrated as Bishop of Winchester between 878 and 879. He died in 908. Chroniclers beginning with John of Worcester in the 12th century recorded a tradition that Denewulf was originally an illiterate swineherd who had a chance encounter with King Alfred the Great. According to these versions, Alfred was taking refuge from the Danes in the forest where Denewulf was feeding his pigs. He was so impressed with the elderly swineherd's character that he sponsored his education and had elevated him to bishop.

Denuwulf's name subsequently became attached to an older story regarding Alfred's encounter with a swineherd. According to this story, first recorded in the tenth-century Life of Neot, Alfred stayed with a swineherd and his wife for several days while fleeing the Danes. One day, the wife berated him for not turning her cakes on the stove when they began to burn; the humbled king subsequently helped her with the baking. This swineherd was identified as Denewulf in John Hardyng's verse chronicle, first published in 1543; in this version Alfred made Denewulf bishop following his wife's death. The story of Alfred and the cakes was often repeated as an example of the suffering the king endured for his realm; modern retellings usually play up the humorous aspect.

== Citations ==
Christian titles
Preceded by Tunbeorht	Bishop of Winchester c. 879–908	Succeeded by Frithestan
