= Council of Hertford =

The Council of Hertford was the first general council of the Anglo-Saxon Church. It was convened in Anglo-Saxon Herutford, most likely modern Hertford (but Hartford, Cambridgeshire has been proposed), in 672 by Theodore of Tarsus, Archbishop of Canterbury. The Venerable Bede is the historical source for this council, as he included its text in his Ecclesiastical History of the English People.

The council was attended by a number of bishops from across Anglo-Saxon England. Bede also records royal attendance, as King Ecgfrith of Northumbria was present. The Council of Hertford acted as a milestone in the organisation of the Anglo-Saxon Church, as the decrees passed by its delegates focused on issues of authority and structure within the church. The council helped achieve unification in the English Church.

== Attendees ==
Besides Theodore, Bede records four other bishops being present. These were: Bisi, bishop of the East Angles; Putta, bishop of Rochester; Leuthere, bishop of the West Saxons; and Winfrith, bishop of Mercia. Wilfrid of Northumbria was not present but was represented by proctors. As well as the bishops, ‘many teachers of the church’ attended, and Titill the notary was present to document the decisions made. Despite there being few bishops in attendance, these bishops came from across Anglo-Saxon England, so the council was national in scope.

In the chronological summary of his Ecclesiastical History, Bede records that King Ecgfrith was present at the council. This information is absent from Bede's main account of the synod in IV.5, and details of Ecgfrith's role at Hertford are unknown. Despite Ecgfrith's presence, Hertford was ecclesiastical in focus. Bede attests that it was Theodore who summoned the council and had authority over its proceedings. Bede describes Theodore as ‘the first of the archbishops whom the whole English Church consented to obey’. Theodore is depicted by Bede as an authority figure at Hertford, convening the synod and dictating to the notary Titill that which needed to be recorded.

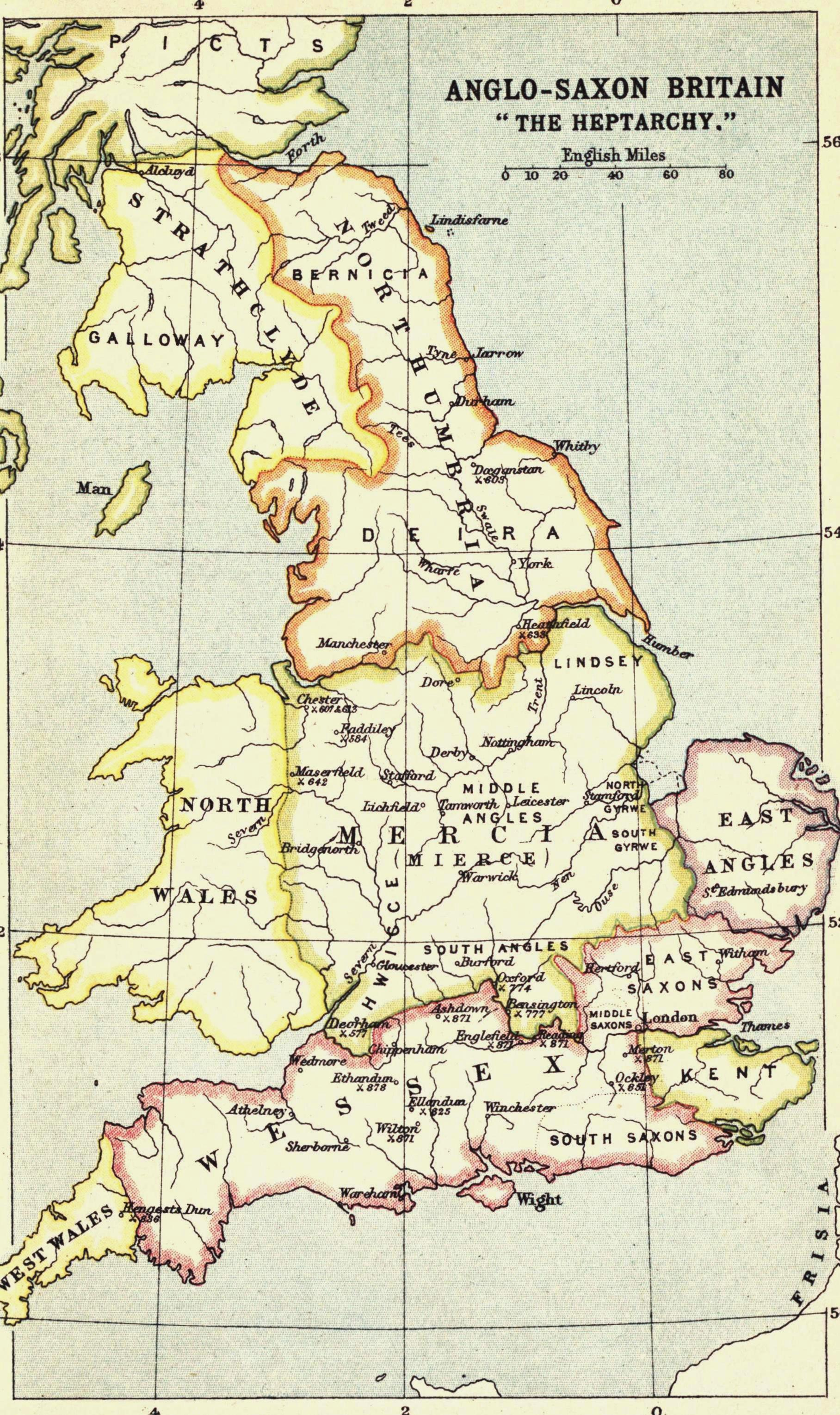
Map of Anglo-Saxon England, displaying the 'heptarchy': the seven kingdoms which existed from the fifth century until their unification in the tenth.

== Dating ==
The dating of the Council of Hertford is contentious, as the date Bede attributes to the council contradicts the dating clause of the text of the council. Bede writes that the synod took place in 673, while the synod text asserts that the bishops met ‘on 24 September, in the first indiction’, which was 672. Bede also records that the council occurred ‘in the third year of Ecgfrith’s reign’. As September 673 fell in the fourth year of his reign, Bede's ascription of 673 was likely erroneous.

There is debate over the cause of this dating confusion, but the historical consensus is that the synod of Hertford occurred in 672 not 673. Kirby has argued that Bede mistakenly attributed the date of the council to 673 because he confused its date with the year of the death of King Egbert. Wood more generally argues that Bede must have made some form of chronological mistake, while Levison and Harrison attribute the 673 date to Bede's use of Dionysiac Easter tables. Cubitt has argued that the Council of Haethfield ‘undoubtedly’ met in 679, so Bede's incorrect ascription of 680 indicates that his chronology was amiss and that the dating of the document of Hertford should be followed.

== Location ==
As Hertford (Herutford) is a common name, it is uncertain exactly where the council occurred geographically. Four Heortfords were recorded in Domesday Book, but Cubitt argues Hertford in Hertfordshire is most likely, especially considering its prominence by the eleventh century. Geographically, Hertford is located near Ermine Street and on the River Lea. So, Hertford was accessible for the attendees of the synod, who were travelling from across England.

On the other hand, the country round Hertford, Hertfordshire, was then in the diocese of London, but that see was vacant (it had no bishop), whereas the council was chaired by Bisi, bishop of the East Angles, in whose diocese lay another candidate for the venue of the council, namely Hartford, Cambridgeshire. There may not have been a settlement at Hertford, Hertfordshire, suitable to host such a meeting.

== Proceedings ==
As well as the decrees of the council, the synod text includes Theodore's introduction, in which the proceedings are explained. This gives insight into the structuring of Anglo-Saxon synods, Rumble suggesting it is ‘unusual’ to have such a detailed account of the proceedings of an assembly recorded.

Theodore assembled the bishops ‘each in his own place’, likely according to seniority, as ruled in the eighth canon of the council. Theodore addressed the bishops, asking them ‘if they were willing to keep the canonical decrees’ of the fathers, to which they agree enthusiastically in unison. Then, he presented a book of canons and highlighted ten chapters which were ‘specially necessary’. These chapters are discussed and then ratified by the attendees. Theodore then concluded by asserting the gravity of adherence to these canons, and warning of the consequences of disobedience.

== Creed ==
The chapters discussed are summarised as follows:

Chapter One

That Easter Day is to be kept ‘at the same time, namely on the Sunday after the fourteenth day of the moon of the first month’. This was confirming the English adherence to the Roman calculation of Easter, as decided at the Synod of Whitby in 664.

Chapter Two

That ‘no bishop intrude into the diocese of another bishop’, and rather ‘be content’ with their own diocesan rule.

Chapter Three

That bishops are not to interfere ‘in any way’ with monasteries, nor ‘forcibly’ take any monastic property. Rumble has emphasised that this decree still allowed the local bishop to participate in the election of abbots in his diocese thereby not disregarding the right given by the Rule of St Benedict.

Chapter Four

That monks are not to ‘wander from place to place’, meaning between monasteries. They may only do so if they have ‘letters dimissory from their own abbot’.

Chapter Five

That clergy are not to ‘leave their own bishop nor wander about at will’. Clergy are not to be ‘received anywhere without letters commendatory from his own bishop’. The ‘receiver and the received’ risk excommunication if this is not obeyed. Godfrey has argued that chapters four and five, concerning wandering clerics and monks, were significant because they indicated ‘the end of the migratory stage in the Conversion’, and the establishment of a stable diocesan system.

Chapter Six

That travelling bishops and clergy are to be ‘content with the hospitality offered them’, and not to exercise any ‘priestly function’ without the bishop of the diocese's permission.

Chapter Seven

That a synod is to occur ‘twice yearly’. However, this proposal prompted discussion and after ‘hindrances’ emerged, it was thus decided that the bishops were to meet annually on 1 August at Clofesho. The location of Clofesho is unknown, and Cubitt has demonstrated that in practice this ruling was not followed.

Chapter Eight

That no bishop is to ‘claim precedence over another bishop out of ambition’, but that rank is according to ‘order of consecration’.

Chapter Nine

That ‘more bishops shall be created as the number of the faithful increases’. This measure was discussed but no decision was reached at this synod. This marked the introduction of Theodore's plan to create more dioceses, a policy which he continually advocated.

Chapter Ten

Concerning marriage. Reasserting that ‘nothing be allowed but lawful wedlock’.

== Significance ==
The Council of Hertford denotes the introduction of the English Church to ‘synodical government’, which was an established format on the Continent. The influential Synod of Whitby predates the Council of Hertford, but Whitby was specifically convened to discuss the controversial issue of the dating of Easter. Thus, Hertford was the first instance in which the bishops convened to discuss general ecclesiastical issues, and so was the definitive beginning of an Anglo-Saxon conciliar tradition.

In being the first national synod, the Council of Hertford acted as a precedent for future synods. These meetings were not as frequent as Theodore intended at Hertford, but later councils such as Hatfield clearly were influenced by the structures put in place at Hertford. Cubitt has emphasised that, while Greek and Roman councils acted as the ‘ultimate model’, the early Anglo-Saxon councils ‘set the style’ for future proceedings.
