= Herefrith =

9th-century Bishop of Winchester

- Bishop of Winchester
- Appointed: before 825
- Term ended: 836
- Predecessor: Wigthegn
- Successor: Eadhun

Orders
- Consecration: before 825

Personal details
- Died: 836
- Denomination: Christian

Herefrith was a medieval Bishop of Winchester. He was consecrated before 825. He died in 836. However, he never appears on charters except with Wigthegn.

== Citations ==
Christian titles
Preceded by Wigthegn	Bishop of Winchester before 825–836	Succeeded by Eadhun
