= John de Caleto =

Anglo-Norman abbot (c. 1205–1263)

John de Caleto, or John de Caux (c. 1205 – 3 March 1263), born in Normandy, was Abbot of Peterborough Abbey and Treasurer of England.

== Life ==
Caleto was probably a native of the Pays de Caux. He is called John of Caen (Johannes de Cadamo) by Matthew Paris, and other writers give his cognomen in the various forms De Calceto, De Cauz, De Cauaz, De Caus, and De Chauce. The Peterborough chronicler, Walter of Whittlesey, writing in the fourteenth century, states that he was born in Normandy, of a noble family, being related to Eleanor of Provence, the queen of Henry III, and entered the monastic life when seven years of age.

=== Prior of Winchester monastery ===
Coming over to England at an early age, he became a monk of the monastery of St Swithun in Winchester, and was chosen as Prior of the monastery in 1247. In 1249 William Hotot, Abbot of Peterborough, had been accused by his monks to Robert Grosseteste, Bishop of Lincoln, of enriching his relatives at the expense of the church. The Bishop threatened William with deposition, but he anticipated the sentence by a professedly voluntary resignation. It was reported to Henry III that the real motive of the hostility of the monks to William was that he was favourable to the royal cause. The King was very angry, and ordered the monks to elect John de Caleto as Hotot's successor. They did this, although Matthew Paris intimates that the new abbot was unwelcome to them both on the ground of being a Norman and on that of belonging to another religious house. The royal assent to the election of John de Caleto was signified on 15 January 1250.

=== Abbot of Peterborough and Treasurer of England ===
His administration of the abbey was zealous and wise, and he seems soon to have succeeded in overcoming his unpopularity with the monks. One of his acts was to invite his predecessor to take up his residence at Oxney, close to Peterborough, and to assign to him during his life the portion of four monks from the cellar and kitchen of the monastery, deducting it from the allowance which he was entitled to claim for his own table.

It was the custom of Henry III to appoint the heads of Benedictine houses – greatly, as Matthew Paris complains, to the detriment of the wealth of the order – to act as itinerant justices. The Abbot of Peterborough was nominated to that office in 1254, and from that year to 1258 his name occurs several times at the head of the list of justices at Buckingham, Derby, Lincoln, and Bedford.

He built the infirmary of Peterborough Abbey, and presented a great bell to the church, bearing the inscription Ion de Caux Abbas Oswaldo contulit hoc vas ("Abbot John de Caux gave this bell to St Oswald"). Among many other benefactions to the abbey he gave five books, the titles of which are enumerated by Simon Gunton "from an old manuscript".

In 1260, according to most of the authorities (although the chronicle of Thomas Wykes places this event in 1258), he was appointed the King's Treasurer, retaining, however, his office as Abbot of Peterborough. His secular employments rendered it necessary for him to be frequently absent from the monastery, but Walter of Whittlesey states that he exercised strict control over its management, so that the interests of the house did not suffer. As Treasurer of England, the King's official correspondence shows that he was fully involved in the work, and had the King's confidence. From August to October 1262 he received many letters from the King, at that time in Paris, on various matters.

=== Death ===
John de Caleto died in London on 3 March 1263; it can be inferred from contemporary documents that the death was unexpected. His body was brought to Peterborough, and buried in the aisle on the south side of the choir, in front of the altar of St Andrew. He was succeeded in the office of Treasurer of England by Nicholas of Ely.
