= Ælfsige II (bishop of Winchester) =

11th-century Bishop of Winchester

- Bishop of Winchester
- Appointed: between 1012 and 1013
- Term ended: 1032
- Predecessor: Æthelwold II
- Successor: Ælfwine of Winchester

Orders
- Consecration: between 1012 and 1014

Personal details
- Died: 1032
- Denomination: Christian

Ælfsige was a medieval Bishop of Winchester. He was consecrated between 1012 and 1013. He died in 1032. In his will, he named Ealdorman Ælfheah as the guardian of his relatives and his last testament, as well as an estate at Crondall.

== Citations ==
Christian titles
| Preceded by Æthelwold II | Bishop of Winchester c. 1013–1032 | Succeeded by Ælfwine of Winchester |
