= Cenwulf of Winchester =

11th-century Bishop of Winchester

Cenwulf
- Bishop of Winchester
- Appointed: 1006
- Term ended: 1006
- Predecessor: Aelfheah II
- Successor: Æthelwold II

Orders
- Consecration: 1006

Personal details
- Died: 1006
- Denomination: Christian

Cenwulf was a medieval Bishop of Winchester, and had been abbot of Peterborough before that. He was consecrated and died in 1006.

== Citations ==
Christian titles
Preceded by Aelfheah II	Bishop of Winchester; 1006	Succeeded by Æthelwold II
