= Nicholas of Ely =

13th-century bishop, and Treasurer of England

- Bishop of Winchester
- Church: Catholic Church
- Appointed: 2 March 1268
- Installed: 27 May 1268
- Term ended: 12 February 1280
- Predecessor: John Gervais
- Successor: Robert Burnell
- Other posts: Bishop of Worcester; Archdeacon of Ely

Orders
- Consecration: 19 September 1266

Personal details
- Died: 12 February 1280
- Denomination: Catholic

Lord Chancellor
- In office 1260–1261
- Monarch: Henry III of England
- Preceded by: Henry Wingham
- Succeeded by: Walter de Merton

Lord Chancellor
- In office 1263–1263
- Monarch: Henry III of England
- Preceded by: Walter de Merton
- Succeeded by: John Chishull

Lord High Treasurer
- In office 1263–1263
- Monarch: Henry III of England
- Preceded by: John of Caux
- Succeeded by: Henry

Nicholas of Ely was Lord Chancellor of England, Bishop of Worcester, Bishop of Winchester, and Lord High Treasurer in the 13th century.

== Life ==
Nicholas was Archdeacon of Ely when he was first appointed chancellor by Henry III in 1260, but he was sacked in favour of Walter de Merton in 1261. His politics were in favour of the Montfortian dispensation in parliament created by the Provisions of Oxford. He supported the new activism for which compromises could be extracted on liberties from the King in exchange for voting money. But on his return from France, Henry III was absolved by the Pope from upholding the provisions. A bull was published in which the reforms were renounced. Both the Justiciar, Hugh Despenser, and the Chancellor were dismissed in favour of the faction around the Marcher Lords. However the offices of state were not abolished, and nor would the overthrow of the provisions mean punishment for the former officials.

Nicholas also held prebends in the diocese of London and was a papal chaplain. Nicholas was a popular reformist figure when he returned to office, although De Montfort insisted that the Council now had the power to appoint, he was appointed Treasurer at the Oxford parliament in April 1263. Montfort's victory at Windsor and Bristol over the royalists could mean that Nicholas would once more be favoured by his ally, he was granted the office of Chancellor in August, but lost both offices later in the year. He was elected to the see of Worcester about 8 June 1266 and consecrated on 19 September 1266. He was enthroned at Worcester Cathedral on 26 September 1266.

Nicholas was translated to the see of Winchester on 2 March 1268 by Pope Clement IV. He was enthroned at Winchester Cathedral on 27 May 1268.

Nicholas died on 12 February 1280.

== Citations ==
Political offices
Preceded by Henry Wingham	Lord Chancellor; 1260–1261	Succeeded by Walter de Merton
Preceded by Walter de Merton	Lord Chancellor; 1263	Succeeded by John Chishull
Preceded by John of Caux	Lord High Treasurer; 1263	Succeeded by Henry
Catholic Church titles
Preceded by Walter de Cantilupe	Bishop of Worcester; 1266–1268	Succeeded by Godfrey Giffard
Preceded by John Gervais	Bishop of Winchester; 1268–1280	Succeeded by Robert Burnell
