= Cyneberht of Winchester =

8th and 9th-century Bishop of Winchester

Cyneberht
- Bishop of Winchester
- Appointed: between 781 and 785
- Term ended: between 801 and 803
- Predecessor: Dudd
- Successor: Ealhmund

Personal details
- Died: between 801 and 803
- Denomination: Christian

Cyneberht was a medieval Bishop of Winchester. He was consecrated between 781 and 785. In 801 he accompanied Archbishop Æthelhard of Canterbury to Rome. Cyneberht died between 801 and 803.

== Citations ==
Christian titles
Preceded by Dudd	Bishop of Winchester c. 783–c. 802	Succeeded by Ealhmund
