= Henry Woodlock =

14th-century Bishop of Winchester

- Bishop of Winchester
- Appointed: between 23 and 29 January 1305
- Term ended: 28 or 29 June 1316
- Predecessor: John of Pontoise
- Successor: John Sandale

Orders
- Consecration: 30 May 1305

Personal details
- Died: either 28 or 29 June 1316
- Denomination: Catholic

Henry Woodlock was a Bishop of Winchester. He is sometimes referred to as Henry de Merewell, from the place of his birth, a manor near Winchester belonging to the bishop.

Before his election as bishop, he had been Prior of the Priory of St. Swithun (1295–1305), the Benedictine monastery which provided the clergy of the Cathedral of Winchester. He was the first Prior to have been elected bishop. In his correspondence as bishop, Henry Woodlock therefore calls himself Frater Henricus.

King Edward I granted permission for an election to take place at Winchester on 23 December 1304, and Henry Woodlock was elected on 23 January 1305. The King granted his assent on 29 January 1305. The Metropolitan, Archbishop Robert Winchelsey of Canterbury, conducted the usual investigation into the canonical validity of the election and the character and suitability of the Elect, and on 10 March notified the King that he had conducted the examination and confirmed Bishop-elect Woodlock. On 12 March, the King granted the Bishop the temporalities of the diocese. Woodlock was consecrated in Canterbury Cathedral on 30 May 1305. He was enthroned at Winchester Cathedral on 10 October 1305.

On 25 February 1308, Bishop Woodlock, who had obtained a special commission from the exiled Archbishop (and been the choice of the King), performed the coronation of King Edward II and Queen Isabella at Westminster Abbey, in a ceremony organized by Piers Gaveston.

Bishop Henry Woodlock consecrated Gilbert de Segrave Bishop of London at Canterbury on 25 November 1313, since the see of Canterbury was vacant at the time.

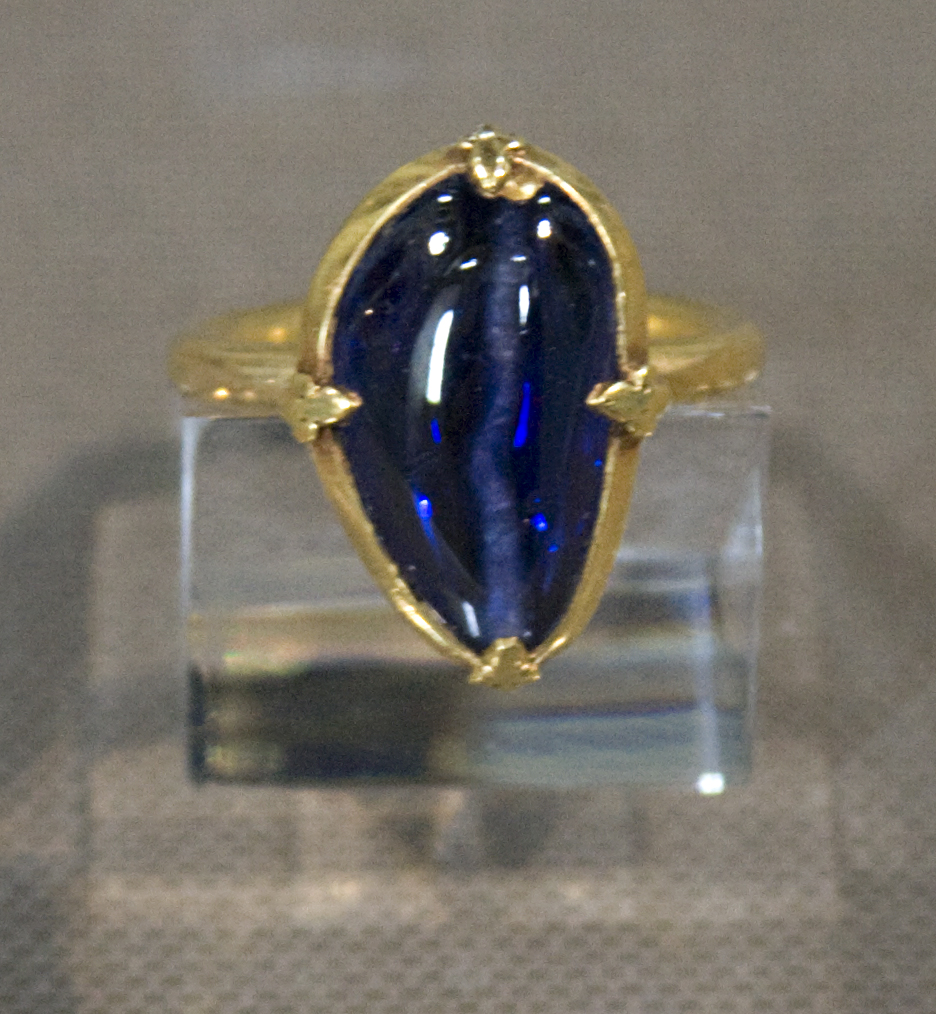
Ring found in Woodlock's grave, now in Winchester Cathedral

He died at Farnham Castle on 28 June 1316, and was buried in Winchester Cathedral.

== Bibliography ==
- Cassan, Stephen Hyde (1827). The Lives of the Bishops of Winchester from Birmius. Vol. I. London: Rivingyon. pp. 177–178.
- Denton, Jeffrey H. (2002). Robert Winchelsey and the Crown 1294-1313: A Study in the Defence of Ecclesiastical Liberty. Cambridge University Press. pp. 15, 36, 50, 259. ISBN 978-0-521-89397-8.
- Fryde, E. B.; Greenway, D. E.; Porter, S.; Roy, I. (1996). Handbook of British Chronology (Third revised ed.). Cambridge: Cambridge University Press. ISBN 0-521-56350-X.
- Goodman, A. W. (ed.). Registrum Henrici Woodlock dioecesis Wintoniensis 2 vols. (Oxford 1940, 1941) [Canterbury and York Society, vols. XLIII, XLIV].

Catholic Church titles
Preceded by John of Pontoise	Bishop of Winchester; 1305–1316	Succeeded by John Sandale
