= Andrew of London =

13th-century Bishop of Winchester

- Bishop of Winchester-elect
- Elected: 3 February 1261
- Quashed: before 22 June 1262
- Predecessor: Aymer de Valence
- Successor: William de Taunton
- Previous post: Prior of Winchester

Personal details
- Died: after 8 April 1278
- Denomination: Catholic

Andrew of London was a medieval Bishop of Winchester elect. He was elected bishop in a disputed election held on 3 February 1261, when Andrew won a minority of the votes of the cathedral chapter, and William de Taunton won the majority. Andrew held the office of Prior of Winchester at the time of the disputed election. He probably was forced into the office of prior by the previous bishop of Winchester, Aymer de Valence about 1255. He received a dispensation for his illegitimacy on 10 December 1258 from Pope Alexander IV and became a papal chaplain in 1259. The election to bishop of both men was quashed by the pope before 22 June 1262, and Andrew attempted to recover the office of prior, but was unsuccessful. He died sometime after 8 April 1278 when he was once more unsuccessful in regaining the priorate.

Catholic Church titles
Preceded by Aymer de Valence	Bishop of Winchester; 1261–1262	Succeeded by William de Taunton
