= John of Pontoise =

13th-century Bishop of Winchester

- Bishop of Winchester
- Appointed: 9 June 1282
- Installed: September 1282
- Term ended: 5 December 1304
- Predecessor: Richard de la More
- Successor: Henry Woodlock
- Previous post: Archdeacon of Exeter

Orders
- Consecration: before 15 June 1282

Personal details
- Died: 5 December 1304
- Denomination: Catholic

John of Pontoise (Latin: Johan de Pontissara; died 1304) was a medieval Bishop of Winchester in the Kingdom of England, serving from 1282 to 1304.

== Life ==
John of Pontoise was from Pontoise in Seine-et-Oise in France, but spent much of his life in England. In 1280, he was briefly Chancellor of the University of Oxford. He was an Archdeacon of Exeter and a papal chaplain before Pope Martin IV provided him to the see of Winchester on 9 June 1282; he was consecrated before 15 June 1282. He was enthroned at Winchester Cathedral in September 1282.

In 1303, he helped negotiate the Treaty of Paris that ended the 1294–1303 Gascon War.

John of Pontoise died on 4 December 1304.

Academic offices
Preceded by Eustace de Normanville	Chancellor of the University of Oxford; 1280	Succeeded by Henry de Stanton
Catholic Church titles
Preceded by Richard de la More	Bishop of Winchester; 1282–1304	Succeeded by Henry Woodlock
