= Hædde =

Bishop of Winchester (died 705)

Saint Hædde
- Bishop of Winchester
- Appointed: 676
- Term ended: probably 7 July 705
- Predecessor: Leuthere
- Successor: Daniel

Personal details
- Born: Headingley, West Yorkshire
- Died: probably 7 July 705
- Denomination: Christian

Sainthood
- Feast day: 7 July
- Venerated in: Eastern Orthodoxy; Roman Catholicism; Anglican Communion
- Title as Saint: Bishop and Monk
- Shrines: Old Minster, Winchester Cathedral (destroyed)

Hædde (Note: Or Hedda, Hedde, Haedda, Haeddi, Heddi, St Hædde) (died 705) was a medieval monk and Bishop of Winchester.

== Life ==
Hædde is believed to have been born in Headingley, Leeds, and became a monk of Whitby Abbey.

He was consecrated by Theodore of Tarsus in 676, and became the first West Saxon bishop to reside at Winchester instead of Dorchester-on-Thames. His episcopate spanned the reigns of four kings of the West Saxons, namely Centwine, Caedwalla and Ine. He died about 7 July 705, although the Anglo-Saxon Chronicle states that he died in 703. In the law code of King Ine of Wessex, the bishop is mentioned as contributing to the laws. After his death, he was revered as a saint with a feast day of 7 July, and his large diocese was split in two, part of the area forming the Diocese of Sherborne.

== Citations ==
Christian titles
Preceded by Leuthere	Bishop of Winchester; 676–705	Succeeded by Daniel
