= Daniel of Winchester =

8th-century Bishop of Winchester

Daniel
- Bishop of Winchester
- Appointed: 705
- Term ended: 744
- Predecessor: Hædde
- Successor: Hunfrith

Personal details
- Died: after 744
- Denomination: Christian

Daniel (Danihel) of Winchester (died 745) was Bishop of the West Saxons, and Bishop of Winchester from c. 705 to 744.

== Life ==
The prominent position which he held among the English clergy of his time can best be appreciated from the fact that he was the intimate friend of Aldhelm at Sherborne, of Bede at Jarrow and of Boniface in Germany. He was one of Bede's informants for historical information contained in Bede's Ecclesiastical History.

Daniel was consecrated to succeed Hædde whose vast diocese was then broken up; Dorset, Wiltshire, Somerset, and Berkshire became the see of Sherborne under Aldhelm, while Daniel retained only Hampshire, Surrey, and Sussex, and of these Sussex soon after was constituted a separate diocese. It was while he was bishop that the diocese for the South Saxons was established at Selsey.

Daniel like Aldhelm had been educated under the Irish scholar Maildubh at Malmesbury Abbey and it was to Malmesbury that he retired in his old age when loss of sight compelled him to resign the bishopric. There, no doubt, he had also learnt the scholarship for which he was famous among his contemporaries and which made Bede turn to him as the man best able to supply information regarding the church history of the south and west of Britain. Daniel, however, is best remembered for his intimate connection with St. Boniface. It was from Daniel that the latter received commendatory letters when he started for Rome, and to Daniel he continually turned for counsel during his missionary labours in Germany.

Two letters of Daniel to Boniface are preserved. In the second of these epistles, which was written after his loss of sight, Daniel takes farewell of his correspondent: "Farewell, farewell, thou hundredfold dearest one." Another letter gives advice to Boniface on how best to weaken pagan faith in their gods. Letters from Boniface to Daniel are still extant, where Boniface asks the bishop for a book that had previously belonged to Boniface's teacher.

Daniel had made a pilgrimage to Rome in 721 and in 731 assisted at the consecration of Archbishop Tatwine. He seems never to have been honoured as a saint. A vision recorded in "Monumenta Moguntina", No. 112, perhaps implies that he was considered to be lacking in energy; nonetheless it would follow from William of Malmesbury's reference (Gest. Pont., I, 357) to a certain stream in which Daniel used to stand the whole night long to cool his passions, that he was a man of remarkable austerity.

Daniel resigned his see in 744.

== Citations ==
Christian titles
Preceded by Hædde	Bishop of Winchester; 705–744	Succeeded by Hunfrith
