= Wigthegn =

9th-century Bishop of Winchester

- Bishop of Winchester
- Appointed: between 805 and 814
- Term ended: 833
- Predecessor: Ealhmund
- Successor: Herefrith

Orders
- Consecration: between 805 and 814

Personal details
- Died: 836
- Denomination: Christian

Wigthegn was a medieval Bishop of Winchester. He was consecrated between 805 and 814. He died in 836.

== Citations ==
Christian titles
Preceded by Ealhmund	Bishop of Winchester c. 809–836	Succeeded by Herefrith
