= Eadhun =

9th-century Bishop of Winchester

- Bishop of Winchester
- Appointed: between 833 and 838
- Term ended: 838
- Predecessor: Herefrith
- Successor: Helmstan

Orders
- Consecration: between 833 and 838

Personal details
- Died: 838
- Denomination: Christian

Eadhun was a medieval Bishop of Winchester. He was consecrated between 833 and 838. He died in 838.

== Citations ==
Christian titles
Preceded by Herefrith	Bishop of Winchester c. 835–838	Succeeded by Helmstan
