= Oliver fitz Regis =

Illegitimate son of John, King of England

- Born: c. 1199
- Died: 1218/1219
- House: Plantagenet
- Father: King John of England
- Mother: Hawise

Oliver fitz Regis or Oliver Fitzroy (died 1218/1219) was an illegitimate son of John, King of England.

Oliver's mother was Hawise (Hadwisa), a sister of Fulk FitzWarin. He was probably born before John became king in 1199.

Oliver fought for his father during the First Barons' War. In June 1216, he was in command of Wolvesey Castle when it was besieged by Prince Louis of France and the rebel barons. In April 1217, as Louis approached Dover Castle from the sea, Oliver and William of Cassingham attacked the small force which Louis had left behind after the failed siege of Dover in 1216. As a result, Louis was forced to land at Sandwich.

In October 1215, Oliver's father rewarded him with a cask of wine. In November 1215, he was given the castle of Tonge. The regents of his half-brother, Henry III, confirmed this grant in June 1217. In July 1216, he was granted the manor of Erdington. In March 1218, he granted control of the estate of Hamedon until Eve de Tracy could reclaim by payment of sixty marks. Eve was probably Oliver's mother's sister.

Oliver joined the Fifth Crusade in 1218. In doing so, he may have been discharging his late father's unfulfilled vow. He raised 100 marks for his venture by pawning a royal wardship. With a group of English crusaders, he landed at the siege of Damietta in September or August. He died at Damietta in late 1218 or early 1219. It is unclear if he died of an illness or in battle. His body was returned to England and buried in Westminster Abbey. There is no record that he married.

== Works cited ==
- Beazley, C. R. (1895). "Oliver (d.1219)" . In Lee, Sidney (ed.). Dictionary of National Biography. Vol. 42. London: Smith, Elder & Co.
- Giles, Keith Richard (1987). The Emperor Frederick II's Crusade, 1215 – c. 1231 (PhD dissertation). University of Keele.
- Hanley, Catherine (2016). Louis: The French Prince Who Invaded England. Yale University Press. ISBN 9780300217452.
- Lloyd, Simon (2004). "Oliver [Oliver fitz Regis]". Oxford Dictionary of National Biography (online ed.). Oxford University Press. doi:10.1093/ref:odnb/20717. (Subscription, Wikipedia Library access or UK public library membership required.)
- Painter, Sidney (2020) [1949]. The Reign of King John. Johns Hopkins University Press. ISBN 9781421435169.
- Tyerman, Christopher (1988). England and the Crusades, 1095–1588. University of Chicago Press.
