= Æthelwold II (bishop of Winchester) =

11th-century bishop of Winchester

- Bishop of Winchester
- Appointed: between 1006 and 1007
- Term ended: between 1012 and 1013
- Predecessor: Cenwulf of Winchester
- Successor: Ælfsige II

Orders
- Consecration: between 1006 and 1007

Personal details
- Died: between 1012 and 1014
- Denomination: Christian

Æthelwold II was a medieval Bishop of Winchester. He was consecrated between 1006 and 1007. He died between 1012 and 1013.

== Citations ==
Christian titles
Preceded by Cenwulf of Winchester	Bishop of Winchester; 1006–c. 1013	Succeeded by Ælfsige II
