= Ecgbald =

8th-century Bishop of Winchester

- Bishop of Winchester
- Appointed: between 759 and 778
- Term ended: between 781 and 784
- Predecessor: Æthelheard
- Successor: Dudd

Personal details
- Died: between 781 and 784
- Denomination: Christian

Ecgbald was a medieval Bishop of Winchester. He was consecrated between 759 and 778. He died between 781 and 784.

== Citations ==
Christian titles
Preceded by Æthelheard	Bishop of Winchester c. 768–c. 783	Succeeded by Dudd
