= Wine (bishop) =

7th-century Bishop of Winchester and Bishop of London

- Bishop of London
- Appointed: 666
- Term ended: before 672
- Predecessor: Cedd
- Successor: Erkenwald
- Other posts: Bishop of Winchester; Dorchester

Orders
- Consecration: 660

Personal details
- Died: before 672
- Denomination: Christian

Wine (Note: Or Wini; Latin: Vini, Vineus, Vinius, Wini) (died before 672) was a medieval Bishop of London, having earlier been consecrated the first Bishop of Winchester.

Wine was consecrated the first bishop of Winchester in 660 and possibly translated to Dorchester around 663. In 666, he was translated from Dorchester to London.

Bede tells us that Wine was ordained bishop in the Frankish kingdom and that King Cenwalh of Wessex installed him after disagreements with the previous Frankish bishop, Agilbert. Wine too was forced to leave after a few years and took refuge with Wulfhere, king of Mercia, who installed him in London, after a payment to Wulfhere.

In 665, while in Wessex, Wine took part with two Welsh or British bishops in the ordination of Chad as bishop of the Northumbrians, an act that was uncanonical because the other two bishops' ordination was not recognised by Rome. This would have resulted in his being disciplined, along with Chad, by Theodore of Tarsus, the new archbishop of Canterbury, who arrived in 669. Since Bede does not list him among the miscreants at this point, it is possible he had died by this date.

Wine died sometime before 672.

== Citations ==
Christian titles
| New creation | Bishop of Winchester; 662–666 | Succeeded by Leuthere |
| Preceded by Cedd | Bishop of London; 666–c. 670 | Succeeded by Erkenwald |
