= Leuthere =

7th-century Bishop of Winchester

- Bishop of Winchester
- Appointed: 670
- Term ended: 676
- Predecessor: Wini
- Successor: Hædde

Personal details
- Died: 676
- Denomination: Christian

Leuthere (or Leutherius) was an Anglo-Saxon Bishop of Winchester, serving between 670 and 676.

Leuthere was consecrated in 670. He died before 676. Bede records that he attended the Council of Hertford in 672.

== Biography ==
=== Family ===
Leuthere was born to a prominent clerical family in Soissons, Neustria. He was a nephew of Agilbert, Bishop of Paris and of Saint Thelchildes, the first Abbess of Jouarre Abbey. Their father, and Leuthere's grandfather, was a wealthy Neustrian noble named Betto-Belfredus. Betto's sister, Moda, married Authaire; who would later go on to father Audoin, Bishop of Rouen and Rado, Mayor of the Palace under Chlothar II.

=== Career ===
Bede records in his Historia Ecclesiastica that Agilbert, Leuthere's uncle, was a preacher in Ireland and was invited to Wessex by King Cenwalh to serve as Bishop. Allegedly, Cenwalh grew tired of Agilbert's "barbarous speaking" and divided the Bishop's see into two dioceses, appointing the Saxon Wini as Bishop of Winchester in 660. This insult led Agilbert to resign his role and retire to Francia, where he served as Bishop of Paris from 666. Wini was also eventually expelled from his position, and Cenwalh sent messengers into Gaul with "humble apologies" asking him to return to his position. Agilbert, being of old age, sent his nephew, Leuthere, then a priest, to serve in his stead. Leuthere was consecrated in Canterbury in 670 by Theodore, Archbishop of Canterbury.

Leuthere first appears in the written record in the year of his consecration, witnessing a grant of land in Somerset from King Cenwalh to Abbot Berhtwald.

Leuthere is the most probable subject of a letter from Saint Aldhelm, during his studies in Kent from 670-672. The letter is published by William of Malmesbury in his Gesta Pontificum Anglorum, allegedly composed to "...Heddam antecessorem suum", the predecessor of Hædde.

Leuthere was present at the Council of Hertford assembled by Archbishop Theodore in 672.

In a charter dated 24 August 675, at the River Bladon, he is recorded granting land in Malmesbury, Wiltshire to Aldhelm for a monastery.

He is recorded in a dateless charter witnessing a grant of 30 hides in Fontmell Brook, Dorset from King Cenred of Wessex to Abbot Bectun.

In November 676, Leuthere witnessed a grant of land from King Osric of Hwicce to Abbess Bertana to form a convent at Bath.

=== Death ===
Bede records that Leuthere died in 676. His successor, Hædde, was consecrated in London by Theodore.

== Citations ==
Christian titles
Preceded by Wini	Bishop of Winchester; 670–before 676	Succeeded by Hædde
