= Ealhmund of Winchester =

9th-century Bishop of Winchester

Ealhmund
- Bishop of Winchester
- Appointed: between 801 and 803
- Term ended: between 805 and 814
- Predecessor: Cyneberht
- Successor: Wigthegn

Orders
- Consecration: between 801 and 803

Personal details
- Died: between 805 and 814
- Denomination: Christian

Ealhmund was a medieval Bishop of Winchester. He was consecrated between 801 and 803. He died between 805 and 814.

== Citations ==
Christian titles
Preceded by Cyneberht	Bishop of Winchester c. 802–c. 809	Succeeded by Wigthegn
