= Hunfrith of Winchester =

8th-century Bishop of Winchester

Hunfrith
- Bishop of Winchester
- Appointed: 744
- Term ended: c. 752
- Predecessor: Daniel
- Successor: Cyneheard

Personal details
- Died: between 749 and 754
- Denomination: Christian

Hunfrith was a medieval Bishop of Winchester.

Hunfrith was consecrated in 744. He died between 749 and 754.

== Citations ==
Christian titles
Preceded by Daniel	Bishop of Winchester; 744–c. 752	Succeeded by Cyneheard
