= Tunbeorht =

9th-century Bishop of Winchester

- Bishop of Winchester
- Appointed: between 871 and 877
- Term ended: between 878 and 879
- Predecessor: Ealhferth
- Successor: Denewulf

Orders
- Consecration: between 871 and 877

Personal details
- Died: between 878 and 879
- Denomination: Christian

Tunbeorht or Tunberht was a medieval Bishop of Winchester. He was consecrated between 871 and 877. He died between 878 and 879.

== Citations ==
Christian titles
Preceded by Ealhferth	Bishop of Winchester c. 875–c. 878	Succeeded by Denewulf
