= Dudd =

8th-century Bishop of Winchester

- Bishop of Winchester
- Appointed: between 781 and 785
- Term ended: between 781 and 785
- Predecessor: Ecgbald
- Successor: Cyneberht

Personal details
- Died: between 781 and 785
- Denomination: Christian

Dudd was a medieval Bishop of Winchester. He was consecrated no earlier than 781 and was dead by 785.

== Citations ==
Christian titles
Preceded by Ecgbald	Bishop of Winchester between 781 and 785	Succeeded by Cyneberht
