= Richard de la More =

13th-century Bishop of Winchester-elect

- Bishop-elect of Winchester
- Province: Canterbury
- Elected: 6 November 1280
- Quashed: 1282
- Term ended: resigned before 9 June 1282
- Predecessor: Robert Burnell
- Successor: John of Pontoise
- Other post: Archdeacon of Winchester

Orders
- Consecration: not consecrated

Personal details
- Died: after 3 May 1285
- Denomination: Roman Catholic

Richard de la More was a medieval clergyman who was Bishop-elect of Winchester from 1280 to 1282. He was also an MP for Gloucestershire from 1290 to 1295.

== Life ==
Richard was subdean of the diocese of Lincoln as well as Archdeacon of Winchester from before 11 September 1280.

Richard was elected to the see of Winchester on 15 November 1280 but resigned in June 1282 before being consecrated. Archbishop John Peckham of Canterbury withheld his confirmation of the election because Richard was a pluralist. Pope Martin IV also quashed the election in 1282.

Richard still held the office of archdeacon until sometime after 19 June 1283, but was only listed as subdean of Lincoln on 3 May 1285. He died sometime after that date. His death was commemorated on 16 June.

== Citations ==
Catholic Church titles
Preceded by Robert Burnell (bishop-elect)	Bishop-elect of Winchester; 1280–1282	Succeeded by John of Pontoise (bishop)
