= Ealhferth =

9th-century Bishop of Winchester

- Bishop of Winchester
- Appointed: between 862 and 867
- Term ended: between 871 and 877
- Predecessor: Swithun
- Successor: Tunbeorht

Orders
- Consecration: between 862 and 867

Personal details
- Died: between 871 and 877
- Denomination: Christian

Ealhferth or Ealhfrith was a medieval Bishop of Winchester. He was consecrated between 862 and 867. He died between 871 and 877.

== Citations ==
Christian titles
| Preceded by Swithun | Bishop of Winchester c. 864 – c. 875 | Succeeded by Tunbeorht |
