= John Gervais =

13th-century Bishop of Winchester

- Bishop of Winchester
- Appointed: 22 June 1262
- Installed: December 1262
- Term ended: January 1268
- Predecessor: William de Taunton
- Successor: Nicholas of Ely
- Previous post: Chancellor of York

Orders
- Consecration: probably 20 September 1262

Personal details
- Died: either 19 or 20 January 1268
- Denomination: Catholic

John Gervais was a medieval Bishop of Winchester.

== Life ==
Gervais was a clerk of the diocese of Exeter and educated in physical sciences. He held the prebends of Fenton and Warthill in the diocese of York before becoming chancellor of the diocese of York. He made a trip to Rome on business about the election of Archbishop Sewal de Bovil to York and became a papal chaplain under Pope Alexander IV. In 1260 he was named Bishop of Carlisle by Archbishop Godfrey Ludham of York, but the election was not effective.

Gervais was nominated to the see of Winchester on 22 June 1262 by papal provision and probably consecrated on 10 September 1262. He was enthroned in Winchester Cathedral about Christmas, 1262.

Gervais died on 19 or 20 January 1268.

== Citations ==
Catholic Church titles
Preceded by William de Taunton	Bishop of Winchester; 1262–1268	Succeeded by Nicholas of Ely
