= Helmstan =

9th-century Bishop of Winchester

- Bishop of Winchester
- Appointed: between 838 and 839
- Term ended: between 844 and 852 or 853
- Predecessor: Eadhun
- Successor: Swithun

Orders
- Consecration: between 839 and 839

Personal details
- Died: between 844 and 852 or in 853
- Denomination: Christian

Helmstan was a medieval Bishop of Winchester. He was consecrated between 838 and 839. He died between 844 and 852 or in 853.

== Citations ==
Christian titles
Preceded by Eadhun	Bishop of Winchester; 838–c. 846	Succeeded by Swithun
