= Agilbert =

7th-century bishop and Catholic saint

Saint Agilbert
- Bishop of Paris
- Diocese: Diocese of Paris
- In office: c. 667 - c.680
- Predecessor: Importunus
- Successor: Sigefrid
- Other post: Bishop of Dorchester (the precursor role to Winchester) (c. 650–660)

Orders
- Consecration: c. 640s–650s

Personal details
- Died: after 10 March 673 Francia
- Buried: Jouarre Abbey, in modern Ile de France
- Denomination: Chalcedonian Christianity

Sainthood
- Feast day: 11 October
- Venerated in: Catholic Church; Eastern Orthodox Church
- Shrines: Jouarre Abbey

Agilbert (fl. c. 650–680) was the second bishop of the West Saxon kingdom and later Bishop of Paris. He is venerated as a saint within the Catholic Church, with his feast day falling on 11 October.

The date and place of Agilbert's birth are unknown, but evidence suggests it took place between 610 and 620. Son of a Neustrian noble named Betto, he was a first cousin of Audoin and related to the Faronids and Agilolfings, and less certainly to the Merovingians. His name, the Frankish language equivalent of Æthelberht, has been taken to suggest a link with the royal family of the Kingdom of Kent.

Agilbert was consecrated as a bishop in Francia before he travelled to Britain. He arrived in the West Saxon kingdom after the return to power of King Cenwalh of Wessex, who had been driven out by Penda of Mercia, either in the late 640s or 650s. He was appointed to succeed Birinus (also later canonised, and attributed with conversion of Wessex to Christianity) as bishop of the West Saxons, or the Wessex folk, who following their seizure of part of Christian Mercia set up the first Wessex see as Bishop of Dorchester, near Oxford. Nothing remains above the surface of the Saxon cathedral, succeeded in the faith by Norman Dorchester Abbey church which has decorative memorials to the two early bishops. Agilbert, according to Bede's Historia ecclesiastica gentis Anglorum, had "spent a long time in Ireland for the purpose of studying the Scriptures". His appointment was due to Cenwalh.

From Bede, it appears that Agilbert did not speak Old English, and it is said that his see was divided in two, with Wine being given half, because King Cenwalh "tired of his barbarous speech", although this may be mistaken. This insult supposedly led to Agilbert's resignation. He then travelled north to Northumbria, where he ordained Wilfrid. He was present at the Synod of Whitby in 664, where he led the pro-Roman party, but he had the young Wilfrid speak on his behalf.

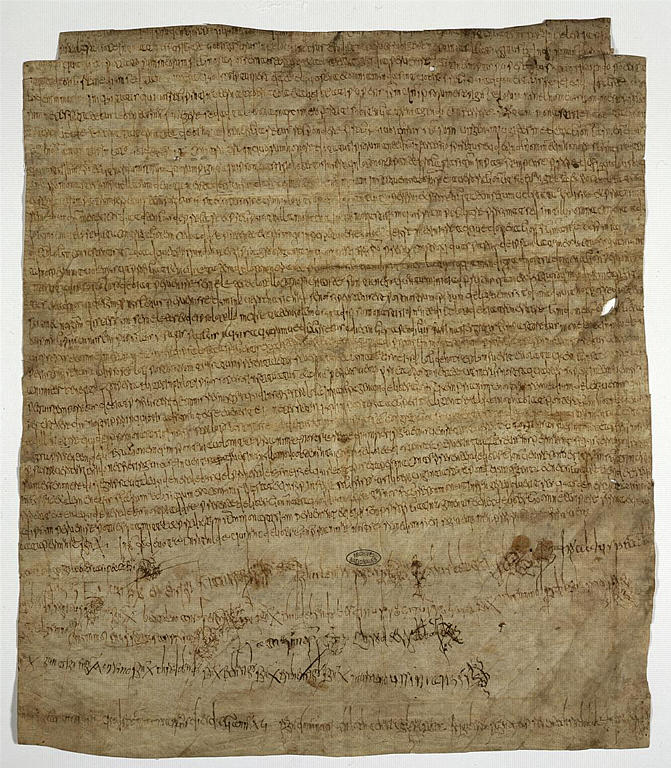
The charter of Clotilde, 10 March 673, endowing the monastery of Bruyères-le-Châtel; witnessed by Agilbert, this is his last appearance in year-dated records

Returning to Francia, Agilbert later took part in Wilfrid's consecration as a bishop at Compiègne. Agilbert became bishop of Paris between 666 and 668, and hosted Theodore of Tarsus. He was later invited to return by Cenwalh, to become Bishop of Winchester, but sent his nephew Leuthhere in his place.

One modern historian, D. P. Kirby, is unsure if Agilbert actually went to Northumbria after being expelled from Dorchester, suggesting it is just as likely that he went directly to the continent.

Agilbert died at some time after 10 March 673, on which date he witnessed Clotilde's foundation charter for the Abbey of Bruyères-le-Châtel, and probably between 679 and 690. He was buried at Jouarre Abbey where his sister Theodechildis was abbess. His fine sculpted sarcophagus can be seen there in the crypts, as can that of his sister.

== Citations ==
Catholic Church titles
Preceded by Birinus	Bishop of Dorchester c. 650–660	Succeeded by Ætla
Preceded by Importunus	Bishop of Paris; 666x668 – 679x690	Succeeded by Sigefrid
