= Æthelgeard =

Æthelgeard, also Æthelheard (fl. 950s) was a 10th-century landowner who was known to have been involved in service to the royal family, likely an official of Eadwig.

He is mentioned being from Frome in Somerset, and also owning estates in modern-day Hertfordshire and Oxfordshire. However, according to the Liber Vitae:Register and Martyrology of New Minster and Hyde Abbey, Winchester, his main landowning interests were in the Winchester area. According to charters dating to the 10th century from the Winchester Archives, where he kept his documents, he was involved in some kind of special service to the royal family and he remained loyal to Eadwig after Edgar the Peaceful's revolt in 957. The archives also reveal that he received grants which were heavily modified or forged by Winchester monks. He is also mentioned in the Chronicles of Abingdon Abbey as being a minister to Eadwig. However, after Edgar came to power in around 959, Æthelgeard ceased to be mentioned. He left a will which read "I, Æthelgeard, grant the estate at Sotwell (now Brightwell-cum-Sotwell in Oxfordshire) after my death to my wife for her lifetime, and then for the need of the souls of both of us to the New Minister in Winchester, for them to use and never to alienate."
