= Æthelheard of Winchester =

8th-century Bishop of Winchester

Æthelheard
- Bishop of Winchester
- Appointed: between 759 and 778
- Term ended: between 759 and 778
- Predecessor: Cyneheard
- Successor: Ecgbald

Personal details
- Died: between 759 and 778
- Denomination: Christian

Æthelheard was a medieval Bishop of Winchester. He was consecrated between 759 and 778. He died between 759 and 778.

== Citations ==
Christian titles
Preceded by Cyneheard	Bishop of Winchester between 759 and 778	Succeeded by Ecgbald
