= Kensham =

Hamlet in Kent, England

Coordinates: 51.0359°N 0.6016°E

- Location within Kent
- District: Tunbridge Wells
- Shire county: Kent
- Region: South East
- Country: England
- Sovereign state: United Kingdom
- Police: Kent
- Fire: Kent
- Ambulance: South East Coast
- UK Parliament: Weald of Kent

Kensham is a hamlet in Kent, between Rolvenden and Sandhurst. In the medieval era it was called Cassingham.
