= Cyneheard of Winchester =

8th-century Bishop of Winchester

Cyneheard
- Bishop of Winchester
- Appointed: 756
- Term ended: between 759 and 778
- Predecessor: Hunfrith
- Successor: Æthelheard

Personal details
- Died: between 759 and 778
- Denomination: Christian

Cyneheard was a medieval Bishop of Winchester.

Cyneheard was consecrated in 756. He died between 759 and 778.

== Citations ==
Christian titles
Preceded by Hunfrith	Bishop of Winchester; 756–c. 768	Succeeded by Æthelheard
