= Aymer de Valence (bishop) =

13th-century Bishop of Winchester

- Bishop of Winchester
- Elected: 4 November 1250
- Term ended: 4 December 1260
- Predecessor: William de Raley
- Successor: Andrew of London

Orders
- Consecration: 16 May 1260

Personal details
- Died: 4 December 1260 Paris
- Denomination: Catholic

Aymer de Valence (Note: Also known as Aymer de Lusignan or Thelmar de Valence) (c. 1222 – 4 December 1260) was a Bishop of Winchester around 1250.

== Life ==
Valence was a half-brother of King Henry III of England; his mother was Isabella of Angoulême, the second wife of King John, his father was Hugh X of Lusignan, the count of La Marche, whom Isabelle married in 1220. He was also the uncle of Aymer de Valence, 2nd Earl of Pembroke.

The children of Isabella's marriage came to England in 1247 in the hope of obtaining court preferment. Aymer received a prebend in the diocese of London. In 1250 the King, by putting strong pressure upon the electors, succeeded in obtaining the election of Aymer to the see of Winchester on 4 November. The appointment was in every way unsuitable. Aymer was illiterate, ignorant of the English language, and wholly secular in his mode of life. Upon his head was concentrated the whole of the popular indignation against the foreign favourites; and he seems to have deserved this unenviable distinction. However, he received confirmation of his election to the see from Pope Innocent IV on 14 January 1251, along with a dispensation to keep his other ecclesiastical income.

He played a role in touching off the baronial reform movement of 1258. On 1 April 1258 Aymer sent a posse to attack men of the magnate John fitz Geoffrey at Shere in Surrey, killing one of them. At a parliament opened at Westminster a week later John fitz Geoffrey demanded justice from the king; Henry excused Aymer, his half-brother, and refused justice thus angering the barons. At the Parliament of Oxford in 1258 he and his brothers repudiated the Provisions of Oxford prepared by the barons. He was pursued to Winchester, besieged in Wolvesey Castle, and finally compelled to surrender and leave the kingdom. He had never been consecrated; accordingly in 1259 the chapter of Winchester proceeded to a new election. Aymer, however, gained the support of Pope Alexander IV, and in January 1259, Alexander IV sent Velascus (a Friar Minor) to England to compel the King and the barons to reinstate Aymer to his bishopric at Winchester. He was on his way back to England when he was overtaken by a fatal illness at Paris, having only been consecrated on 16 May 1260 before his death on 4 December 1260. He is buried in Paris.

== Citations ==
Catholic Church titles
Preceded by William de Raley	Bishop of Winchester; 1250–1260	Succeeded by Andrew of London
