= Wolvesey Palace =

Grade I listed palace in England

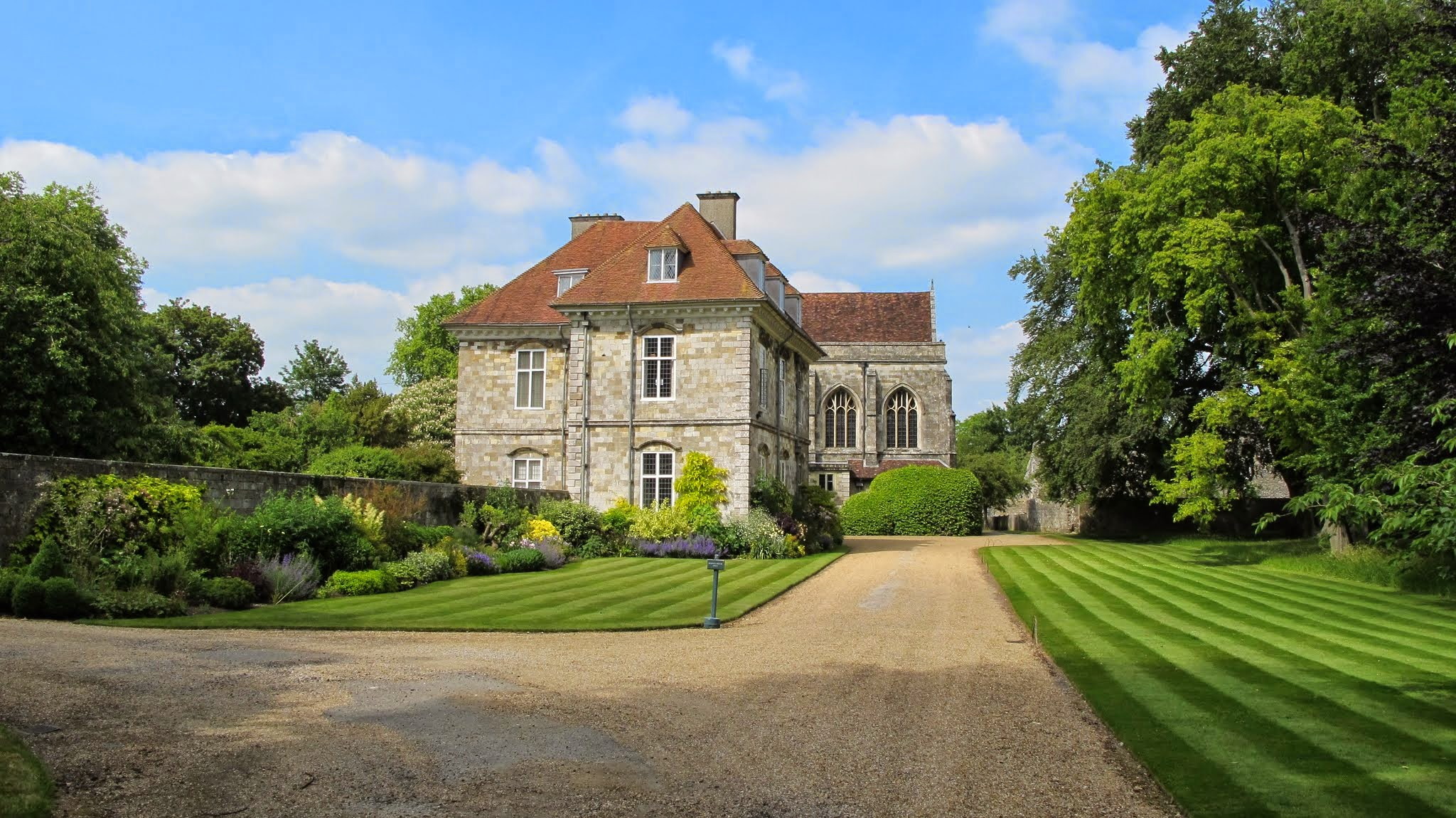
- Wolvesey Palace from the South

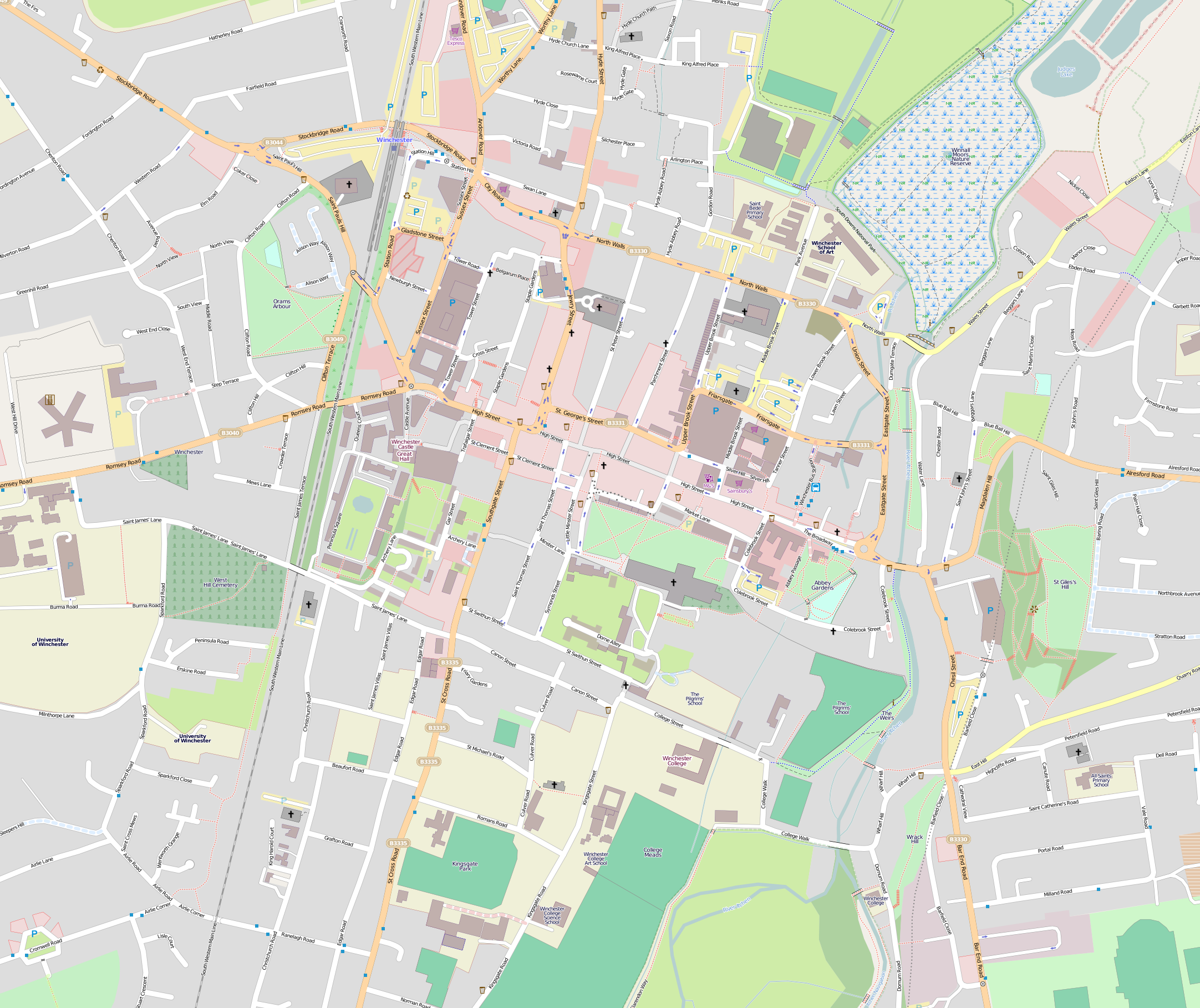
- Location within Central Winchester
- 51°3′31″N 1°18′39″W
- Location: Winchester
- OS grid reference: SU 48403 29068

History
- Built: Late 17th century
- Built for: George Morley

Site notes
- Area: Hampshire
- Architect: Thomas Fitch
- Governing body: Church Commissioners

Listed Building – Grade I
- Designated: 24 March 1950
- Reference no.: 1095510

Listed Building – Grade II
- Official name: Wolvesey Stables
- Designated: 24 March 1950
- Reference no.: 1167333

Wolvesey Palace is the residence of the Bishop of Winchester, located in Winchester, England. The bishops had previously lived in the adjacent Wolvesey Castle.

== Background ==
The site of Wolvesey has been the home of the Bishop of Winchester since at least the late 10th century.

Wolvesey Castle, the medieval bishop's palace, was constructed in the 12th century under William Giffard and Henry of Blois. The castle stopped being regularly used in the mid-16th century, since the bishops preferred their palaces in Farnham and Southwark, but it was not destroyed. Only ruins survive of the 12th-century buildings, including the substructure of the current chapel, which was built in the 15th century as part of Wolvesey Castle.

== History ==
After attempting to renovate Wolvesey Castle, including by refurbishing the chapel and cleaning the moat, George Morley decided to replace the medieval palace with a new palace. Construction began in the late 17th century and finished under Jonathan Trelawny in the early 18th century. Although various reports cite Christopher Wren as the palace's architect, the actual architect was Thomas Fitch.

The original palace had three wings but only the west wing survives. The south and east wings were demolished by Robert Taylor under Brownlow North in 1786 because Farnham Castle remained the bishops' preferred residence. Taylor retained a small part of the south wing, reusing some of the demolished portions to add a new east wall.

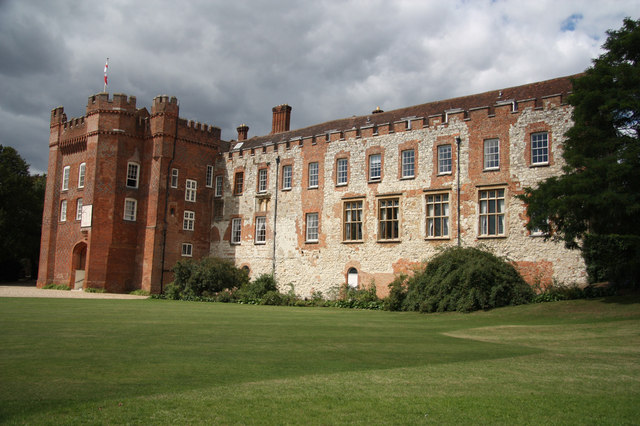
Farnham Castle, preferred residence of the Bishop of Winchester until 1927

Wolvesey was let to private individuals, used by colleges and schools, and as a church house at various points between 1721 and 1927. After Farnham was added to the new Diocese of Guildford and Portsmouth in 1927, W. D. Caröe refurbished the interior such that the bishop could use the palace as their residence again.

== Design ==
=== Exterior ===
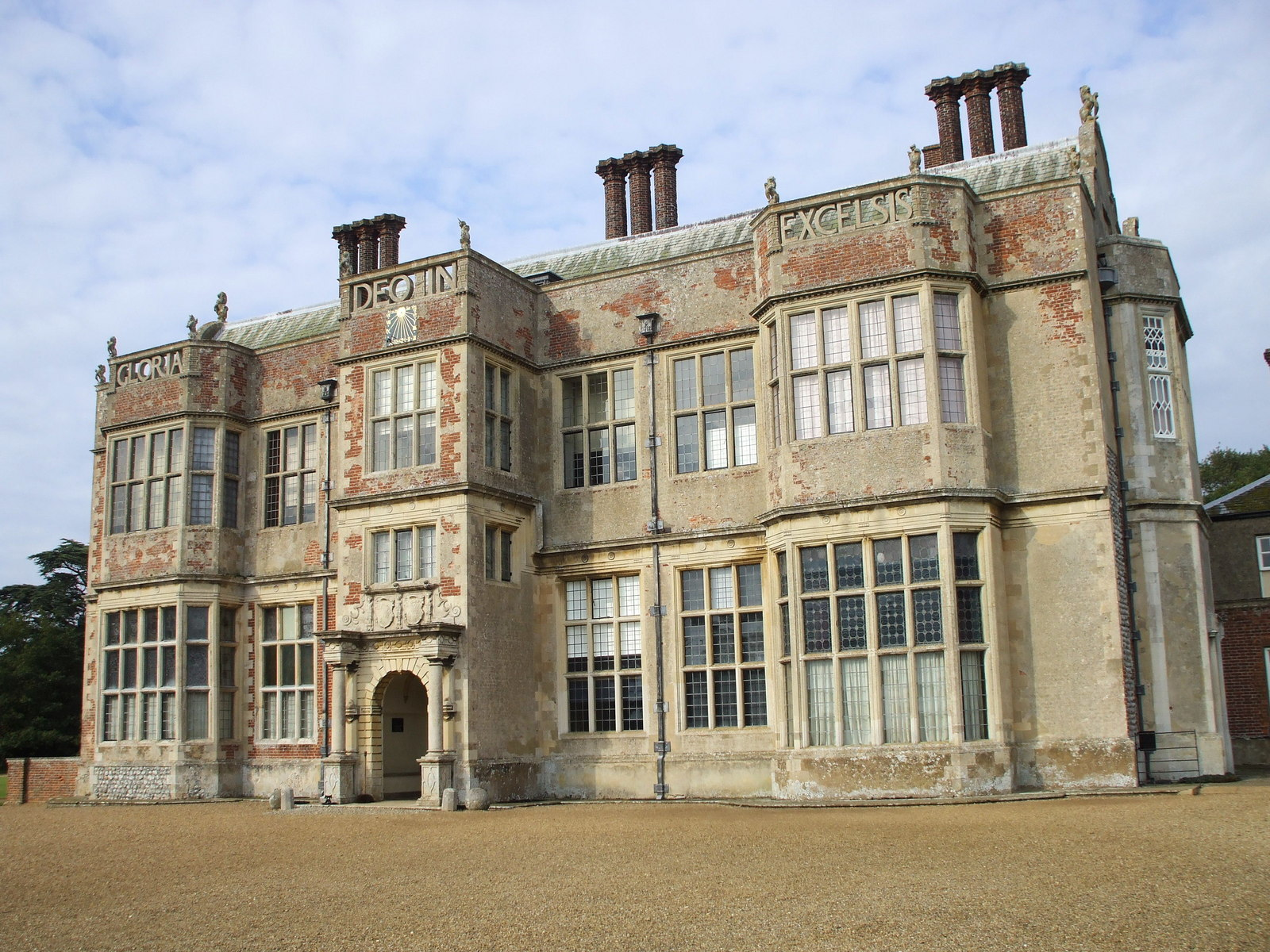
Felbrigg Hall, Norfolk, compared in Pevsner Architectural Guides to Wolvesey Palace

The palace is faced with ashlar, reused from a previously building. The design has been compared to Felbrigg Hall, Norfolk. The doorway on the west side of the west wing has a round pediment on Ionic pilasters, with the arms of Jonathan Trelawny.

=== Interior ===
The wooden overmantel in the dining room is from the late 16th century and is therefore older than the palace itself. It depicts biblical scenes, including Adam and Eve, the Annunciation and the Resurrection. Some of the palace's panelling has mouldings from the 1680s but most is from the early 18th century. The two staircases are from around 1720. Much of the interior was refurbished by W. D. Caröe in 1927 when the castle began to be used by the bishops again.

There is an extensive portrait collection in the palace, including portraits of bishops from William of Wykeham to Michael Scott-Joynt, by artists including Andrew Festing, William Dring, George Henry, Arthur Stockdale Cope, Eden Upton Eddis, Martin Archer Shee, John Jackson, Henry Howard, Michael Dahl, Peter Lely, and Jan Rave. Anthony Thorold was largely responsible for making the series less incomplete than it otherwise would be.

=== Chapel ===
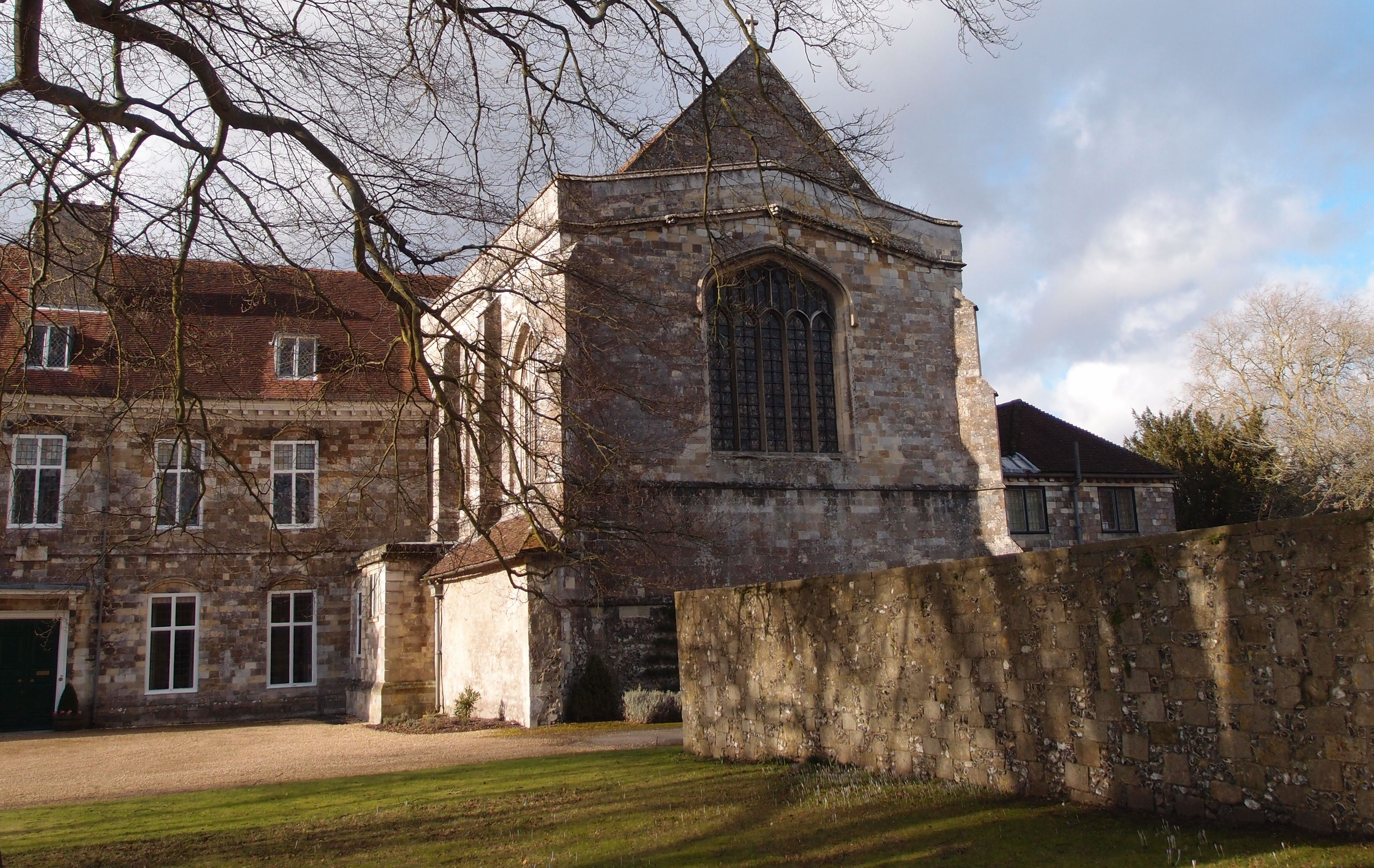
East end of the Chapel

When building Wolvesey Palace, Thomas Fitch retained Wolvesey Castle's chapel, which had been rebuilt in the 1440s. The chapel sits on the infilled 12th-century remains of an earlier room, probably also a chapel, so is raised above the rest of the palace. The entrance to the chapel was through a screen at the west end until W. D. Caröe's refurbishment, which created a new entrance on the south side. The ceiling is from W. D. Caröe's refurbishment in the 1920s but with a new decorative scheme from 1993–1994.

The window tracery is of a perpendicular design and probably dates from the 1670s during Morley's attempts to refurbish the original medieval buildings. The east window has stained glass from 1933 designed by Christopher Webb, depicting people connected to the palace and including a memorial to Theodore Woods.

Most of the chapel's fittings, including the box stalls, the black-and-white pavement, the wainscotting, the west screen, and the gallery above the screen, are from 1671 during Morley's renovation attempts. The altar rail is from the 1680s. The cushions and kneelers are from 1929, made by Lousia Pesel. There is a sculpture by Peter Eugene Ball from 2006.

=== Stables ===
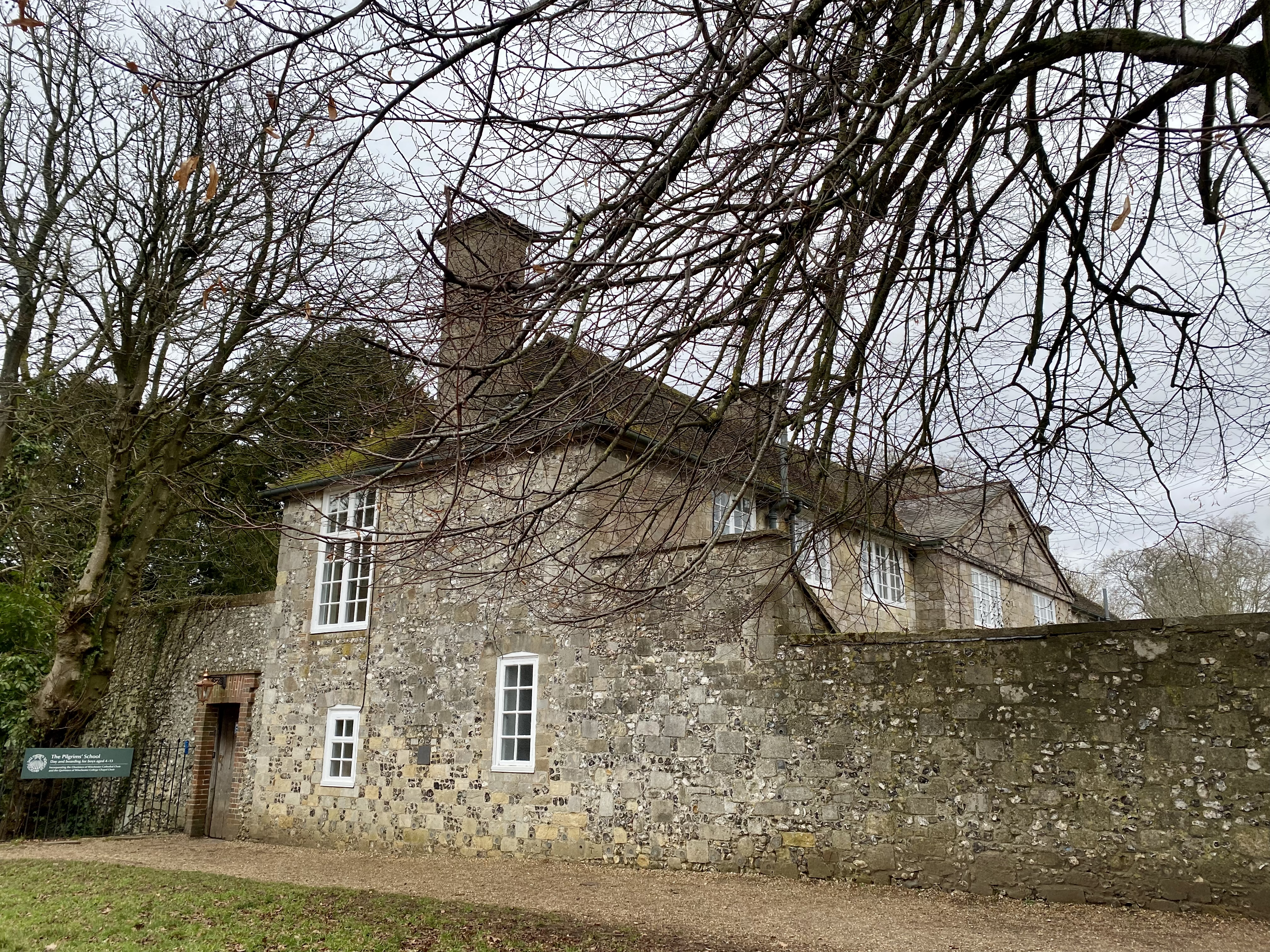
View of the stables from College Street. The infilled oculus is visible above the wall.

There are a set of stables to the south-west of the palace, which had been converted from a wool house under Jonathan Trelawny around 1710. Like the palace itself, the stables are two storeys high and are faced by reused ashlar. There are two coach-house doors, above which there is a pediment with an infilled oculus.
