= Bishop of Winchester =

Diocesan bishop in the Church of England

- Bishopric

anglican
- Arms of the Bishop of Winchester: Gules, two keys addorsed in bend the upper or the lower argent between them overlying the uppermost key a sword in bend sinister point upright of the third hilt and pommel or
- Incumbent; Philip Mounstephen

Location
- Ecclesiastical province: Canterbury
- Residence: Wolvesey Palace, Winchester

Information
- First holder: Wine
- Established: 634 (at Dorchester); 660 (translated to Winchester)
- Diocese: Winchester
- Cathedral: Winchester Cathedral (since 660); Dorchester (634–660)

The Bishop of Winchester is the diocesan bishop of the Diocese of Winchester in the Church of England. The bishop's seat (cathedra) is at Winchester Cathedral in Hampshire.

The Bishop of Winchester has always held ex officio the office of Prelate of the Most Noble Order of the Garter since its foundation in 1348. except during the period of the Commonwealth until the Restoration of the Monarchy. Bishops of Winchester also often held the positions of Lord Treasurer and Lord Chancellor ex officio.

During the Middle Ages, the Diocese of Winchester was one of the wealthiest English sees, and its bishops have included a number of politically prominent Englishmen, notably the 9th century Saint Swithun and medieval magnates including William of Wykeham and Henry of Blois.

The Bishop of Winchester is appointed by the Crown, and is one of five Church of England bishops who sit ex officio among the 26 Lords Spiritual in the House of Lords, regardless of their length of service. Philip Mounstephen has been the Bishop of Winchester since 10 October 2023.

The Diocese of Winchester is one of the oldest and most important in England. Originally it was the episcopal see of the kingdom of Wessex or the West Saxons, with its cathedra at Dorchester Cathedral near Oxford under Saints Birinus and Agilbert. The cathedral at Dorchester was founded in AD 634 by Birinius, a Roman missionary. The see was transferred to Winchester in AD 660.

Winchester was divided in AD 909, with Wiltshire and Berkshire transferring to the new See of Ramsbury. Nevertheless, the domains of the Bishop of Winchester ran from the south coast to the south bank of the River Thames at Southwark, where the bishop had one of his palaces, making it one of the largest as well as one of the richest sees in the land. In more modern times, the former extent of the Diocese of Winchester was reduced by the formation of a new diocese of Southwark in south London, (Note: The area was transferred to the Diocese of Rochester in 1877 before being established as a separate diocese in 1905.) a new diocese of Guildford in Surrey and a new diocese of Portsmouth in Hampshire. The most recent loss of territory was in 2022 when the Channel Islands were removed from the diocese of Winchester after a dispute with Bishop Tim Dakin led to a breakdown in relations. The Channel Islands were transferred to the Diocese of Salisbury by an Order in Council made under the Channel Islands Measure 2020.

Traditionally, in the general order of precedence before 1533, the Bishop of Winchester was given precedence over all other diocesan bishops - that is, the first English bishop in rank behind the archbishops of Canterbury and York. But in 1533, Henry VIII of England raised the rank of the Bishop of London and the Bishop of Durham, relegating Winchester to third (but still above other remaining diocesan bishops). The order of precedence was implicitly recognised by the Bishoprics Act 1878. (Note: The bishops are named in this order in the section.)

The Report of the Commissioners appointed by his Majesty to inquire into the Ecclesiastical Revenues of England and Wales (1835) found the Winchester see was the third wealthiest in England, after Canterbury and London, with an annual net income of £11,151.

The official residence of the Bishop of Winchester is Wolvesey Palace in Winchester. Historic homes of the bishops included Wolvesey Castle, Farnham Castle, Bishop's Waltham Palace and Winchester Palace in Southwark. The bishop is the visitor to five Oxford colleges, namely Magdalen College, New College, St John's College, Trinity College, and Corpus Christi College.

== Recent history ==
The former bishop of Winchester, Tim Dakin, was enthroned on 21 April 2012, having been elected on 14 October 2011. He was consecrated as a bishop at St Paul's Cathedral, London, on 25 January 2012. On 20 May 2021, it was reported that Dakin had "stepped back" as diocesan bishop for six weeks, in light of the threat of a diocesan synod motion of no confidence in his leadership. David Williams, Bishop of Basingstoke, also "stepped back" and Debbie Sellin, Bishop of Southampton, served as acting diocesan bishop. Dakin's leave was later extended to the end of August 2021. He retired on 6 February 2022.

Debbie Sellin continued as acting diocesan bishop during the vacancy, with retired bishop Richard Frith serving as the Archbishop's Episcopal Commissary in the diocese. In July 2023, it was announced that Philip Mounstephen would be the next Bishop of Winchester and that he was to leave his post at Truro in autumn 2023. Debbie Sellin remained acting diocesan bishop pending Mounstephen's election (which took place on 11 September) and confirmation on 10 October.

== List of bishops ==
=== Saxon to Norman ===
Bishops of Dorchester
From	Until	Incumbent	Notes
634	c. 650	Birinus	Sent from Rome by the pope, founded missionary diocese; Saint Birinius
c. 650	c. 660	Agilbert	Resigned.
Bishops of Winchester
From	Until	Incumbent	Notes
660	663	Wine	also had his See at Dorchester
670	before 676	Leuthere	
676	?705	Hædde	Canonized
c. 705	744	Daniel	
744	betw. 749–756	Hunfrith	
756	betw. 759–778	Cyneheard	
betw. 759–778	betw. 759–778	Æthelheard	
betw. 759–778	betw. 781–785	Ecgbald	
betw. 781–785	betw. 781–785	Dudd	
betw. 781–785	betw. 801–803	Cyneberht	
betw. 801–803	betw. 805–814	Ealhmund	
betw. 805–814	836	Wigthegn	
before 825	836	Herefrith	Never attests without Wigthegn.
betw. 833–838	838	Eadhun	
838 or 839	betw. 844–853	Helmstan	
852 or 853	betw. 862–865	Swithun	Canonized. Patron saint of Winchester.
betw. 862–867	betw. 871–877	Ealhferth	
betw. 871–877	878 or 879	Tunbeorht	
878 or 879	908	Denewulf	
909	932 or 933	Frithestan	Canonized
931	934	Beornstan	Canonized
934 or 935	951	Ælfheah (I)	
951	959	Ælfsige (I)	Translated to Canterbury
960	963	Beorhthelm	Possibly translated from Selsey
963	984	Æthelwold (I)	Canonized
984	1006	Ælfheah (II)	Translated to Canterbury. Canonized.
1006		Cenwulf	
1006	1012	Æthelwold (II)	
1012	1032	Ælfsige (II)	
1032	1047	Ælfwine	
1047	1070	Stigand	Translated from Elmham. Held Winchester with Canterbury 1052–1070.
Footnote(s): (Note: The second edition of the Handbook of British Chronology listed Eadmund to have been bishop of Winchester between 833 and 838, but in the third edition he is no longer listed to have been bishop.) and Source(s):

=== Norman to Reformation ===
From	Until	Incumbent	Notes
1070	1098	Walkelin	
1100	1129	William Giffard	
1129	1171	Henry of Blois	
1173	1188	Richard of Ilchester	
1189	1204	Godfrey de Luci	
1205		(Richard Poore)	Election quashed
1205	1238	Peter des Roches	
1238	1239	(Ralph Neville)	Election quashed
1240	1250	William de Raley	Translated from Norwich
1250	1260	Aymer de Valence	
1261	1262	(Andrew of London)	Election quashed
1261	1262	(William de Taunton)	Election quashed
1262	1268	John Gervais	
1268	1280	Nicholas of Ely	
1280		(Robert Burnell)	Election quashed June 1280.
1280	1282	(Richard de la More)	Never consecrated, resigned June 1282.
1282	1304	John of Pontoise	
1305	1316	Henry Woodlock	
1316	1319	John Sandale	
1319	1323	Rigaud of Assier	
1323	1333	John de Stratford	Translated to Canterbury
1333	1345	Adam Orleton	Translated from Worcester
1345	1366	William Edington	
1366	1404	William of Wykeham	Chancellor of England; founder of Winchester College and of New College, Oxford
1404	1447	Cardinal Henry Beaufort	Translated from Lincoln; Appointed Cardinal by Pope Martin V; The Bishop of Winchester in Shakespeare's First Part of Henry the Sixth
1447	1486	William Waynflete	
1487	1492	Peter Courtenay	Translated from Exeter
1493	1501	Thomas Langton	Translated from Salisbury
1501	1528	Richard Foxe	Translated from Durham
1529	1530	Cardinal Thomas Wolsey	Archbishop of York. Held in commendam the see of Winchester.

=== During the Reformation ===
From	Until	Incumbent	Notes
1531	1551	Stephen Gardiner (1st tenure)	
1551	1553	John Ponet	Translated from Rochester
1553	1555	Stephen Gardiner (2nd tenure)	
1556	1559	John White	Translated from Lincoln

=== Post-Reformation ===
From	Until	Incumbent	Notes
1560	1580	Robert Horne	
1580	1584	John Watson	
1584	1594	Thomas Cooper	Translated from Lincoln
1594	1595	William Wickham	Translated from Lincoln
1595	1596	William Day	
1597	1616	Thomas Bilson	Translated from Worcester
1616	1618	James Montague	Translated from Bath and Wells
1618	1626	Lancelot Andrewes	Translated from Ely
1627	1632	Richard Neile	Translated from Durham, later translated to York
1632	1646	Walter Curle	Translated from Bath and Wells. Deprived 1646, and died 1647.
1646	1660	The see was abolished during the Commonwealth and the Protectorate.	
1660	1662	Brian Duppa	Translated from Salisbury
1662	1684	George Morley	Translated from Worcester
1684	1706	Peter Mews	Translated from Bath and Wells
1707	1721	Sir Jonathan Trelawny	Translated from Exeter
1721	1723	Charles Trimnell	Translated from Norwich
1723	1734	Richard Willis	Translated from Salisbury
1734	1761	Benjamin Hoadly	Translated from Salisbury
1761	1781	John Thomas	Translated from Salisbury
1781	1820	Brownlow North	Translated from Worcester
1820	1827	Sir George Pretyman Tomline, Bt.	Translated from Lincoln
1827	1869	Charles Sumner	Translated from Llandaff
1869	1873	Samuel Wilberforce	Translated from Oxford
1873	1891	Harold Browne	Translated from Ely
1891	1895	Anthony Thorold	Translated from Rochester
1895	1903	Randall Davidson	Translated from Rochester, later translated to Canterbury
1903	1911	Herbert Edward Ryle	Translated from Exeter
1911	1923	Edward Talbot	Translated from Southwark
1923	1932	Theodore Woods	Translated from Peterborough
1932	1942	Cyril Garbett	Translated from Southwark, later translated to York
1942	1952	Mervyn Haigh	Translated from Coventry
1952	1961	Alwyn Williams	Translated from Durham
1961	1975	Falkner Allison	Translated from Chelmsford
1975	1985	John Taylor	
1985	1995	Colin James	Translated from Wakefield
1995	2011	Michael Scott-Joynt	Translated from Stafford
2012	2022	Tim Dakin	
2022	2023	Debbie Sellin, Bishop of Southampton and acting diocesan bishop	
2022	2023	Richard Frith, Archbishop's Episcopal Commissary	former Bishop of Hereford
2023	present	Philip Mounstephen	Translated from Truro; confirmed 10 October 2023.

== Assistant bishops ==
Among those who have served as assistant bishops of the diocese are:

- 1457–1486 (d.): William Westkarre, Prior of Mottisfont Abbey (1451–d.), titular Bishop of Sidon/Zeitun and Assistant Bishop of Canterbury (1480); sometime head of St Mary's College, Oxford (c. 1443); elected Prior of Holy Trinity Priory, Aldgate, 1445, but put aside; later a canon of Burscough Priory.
- 1885–1887 (res.): Francis Cramer-Roberts, Vicar of Milford-on-Sea and former Bishop of Nassau
- 1921–1922 (d.): James Macarthur, Archdeacon of the Isle of Wight (since 1906) and Assistant Bishop for the island; former Bishop of Southampton
- 1947–1962 (ret.): Leslie Lang, Archdeacon of Winchester and Canon Residentiary of Winchester Cathedral, and former Bishop of Woolwich
- 1963–1973 (ret.): Nigel Cornwall, Canon Residentiary of Winchester Cathedral and former Bishop of Borneo
- 1982–1990 (ret.): Hassan Dehqani-Tafti, former Bishop in Iran and President Bishop, Episcopal Church in Jerusalem and the Middle East
- 1996–2020 (d.) John Dennis, Honorary Assistant Bishop in the Diocese of Winchester and formerly Bishop of Knaresborough and Bishop of St Edmundsbury and Ipswich

== See also ==
- Deans of Winchester
- The Bishop of Winchester Academy

== Sources ==
=== Bibliography ===
- Fryde, E. B.; Greenway, D. E.; Porter, S.; Roy, I., eds. (1986). Handbook of British Chronology (3rd, reprinted 2003 ed.). Cambridge: Cambridge University Press. ISBN 0-521-56350-X.
- Greenway, D. E. (1971). "Bishops of Winchester". Fasti Ecclesiae Anglicanae 1066–1300: Volume 2: Monastic Cathedrals (Northern and Southern Provinces). British History Online.
- Jones, B. (1962). "Bishops of Winchester". Fasti Ecclesiae Anglicanae 1300–1541: Volume 4: Monastic Cathedrals (Southern Province). British History Online.
- Horn, J. M. (1974). "Bishops of Winchester". Fasti Ecclesiae Anglicanae 1541–1857: Volume 3: Canterbury, Rochester and Winchester Dioceses. British History Online.
- Powicke, F. Maurice; Fryde, E. B., eds. (1961). Handbook of British Chronology (2nd ed.). London: Offices of the Royal Historical Society.
