= Wolvesey Castle =

Grade I listed castle in England

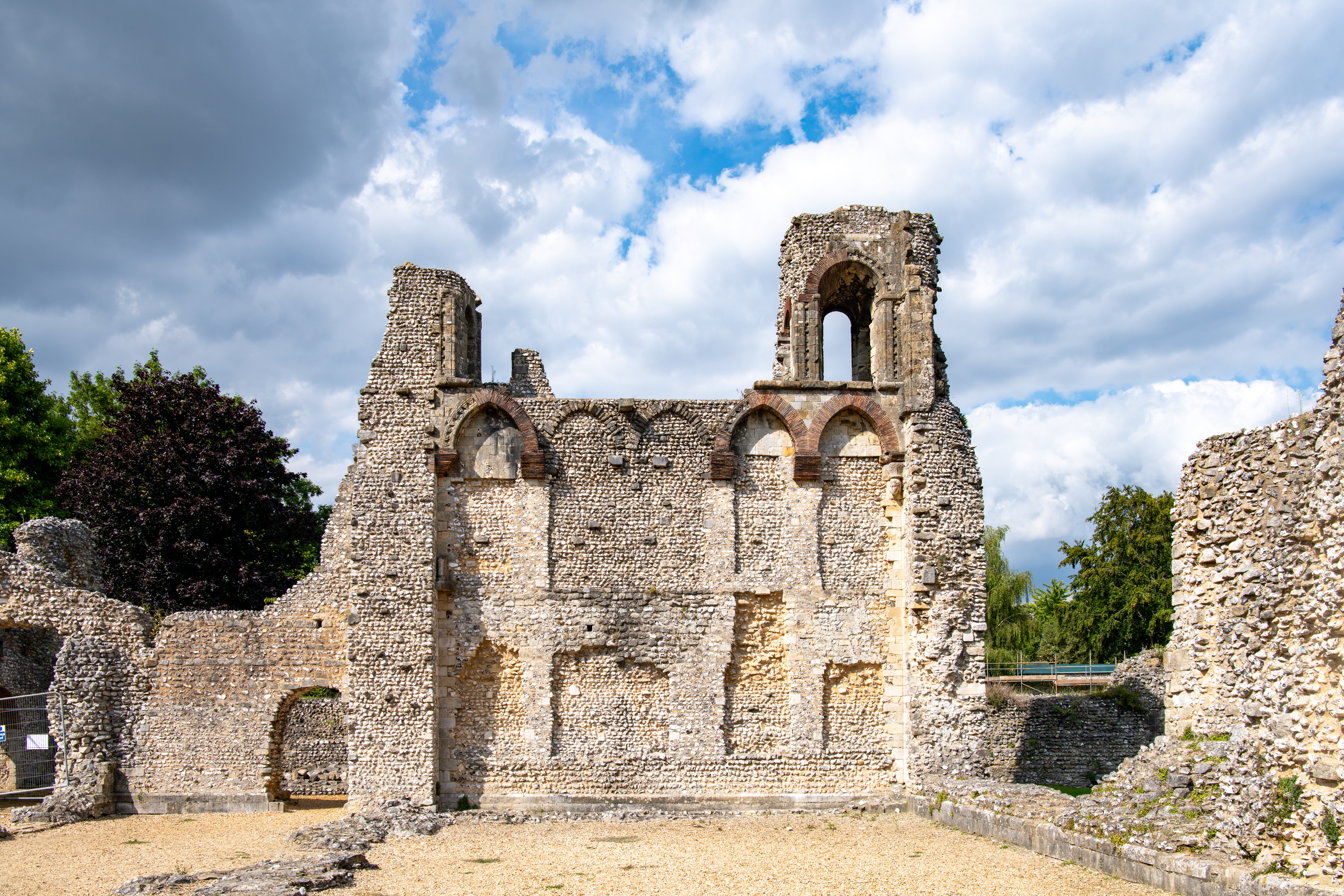
- Facade of the East Hall of Wolvesey Castle

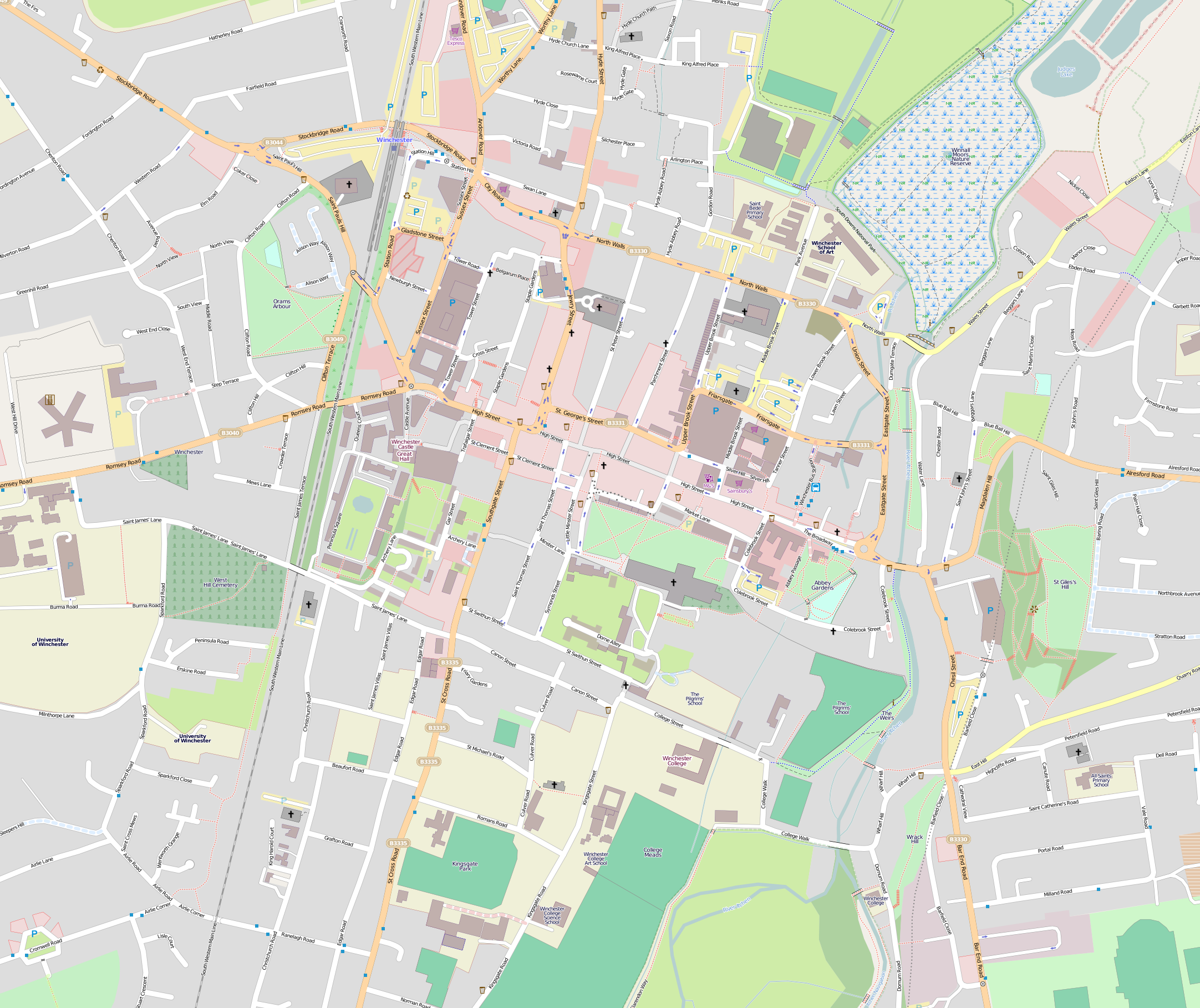
- Location within Central Winchester
- 51°03′33″N 1°18′36″W
- Location: Winchester
- OS grid reference: SU 48459 29088

Site notes
- Area: Hampshire
- Owner: English Heritage

Scheduled monument
- Official name: Wolvesey Palace
- Designated: 19 April 1915
- Reference no.: 1005535

Listed Building – Grade I
- Official name: Wolvesey Castle
- Designated: 24 March 1950
- Reference no.: 1095511

Wolvesey Castle, in Winchester, Hampshire, England, was the main residence of the Bishop of Winchester in the Middle Ages. The castle, mostly built by Henry of Blois in the 12th century, is now a ruin, except for its fifteenth-century chapel, which is now part of the bishop's current residence, Wolvesey Palace. Wolvesey Castle was primarily a palace, although Blois had it fortified because of the Anarchy.

== Early history ==
The site is an eyot in the River Itchen known as Wulveseye or Wulf's island. There were buildings there during the Roman period. The building before Wolvesey Castle was constructed around 970 by Æthelwold of Winchester, the Bishop of Winchester from 963 to 984, as his official residence or palace.

=== William Giffard ===
About 1110, the second Norman bishop, William Giffard, constructed a new hall to the south west.

=== Henry of Blois ===
Under Giffard's successor, Henry of Blois, brother of King Stephen, the palace was given a piped water supply which at the time of its rediscovery by archaeologists in the late 1960s was one of the earliest examples of a piped water supply in a medieval building in England. Henry of Blois also added a second hall to the west between 1135 and 1138.

Winchester came under siege during the Rout of Winchester in 1141 by the Empress Matilda during the period of civil war known as The Anarchy, and held out for three weeks until relieved by Henry's sister-in-law Queen Matilda. Subsequently Henry enlarged and fortified the palace by building a curtain wall, giving the palace the appearance of a castle.

== Later history ==
In June 1216, Oliver fitz Regis defended the buildings when they were besieged by Louis of France during the First Barons' War.

The palace was the location of the wedding breakfast in 1554 of Queen Mary I and King Philip. It was destroyed by the Roundheads during the English Civil War in 1646. The ruins are located next to the existing bishop's palace, and are currently owned and maintained by English Heritage.

== Today ==
The extensive surviving ruins are currently owned and maintained by English Heritage. The ruins have had Grade I listed status since 24 March 1950. A fair amount of the curtain wall remains, but nearly all the inner arrangements are gone, though it is possible to make out the hall, in which there is a good round arch and one surviving Norman window. The castle is near the city walls, parts of which still exist today.

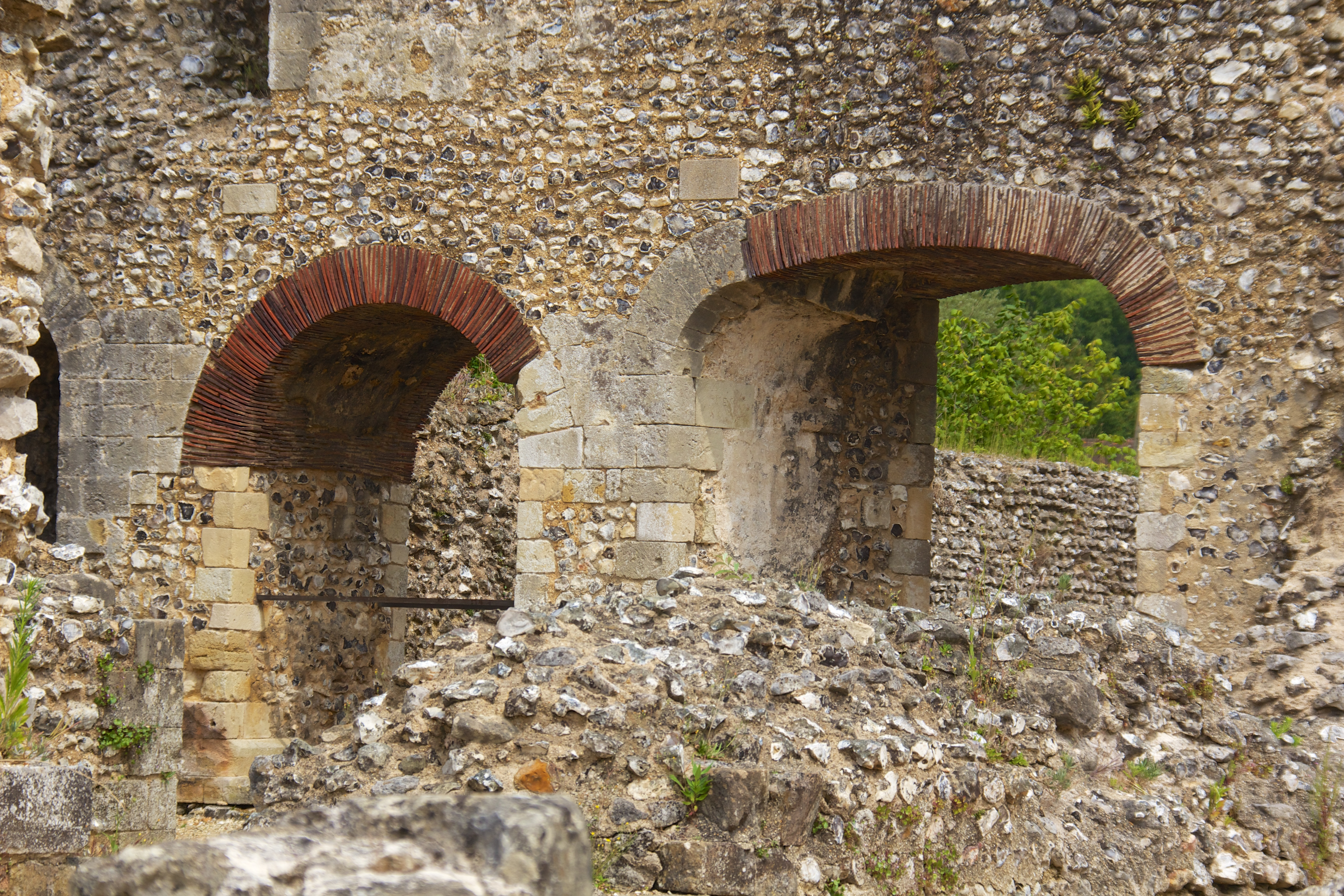
Archways

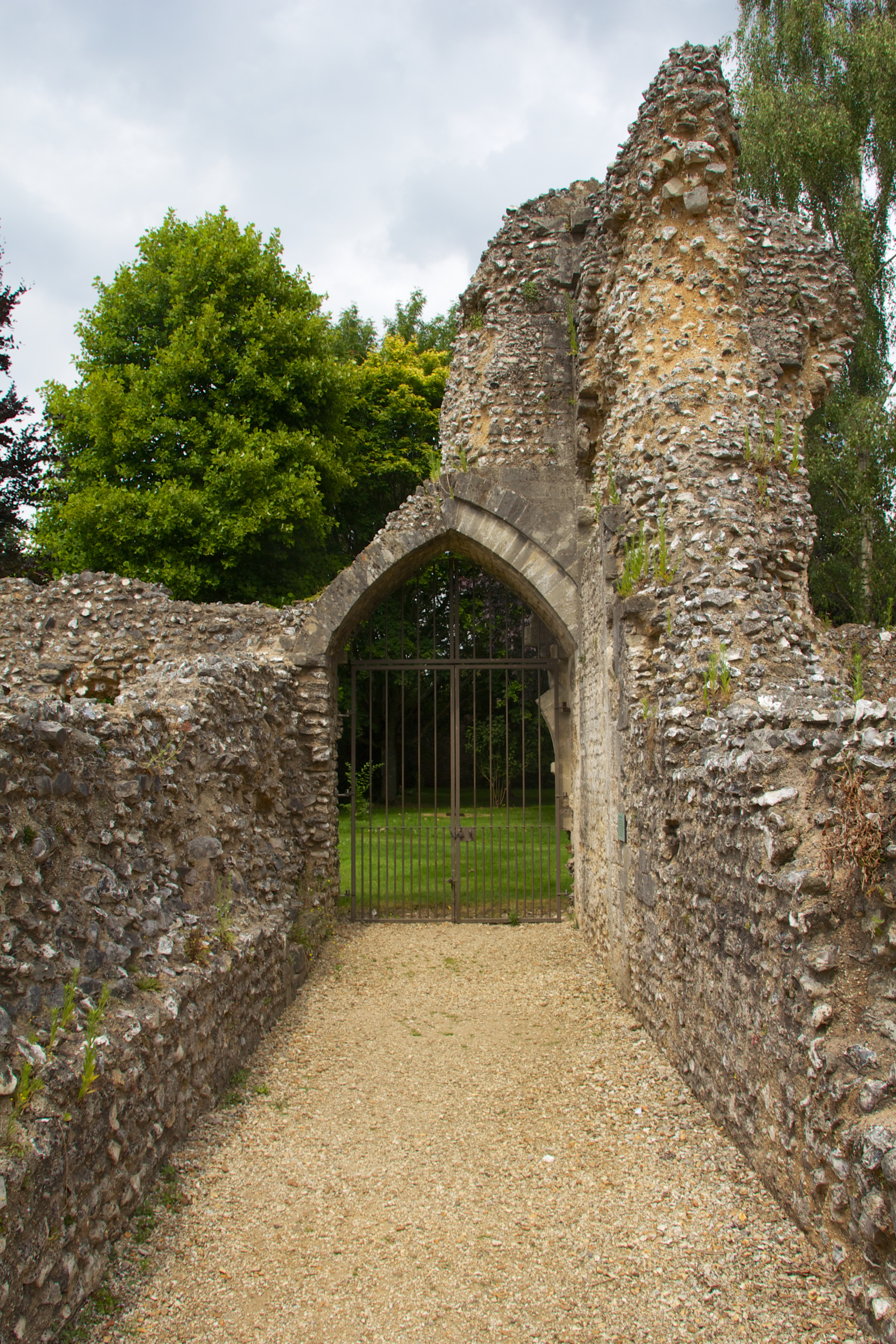
Woodman's Gate

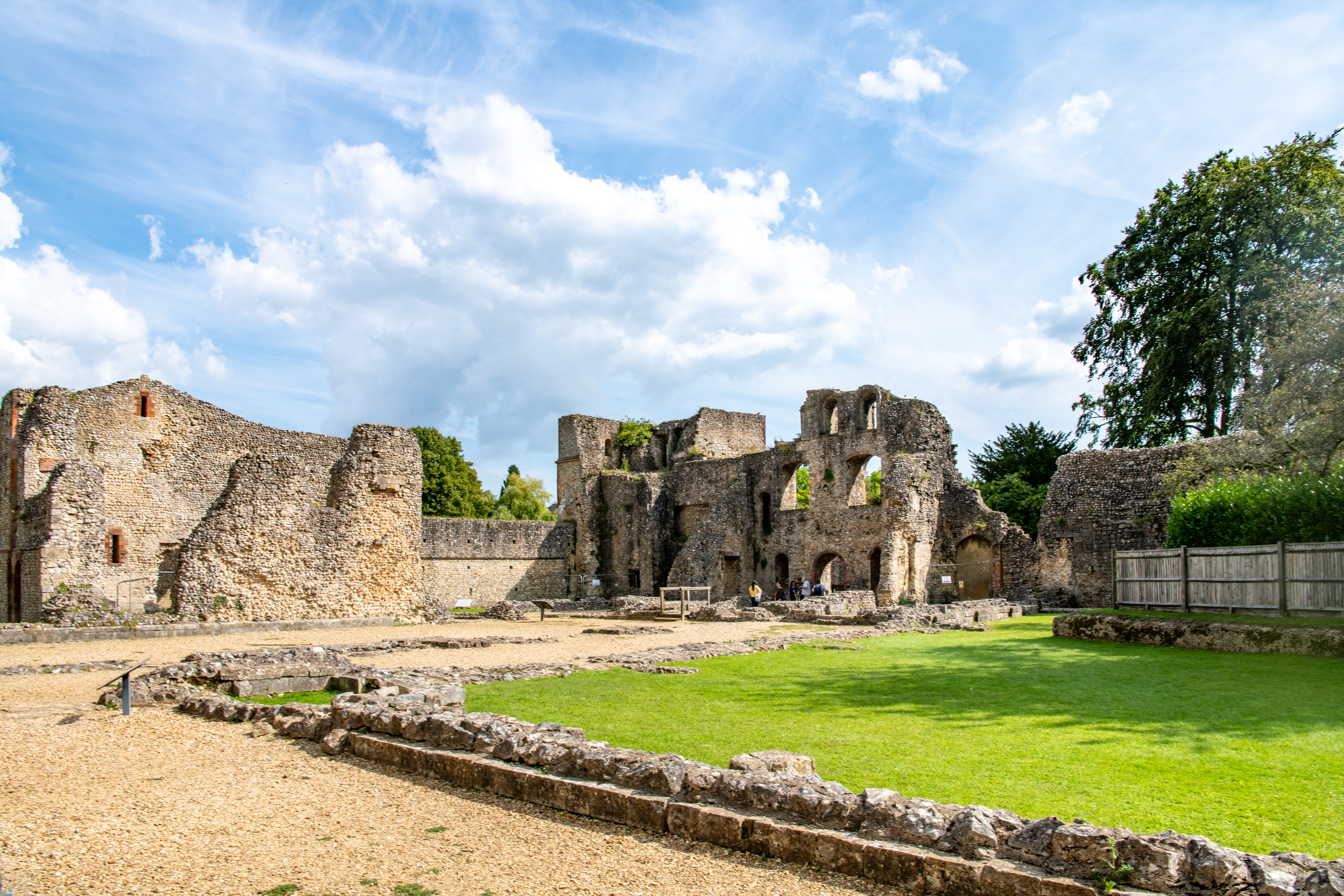
View of the south end of the East Hall

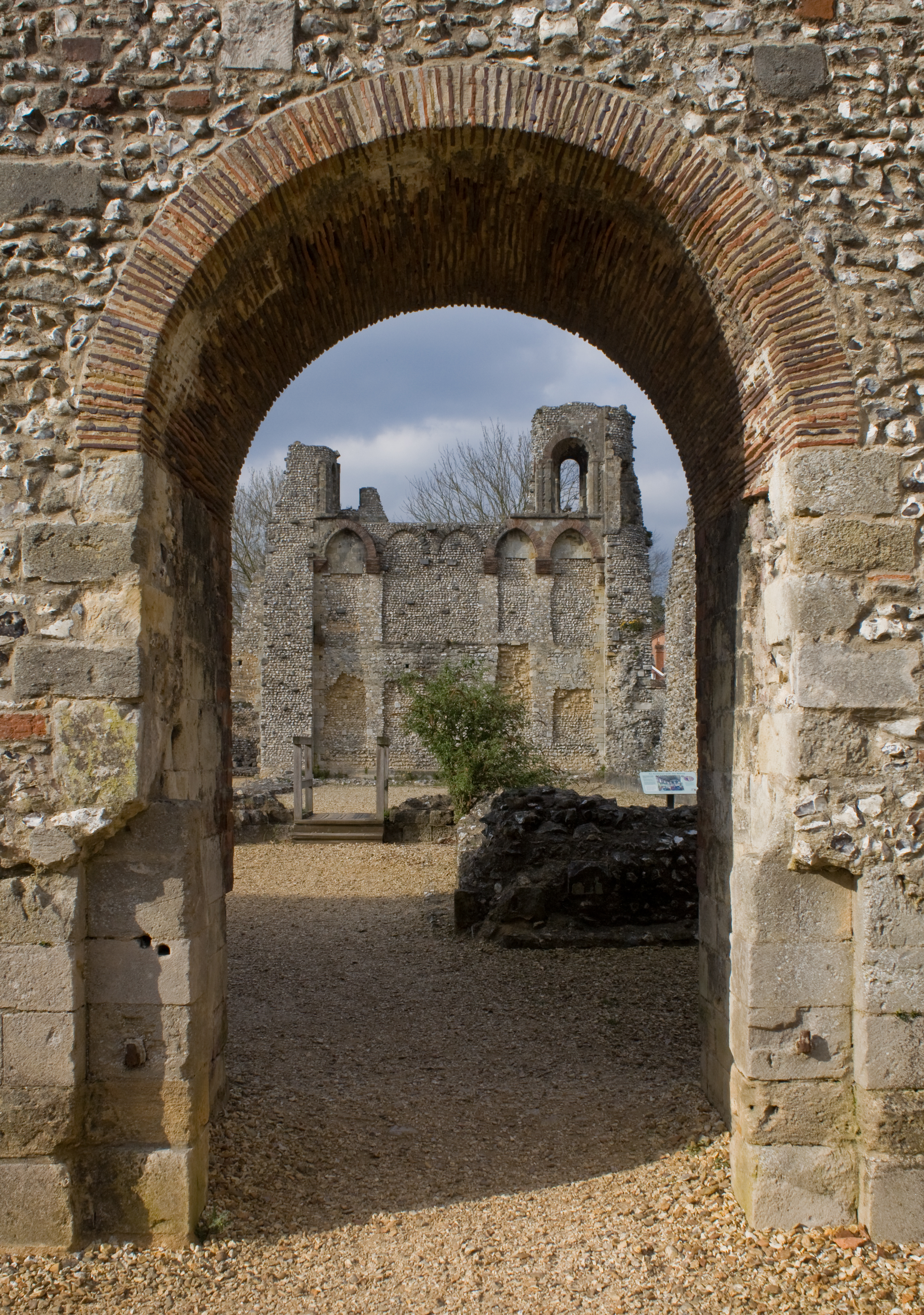
East Hall facade visible through an archway

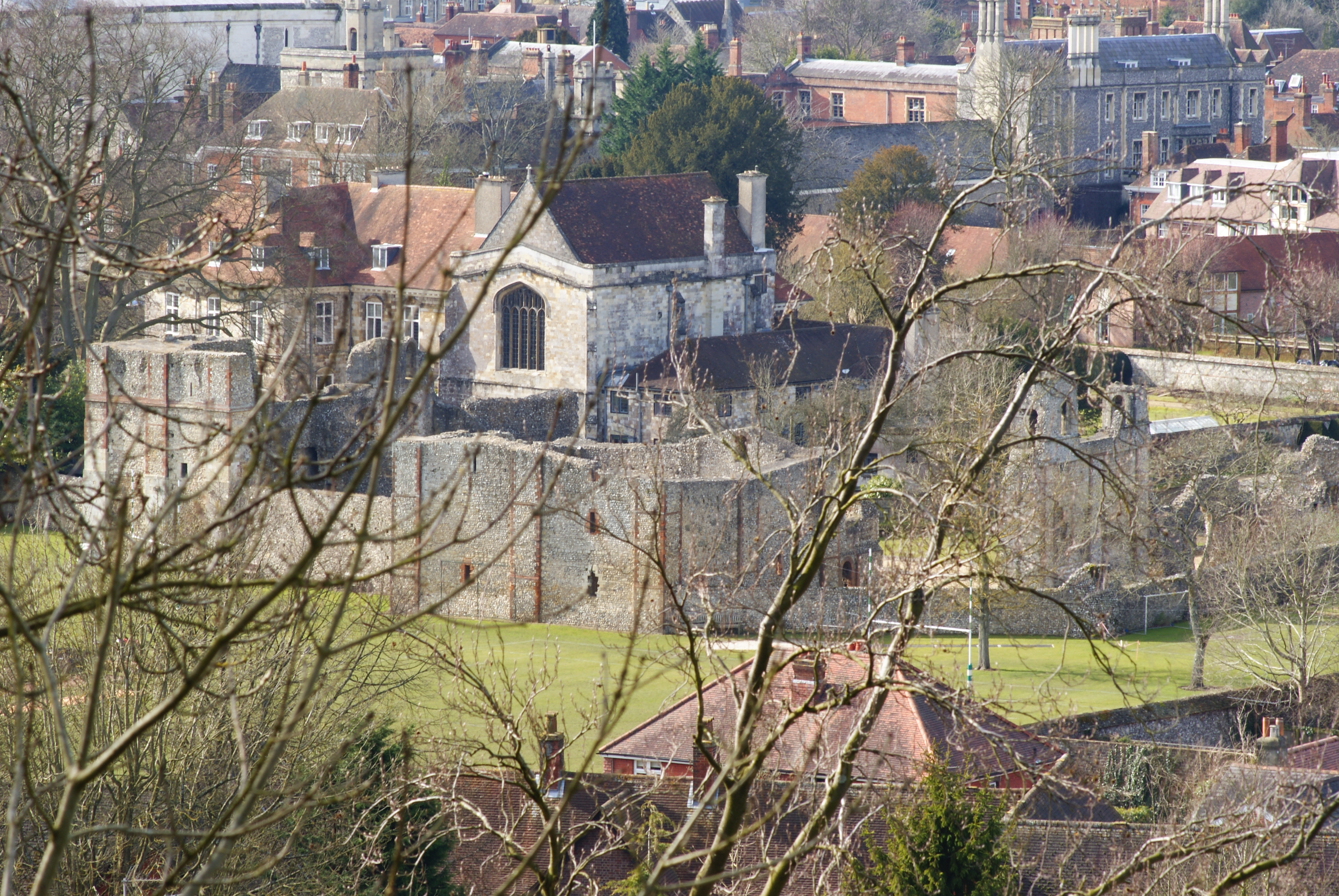
View of Wolvesey Castle from St Giles' Hill

== Baroque palace ==
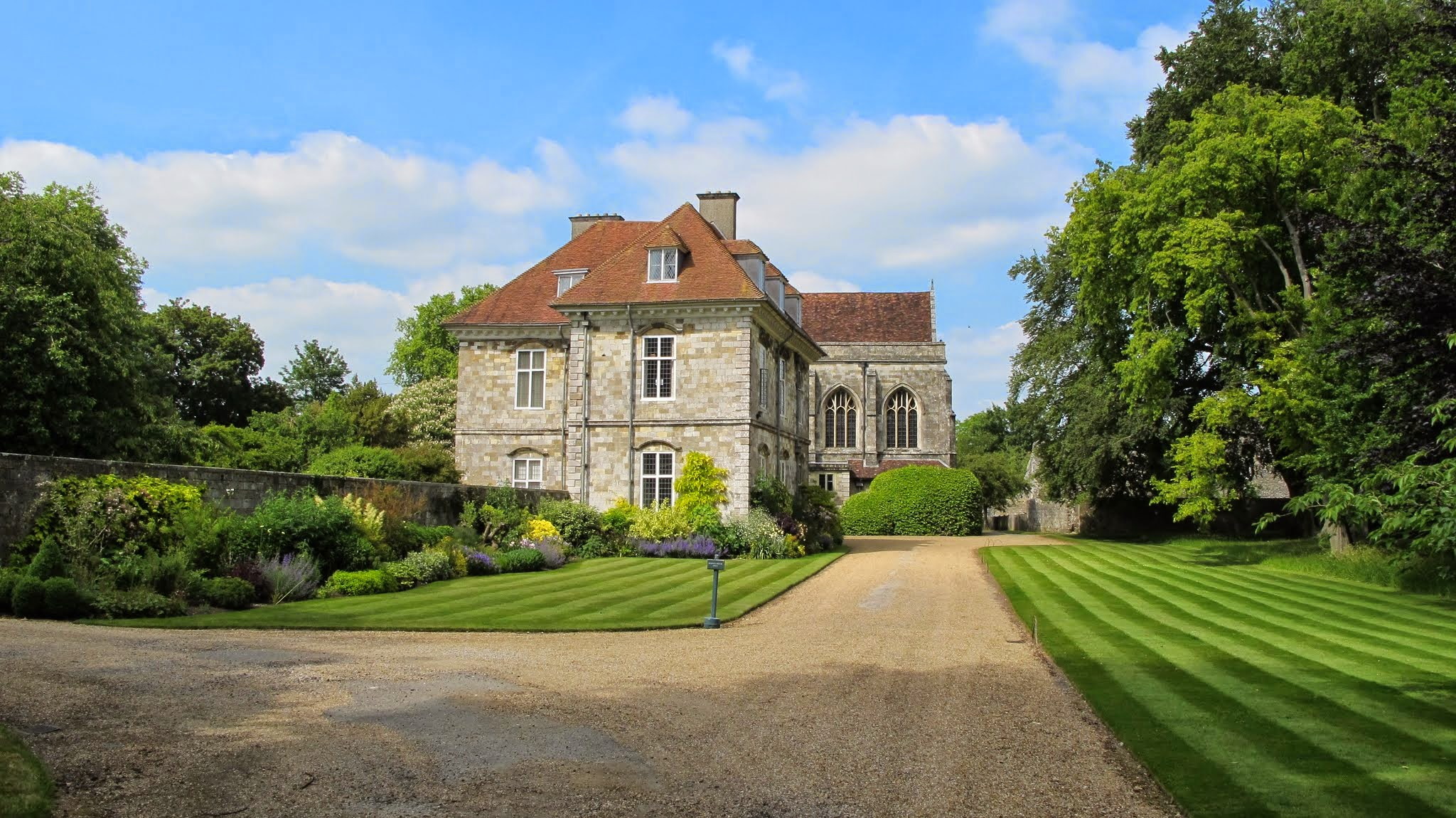
The surviving west wing of the baroque-style palace, 1684

A new palace in the baroque style was built to the south by Thomas Finch for George Morley in 1684. However, Brownlow North demolished all but the west wing of this palace in 1786. After a variety of different uses, the remaining part was refurbished for use once again as the bishop's residence in 1926 by Theodore Woods.

The chapel is the only considerable remnant of the south range of the medieval buildings, and is still in use, being attached to the palace.

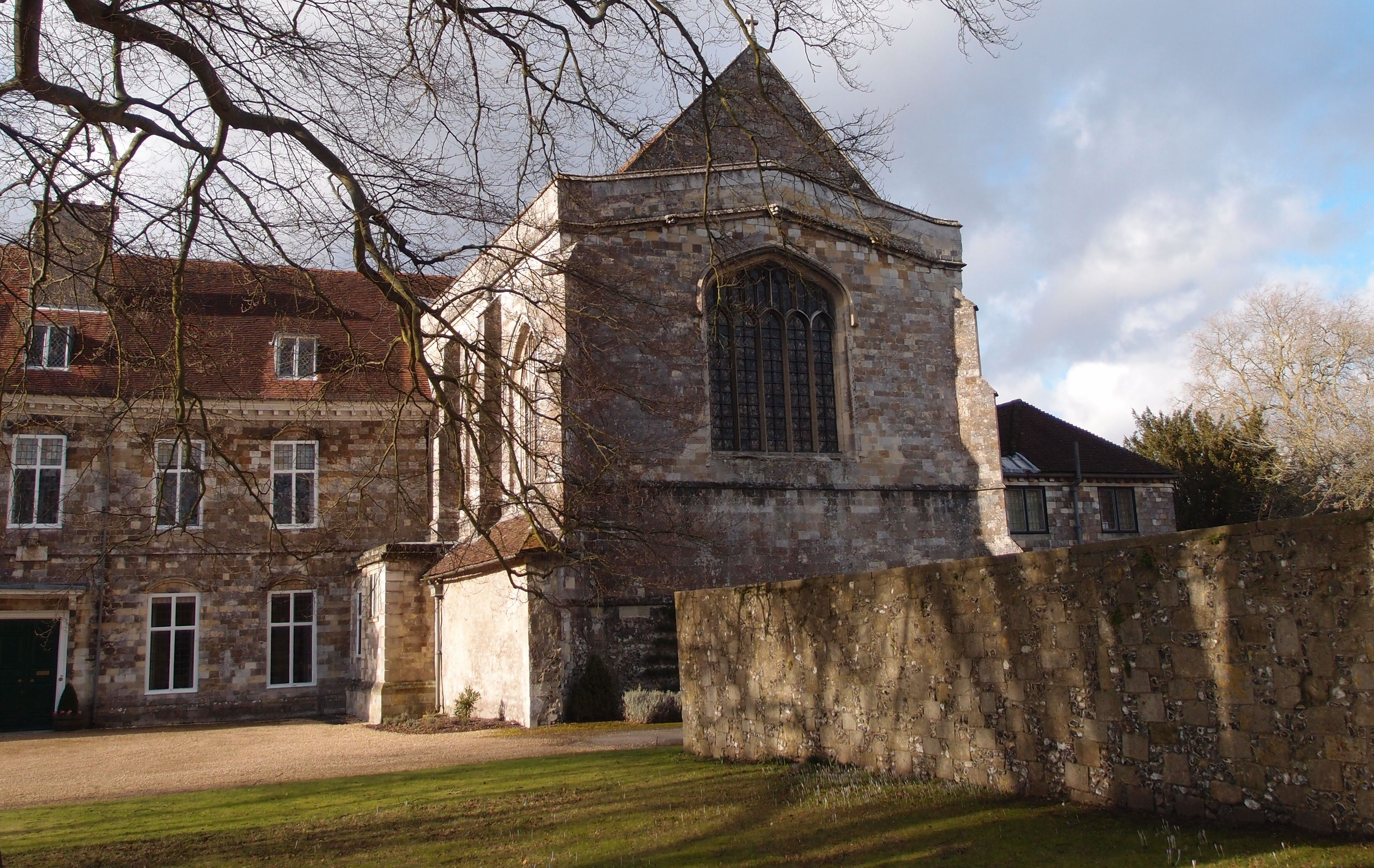
Wolvesey Palace Chapel

== See also ==
- Castles in Great Britain and Ireland
- List of castles in England
- Wedding of Mary I of England and Philip of Spain
