= Thelchildes =

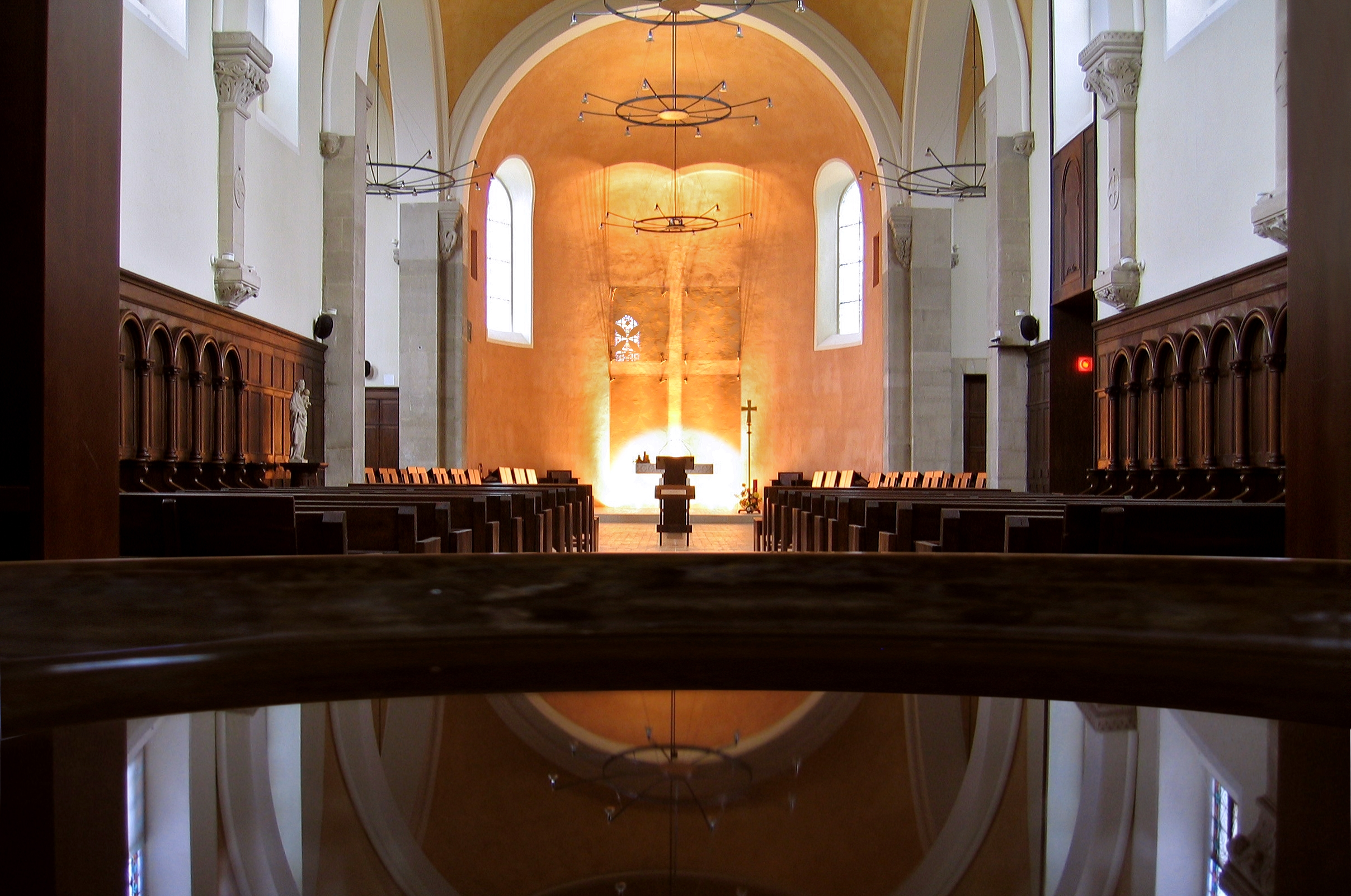
Jouarre Abbey church

Saint Thelchildis (died 660), was abbess of Jouarre Abbey.

Thelchildis was the daughter of a Neustrian noble named Betto. She was a first cousin of Audoin, Bishop of Rouen. Agilbert, Bishop of Paris, was her brother.

She seems to have been educated or first professed at the abbey of Faremoutiers.

She was mentor to Aetheria, first Abbess of Notre-Dame of Soissons (658), and of Berthild of Chelles. When Saint Bathildis, the wife of Clovis II, founded the Abbey of Chelles, she asked Saint Thelchildis to oversee the foundation, and to pick "the most experienced and virtuous nuns of Jouarre" to join her. She appointed Berthilde as first abbess, about 646.

She remained Abbess at Jouarre until her death in 660. Her fine sculpted sarcophagus can be seen there in the crypts, as can that of her brother.

Her successor, Agilberta, the second abbess of Jouarre was a kinswoman.
