= Berthild of Chelles =

Frankish abbesses (born 629–639, died 692)

Saint Berthild of Chelles
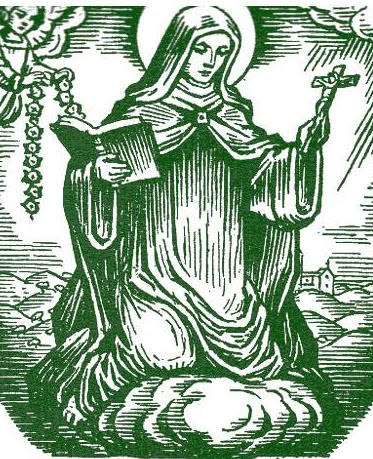

Abbess
- Born: c. 629–639; Soissons, France
- Died: 692; Chelles Abbey, France
- Venerated in: Roman Catholic Church; Eastern Orthodox Church
- Feast: 5 November; 26 May

Saint Berthild, also known as Bertille or Bertilla (died 692), was abbess of Chelles Abbey in France.

== Life ==
Berthild was born into one of the most illustrious families in the territory of Soissons, France, during the reign of Dagobert I.

She entered the nunnery of Jouarre in Brie, not far from Meaux, founded in 630 by Ado, the elder brother of Saint Ouen, who had taken the monastic habit there. Berthild was educated by Saint Thelchildis, the first abbess of Jouarre, who governed that abbey until 660.

When Saint Bathildis, the wife of Clovis II, founded the abbey of Chelles, which Saint Clotildis had first instituted near the Marne, she asked Saint Thelchildis to set up a new community there with the most experienced and virtuous nuns of Jouarre to direct the novices in the monastic order. Berthild was appointed first abbess of Chelles Abbey in 646.

Berthild was known for her devotion to self-denial. She "was ambitious of martyrdom, but as no persecutors were forthcoming, she martyred herself with austerities." She was admired as a teacher and important contemporaries came to Chelles for their education, including Dagobert III, Theuderic IV, and Saint Hereswith.

Saint Berthild's reputation drew several foreign princesses to the abbey. Among them was Queen Bathildis. After the death of her husband in 655, she was left regent of the kingdom during the minority of her son Clotaire III, but as soon as he was of age to govern in 665, she retired to Chelles Abbey. Saint Berthild died in 692 after governing the nunnery for forty-six years.

== Bibliography ==
- Butler, Alban (1866). The Lives of the Fathers, Martyrs, and Other Principal Saints. Compiled from Original Monuments and Authentic Records by the Rev. Alban Butler, in twelve volumes. Dublin: James Duffy.
