= August 10 (Eastern Orthodox liturgics) =

Day in the Eastern Orthodox liturgical calendar

Eastern Orthodox liturgical calendar
| August 9 | August 10 | August 11 |
August 10 O.S. ≍ August 23 N.S. August 10 N.S ≍ July 28 O.S.

An Eastern Orthodox cross

August 10 in Eastern Orthodox liturgical calendars is a feast day and a day of commemoration of saints and martyrs. Although some Orthodox churches use the Revised Julian Calendar and others use the traditional Julian calendar, the fixed commemorations for their respective August 10 are broadly the same, no matter which calendar is used. (Note: Despite the dates being the same, the days to which they refer typically differ by 13 days. The notation Old Style or O.S. is sometimes used to indicate a date in the traditional Julian Calendar (the "Old Calendar"). The notation New Style or N.S. indicates a date in the Revised Julian calendar (the "New Calendar").)

== Feasts ==
- Afterfeast of the Transfiguration of Our Lord, God, and Savior Jesus Christ. (Note: The hymns of Vespers remind us that the Transfiguration is not merely a historical event, but something which also has implications for us. Those who “desire to see and hear things past understanding” must ascend from earthly concerns to "the height of the contemplation of the virtues." This may be achieved by “directing our minds to heavenly things” and by "being formed anew in piety into the image of Christ.")

== Saints ==
- Holy Hieromartyrs Archdeacon Laurence, (Note: "AT Rome, on the Tiburtine road, the birthday of the blessed archdeacon Lawrence, a martyr during the persecution of Valerian. After much suffering from imprisonment, from scourging with whips set with iron or lead, from hot metal plates, he at last completed his martyrdom by being slowly consumed on an iron instrument made in the form of a gridiron. His body was buried by blessed Hippolytus and the priest Justin in the cemetery of Cyriaca, in the Veran field.") with Pope Sixtus II, (Note: Born in Athens in Greece, this Pope was martyred. While celebrating the liturgy in the catacomb of Praetextatus in Rome, he was arrested together with his deacons Felicissimus, Agapitus, Januarius, Magnus, Vincent and Stephen. All of them were martyred and later the seventh deacon St Laurence followed them.) and Hippolutus with Justin (258) (Note: Name days celebrated today include: Laurence (Λαυρέντιος); Laurencia (Λαυρεντία).)
- Deacons Felicissimus and Agapitus of Rome (258)
- Martyrs Romanus the Soldier and others, at Rome (258) (see also August 9)
- Saint Heron the Philosopher.
- Holy 6 martyrs of Bizin (or of Libya).

== Pre-Schism Western saints ==
- Holy 165 Martyrs of Rome, soldiers, martyred in Rome under Aurelian (274)
- Virgin-martyrs Bassa, Paula and Agathonica, in Carthage in North Africa.
- Saint Asteria (Hesteria), a martyr venerated in Bergamo in Lombardy in Italy (c. 307) (Note: he was a sister of St Grata and both were associated in the burial of the holy martyr Alexander.)
- Saint Gerontius (Geraint), a Briton who was King of Damnonia (Devon), now in England, he fell in battle against the pagan Saxons (508)
- Saint Blane (Blaan, Blain), a disciple of Sts Comgall and Canice in Ireland, he was a bishop in Scotland, was buried at Dunblane which was named after him (6th century)
- Saint Deusdedit (6th century) (Note: A poor shoemaker in Rome and a contemporary of St Gregory the Great, who relates that he gave away to the poor every Saturday all that he had earned at his trade during the week.)
- Saint Aredius (Arige, Aregius), an outstanding Archbishop of Lyon in France (c. 614)
- Saint Agilberta (Aguilberta, Gilberta), second Abbess of Jouarre Abbey (c. 680) (Note: Elected in about 660. She was a relative of St Ebrigisil, of St Ado, founder of Jouarre, and of St Agilbert, Bishop of Paris.)
- Saint Bertram (Bertelin, Bettelin, Beorhthelm), Wonderworker of Ilam & Stafford, England (8th century) (Note: "ST. BETTELIN, or BERTHELM, as he is sometimes called, was a disciple of St. Guthlac, and lived, as did several others, in a cell near Croyland. This kind of life he continued under Kenulph, the Saint's successor, and ended his days in great sanctity. It is conjectured that his relics, or a considerable portion of them, were translated to Stafford, before the destruction of Croyland by the Danes. However this may be, it was in Stafford and the neighbourhood that St. Bettelin was honoured with especial veneration." The base of his shrine still exists at Ilam. See also: September 9 (Eastern Orthodox liturgics).)
- Saint Thiento and Companions, Abbot of Wessobrunn in Bavaria in Germany, martyred with six of his monks by invading Hungarians (955)

== Post-Schism Orthodox saints ==
- Monk-martyr Jovan of Stjenica (sr) (1462) (Note: St. Jovan of Stjenica (c. 1382-1462) was a monk whose relics are kept in Stjenik Monastery on Mount Jelica, venerated for their healing powers, and who was executed by the Turks.)
- Blessed Laurence of Kaluga, Fool-for-Christ (1515)

=== New martyrs and confessors ===
- New Hieromartyr Vyacheslav Zakedsky, Priest (1918)
- New Hieromartyr Athanasius Kislov, Priest (1937)

== Other commemorations ==
- Second Uncovering and Translation of the relics of Venerable Sabbas of Storozhev or Zvenigorod (1998)
- Synaxis of New Martyrs and Confessors of Solovki.

== Icon gallery ==
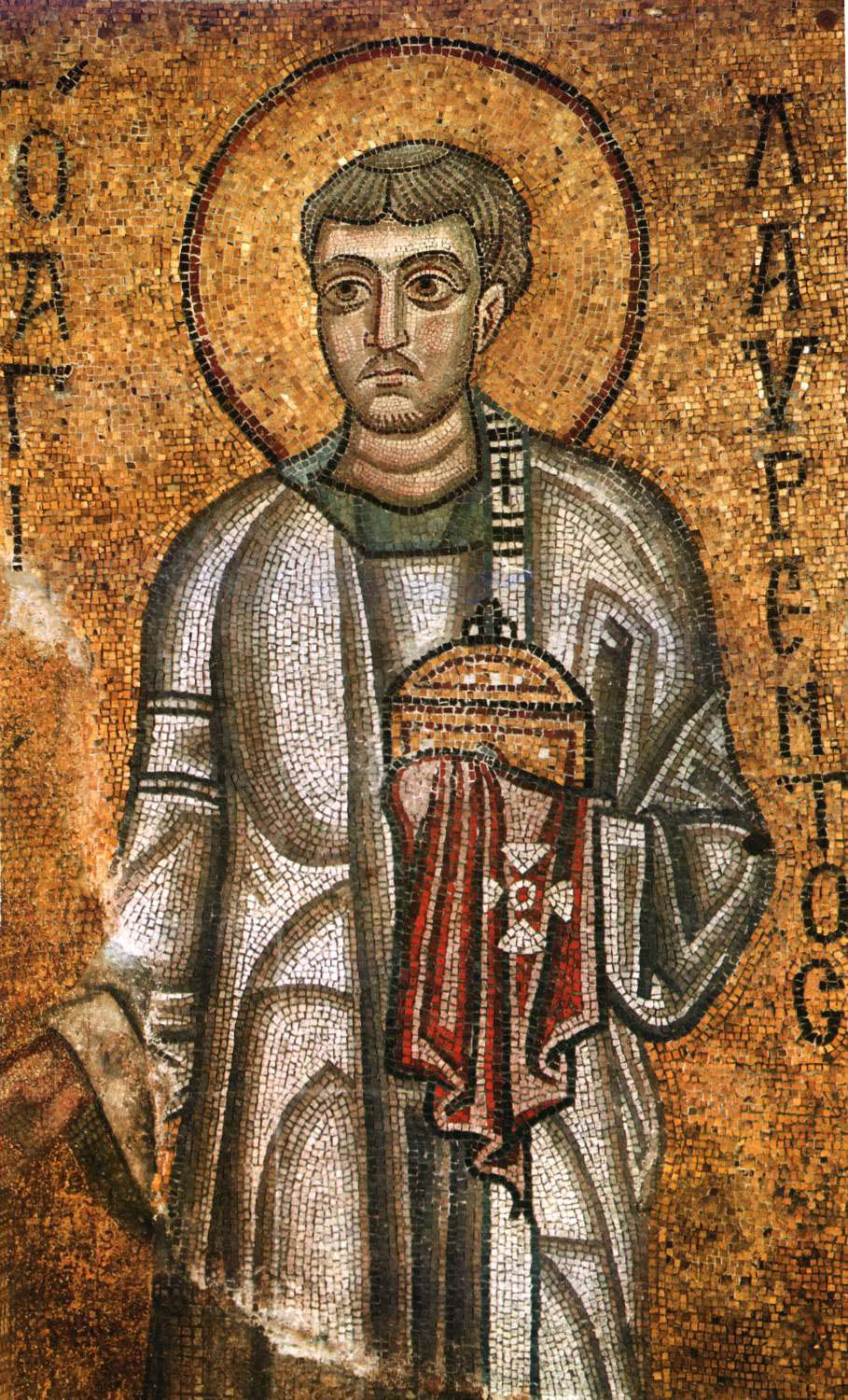
Holy Hieromartyr Archdeacon Laurence of Rome.

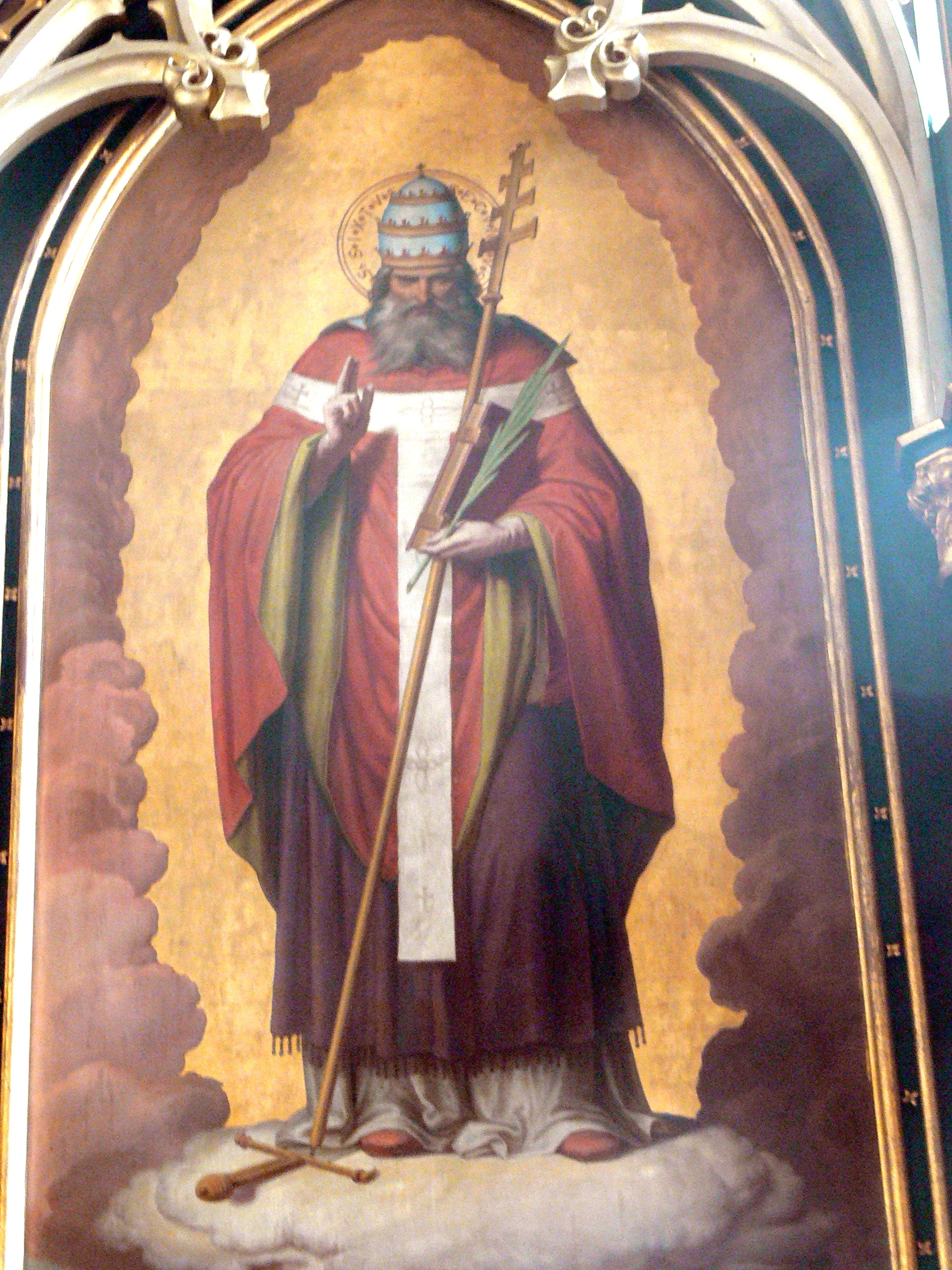
Pope Sixtus II.

== Sources ==
- August 23 / August 10. HOLY TRINITY RUSSIAN ORTHODOX CHURCH (A parish of the Patriarchate of Moscow).
- August 10. OCA - The Lives of the Saints.
- The Autonomous Orthodox Metropolia of Western Europe and the Americas (ROCOR). St. Hilarion Calendar of Saints for the year of our Lord 2004. St. Hilarion Press (Austin, TX). p. 59.
- Menologion: The Tenth Day of the Month of August. Orthodoxy in China.
- August 10. Latin Saints of the Orthodox Patriarchate of Rome.
- The Roman Martyrology. Transl. by the Archbishop of Baltimore. Last Edition, According to the Copy Printed at Rome in 1914. Revised Edition, with the Imprimatur of His Eminence Cardinal Gibbons. Baltimore: John Murphy Company, 1916. pp. 238-239.
- Rev. Richard Stanton. A Menology of England and Wales, or, Brief Memorials of the Ancient British and English Saints Arranged According to the Calendar, Together with the Martyrs of the 16th and 17th Centuries. London: Burns & Oates, 1892. p. 389.

Greek Sources

- Great Synaxaristes: (in Greek) 10 ΑΥΓΟΥΣΤΟΥ. ΜΕΓΑΣ ΣΥΝΑΞΑΡΙΣΤΗΣ.
- (in Greek) Συναξαριστής. 10 Αυγούστου. ECCLESIA.GR. (H ΕΚΚΛΗΣΙΑ ΤΗΣ ΕΛΛΑΔΟΣ).

Russian Sources

- (in Russian) 23 августа (10 августа). Православная Энциклопедия под редакцией Патриарха Московского и всея Руси Кирилла (электронная версия). (Orthodox Encyclopedia - Pravenc.ru).
