= Samvatsara =

Sanskrit term for a year

Today (at UTC+00)
- Sunday, 23 August 2026
- Hindu: Rāudra・5127 KY; Solar: 7 Bhādrapada, 1948 SE; Lunisolar: Ekādaśī, Śukla pakṣa of Śrāvaṇa, 2083 VE
Other calendars
Armenian	4 Hoṙi 1476
Aztec	Atemoztli 5, 5 Ācatl
Babylonian	9 Abu, 2337 SE
Balinese pawukon	Menga, Kajeng, Jaya, Paing, Urukung, Redite of Matal, Guru, Gigis, Sri
Bengali	8 Bhadro, BS 1433
Chinese	Yin Earth Snake・Room Mansion; 11 Qīyuè, Bǐngwǔnián (Chushu, 15 days until Bailu)
Common Era	23 August 2026 CE
Coptic	17 Mesori, AM 1742
Egyptian	9 Tybi, 2775 NE
Ethiopian	17 Naḥasē, 2018 Amätä Məhrät
French Republican	Décade I, Sextidi de Fructidor de l'Année 234 de la République
Gregorian	23 August, AD 2026
Hebrew	10 Elul, AM 5786
Icelandic	Sunnudagur, 29 Heyannir 2026
Islamic	9 Rabi' al-awwal, AH 1448 (using tabular method)
ISO week date	2026-W34-7
Japanese	11 Fumizuki, Reiwa 8 (Shosho, 15 days until Hakuro)
Julian	10 August, AD 2026 (AM 7534)
Julian day	2461276
Maya	13.0.13.15.13; 6 Mol, 5 Ben
Roman	ante diem IV Idus Augustas, MMDCCLXXIX AUC
Solar Hijri	1 Shahrivar, SH 1405

Samvatsara (संवत्सर) is a Sanskrit term for a "year" in Vedic literature such as the Rigveda and other ancient texts. In the medieval era literature, a samvatsara refers to the "Jovian year", that is a year based on the relative position of the planet Jupiter, while the solar year is called varsha. A jovian year is not equal to a solar year based on the relative position of Earth and Sun.

A samvatsara is defined in Indian calendars as the time Brihaspati (Jupiter) takes to transit from one sign of the Hindu zodiac (i.e. rashi) to the next relative to its mean motion. The ancient text Surya Siddhanta calculates a samvatsara to be about 361 days, marginally short of a solar year. Hence, one complete orbit of Jupiter through all the twelve signs of the zodiac will approximately equal twelve solar years. Five such orbits of Jupiter (i.e. 12 times 5 = 60 samvatsara) are referred to as a samvatsara chakra. Each samvatsara within this cycle has been given a name. Once all 60 samvatsara are over, the cycle starts over again.

This cycle of 60 samvatsara is based on the relative positions of Jupiter and Saturn in the sky. The orbital periods of Jupiter and Saturn are approximately 12 and 30 solar years respectively. The least common multiple of these two orbital periods is ~60 solar years. Every sixty years, both planets will be positioned at nearly the same sidereal coordinates where they started off sixty years before, thus forming a sixty year cycle.

== Omitted Samvatsaras ==
The ancient text Surya Siddhanta calculates the Jovian year to be about 361.026721 days or about 4.232 days shorter than the Earth-based solar year. This difference requires that about once every 85 solars years (~ 86 jovian years), one of the named samvatsara is expunged (skipped as a shadow year), to synchronize the two calendars.

This system of omission has fallen into disuse in South India. "There is evidence to show that the cycle of Jupiter was in use in Southern India before Saka 828 (A.D. 905-6); but from that year, according to the Arya Siddhanta, or from Saka 831 (A.D. 908-9) according to the Sürya-Siddhanta, the expunction of the samvatsaras was altogether neglected, with the result that the 60-year cycle in the south became luni-solar from that year."

== List of Samvatsaras ==
The sixty Samvatsaras are divided into 3 groups of 20 Samvatsaras each. The first 20 from Prabhava to Vyaya are assigned to Brahma. The next 20 from Sarvajit to Parabhava to Vishnu and the last 20 to Shiva.

Samvatsaras
Number	Name (IAST)	Name (Devanagari)	Name (Saurashtra)	Name (Tamil)	Name (Telugu)	Name (Kannada)	Current cycle (Vikram Samvat)	Current cycle (Gregorian)	Prior cycle 1	Prior cycle 2
1.	Prabhava	प्रभव	ꢦ꣄ꢬꢩꣃ	பிரபவ	ప్రభవ	ಪ್ರಭವ	2044	1987-1988 CE	1927-1928 CE	1867-1868 CE
2.	Vibhava	विभव	ꢮꢶꢩꣃ	விபவ	విభవ	ವಿಭವ	2045	1988-1989 CE	1928-1929 CE	1868-1869 CE
3.	Śukla	शुक्ल	ꢯꢸꢒ꣄ꢭꣁ	சுக்ல	శుక్ల	ಶುಕ್ಲ	2046	1989-1990 CE	1929-1930 CE	1869-1870 CE
4.	Pramodūta	प्रमोदूत	ꢦ꣄ꢬꢪꣂꢣꢹꢡꣁ	பிரமோதூத	ప్రమోదూత	ಪ್ರಮೋದೂತ	2047	1990-1991 CE	1930-1931 CE	1870-1871 CE
5.	Prajāpati	प्रजापति	ꢦ꣄ꢬꢙꢵꢦꢡꢶ	பிரஜாபதி	ప్రజాపతి	ಪ್ರಜಾಪತಿ	2048	1991-1992 CE	1931-1932 CE	1871-1872 CE
6.	Āṅgirasa	आङ्गिरस	ꢃꢖ꣄ꢔꢷꢬꢱꣁ	ஆங்கீரச	ఆంగీరస	ಅಂಗಿರಸ	2049	1992-1993 CE	1932-1933 CE	1872-1873 CE
7.	Śrīmukha	श्रीमुख	ꢯ꣄ꢬꢷꢪꢴꢸꢒ꣄ꢒꣁ	ஸ்ரீமுக	శ్రీముఖ	ಶ್ರೀಮುಖ	2050	1993-1994 CE	1933-1934 CE	1873-1874 CE
8.	Bhāva	भाव	ꢩꢵꢮꣁ	பவ	భావ	ಭಾವ	2051	1994-1995 CE	1934-1935 CE	1874-1875 CE
9.	Yuva	युव	ꢫꢸꢮꣁ	யுவ	యువ	ಯುವ	2052	1995-1996 CE	1935-1936 CE	1875-1876 CE
10.	Dhātṛ	धातृ	ꢤꢵꢡꢵ	தாத்ரு / தாதா	ధాతృ	ಧಾತೃ	2053	1996-1997 CE	1936-1937 CE	1876-1877 CE
11.	Īśvara	ईश्वर	ꢅꢯ꣄ꢮꢬꣁ	ஈஸ்வர	ఈశ్వర	ಈಶ್ವರ	2054	1997-1998 CE	1937-1938 CE	1877-1878 CE
12.	Bahudhānya	बहुधान्य	ꢩꣃꢤꢵꢥ꣄ꢫꣁ	பஹுதான்ய	బహుధాన్య	ಬಹುಧಾನ್ಯ	2055	1998-1999 CE	1938-1939 CE	1878-1879 CE
13.	Pramāthi	प्रमाथी	ꢦ꣄ꢬꢪꢵꢣꢶ	பிரமாதி	ప్రమాథి	ಪ್ರಮಾಥಿ	2056	1999-2000 CE	1939-1940 CE	1879-1880 CE
14.	Vikrama	विक्रम	ꢮꢶꢒ꣄ꢬꢪꣁ	விக்ரம	విక్రమ	ವಿಕ್ರಮ	2057	2000-2001 CE	1940-1941 CE	1880-1881 CE
15.	Vṛṣaprajā	वृषप्रजा	ꢮꢶꢰꢸ	விஷு / விருஷப்ரஜா	వృశప్రజా	ವೃಷಪ್ರಜಾ	2058	2001-2002 CE	1941-1942 CE	1881-1882 CE
16.	Citrabhānu	चित्रभानु	ꢗꢶꢡ꣄ꢬꢩꢵꢥꢸ	சித்திரபானு	చిత్రభాను	ಚಿತ್ರಭಾನು	2059	2002-2003 CE	1942-1943 CE	1882-1883 CE
17.	Svabhānu	स्वभानु	ꢱꣁꢩꢵꢥꢸ	சுவபானு	స్వభాను	ಸ್ವಭಾನು	2060	2003-2004 CE	1943-1944 CE	1883-1884 CE
18.	Tāraṇa	तारण	ꢡꢵꢬꢠꣁ	தாரண	తారణ	ತಾರಣ	2061	2004-2005 CE	1944-1945 CE	1884-1885 CE
19.	Pārthiva	पार्थिव	ꢧꢵꢬ꣄ꢡꢶꢮꣁ	பார்திவ	పార్థివ	ಪಾರ್ಥಿವ	2062	2005-2006 CE	1945-1946 CE	1885-1886 CE
20.	Avyaya/Vyaya	अव्यय/व्यय	ꢮꢾꢫꣁ	அவ்யய / வ்யய	వ్యయ	ವ್ಯಯ	2063	2006-2007 CE	1946-1947 CE	1886-1887 CE
21.	Sarvajit	सर्वजित्	ꢱꢬ꣄ꢮꢙꢶꢡꢸ	சர்வஜித்	సర్వజిత	ಸರ್ವಜಿತ್	2064	2007-2008 CE	1947-1948 CE	1887-1888 CE
22.	Sarvadhārī	सर्वधारी	ꢱꢬ꣄ꢮꢤꢵꢬꢶ	சர்வதாரி	సర్వధారి	ಸರ್ವಧಾರಿ	2065	2008-2009 CE	1948-1949 CE	1888-1889 CE
23.	Virodhī	विरोधी	ꢮ꣄ꢬꣂꢤꢶ	விரோதி	విరోధి	ವಿರೋಧಿ	2066	2009-2010 CE	1949-1950 CE	1889-1890 CE
24.	Vikṛti	विकृति	ꢮꢶꢒꢺꢡꢶ	விக்ருதி	వికృతి	ವಿಕೃತಿ	2067	2010-2011 CE	1950-1951 CE	1890-1891 CE
25.	Khara	खर	ꢓꢬꣁ	கர	ఖర	ಖರ	2068	2011-2012 CE	1951-1952 CE	1891-1892 CE
26.	Nandana	नन्दन	ꢥꢥ꣄ꢣꢥꣁ	நந்தன	నందన	ನಂದನ	2069	2012-2013 CE	1952-1953 CE	1892-1893 CE
27.	Vijaya	विजय	ꢮꢶꢙꢾꢫꣁ	விஜய	విజయ	ವಿಜಯ	2070	2013-2014 CE	1953-1954 CE	1893-1894 CE
28.	Jaya	जय	ꢙꢾꢫꣁ	ஜய	జయ	ಜಯ	2071	2014-2015 CE	1954-1955 CE	1894-1895 CE
29.	Manmatha	मन्मथ	ꢪꢥ꣄ꢪꢴꢡ꣄ꢡꣁ	மன்மத	మన్మధ	ಮನ್ಮಥ	2072	2015-2016 CE	1955-1956 CE	1895-1896 CE
30.	Durmukha	दुर्मुख	ꢣꢸꢬ꣄ꢪꢴꢸꢒ꣄ꢒꣁ	துற்முக	దుర్ముఖ	ದುರ್ಮುಖ	2073	2016-2017 CE	1956-1957 CE	1896-1897 CE
31.	Hevilambi	हेविळम्बि	ꢲꢾꢮ꣄ꢳꢪ꣄ꢨꢶ	ஹேவிளம்பி	హేవిళంబి	ಹೇವಿಳಂಬಿ	2074	2017-2018 CE	1957-1958 CE	1897-1898 CE
32.	Vilambi	विळम्बि	ꢮꢶꢳꢪ꣄ꢨꢶ	விளம்பி	విళంబి	ವಿಳಂಬಿ	2075	2018-2019 CE	1958-1959 CE	1898-1899 CE
33.	Vikāri	विकारि	ꢮꢶꢒꢵꢬꢶ	விகாரி	వికారి	ವಿಕಾರಿ	2076	2019-2020 CE	1959-1960 CE	1899-1900 CE
34.	Śārvarī	शार्वरी	ꢯꢵꢬꣁꢬꢶ	சார்வரி	శార్వరీ	ಶಾರ್ವರಿ	2077	2020-2021 CE	1960-1961 CE	1900-1901 CE
35.	Plava	प्लव	ꢦ꣄ꢭꣃ	பிளவ	ప్లవ	ಪ್ಲವ	2078	2021-2022 CE	1961-1962 CE	1901-1902 CE
36.	Śubhakṛt	शुभकृत्	ꢯꢸꢩꢒꢺꢡ꣄	சுபகிருது	శుభకృత	ಶುಭಕೃತ	2079	2022-2023 CE	1962-1963 CE	1902-1903 CE
37.	Śobhakṛt	शोभकृत्	ꢯꣂꢩꢒꢺꢡ꣄	சோபகிருது	శోభకృత	ಶೋಭಕೃತ	2080	2023-2024 CE	1963-1964 CE	1903-1904 CE
38.	Krodhī	क्रोधी	ꢒ꣄ꢬꣂꢤꢶ	குரோதி	క్రోధి	ಕ್ರೋಧಿ	2081	2024-2025 CE	1964-1965 CE	1904-1905 CE
39.	Viśvāvasu	विश्वावसु	ꢮꢶꢯ꣄ꢮꢵꢮ꣄ꢱꢸ	விசுவவாசு	విశ్వావసు	ವಿಶ್ವಾವಸು	2082	2025-2026 CE	1965-1966 CE	1905-1906 CE
40.	Parābhava	पराभव	ꢦ꣄ꢬꢵꢩꣃ	பராபவ	పరాభవ	ಪರಾಭವ	2083	2026-2027 CE	1966-1967 CE	1906-1907 CE
41.	Plavaṅga	प्लवङ्ग	ꢦ꣄ꢭꢮꢖ꣄ꢔꢸ	பிளவங்க	ప్లవంగ	ಪ್ಲವಂಗ	2084	2027-2028 CE	1967-1968 CE	1907-1908 CE
42.	Kīlaka	कीलक	ꢒꢷꢳꢒ꣄	கீலக	కీలక	ಕೀಲಕ	2085	2028-2029 CE	1968-1969 CE	1908-1909 CE
43.	Saumya	सौम्य	ꢱꣁꢪ꣄ꢪꢾ	சௌம்ய	సౌమ్య	ಸೌಮ್ಯ	2086	2029-2030 CE	1969-1970 CE	1909-1910 CE
44.	Sādhāraṇa	साधारण	ꢱꢤꢵꢬ꣄ꢠꣁ	சாதாரண	సాధారణ	ಸಾಧಾರಣ	2087	2030-2031 CE	1970-1971 CE	1910-1911 CE
45.	Virodhakṛta	विरोधकृत	ꢮ꣄ꢬꢴꣂꢣꢒꢺꢡ꣄	விரோதகிருத	విరోధకృత	ವಿರೋಧಿಕೃತ್	2088	2031-2032 CE	1971-1972 CE	1911-1912 CE
46.	Paridhāvi	परिधावी	ꢧꢬ꣄ꢣꢵꢮꢶ	பரிதாவி	పరిధావి	ಪರಿಧಾವಿ	2089	2032-2033 CE	1972-1973 CE	1912-1913 CE
47.	Pramādi	प्रमादी	ꢦ꣄ꢬꢪꢵꢣꢶ	பிரமாதீ	ప్రమాది	ಪ್ರಮಾದಿ	2090	2033-2034 CE	1973-1974 CE	1913-1914 CE
48.	Ānanda	आनंद	ꢃꢥꢥ꣄ꢣꢸ	ஆனந்த	ఆనంద	ಆನಂದ	2091	2034-2035 CE	1974-1975 CE	1914-1915 CE
49.	Rākṣasa	राक्षस	ꢬꢒ꣄‍ꢰꢱ꣄	ராட்சச	రాక్షస	ರಾಕ್ಷಸ	2092	2035-2036 CE	1975-1976 CE	1915-1916 CE
50.	Nala/Anala	नल/अनल	ꢂꢥꢭ꣄	நள	నల	ನಳ	2093	2036-2037 CE	1976-1977 CE	1916-1917 CE
51.	Piṅgala	पिंगल	ꢦꢶꢖ꣄ꢔ꣄ꢳꣁ	பிங்கள	పింగళ	ಪಿಂಗಳ	2094	2037-2038 CE	1977-1978 CE	1917-1918 CE
52.	Kālayukta	कालयुक्त	ꢒꢭꢫꢸꢡ꣄ꢡꣁ	காளயுக்தி	కాళయుక్త	ಕಾಳಯುಕ್ತಿ	2095	2038-2039 CE	1978-1979 CE	1918-1919 CE
53.	Siddhārthi	सिद्धार्थी	ꢱꢶꢣ꣄ꢤꢵꢬ꣄ꢡꢶ	சித்தார்த்தி	సిద్ధార్థీ	ಸಿದ್ಧಾರ್ಥಿ	2096	2039-2040 CE	1979-1980 CE	1919-1920 CE
54.	Raudri	रौद्र	ꢬꣁꢣ꣄ꢬꢶ	ரௌத்ரி	రౌద్రి	ರೌದ್ರಿ	2097	2040-2041 CE	1980-1981 CE	1920-1921 CE
55.	Durmati	दुर्मति	ꢣꢸꢬ꣄ꢪꢡꢶ	துற்மதி	దుర్మతి	ದುರ್ಮತಿ	2098	2041-2042 CE	1981-1982 CE	1921-1922 CE
56.	Dundubhi	दुन्दुभी	ꢤꢸꢥ꣄ꢣꢸꢨꢶ	துந்துபி	దుందుభీ	ದುಂದುಭಿ	2099	2042-2043 CE	1982-1983 CE	1922-1923 CE
57.	Rudhirodgāri	रूधिरोद्गारी	ꢬꢴꢸꢣꢶꢬꣁꢣ꣄ꢔꢵꢬꢶ	ருதிரோத்காரி	రుధిరోద్గారి	ರುಧಿರೋದ್ಗಾರಿ	2100	2043-2044 CE	1983-1984 CE	1923-1924 CE
58.	Raktākṣi	रक्ताक्षि	રક્તાક્ષી	ரக்தாட்சி	రక్తాక్షి	ರಕ್ತಾಕ್ಷಿ	2101	2044-2045 CE	1984-1985 CE	1924-1925 CE
59.	Krodhana/Manyu	क्रोधन	ꢓ꣄ꢬꣂꢣꢥ꣄	குரோதன	క్రోధన	ಕ್ರೋಧನ	2102	2045-2046 CE	1985-1986 CE	1925-1926 CE
60.	Akshaya	अक्षय	ꢂꢒ꣄‍ꢰꢾꢮ꣄	அட்சய	అక్షయ	ಅಕ್ಷಯ	2103	2046-2047 CE	1986-1987 CE	1926-1927 CE

== See also ==
- Hindu Calendar
- Panchangam
- the Chinese sexagenary cycle

== Sources ==
- Robert Sewell; Śaṅkara Bālakr̥shṇa Dīkshita; Robert Schram (1995). The Indian Calendar, with Tables for the Conversion of Hindu and Muhammadan Into A.D. Dates, and Vice Versa. Motilal Banarsidass. pp. 34–. ISBN 978-81-208-1207-9.
