= Balda of Jouarre =

French abbess and Catholic saint

Saint Balda of Jouarre
- Venerated in: Catholic Church
- Major shrine: Jouarre Abbey
- Feast: December 9

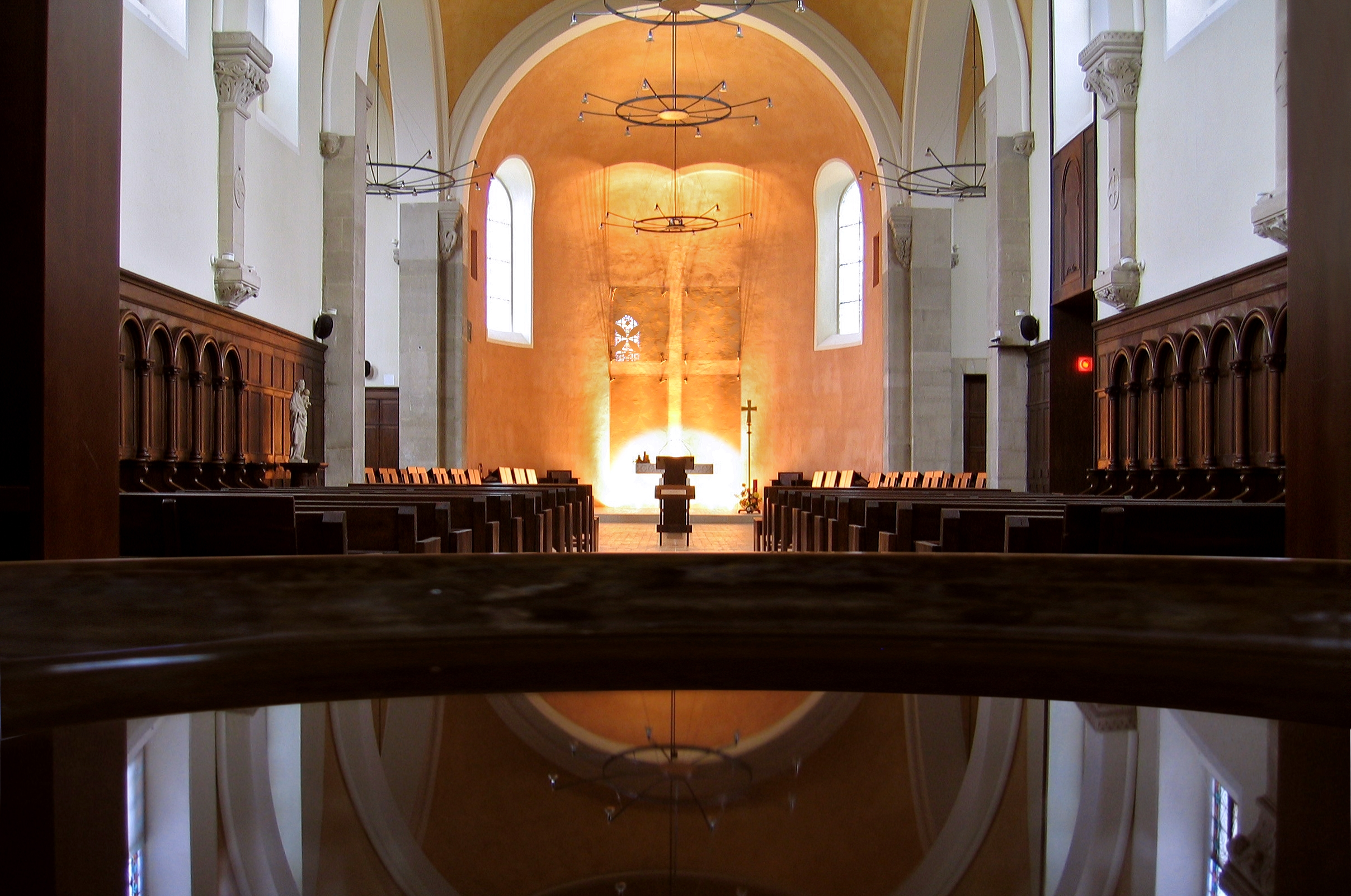
Jouarre Abbey church

Balda of Jouarre was the third abbess at Jouarre Abbey in north-central France. She was a nun at Jourarre for many years, under her nieces Theodichildis and Agilberta, who were abbesses before her. Her nephew, Agilbert, was bishop of Paris. She might have been related to Sadalberga.

She succeeded Agilberta in about 680, and "died at a great age in the odour of sanctity". She is buried in the crypt at Jouarre in one of three well-preserved sarcophagi. Her feast day is December 9.
