= August 9 (Eastern Orthodox liturgics) =

Day in the Eastern Orthodox liturgical calendar

Eastern Orthodox liturgical calendar
August 8	August 9	August 10
August 9 O.S. ≍ August 22 N.S. August 9 N.S ≍ July 27 O.S.

An Eastern Orthodox cross

August 9 in Eastern Orthodox liturgical calendars is a feast day and a day of commemoration of saints and martyrs. Although some Orthodox churches use the Revised Julian Calendar and others use the traditional Julian calendar, the fixed commemorations for their respective August 9 are broadly the same, no matter which calendar is used. (Note: Despite the dates being the same, the days to which they refer typically differ by 13 days. The notation Old Style or O.S. is sometimes used to indicate a date in the traditional Julian Calendar (the "Old Calendar"). The notation New Style or N.S. indicates a date in the Revised Julian calendar (the "New Calendar").)

== Feasts ==
- Afterfeast of the Transfiguration of Our Lord, God, and Savior Jesus Christ. (Note: The Church’s hymns today invite us to “ascend the holy mountain” and “with the eyes of faith,” to “behold the radiant Transfiguration of the Lord.” Christ has transformed our fallen human nature and restored its original beauty “by the burning radiance of His divinity.”)

== Saints ==
- Holy Apostle Matthias (1st century)
- Martyr Anthony of Alexandria (2nd century)
- Venerable Psoes of Egypt (Psoy) (4th century)
- Saint Samuel of Edessa, presbyter (5-6th century)
- Saint Constantine I, Patriarch of Constantinople (677) (see also: July 29)
- The Holy Ten Martyrs of Halki, who defended the wonderworking icon of the Savior, made of copper:

- Martyrs Julian, Marcian, John, James (Jacob), Alexius, Demetrius, Photius, Peter, Leontius, Mary the Patrician, Gregory the protospatharios, two boys and others, of Constantinople (730)

- Saint Irene of Athens, Byzantine empress regnant and a strong iconodule (803) (see also: August 7)

== Pre-Schism Western saints ==
- Saints Secundian, Marcellian and Verian, martyrs who suffered near Civitavecchia in Italy under Decius (250)
- Saint Numidicus and Companions, a group of martyrs burnt at the stake at Carthage in North Africa under Decius (251)
- Saint Romanus Ostiarius, an early martyr in Rome (258) (see also: August 10)
- Saints Firmus and Rusticus, two relatives, probably citizens of Bergamo in the north of Italy, honoured in Verona under Maximian (c. 290)
- Saint Amor (Amour), venerated in Franche-Comté in France together with St Viator.
- Saint Domitian of Châlons, third Bishop of Châlons-sur-Marne in France, Confessor (4th century)
- Saint Rusticus, a martyr at Sirmium in Pannonia (4th century)
- Saint Autor (Adinctor, Auteur), the thirteenth Bishop of Metz in France (5th century)
- Saint Bandaridus (Banderik, Bandery), Bishop of Soissons in France from 540 to 566 and founder of a monastery at Crépin (566)
- Saint Phelim, a disciple of St Columba (6th century)
- Saint Serenus, Bishop of Marseilles in France (606)
- Saint Nathy (Nath Í of Achonry, David), disciple of St Finian of Clonard (c. 610)

== Post-Schism Orthodox saints ==
- Hieromartyr Euthymius of Rhodes (1529)
- Saint Macarius, founder of Oredezh Monastery (Novgorod) (1532)
- Saint Philaret (Gumilevsky), Archbishop of Chernigov (1866)
- Saint Alexis Medvedkov, Archpriest, of Ugine, France (1934) (see also: August 2)
- Saint Anthony (Nozdrin), schiarchimandrite of Balta (1960)
- Saint Severian (Beridze), deacon, confessor of Adjara (1996)

=== New martyrs and confessors ===
- New Martyr Abbess Margaret (Gunaronulo) of Menzelino (1918) (see also: January 25 / February 7)
- Holy New Martyr Ignatius (Bazyluk), at St Onuphrios Monastery in Jabłeczna (1942) (see also: July 28)

== Other commemorations ==
- Icon of the Savior "Not-Made-by-Hands" of Camuliana in Cappadocia (Image of Camuliana), an acheiropoieton (ca. 303)
- The Restoration of the Temple of the 40 Martyrs of Sebaste, in Constantinople.
- Synaxis of the Saints of Solovki.
- Canonization of Venerable Herman of Alaska, Wonderworker of America.

== Icon gallery ==
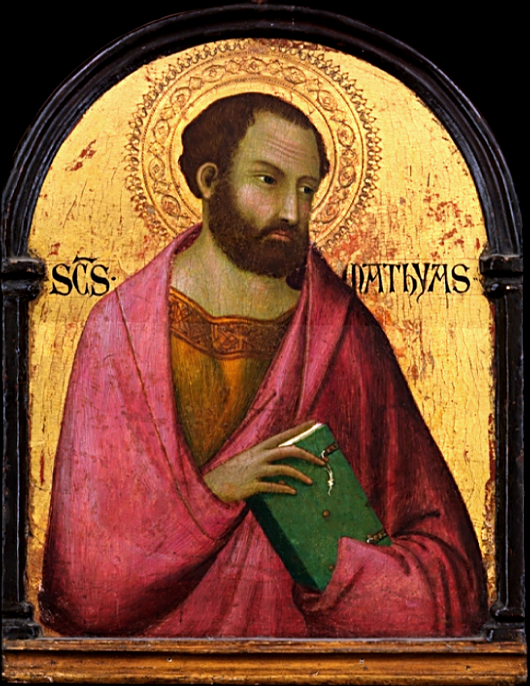
Holy Apostle Matthias.

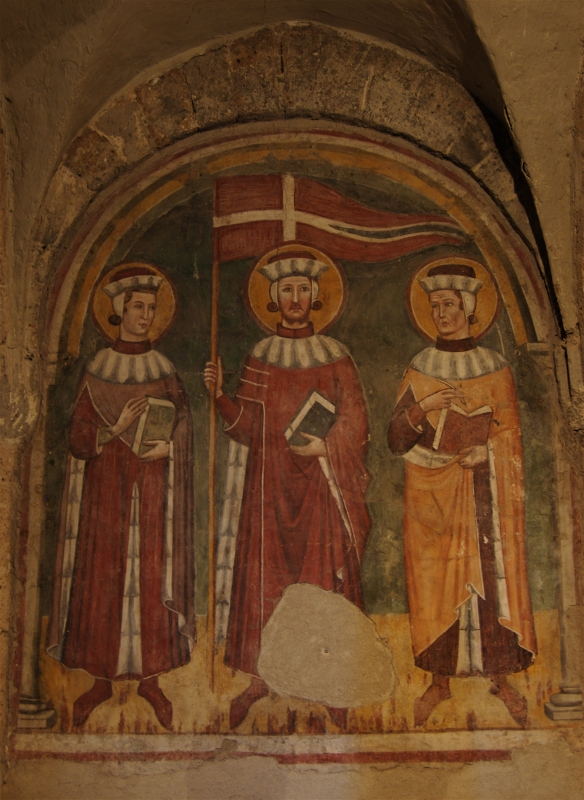
Fresco of Saints Secundian, Marcellian and Verian.

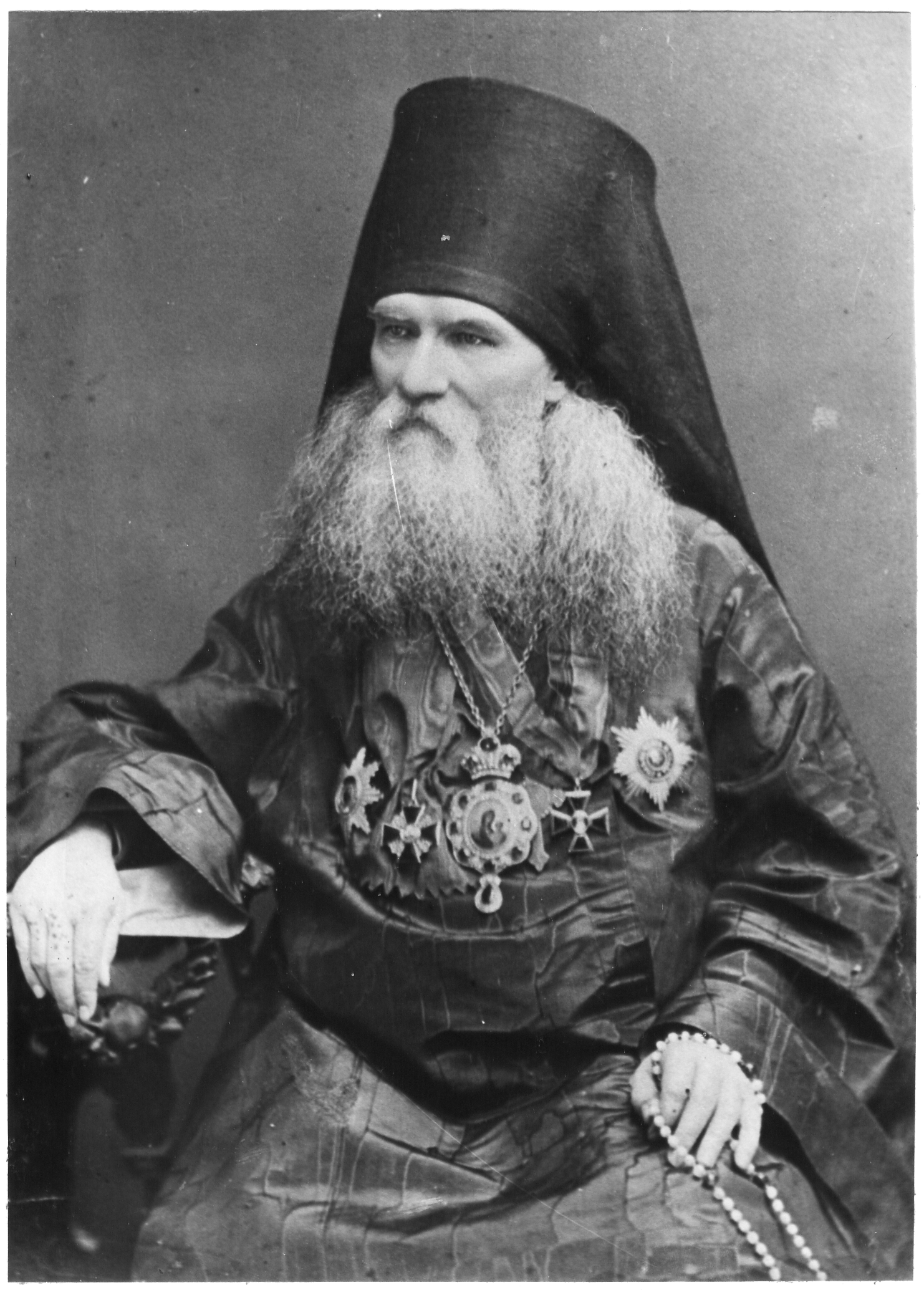
Saint Philaret (Gumilevsky).

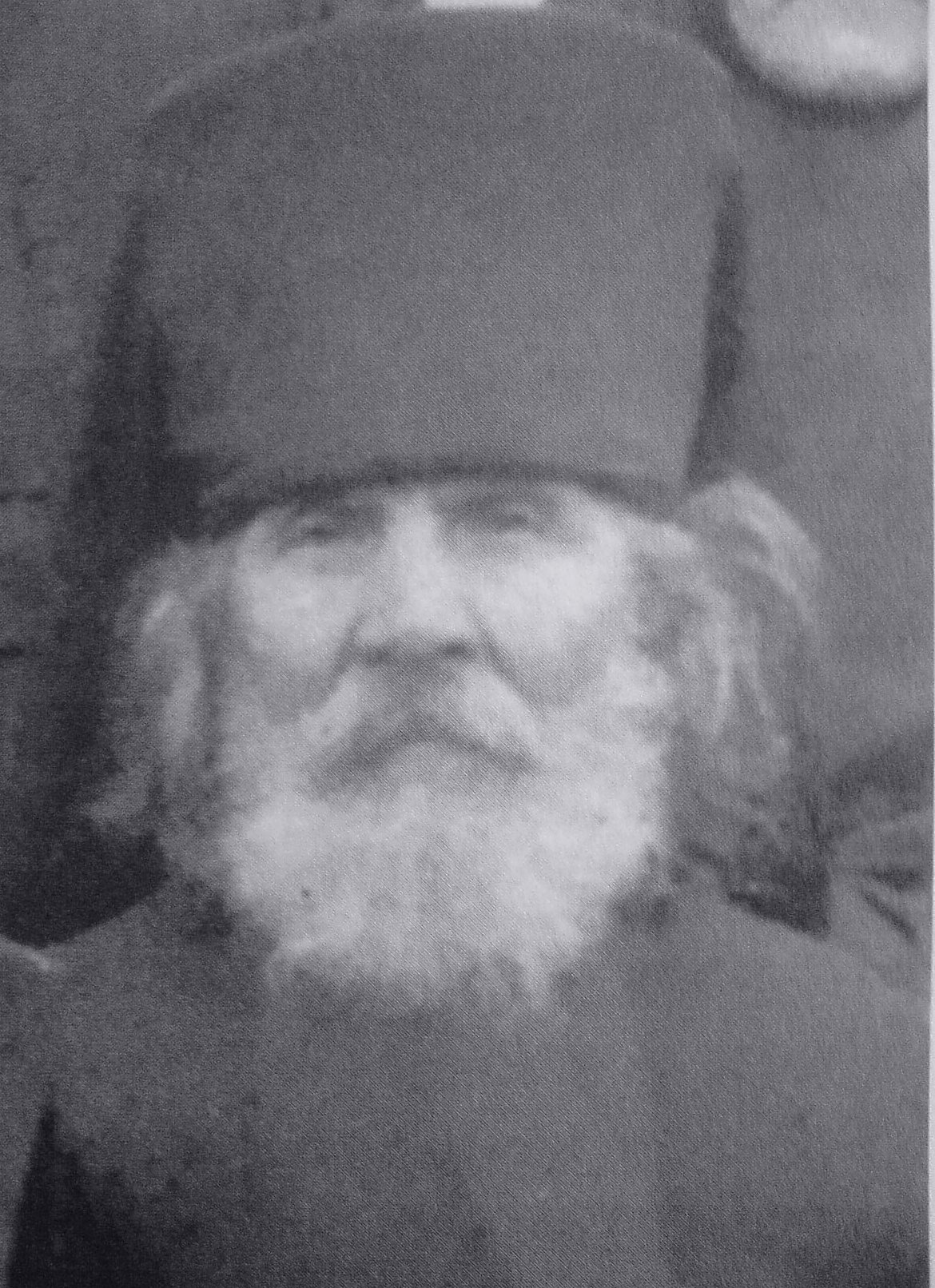
Holy New Martyr Ignatius (Bazyluk).

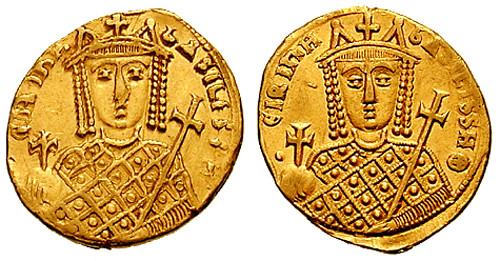
Irene of Athens, Byzantine empress regnant.

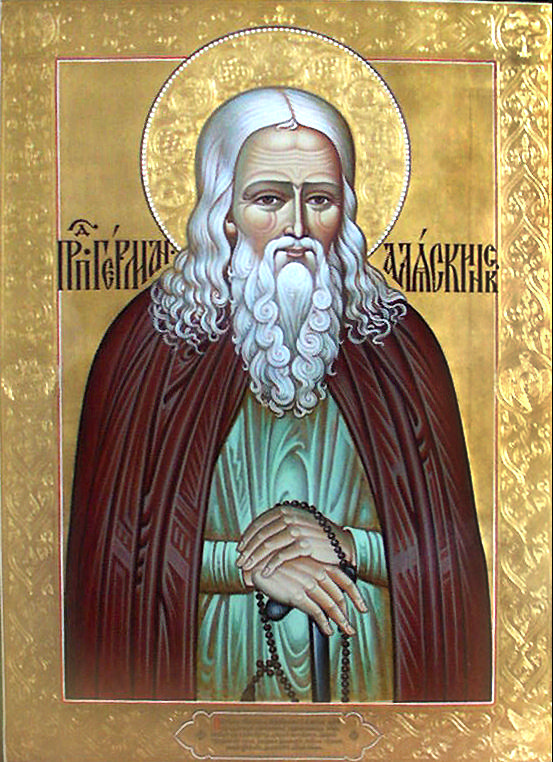
Venerable Herman of Alaska.

== Sources ==
- August 9 / August 22. Orthodox Calendar (PRAVOSLAVIE.RU).
- August 22 / August 9. HOLY TRINITY RUSSIAN ORTHODOX CHURCH (A parish of the Patriarchate of Moscow).
- August 9. OCA - The Lives of the Saints.
- The Autonomous Orthodox Metropolia of Western Europe and the Americas (ROCOR). St. Hilarion Calendar of Saints for the year of our Lord 2004. St. Hilarion Press (Austin, TX). p. 58.
- Menologion: The Ninth Day of the Month of August. Orthodoxy in China.
- August 9. Latin Saints of the Orthodox Patriarchate of Rome.
- The Roman Martyrology. Transl. by the Archbishop of Baltimore. Last Edition, According to the Copy Printed at Rome in 1914. Revised Edition, with the Imprimatur of His Eminence Cardinal Gibbons. Baltimore: John Murphy Company, 1916. pp. 237–238.
- Rev. Richard Stanton. A Menology of England and Wales, or, Brief Memorials of the Ancient British and English Saints Arranged According to the Calendar, Together with the Martyrs of the 16th and 17th Centuries. London: Burns & Oates, 1892. pp. 387–388.

Greek Sources

- Great Synaxaristes: (in Greek) 9 ΑΥΓΟΥΣΤΟΥ. ΜΕΓΑΣ ΣΥΝΑΞΑΡΙΣΤΗΣ.
- (in Greek) Συναξαριστής. 9 Αυγούστου. ECCLESIA.GR. (H ΕΚΚΛΗΣΙΑ ΤΗΣ ΕΛΛΑΔΟΣ).

Russian Sources

- (in Russian) 22 августа (9 августа). Православная Энциклопедия под редакцией Патриарха Московского и всея Руси Кирилла (электронная версия). (Orthodox Encyclopedia - Pravenc.ru).
