= Osmanna =

Saint Osmanna
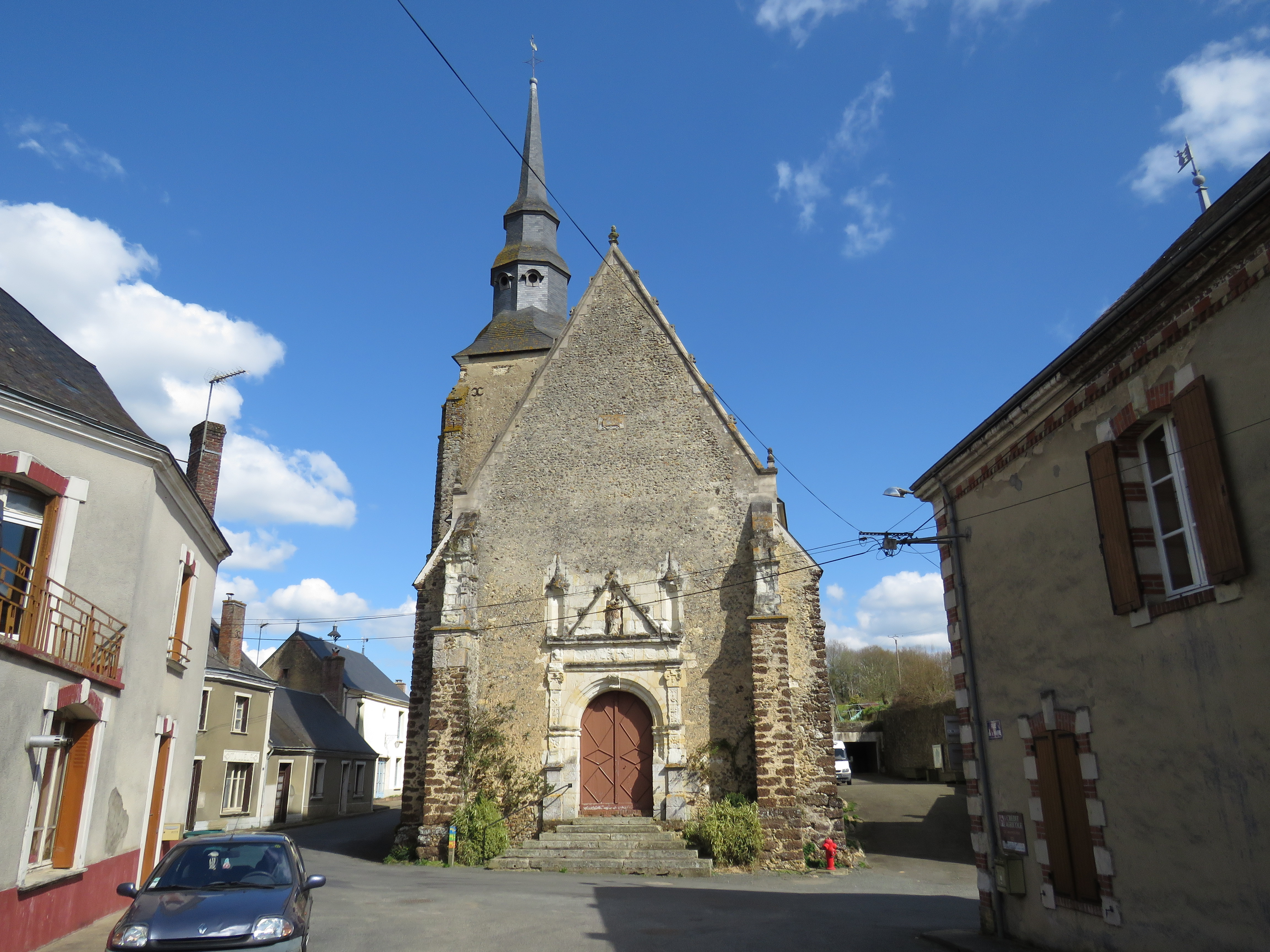
- Church of Sainte-Osmane
- Born: 6th or 7th century Ireland
- Died: 6th or 7th century France
- Feast: 9 September

Saint Osmanna (or Agariarga) was said to be a virgin of Irish royal origin who lived alone in the woods near the mouth of the Loire in France, performed many miracles of healing, and came to be considered a saint. Her story may have little basis in fact. Her feast day is 9 September.

== Life ==
Locations in France

Osmanna probably lived in the 6th or 7th century. She was said to have been from a royal family of Ireland, and was brought up as a pagan. She did not want to marry the man her parents chose for her, so left Ireland for France to live alone (apart from a maidservant) in woods near the Loire river. A wild boar that was being hunted took refuge with her, and the hunter found her. The local bishop persuaded her to learn the Christian faith, accept baptism and become a virgin dedicated to God. She continued to live alone, and cured several people by prayer.

After her death, her place of burial in Jotrum (Jouarre Abbey), near Meaux, was the scene of many miracles. A church was built over the site of her hermitage, and later an oratory was built nearby, the center of the parish of Sainte-Osmane. For many centuries the Abbey Church of Saint Denis, near Paris, held a large part of her relics. A chapel there was dedicated to the saint, and her remains were held in a richly gilt iron shrine. During the Calvinist upheavals of 1567 her relics were profaned and dispersed, and any remaining relics in the Abbey were removed in 1793 during the French Revolution. The saint is venerated in Paris, Saint-Brieuc and Le Mans. Her feast day is 9 September. Her story may be mythical.

== Butler's account ==
The hagiographer Alban Butler (1710–1773) wrote in his Lives of the Fathers, Martyrs, and Other Principal Saints,

St. OSMANNA, VIRGIN SHE was descended from an illustrious family in Ireland, and retired to France to live in a state of virginity. She fixed her residence in Lesser-Brittany, served God there in solitude with great fervour, and died near St. Brieuc, about the seventh age. For several centuries her relics were kept in a shrine in a chapel dedicated to God under her patronage in the abbatial church of St. Denys near Paris; but part of them was dispersed by the Calvinists in 1567. She is mentioned in several Martyrologies under this day. See her two lives, one by Capgrave, the other shorter and more exact, published by Suysken, Act. SS. tom. 3. Sept. 419.

== O'Hanlon's account ==
John O'Hanlon (1821-1905) thought that Osmanna's true acts were probably mixed with "obscurities, uncertainties and fables". He wrote that "...although some old Lives of her are extant, they are negligently and injudiciously composed, while they are of a character not to merit implicit belief." He then summarized her story as follows,

She was the daughter of an Irish prince, according to the Legend of her Acts, and from her very infancy, she was remarkable for her innocence, and for observing all the Divine precepts. We are told, also, that the name by which she was first known in Ireland was Agariarga, and which she bore to the time when Osmanna was given her in baptism.

Her parents were idolaters, and were opposed to her inclinations for becoming a Christian. However, she required them to answer, could she be compelled, as a believer in the one true God, to adore mute idols having no power to aid her, and to follow the pagan customs. This reluctance on her part, to continue in the old superstitions, caused them great sadness, and they devised a means, as they thought, to divert her from leading a Christian life. They wished her to marry a pagan prince, in her country, which is called Hibernia. But, to avoid their importunities, Osmana left her home and native island, accompanied only by one of her female attendants, named Aclitenis. Their destination was to Armoric Britain.

Having embarked on board a vessel, they were wafted towards the shores of Gaul, and there they disembarked on the coast near Saint-Brieuc. They sought a very solitary place, far from human habitation, and near the banks of the River Loire. In that part of the country, they constructed a sort of shieling, with the branches of trees; and in it, for a long time, they passed a life of meditation and penance. The place of their retreat was at length accidentally discovered by a hunter, who, with his dogs, followed a boar, that fled before them, and sought refuge in the but of St. Osmana. The animal lay down at her feet, and in that position was found by the hunter, who would not heed the pathetic remonstrances of the virgin. But, neither his hunting spear nor dirk was able to penetrate even the skin of the prostrate animal.

Astonished at such an adventure, the hunter returned to a city or town called Briscis or Brisis, where he related what had occurred. Whereupon, the bishop of that see, to be better informed, went with a number of his clergy and people to the holy virgin's hermitage. There they found her, covered only with the rudest kind of garment, woven from rushes and long grass into a sort of camlet, while her bed was covered with thorns on which she lay, so as to expose herself to the utmost bodily mortification. The bishop enquired if she believed in the Christian's doctrine, and desired to receive baptism. On signifying her earnestness to have that sacrament conferred on her, a vessel of water was procured, and in presence of those assembled, she was made a member of Christ's fold. At that time, also, she wrought a remarkable miracle; for a man who had been blind for three years was restored to sight, by her touching him. All present vastly rejoiced, and proclaimed Osmana a true servant of Christ and a most holy virgin. We are informed, that alter her baptism, the bishop employed a peasant to prepare a garden and lawn around Osmana's place of habitation, while another man was engaged to construct an oratory in which her devotions could be practiced.

It is related in her Acts, that she wrought many miracles, in restoring sight to the blind, hearing to the deaf, and speech to the mute. One in particular was known to have been effected, in the case of a rich man's daughter, whose name was Androchildis. A bone had accidentally stuck in her throat, which caused the loss of speech.. Hearing of St. Osmana's gift of miracles, her parents had their daughter brought to the holy virgin, who, having offered a fervent prayer to God, touched her throat, and the bone was ejected with some effusion of blood.

Although we have no record or notice to divine her period; yet, that she flourished in the sixth or seventh century seems most probable. The time or place of St Osmana's death is not recorded. According to one statement, she dwelt and was buried in a place called Jotrum, (Note: O'Hanlon says that her burial place, Jotrum, was about four miles from Meldensis or Meaux.) in the province of Bria and these facts are said to have been made known through a revelation accorded to St. Lutgarde, the holy virgin and religious of Aywieres, which lies about two leagues from Liege, in Belgium. Nor does Father Suysken think it at all improbable, that St. Osmana, who at first lived in Lesser Britain, afterwards went to Bria, and that there she died and was buried in Jotrum, where she has been so long held in special veneration. Another opinion prevails, that our saint departed this life in Armoric Britain, and that about the time of the Norman Invasion, her remains were removed to Jotrum to save them from desecration.

== Sources ==
- Butler, Alban (1866), The Lives of the Fathers, Martyrs, and Other Principal Saints, James Duffy This article incorporates text from this source, which is in the public domain.
- Farmer, David Hugh (2011-04-14), The Oxford Dictionary of Saints, Fifth Edition Revised (5 ed.), OUP Oxford, ISBN 0-19-959660-3
- O'Hanlon, John (1873), Lives of the Irish saints This article incorporates text from this source, which is in the public domain.
