= Évaillé =

- Part of Val-d'Étangson
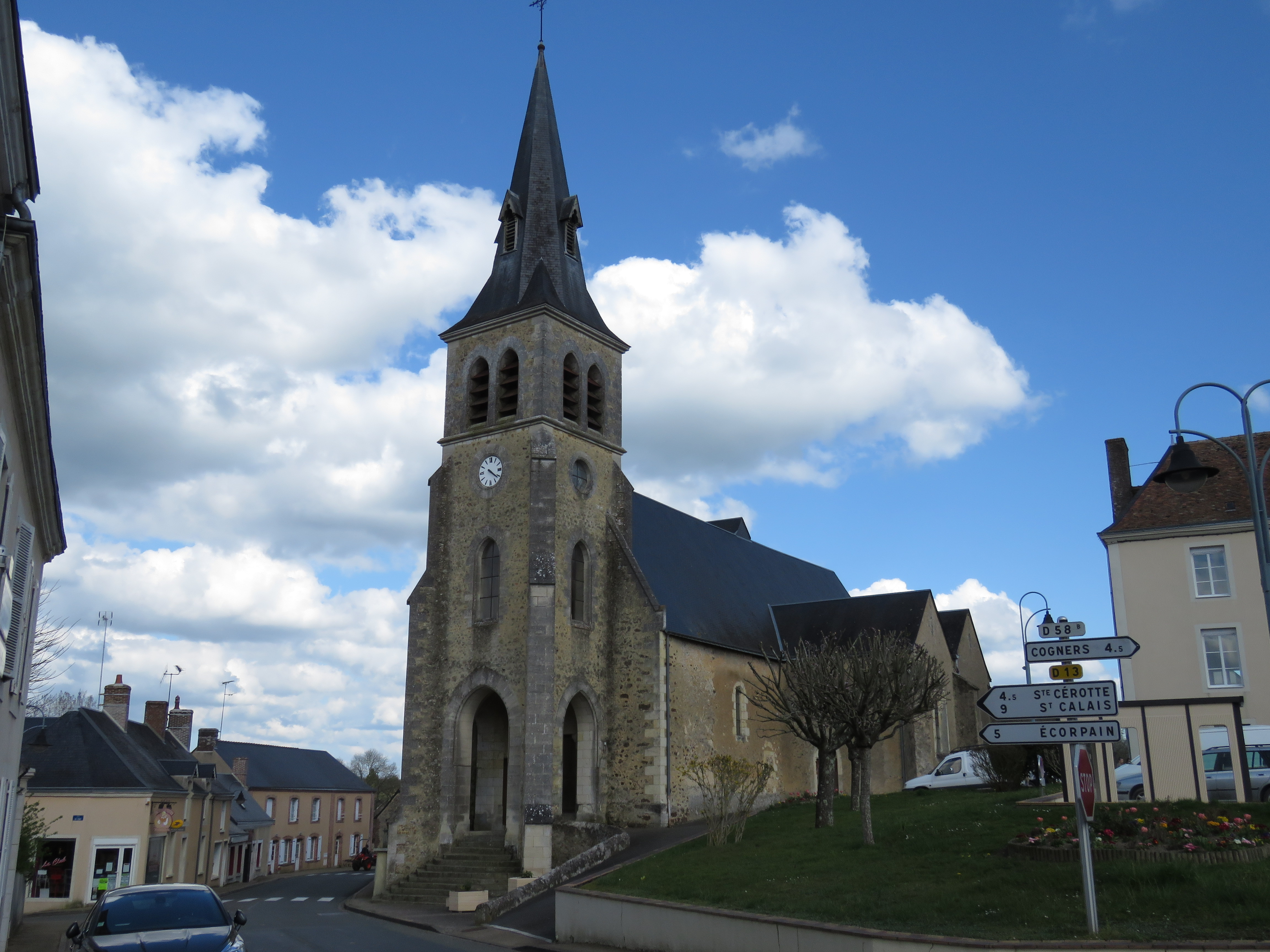
- The church of Saint Martin
- Location of Évaillé
- Location within France Location within Pays de la Loire
- Coordinates: 47°54′05″N 0°37′50″E
- Country: France
- Region: Pays de la Loire
- Department: Sarthe
- Arrondissement: Mamers
- Canton: Saint-Calais
- Commune: Val-d'Étangson
- Area^{1}: 19.43 km^{2} (7.50 sq mi)
- Highest elevation: 167 m (548 ft)
- Lowest elevation: 106 m (348 ft)
- Population (2022): 344
  - Density: 17.7/km^{2} (45.9/sq mi)
- Demonym(s): Evaillléen, Evailléenne
- Time zone: UTC+01:00 (CET)
  - Summer (DST): UTC+02:00 (CEST)
- Postal code: 72120
- ^{1} French Land Register data, which excludes lakes, ponds, glaciers > 1 km^{2} (0.386 sq mi or 247 acres) and river estuaries.

Évaillé (French pronunciation: [evaje]) is a former commune in the Sarthe department in the Pays de la Loire region in north-western France. On 1 January 2019, it was merged into the new commune Val-d'Étangson.

== See also ==
- Communes of the Sarthe department
