= Val-d'Étangson =

- Commune
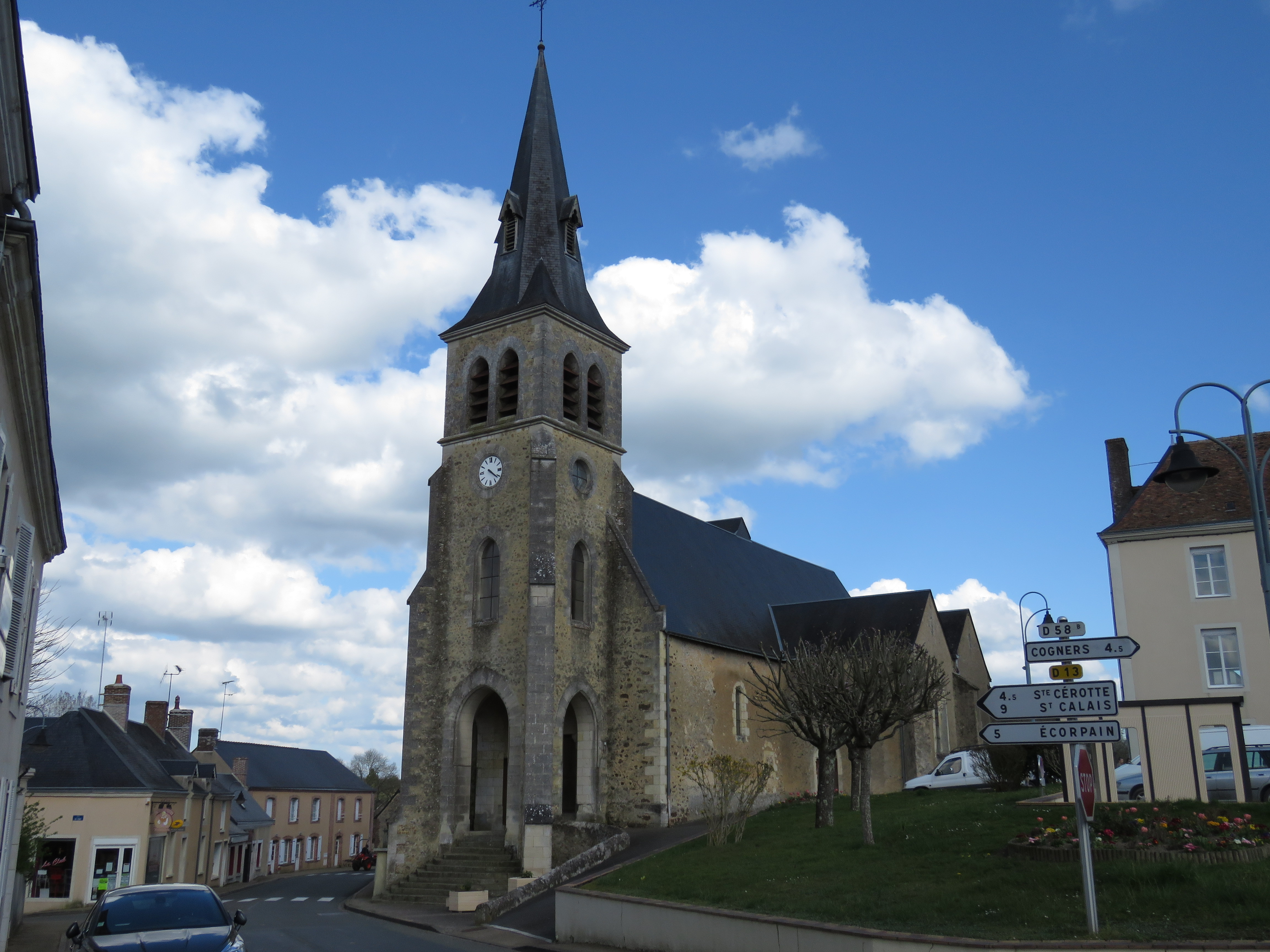
- The church of Saint Martin
- Location of Val-d'Étangson
- Location within France Location within Pays de la Loire
- Coordinates: 47°54′05″N 0°37′50″E
- Country: France
- Region: Pays de la Loire
- Department: Sarthe
- Arrondissement: Mamers
- Canton: Saint-Calais
- Intercommunality: Vallées de la Braye et de l'Anille

Government
  - Mayor (2020–2026): Patrick Grémillon
- Area^{1}: 31.31 km^{2} (12.09 sq mi)
- Highest elevation: 167 m (548 ft)
- Lowest elevation: 94 m (308 ft)
- Population (2023): 530
  - Density: 17/km^{2} (44/sq mi)
- Demonym(s): Evaillléen, Evailléenne
- Time zone: UTC+01:00 (CET)
  - Summer (DST): UTC+02:00 (CEST)
- INSEE/Postal code: 72128 /72120
- ^{1} French Land Register data, which excludes lakes, ponds, glaciers > 1 km^{2} (0.386 sq mi or 247 acres) and river estuaries.

Val-d'Étangson (French pronunciation: [val detɑ̃sɔ̃]) is a commune in the Sarthe department in the Pays de la Loire region in north-western France. It was established on 1 January 2019 by merger of the former communes of Évaillé (the seat) and Sainte-Osmane.

== See also ==
- Communes of the Sarthe department
