= Sainte-Osmane =

- Part of Val-d'Étangson
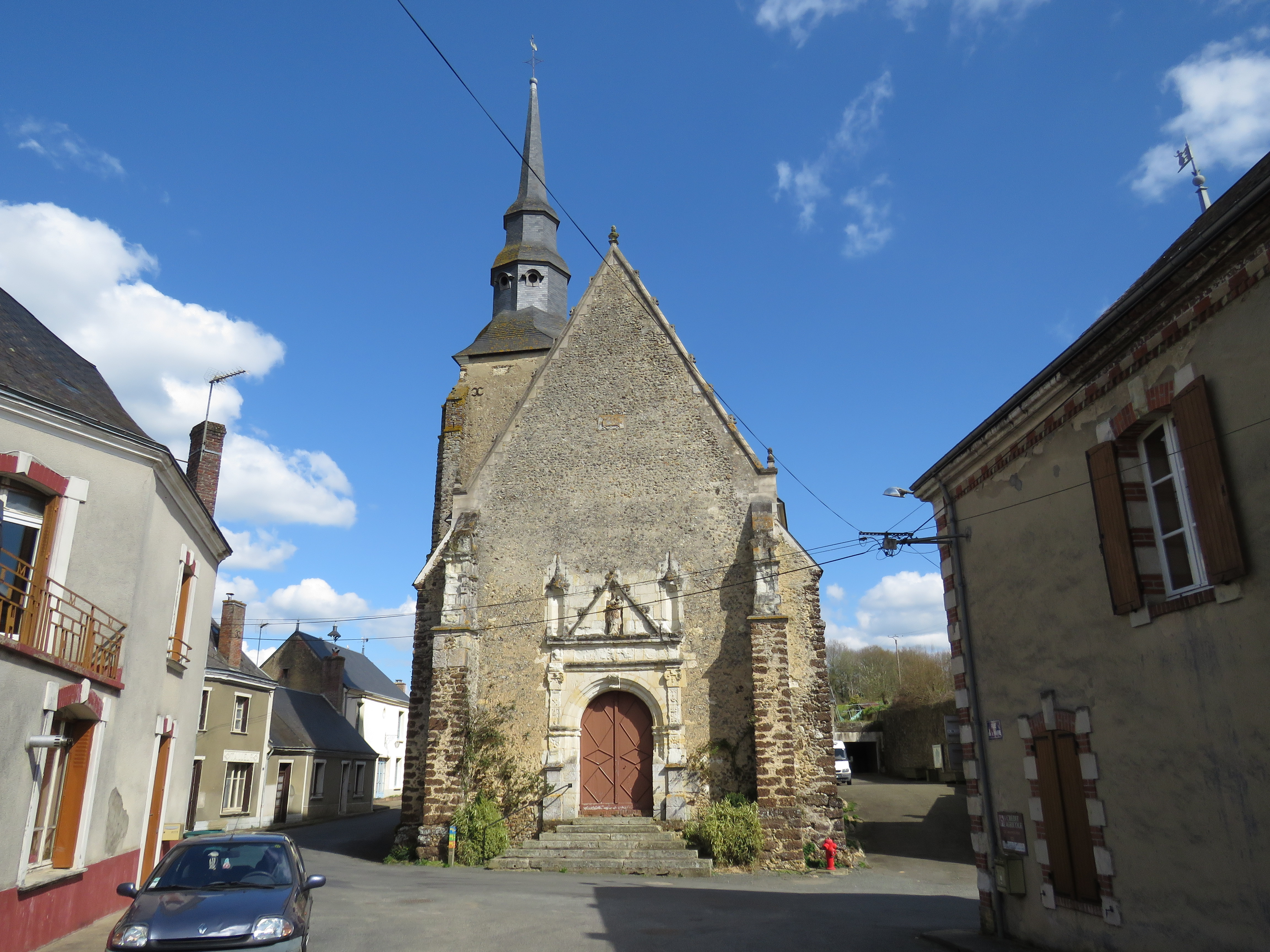
- The church of Sainte-Osmane
- Location of Sainte-Osmane
- Location within France Location within Pays de la Loire
- Coordinates: 47°53′28″N 0°36′36″E
- Country: France
- Region: Pays de la Loire
- Department: Sarthe
- Arrondissement: Mamers
- Canton: Saint-Calais
- Commune: Val-d'Étangson
- Area^{1}: 12 km^{2} (4.6 sq mi)
- Population (2022): 182
  - Density: 15/km^{2} (39/sq mi)
- Demonym(s): Osmanien, Osmanienne
- Time zone: UTC+01:00 (CET)
  - Summer (DST): UTC+02:00 (CEST)
- Postal code: 72120
- ^{1} French Land Register data, which excludes lakes, ponds, glaciers > 1 km^{2} (0.386 sq mi or 247 acres) and river estuaries.

Sainte-Osmane (French pronunciation: [sɛ̃t ɔsman]) is a former commune in the Sarthe department in the region of Pays de la Loire in north-western France. On 1 January 2019, it was merged into the new commune Val-d'Étangson. The 17th-century French Benedictine Ambroise Janvier (1613–1682) was born in the village.

The commune is named after Saint Osmanna, who hermitage was said to be there, afterwards the site of a church.

== See also ==
- Communes of the Sarthe department
