= Ambroise Janvier =

French benedictine and theologian

Ambroise Janvier (1613, Sainte-Osmane – 25 April 1682, Saint-Germain-des-Prés) was a 17th-century French Benedictine and theologian.

He joined the Congregation of Saint Maur in 1657, and made great progress in the study of the Hebrew language which he taught for many years at the Abbey of Vendôme and elsewhere.

== Publications ==
1. Élégie en vers hébraïques, sur la mort de Jérôme Bignon; 1656, printed following the Formules de Marculphe, 1666 edition.
2. Rabbi Davidis Kimhi Commentarii in Psalmos Davidis,... , Paris, Louis Billaine, 1666, in-4°, pièces liminaires, 653 p. and the table

Dom Janvier was also publisher of the Œuvres by Pierre de Celle, bishop of Chartres, Paris, 1671, in-4°, with a preface of Father Jean Mabillon.
