= Chelles Abbey =

Frankish monastery

Coordinates: 48°52′40″N 2°35′24″E

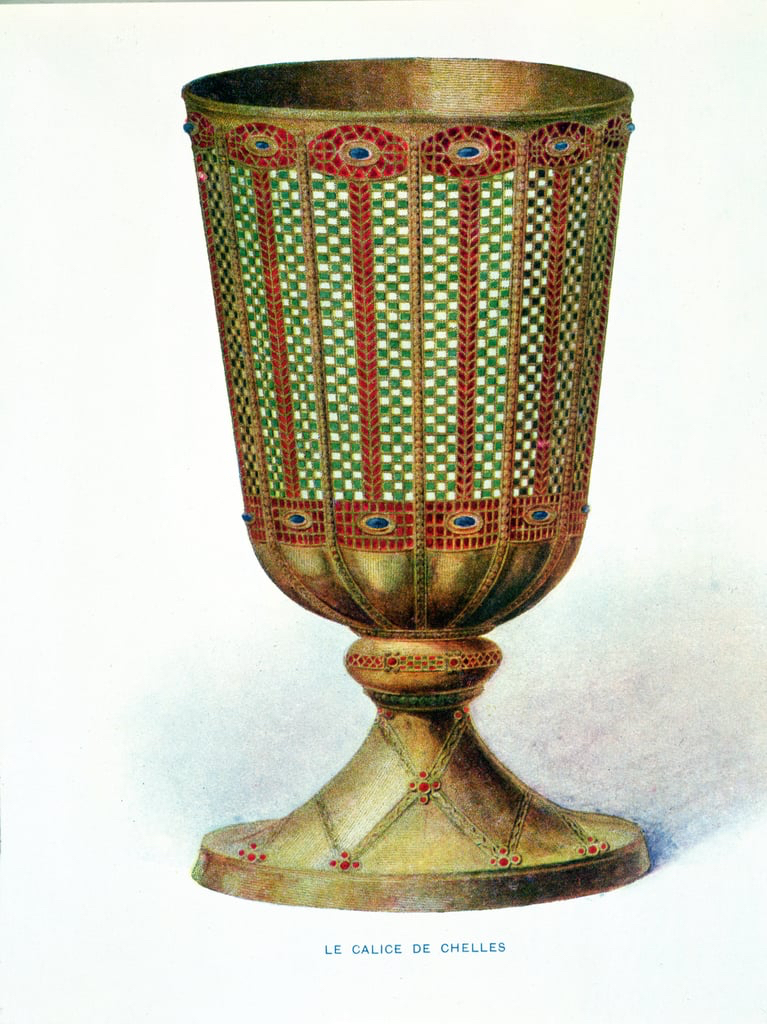
The Chelles chalice, lost at the time of the French Revolution, said to have been made by Saint Eligius

Chelles Abbey (French: Abbaye Notre-Dame-des-Chelles) was a Frankish monastery founded around 657/660 during the early medieval period. It was intended initially as a monastery for women; then its reputation for great learning grew, and when men wanted to follow the monastic life, a parallel male community was established, creating a double monastery.

The abbey stood in Chelles near Paris (Seine-et-Marne department) until the disestablishment of the Catholic Church in 1792 during the French Revolution, and was destroyed. The abbey housed an important scriptorium and held the advantage of powerful royal connections throughout the Carolingian era.

== History ==
Before its religious designation, the site of the abbey, Cala (Gaulish "a collection of pebbles"; modern Chelles, Seine-et-Marne) had held a royal Merovingian villa. Queen Clotilde, the wife of Clovis I, had previous built a small chapel there dedicated to Saint George circa 511.

King Chilperic I and his wife, Fredegund, frequently resided at Cala; Chilperic was assassinated in 584 while hunting there.

The Queen-Saint Balthild, wife of King Clovis II (639-657/658), an Anglo-Saxon aristocrat who had been taken to Gaul as a slave, founded the abbey around 657/660 on the ruins of the Clothilde's chapel as a monastery for women. She gave the first of two great endowments to its construction, enabling the abbey and a large new Church of the Holy Cross to be built. Though no charters survive, in "Life of Saint Balthild", there are references to the gifts she made to the abbey.

Balthild and the abbesses quickly established an impressive reputation for encouraging learning, which attracted monks to Chelles and resulted in its conversion to a double monastery by the end of the 7th century. Balthild herself retired to Chelles in 664, bringing with her a second endowment, and died there in 680, where she was also buried. Her possessions were treated as relics at Chelles, including a chasuble, a vestment embroidered with a pectoral cross and an image of a beautiful necklace, which is currently displayed in the museum at the site. Her hagiography was written soon after her death, probably by a nun at the abbey.

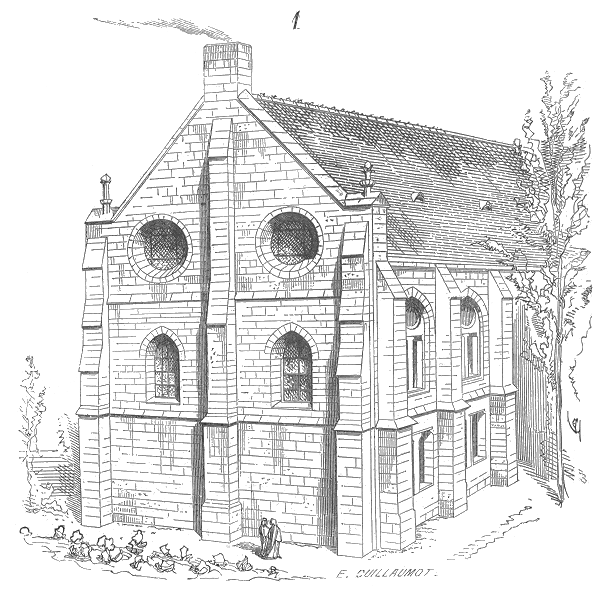
Eugène Viollet-le-Duc's reconstruction of the 13th-century dormitory at Chelles

Balthild is reported to have established the monastery first under the Rule of Saint Columbanus, then later adopted the Rule of Saint Benedict, although recent scholars, including Moyse and Dierkens, have warned against assumptions that the Rule was a firmly entrenched system. According to the New Catholic Encyclopedia, the abbey represented a step in the progress of Celtic Christianity into Burgundy, especially in its admittance of monks.

In any case, Balthild exerted control by appointing her own choice of abbess, Bertila. After the apparent shift to the Benedictine Rule from that of Columbanus, the abbey was often governed by Carolingian princesses who continued this tradition.

=== Holy women and royalty ===
Chelles was founded during a century in which an unprecedented number of women were entering monasteries. There was a dramatic increase in the number of such institutions providing for these women, particularly in France, Britain and the Low Countries. According to Paul Fouracre, the rate of monastery building is the best-recorded indicator that Christian culture was successfully flowing through the countryside from urban centers as members of the Frankish elite founded monasteries on their lands, greatly influencing their tenants, and occupied leading posts within the Catholic Church.

Royal assent remained crucial to ecclesiastical appointments, which meant that the Merovingian monarchs themselves were usually important patrons of the monasteries. Their support of the religious communities was a means of sanctifying and legitimating their royal power. Chelles’ success as an institution of learning and renown was possibly due to its strong royal and aristocratic connections from its inception: from its construction at the behest of Balthild, the appointment of a daughter of the French nobility, Berthild of Chelles, as its first abbess and the powerful influence of Charlemagne’s sister, Gisela, Abbess of Chelles, who led the monastery from 800-810. Yitzhak Hen supports this, suggesting that the links to royalty encouraged local inhabitants to attend Sunday Mass regularly, if only to catch a glimpse of the king, queen or their representatives. The abbey was effective in utilising the rituals of communion and confession to establish itself as a powerful agent of conversion in the countryside to the extent that it has been described by historians as a ‘training ground for missionaries of monasticism’, and by extension, Christianity itself.

Bertila’s reputation as a pious member of the nobility and, later, the eminence of Gisela, sister of Charlemagne, drew several foreign princesses to join the nuns at Chelles, including Hereswith of Northumbria. The abbey swiftly became one of the most favored monasteries for English royal princesses in Francia to be sent to for their religious instruction, along with other convents in the Paris basin such as at Les Andelys (built in 511 AD, the first convent in France) and Fécamp Abbey (built by Dux Waningus in 658). Its international reputation was further secured by Bertila’s gifts of relics, books and tutors to help establish monasteries of nuns in Britain, and accepting several young English women into the monastic community.

During her abbacy, Gisela worked to broaden the scope of Chelles and effectively shaped the monastery into a political hub where monarchs and aristocrats came to worship. Janet L. Nelson called it the "centre of the monarchic cult", indicating a unique prominence for the abbey and firm royal connections. Political contacts met there and information was collected from across the kingdom. Abbess Gisela was the one person to send Alcuin the news at Tours of her brother Charlemagne’s official coronation. Nelson suggests that the abbess, as well as writing to Alcuin in Latin to request a Biblical commentary, was responsible for writing the Annales Mettenses priores, which recorded a visit from the Holy Roman Emperor Charlemagne himself in 804.

=== The nuns' scriptorium ===
By the 9th century, the nuns of Chelles were renowned as skilled copyists and authors of manuscripts. Many memoria of monarchs and their family members are emerging from their scriptorium, along with the Lives of several saints. Gisèla was particularly famous for her intelligence and learning, and for demanding several books and biblical commentaries for the monastery’s library. The nuns owned, or at least had access to, the Annales regni Francorum and Continuationes Fredegarii, which were and both remain significant sources for history-writing.

The monastery housed an important scriptorium, involving a consortium of at least nine nuns as scribes. The manuscripts that survive are not illuminated, yet Chelles Abbey is particularly strongly linked with the creation of a unique script style. Jane Stevenson believes there were around fourteen nuns in an ‘atelier’, working under a nun master-scribe, and describes Chelles as one of the most productive scriptoria of the eighth and ninth centuries and therefore a significant nucleus of intellectual activity. The seminal work attributing these nuns to the scriptorium at Chelles is written by Bernhard Bischoff. He compared certain texts to other books written in the same minuscule and located them at Chelles between c.785 and 810, at the time when Gisèla was abbess. The nuns’ surviving texts include parts of the Cologne manuscripts of Augustine’s Commentary on the Psalms (Dombibliothek 63, 65 and 67), Eusebius’ Ecclesiastical History, a fragment of Isidore of Seville’s Etymologiae and various other works by the bishop, as well as a copy of the Dialogues of Gregory the Great and a fragment of his Homilia in evangelium. Many of the manuscripts are signed by women, such as Girbalda, Gislidis, Agleberta, Adruhic, Altildis, Eusebia and Vera, all in a similar script. This indicates the existence of a collective, working at Chelles’ scriptorium. Rosamond McKitterick has suggested that the manuscripts’ high quality indicates that the scribes at Chelles were talented and understood the texts they were copying. The fact that so many of these texts were authoritative works of the Catholic Church, written by early theologians, also lends McKitterick to suggest that the scribes were well-educated.

=== Later history ===
For many years almost all the abbesses were the widows, daughters or sisters of emperors and kings, which over time affected monastic discipline adversely. Stephen of Senlis and Louis de Beaumont de la Forêt, Bishops of Paris, tried in vain to reform the abbey in 1134 and 1483, respectively. Not until 1499, under Bishop Jean-Simon de Champigny, was any success achieved in this regard, through a decree of the Parlement of Paris: from 1500 the abbesses were elected every three years, which included the possibility of re-election. However, as early as 1559 the king abolished the election and resumed the appointment of the abbesses himself.

In 1790, during the French Revolution, the abbey was dissolved. In 1796 the abbey complex was sold as a national asset and destroyed. The remains of the abbey are today incorporated in the Hôtel de Ville (town hall) of modern Chelles.

== Abbesses ==
- Saint Berthild
- Sigissa or Sigisla (documented 708)
- Vilcome
- Ermengarde
- Clemencia
- Ascelina I
- Sybilla
- Marsilia (to 800)
- Gisela (800-810), d. 810, sister of Charlemagne
- Hedwig, Duchess of Bavaria, d. after 835, mother of the Empress Judith
- Ermentrude (855-869), d. 869, first wife of Charles the Bald
- Rothild, documented 912 and 922, d. 928/929, daughter of Charles the Bald (by his second marriage)

The attempt of Charles the Simple in 922 to dispossess his aunt, Rothild of Chelles, in order to give it to his favourite, Hagano, led to his deposition after a revolt of the nobility, probably under the leadership of Hugh the Great, Rothild's son-in-law.

For about 170 years no abbesses are documented.

- Matilda I (1097-1112)
- Amelina I (or Avelina) (documented 1127/37)
- Maud or Matilda II (documented 1156)
- Helvide II or Héloise (1155-1177)
- Ascelina II, d. 1178
- Marie I de Duny (1178-1185)
- Amelina II, d. 1205
- Marie II de Néry, d. 1208
- Mathilde III de Berchère (1208-1220), d. 1220
- Mathilde IV de Corbeil (probably 1220-1223)
- Florence (abbess 1223), d. 1228
- Marguerite I de Néry (1228-1231)
- Pétronille I de Mareuil (1231-1250), d. 1250
- Mathilde V de Nanteuil (1250-1274), d. 1274
- vacancy (1274-1280)
- Adeline I de Nanteuil (1280-1311), d. 1311
- Alice I de Clignet d'Otis (1311-1317), d. 1317
- Marguerite II de Pacy (1317-1348)
- Pétronille II de Paroy (1348-1354)
- Adeline II de Pacy (1354-1363), d. 1363
- Jeanne I de Soissy (1363-1364), d. 1364
- Agnès I de La Queue (1364-1368), d. after 1368
- Jeanne II de La Forest (1368-1379), d. 1379
- Jeanne III de Roye (1379-1399), d. 1399, sister of Guy de Roye, Archbishop of Reims
- Agnès II de Neufville (1399-1414)
- Alice II de Thorote (1414-1419)
- Marie II de Cléry (1420-1429)
- Elisabeth de Pollye (1429-1475), d. 1475
- Catherine I de Lignières (1475-1500), d. 1504

=== Abbesses elected for three years ===
- Jeanne IV de La Rivière (1500-1507)
- Marie III de Reilhac (1507-1510), d. 1547
- Marie IV Cornu (1510-1514), d. 1519
- Catherine II Marguerite de Champrond (1518-1518), d. 1518
- Barbe de Tallensac (1518-1528), d. 1537
- Madeleine I des Chelles (1528-1542), d. 1542
- Jacqueline d'Amignon (1542-1558), d. 1558

=== Abbesses nominated by the King ===
- Renée de Bourbon (1559-1583), d. 1583, daughter of Charles, Duke of Vendôme
- Marie V de Lorraine (1583-1627), d. 1627, daughter of Claude, Duke of Aumale
- Marie-Henriette de Bourbon (1627-1629), d. 1629, illegitimate daughter of Henri IV
- Madeleine II de la Porte de la Meilleraye (1629-1671), d. 1671
- Guidone Marguerite de Cossé (1671-1680) (1st time), daughter of François de Cossé, duc de Brissac
- Catherine III de Scorailles de Roussille (1680-1688)
- Guidone Marguerite de Cossé (1688-1707) (2nd time), d. 1707
- Charlotte Agnès de Villars (1707-1719), d. 1723
- Louise Adélaïde d'Orléans (1719-1734), daughter of Philippe II, Duke of Orléans
- Anne de Clermont-Chaste de Gessans (1735-1790)

== Other royal nuns ==
- The Northumbrian princess Hereswith, sister of Hilda of Whitby;
- Swanachild, discarded wife of Charles Martel;
- Rotrude, daughter of Charlemagne.

Mildthryth may have been educated at Chelles Abbey.

== Chalice ==
Until the French Revolution, when it disappeared, Chelles Abbey possessed a renowned Merovingian gold chalice, enameled and mounted with precious stones, that was said to have been wrought by Saint Eligius and a very large number of relics.

== See also ==
- List of Carolingian monasteries
- Carolingian architecture

== Notes ==
=== References ===
- Bischoff, Bernhard (1966). Die Kölner Nonnenhandschriften und das Skriptorium von Chelles. In: Mittelalterliche Studien. Ausgewählte Aufsätze zur Schriftkunde und Literaturgeschichte, vol. I. Stuttgart. pp. 16–34.
- Delamarre, Xavier (2012). Noms de lieux celtiques de l'Europe ancienne : -500 - +500 : dictionnaire : Mediola-non... Vindoialon... Condate... Carantiacon... Lugudunon... Noviomagos. Paris: Errance. ISBN 978-2-87772-483-8.
- Effros, Bonnie (2010). Caring for Body and Soul: Burial and the Afterlife in the Merovingian World. University Park, PA: Penn State University Press. ISBN 9780271027852.
- Geary, Patrick J., ed. (2010). Readings in medieval history (4th ed.). Toronto: University of Toronto Press. ISBN 9781442601208.
- Fouracre, Paul; Gerberding, Richard A. (1996). Late Merovingian France: History and Hagiography, 640–720. Manchester: Manchester University Press. ISBN 9780719047916.
- Fouracre, Paul (2005). "Francia in the seventh century". In Paul Fouracre (ed.). The New Cambridge Medieval History Volume 1: c.500–c.700. Cambridge University Press. pp. 371–396. ISBN 978-0-521-36291-7.
- Hen, Yitzhak (1995). Culture and religion in Merovingian Gaul A.D. 481–751. Leiden: Brill. ISBN 9789004103474.
- Lerner, Gerda (1994). The Creation of Feminist Consciousness: from the Middle Ages to Eighteen-seventy. New York: Oxford University Press. ISBN 9780195090604.
- McKitterick, Rosamond (1992). "Nuns' Scriptoria in England and Francia in the Eighth Century". Francia. 19 (1): 1–35. Archived from the original on 2010-10-04.
- Nelson, Janet L. (1996). The Frankish world: 750–900. London: Hambledon. ISBN 1852851058.
