= Agilberta =

Benedictine French saint (died 680)

Saint Agilberta
- Died: 680; France
- Venerated in: Roman Catholic Church; Antiochian Orthodox Church
- Canonized: Pre-congregation
- Feast: August 10
- Tradition or genre: Benedictine

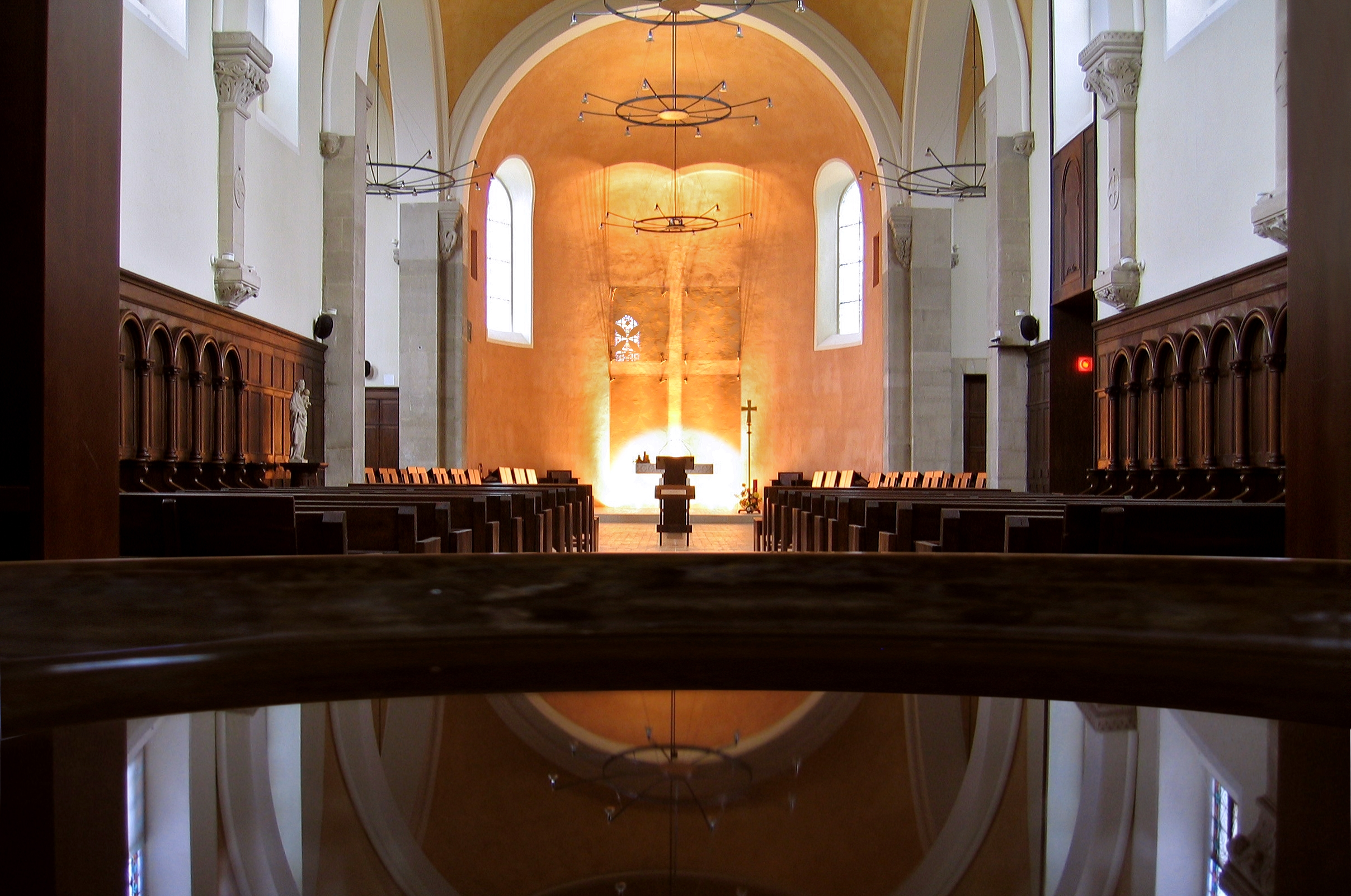
Jouarre Abbey church

Agilberta (d. 680), also known as Aguilberta of Jouarre and Gilberta of Jouarre, is a Benedictine French saint, venerated in both the Roman Catholic Church and Antiochian Orthodox Church. She was a nun and the second abbess of the Jouarre Abbey, in the département of Seine-et-Marne. Agilberta was a relative of Ebrigisil and Ado, who founded Jouarre in 660. Her brother, Agilbert, was bishop of Paris. Agilberta's sister, Balda, was Jouarre's third abbess.

Agilberta's feast day is August 10th. She died in 680. She is buried in the crypt at Jouarre in one of three well-preserved sarcophagi. It is of particular interest to scholars because of its stonework following the Roman burial tradition.
