= Jouarre Abbey =

Abbey in Seine-et-Marne, France

Coordinates: 48°55′36″N 3°7′55″E

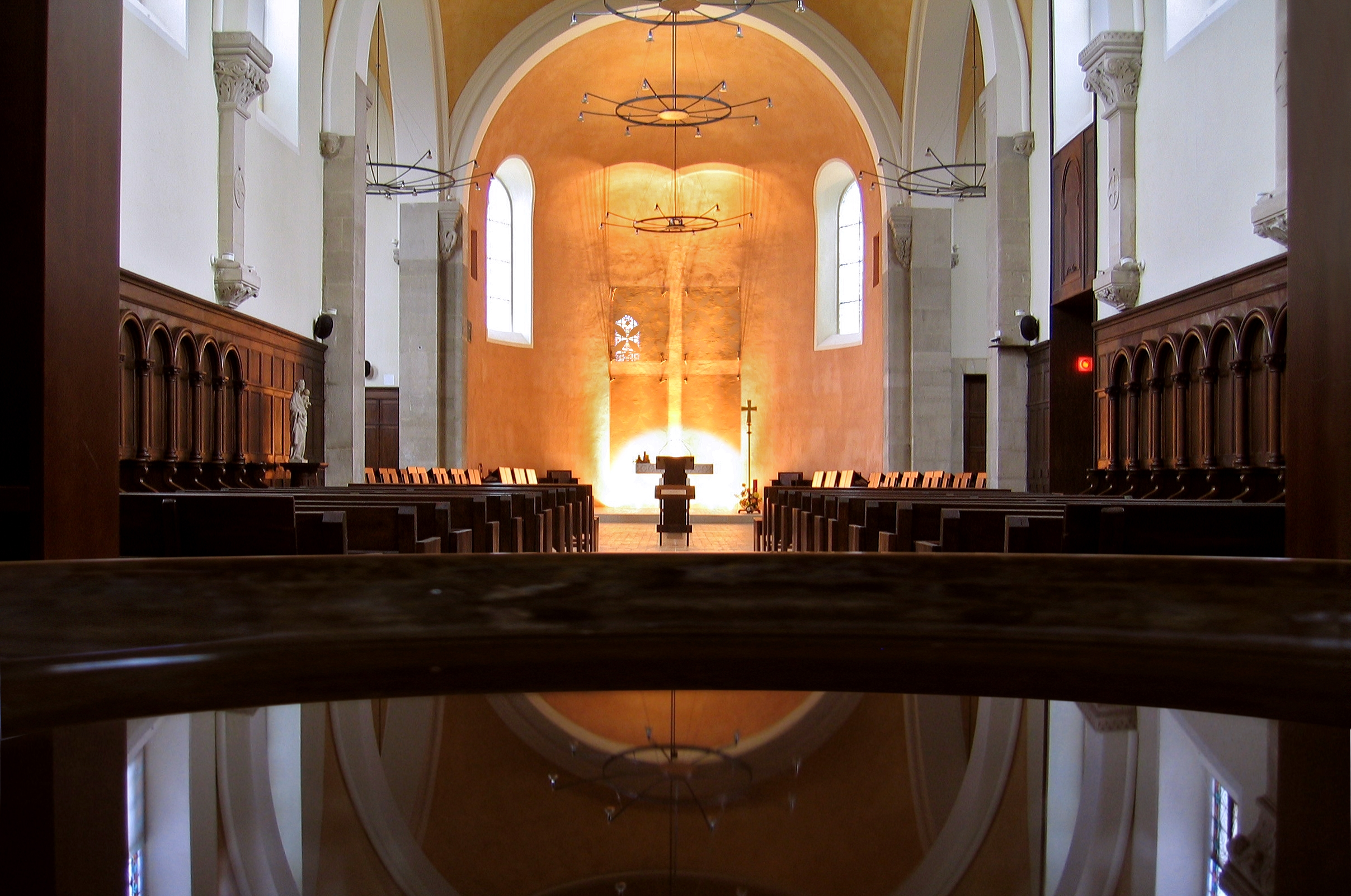
Jouarre Abbey church

Jouarre Abbey (Abbaye Notre-Dame de Jouarre) is a Benedictine abbey in Jouarre in the département of Seine-et-Marne.

== History ==
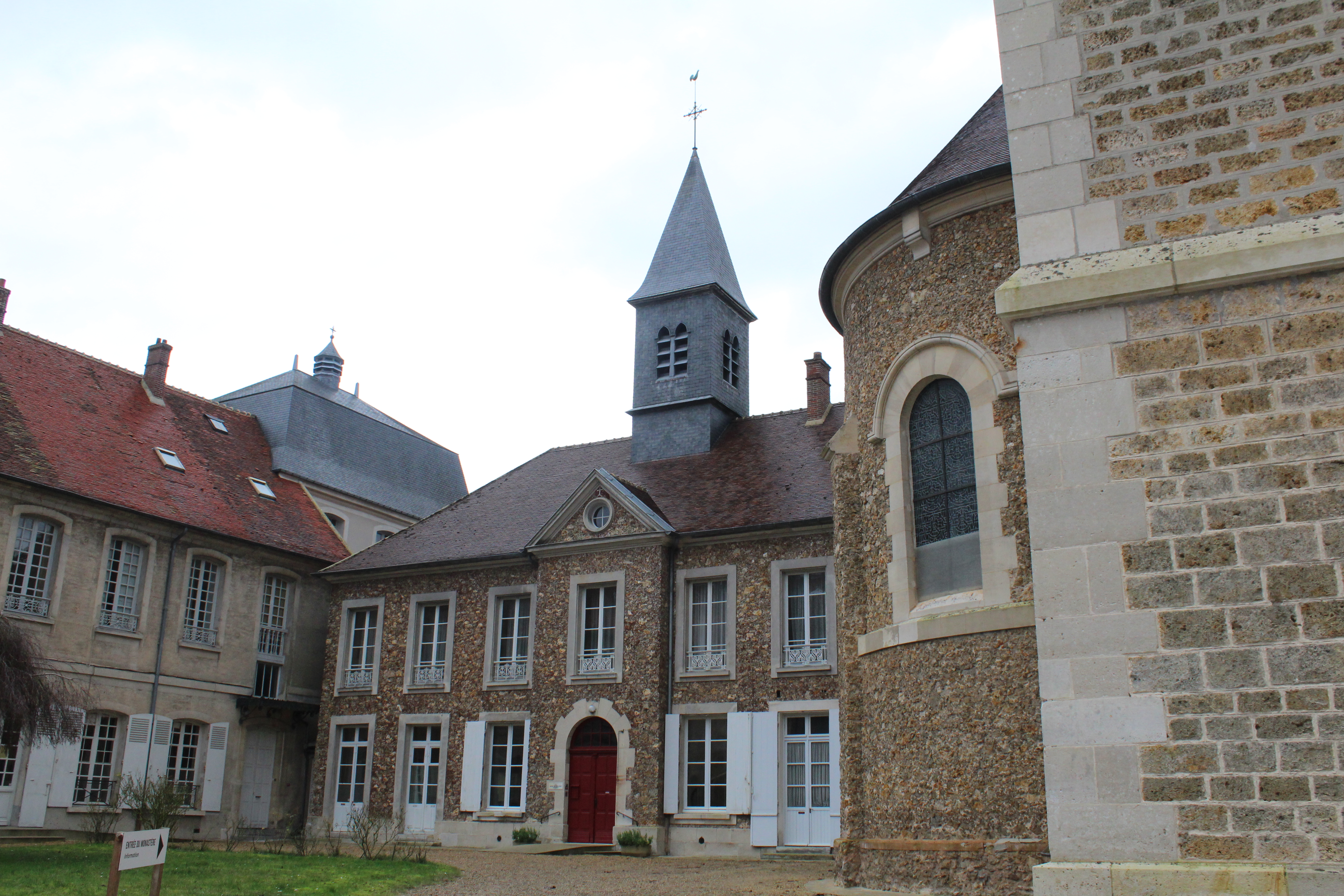
Abbaye Notre-Dame Jouarre

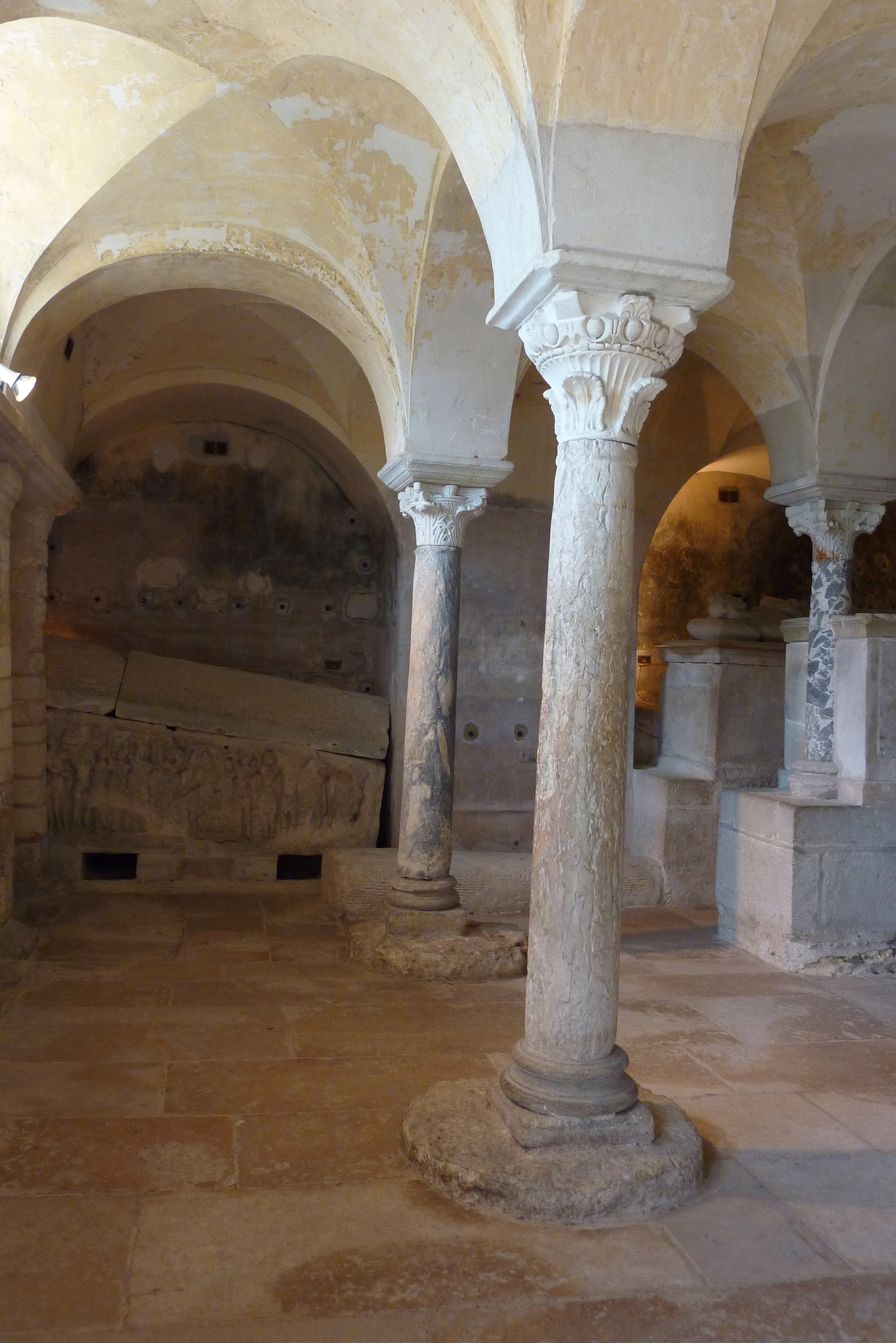
Crypt and sarcophagi

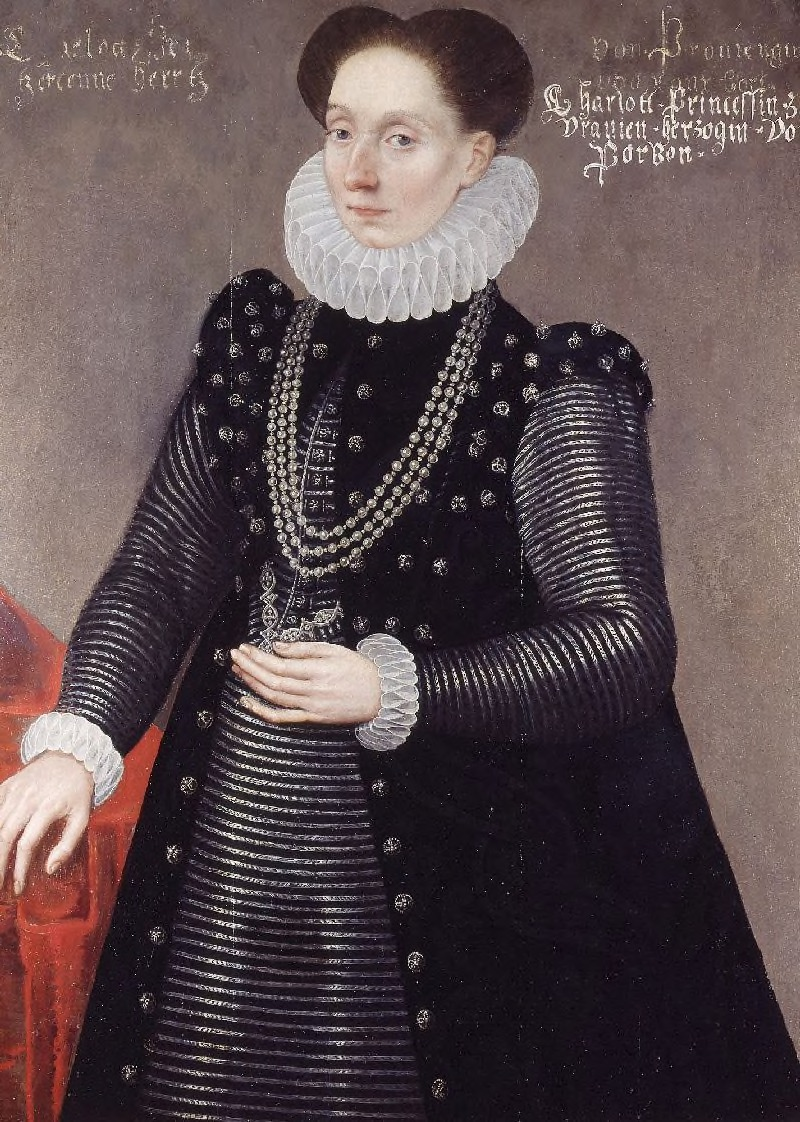
Charlotte of Bourbon

This Merovingian foundation was established around 630, by Adon, son of Saint Authaire (Audecharius), inspired by a visit of St. Columbanus. His first cousin, Thelchildes, who had been educated at the abbey of Faremoutiers, became Abbess. As part of its Celtic heritage, Jouarre was established as a "double community," i.e., a community of monks as well as nuns, both under the rule of the abbess, following a mixed rule. Charlemagne later imposed the Rule of Saint Benedict.

The Merovingian (pre-Romanesque) crypt beneath the Romanesque abbey church contains a number of burials in sarcophagi, notably that of Theodochilde's brother, Agilbert (died 680), carved with a tableau of the Last Judgment and Christ in Majesty, highlights of pre-Romanesque sculpture. In the mid-ninth century the abbey acquired relics of St. Potentian; the relics assembled at Jouarre attracted pilgrims. The body of Saint Osmanna was buried in the abbey before being transferred to the Abbey Church of Saint Denis.

The abbey suffered from attacks by Vikings and was rebuilt in the tenth century. The Carolingian tower was attached to the church and served as a watch tower. The reputation of the house stood so high the abbey received a visit from Pope Innocent II in 1131 and was able to house a synod in 1133. In 1225 the abbey was granted immunity from interference from the bishop of Meaux, answering only to the pope. During the Hundred Years' War, the abbey was ransacked and the nuns forced into exile; but they returned in 1433.

The abbey is an important pilgrimage center. A fortified town was built around it and gave birth to the present city of Jouarre. At the time of the St. Bartholomew's Day massacre (1572), the abbess Charlotte of Bourbon (1547–1582) converted to Protestantism and escaped from the abbey in a cart of hay, and fled to Germany. She married William I of Orange-Nassau.

The abbess's submission to the bishop of Meaux did not come about until Bossuet held the post in 1690.

In 1797 the buildinga were confiscated by the Revolution and Benedictine community was dispersed. The cloister and the chapter were destroyed; the church served as a stone quarry. In 1821, the nuns bought back the Abbot's House and opened a boarding school. The church was rebuilt in 1863. The present monastery buildings, once again occupied by Benedictine nuns, date from the eighteenth century; their traditional vegetable and fruit garden (potager) are notable.

== The abbesses ==
(incomplete list)

- Telchilde (630-680)
- St. Agilberta, second Abbess of Jouarre
- St. Balda
- Hersende
- Jeanne de Montpensier (1541 † 1620), daughter of Louis III of Montpensier
- Charlotte of Bourbon, daughter of Louis III of Montpensier
- Jeanne de Guise (1586 † 1638), daughter of Henry, Duke of Guise
- Henriette de Lorraine (1631–1693), daughter of Claude de Lorraine, Duke of Chevreuse
- Anne-Therese de Rohan (1684–1738) daughter of Charles de Rohan, prince de Soubise

== Burials ==
- Saint Agilbert
- Theodechildis (Agilbert's sister), who was abbess

== Foundations ==
- Abbey of Regina Laudis (Connecticut)
